= Timeline of the war on terror =

The war on terror is the campaign launched by the United States of America in response to the September 11 attacks against organizations designated with terrorism. The campaign, whose stated objective was eliminating international terrorism, began in 2001.

Conflict primarily by region
North America	Europe	Other
Southeast Asia	West Asia	South Asia
North Africa	West Africa	East Africa
Political	Multiple locations	

== 2001 ==
Dates	Events
September 11	The September 11 attacks in New York City, Washington D.C., and Shanksville, Pennsylvania, United States, killed 2,996 people.
September 12	The United Nations Security Council unanimously adopted Resolution 1368: condemning the September 11 attacks, calling on all countries to co-operate in bringing the perpetrators, organizers and sponsors of the attacks to justice and that those responsible for supporting or harboring the perpetrators, organizers and sponsors would be held accountable.
September 14	Operation Noble Eagle begins, the United States and Canadian military launch operations related to homeland security in response to the September 11 attacks.
September 14	The Authorization for Use of Military Force Against Terrorists was passed as S.J.Res. 23 by the United States Congress, authorizing the use of United States Armed Forces against those responsible for the attacks on September 11, 2001, and any "associated forces". The authorization granted the President the authority to use all "necessary and appropriate force" against those whom he determined "planned, authorized, committed or aided" the September 11th attacks, or who harbored said persons or groups.
September 18 and October 9	2001 anthrax attacks kill 5 and infect 17 others by anthrax spores in New York City, New York, Boca Raton, Florida, and Washington D.C. in the United States.
September 20	Bush speech to Congress: the phrase "war on terror" was first officially used.
October 1	Jaish-e-Mohammed (JeM) terrorists carried out the Jammu and Kashmir legislative assembly car bombing in the city of Srinagar in Jammu and Kashmir, India, killing 38 and injuring 60.
October 7	The War in Afghanistan begins. with the Invasion of Afghanistan, under the codename Operation Enduring Freedom – Afghanistan (OEF-A).
October 9	Operation Eagle Assist begins, 13 NATO nations execute operational sorties over the skies of the United States in NATO AWACS aircraft.
October 16	Operation Active Endeavour officially begins.
October 23	United States Department of Justice produced the 37-page classified memorandum entitled "Authority for Use of Military Force to Combat Terrorist Activities Within the United States"
October 26	Congress pass the Patriot Act: which allows the search and electronic surveillance powers of federal agencies while investigating persons suspected of terrorism.
November 9–10	The Fall of Mazar-i-Sharif takes place: U.S. and Northern Alliance forces capture the city of Mazar-i-Sharif, in Balkh Province in Afghanistan, from Taliban, al-Qaeda, Islamic Movement of Uzbekistan (IMU), Tehreek-e-Nafaz-e-Shariat-e-Mohammadi (TNSM), and other foreign fighters, the Northern Alliance suffered 38 killed whilst the terrorists suffered over 300 killed, 500 captured and 1,000 defected.
November 11–23	The Siege of Kunduz takes place: U.S. and Northern Alliance forces besieged the city of Kunduz in Afghanistan, that Taliban, al-Qaeda and IMU fighters occupied, coalition forces eventually took the city, killing or wounding 2,000 enemy combatants and capturing 3,500 more, however 5,000 terrorists were airlifted by the Pakistan Air Force to North Pakistan.
Mid to Late November	Operation Trent takes place: Members of the 22nd SAS Regiment, supported by US forces, assaulted an al-Qaeda opium facility in the Registan Desert, Helmand/Kandahar Province, Afghanistan. They successfully cleared the facility, killing 18–73 al-Qaeda terrorists and Taliban fighters and capturing dozens more, whilst the SAS suffered 4 wounded.
November 25 – December 1	The Battle of Qala-i-Jangi takes place: Taliban, al-Qaeda and IMU prisoners begin an uprising at Qala-i-Jangi fortress in Afghanistan against its Northern Alliance guards and CIA interrogators, US, British and Northern Alliance forces eventually quell the uprising, out of a total of 300–500 enemy combatants, 86 were recapturied the rest were killed in the battle. 1 American was killed.
December 6–17	The Battle of Tora Bora takes place: Coalition forces almost captured/killed Osama Bin Laden in Pachir Aw Agam District, Nangarhar Province, Afghanistan, but he evaded them and later escaped into Pakistan, however, 200 al-Qaeda and Taliban fighters were killed.
December 10	In Iraqi Kurdistan, the two splinter groups that broke off from Islamic Movement of Kurdistan (IMK) that formed Jund al-Islam became Ansar al-Islam (AAI).
December 18	Operation Enduring Freedom – Kyrgyzstan begins.

== 2002 ==
Dates	Events
Unknown	A team of British SAS and Delta Force was sent into Indian-administered Kashmir to hunt for Osama bin Laden after receiving reports that he was being sheltered by the Kashmiri militant group HuM.
January	Guantanamo Bay detention camp was opened.
January 15	Operation Enduring Freedom – Philippines begins as part of Operation Enduring Freedom in the Southern Philippines.
January 16	The United Nations Security Council unanimously adopted Resolution 1390: imposing further sanctions on Osama bin Laden, Al-Qaeda, the Taliban and others associated with them.
January 28	8 al-Qaeda terrorists barricaded themselves inside Mirwais Hospital in Kandahar, Afghanistan, following a firefight with the terrorists Afghan soldiers, advised by a US Army Special Forces ODA, with the alleged involvement of JTF2, killing 6 and capturing 2.
February 27	The Georgia Train and Equip Program begins.
March 1–18	Operation Anaconda (including the Battle of Takur Ghar) takes place: Coalition forces succeed in removing al-Qaeda, IMU and Taliban presence from the Shah-i-Kot Valley in Afghanistan, killing 500–800 enemy combatants, 15 coalition troops are killed and another 82 wounded.
April 11	Al-Qaeda carries out the Ghriba synagogue bombing in Tunisia, killing 19 and injuring over 30 people, signalling the beginning of the Insurgency in the Maghreb.
April 15 – May 16	Operation Mountain Lion takes place in coordination with Operation Ptarmigan (a subsidiary operation of Operation Jacana), US forces, Australian SAS and other Coalition special forces and conventional forces aimed to find and deny control of the Gardez and Khost regions in Afghanistan to al-Qaeda terrorists and Taliban fighters. The operation resulted in small but fierce firefights with fighters who had infiltrated across the Pakistan border, Maj.Gen Franklin L. Hagenbeck said that al-Qaeda still possessed much of its leadership and command-and-control structure.
April 16 – July 9	Operation Jacana takes place: In the aftermath of Operation Anaconda, British, US, Australian and Norwegian forces conduct a series of operations aimed at finding and eliminating remaining al-Qaeda and Taliban in Khost province and Paktia Province in Afghanistan. 11 enemy combatants were killed and 9 more captured, a large number of weapons cashes were also captured and/or destroyed; the results of the operations also showed that al-Qaeda and the Taliban had abandoned a large scale presence in the region.
May 14	Members of the Lashkar-e-Taiba (LeT) carried out an attack on a tourist bus in India, killing 31 and injuring 47.
May 16	Operation Eagle Assist ends.
October 7	Operation Enduring Freedom – Horn of Africa begins.
October 8	The Faylaka Island attack in Kuwait killed 1 U.S. Marine and injured another.
October 12	Jemaah Islamiyah (JI) and other al-Qaeda terrorists carried the Bali bombings in Indonesia which killed 202 and injured 209 people.
October 16	The Iraq Resolution is enacted after being passed by the United States Congress, authorizing military action against Iraq.
November 8	The United Nations Security Council unanimously adopted Resolution 1441: offering Saddam Hussein's regime "a final opportunity to comply with its disarmament obligations" that had been set out in several previous resolutions.
November 26	The Central Intelligence Agency begins a series of ongoing Predator drone strikes on Al-Qaeda in Yemen and al-Qaeda in Saudi Arabia.
November 28	Al-Qaeda carried out the Mombasa attacks in Kenya, killing 13 and injuring 80 people.

== 2003 ==
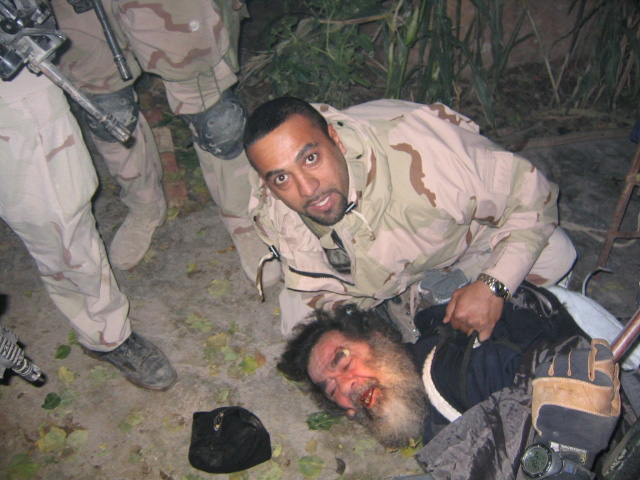
Saddam Hussein being pulled from his hideaway in Operation Red Dawn, 13 December 2003.

Dates	Events
January 3 – April 12	Anti-war groups across the world organized public protests against war with Iraq. About 36 million people across the globe took part in almost 3,000 protests.
January 27	US Special forces and Afghan forces were searching a compound in the mountains near Spin Boldak, Kandahar province, Afghanistan when they were engaged by 3 fighters loyal to the Hezb-e Islami Gulbuddin (HIG) (that was designated a terrorist group on February 19), killing one, wounding and capturing another. After they interrogated the prisoner they divulged the location of 80 other HIG fighters in the mountains, they called in air support from B-1 bombers, F-16s, AC-130s and Apache helicopters, before Coalition troops moved in. At least 18 HIG fighters were killed, it was the largest engagement since Operation Anaconda.
February 5	Colin Powell addressed a plenary session of the United Nations Security Council, stating categorically that Saddam Hussein was working to obtain key components to produce nuclear weapons.
February 19	The HIG was designated a terrorist group-for several months its leader, Gulbuddin Hekmatyar, had been trying to consolidate the remnants of al-Qaeda and the Taliban into one anti-Coalition force.
March 20	The Iraq War begins with the Invasion of Iraq. President George W. Bush refers to it as "the central front in the war on terror".
March 28–30	Operation Viking Hammer takes place: US Forces and Iraqi Kurdish forces eliminated AAI terrorists and its allies who had occupied parts of Iraqi Kurdistan, killing around 150–200 Ansar al Islam terrorists and 100 more terrorist-allied fighters were killed, Iraqi Kurdish forces suffered 30 killed, 23 wounded.
April 19	The US Joint Special Operations Command's Task Force 20 captured Mohammed Abbas, the leader of the Palestinian Liberation Front, in Baghdad, Iraq. US authorities cited Abbas's presence in Baghdad as evidence that Iraq had been harboring international terrorists
May 16	Salafia Jihadia-a Salafi jihadist militant group with links to al-Qaeda and associated with the GICM-carried out the Casablanca bombings in Morocco, killing 45 and injuring over 100 people.
Spring–September 20 or November	Small groups of foreign jihadists that infiltrated Iraq following the invasion, as well as nationalist Sunni Iraqis, merged with the remnants of AAI who had fled to Iran and/or infiltrated Iraq to form Ansar al-Sunnah (AAS).
August 5	JI and al-Qaeda terrorists carried out the Marriott Hotel bombing in Indonesia which killed 12 and injured 150 people.
October 2	Pakistani forces (allegedly in a joint mission with US forces) attacked an al-Qaeda hideout in South Waziristan killing Hasan Mahsum, the leader of the East Turkestan Islamic Movement (ETIM) and 7 others.
October 23	The leader of the Algerian terrorist faction Salafist Group for Preaching and Combat (GSPC), Hassan Hattab, was replaced by Nabil Sahraoui, who declared the groups allegiance to al-Qaeda.
October 31	Members of the 22nd SAS Regiment and Delta Force, supported by other US troops, conducted Operation Abalone: Its target was a Sudanese jihadist-who was believed to be facilitating the arrival of Islamist terrorists into Iraq-in compounds/dwellings on the outskirts of Ramadi, Iraq. The operation was a success; the Sudanese jihadist is believed to have been killed along with a dozen other terrorists, 4 foreign jihadists were also captured-finding some of the first actual proof of an internationalist jihadist movement that emerged in post-invasion Iraq. 1 UKSF soldier was killed and several others wounded.
November 15 and 20	The Istanbul bombings in Turkey by al-Qaeda killed 57 and injured around 700 people.
December 13	Operation Red Dawn takes place: Saddam Hussein is found and captured by U.S. forces in Ad-Dawr, Iraq.
Unknown	Noordin Mohammad Top, a senior terrorist in JI, is said to have split from the group and formed al-Qaeda in the Malay Archipelago.

== 2004 ==
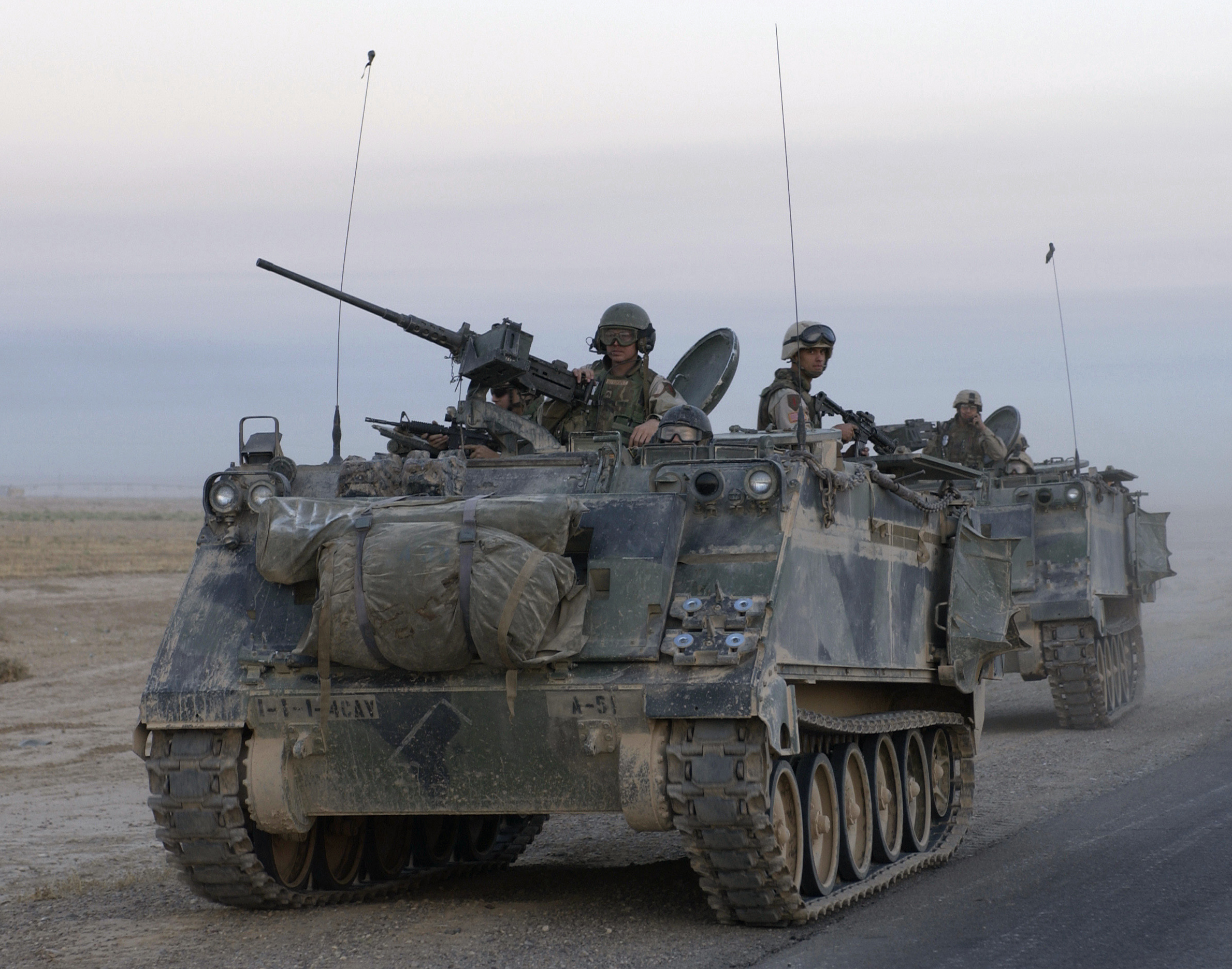
U.S. Army M106 mortar carriers of the 1st Infantry Division leaving Samarra after conducting an assault there during the Battle of Samarra, 1 October 2004.

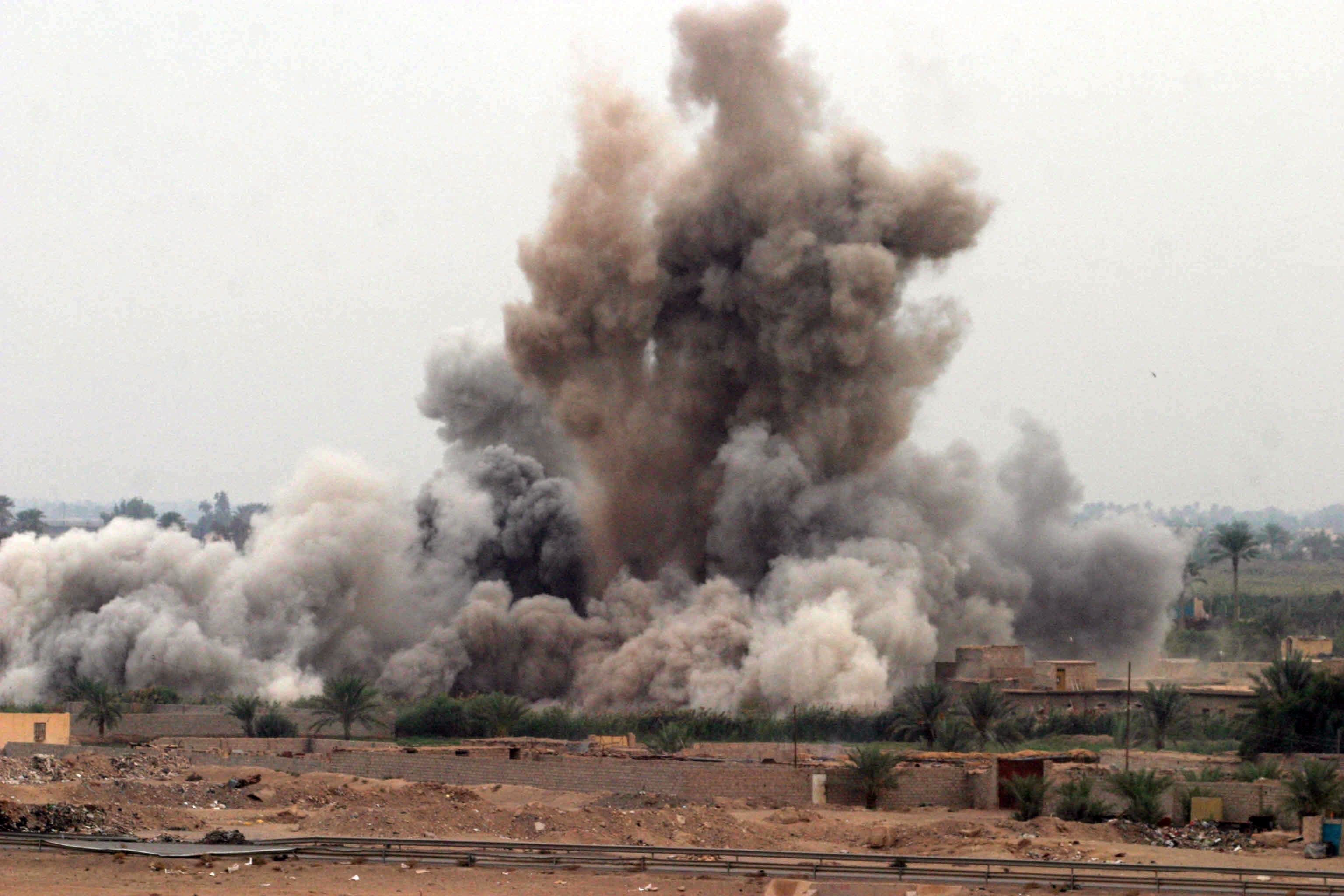
An airstrike destroys a suspected insurgent hideout in Fallujah during the Second Battle of Fallujah, 8 November 2004.

Dates	Events
February 27	Abu Sayyaf (ASG) carryout the SuperFerry 14 bombing in the Philippines, killing 116 people.
March 11	The Madrid train bombings in Spain kill 193 and injure over 2,000 people, the attack was carried out by an al-Qaeda cell.
March 16	War in North-West Pakistan begins with the Battle of Wana between Pakistani forces and al-Qaeda.
March 23	The Battle of Wana ends, Pakistani forces lost 49 soldiers killed, 11 soldiers captured, 33 soldiers wounded, whilst al-Qaeda suffered 55 killed and 150 more captured.
April 4 – May 1	The First Battle of Fallujah takes place: Following the Fallujah ambush on March 31, the US military launched an operation to regain control of Fallujah from Jama'at al-Tawhid wal-Jihad (JTJ) terrorists and other insurgents. On April 9 US troops were ordered to halt their offensive, after having cleared at least 25% of the city and declare a ceasefire after political pressure from the Iraqi Governing Council and the negative media coverage by Al Jazeera and Al Arabiya of the battle effecting public opinion. By the end of April, US forces gave control of the city to the Fallujah Brigade-a Sunni security force formed by the CIA; 27 US troops were killed in the operation, whilst 184–228 terrorists and insurgents were killed. By September, the Brigade dissolved and turned over all its weapons and soldiers to terrorist and insurgent groups in the city.
April 24	The Georgia Train and Equip Program ends
May 29	Members of al-Qaeda and its affiliates carryout the Khobar massacre in Saudi Arabia, which kills 22 and injures 25 people.
June 18	The United States government, led by the CIA's Special Activities Division, begins a series of ongoing attacks on targets in northwest Pakistan using drones (unmanned aerial vehicles). These attacks sought to defeat the Taliban and Al-Qaeda militants who were thought to have found a safe haven in Pakistan.
June 20	The leader of the GSPC, Nabil Sahraoui, was killed along with 3 of his lieutenants/aides in a shootout with the Algerian army during a "vast anti-terror operation" involving 3,000 soldiers in a sweep of wooded mountains in Bejaia Province in Algeria.
September 1–3	The Beslan school siege takes place: 34 terrorists belonging to Riyad-us Saliheen Brigade of Martyrs took over a school in Beslan, North Ossetia-Alania, Russia, taking 1,100 people as hostages. Russian security forces eventually stormed the building with the use of tanks, armored vehicles, heavy weapons and attack helicopters; the rescue operation killed 334 hostages and 10 civilians and injured approximately 783; 31 terrorists were killed and over 10 of the security force was killed.
September 9	The bombing of the Australian Embassy in Jakarta, Indonesia, by JI killed 8 and wounded 150 people.
October 1–3	The Battle of Samarra takes place: In the run up to the January 2005 Iraqi election, the Iraqi Interim Government and the Coalition began a campaign to clear Samarra and Fallujah of JTJ and other insurgent's control, thereby ending the violence towards security forces and civilians and securing the election. US and Iraqi forces liberated Samarra after 3 days of fighting, resulting in 127 terrorists and other insurgents killed with a further 60 wounded and 128 captured, Coalition forces lost 1 killed and 8 wounded.
October 17	The JTJ became known as Tanzim Qaidat al-Jihad fi Bilad al-Rafidayn-commonly known as al-Qaeda in Iraq (AQI), when its leader, Abu Musab al-Zarqawi, allegiance to Osama bin Laden's al-Qaeda network.
November 7 – December 23	The Second Battle of Fallujah takes place: US, UK and Iraqi forces launch an offensive to liberate Fallujah from AQI and AAS terrorists, as well as other insurgents and terrorists, killing 1,200–1,500 enemy combatants, whilst 1,500 more were captured, coalition forces suffered 107 killed and 613 wounded.
November 8–16	The Battle of Mosul takes place after AQI terrorists and other insurgents began carrying out coordinated attacks and ambushes in an attempt to take over the city, US, Iraqi security forces and Kurdish forces counterattacked, retaking terrorist and insurgent held areas, which ended major fighting on November 16, however the western area and parts of the eastern city remained in insurgent hands. The US lost 4 killed, whilst Iraqi forces suffered 116 killed and 5,000 deserted, 1 British and 1 Turkish security contractors were killed; 71 terrorists and insurgents were confirmed killed.

== 2005 ==
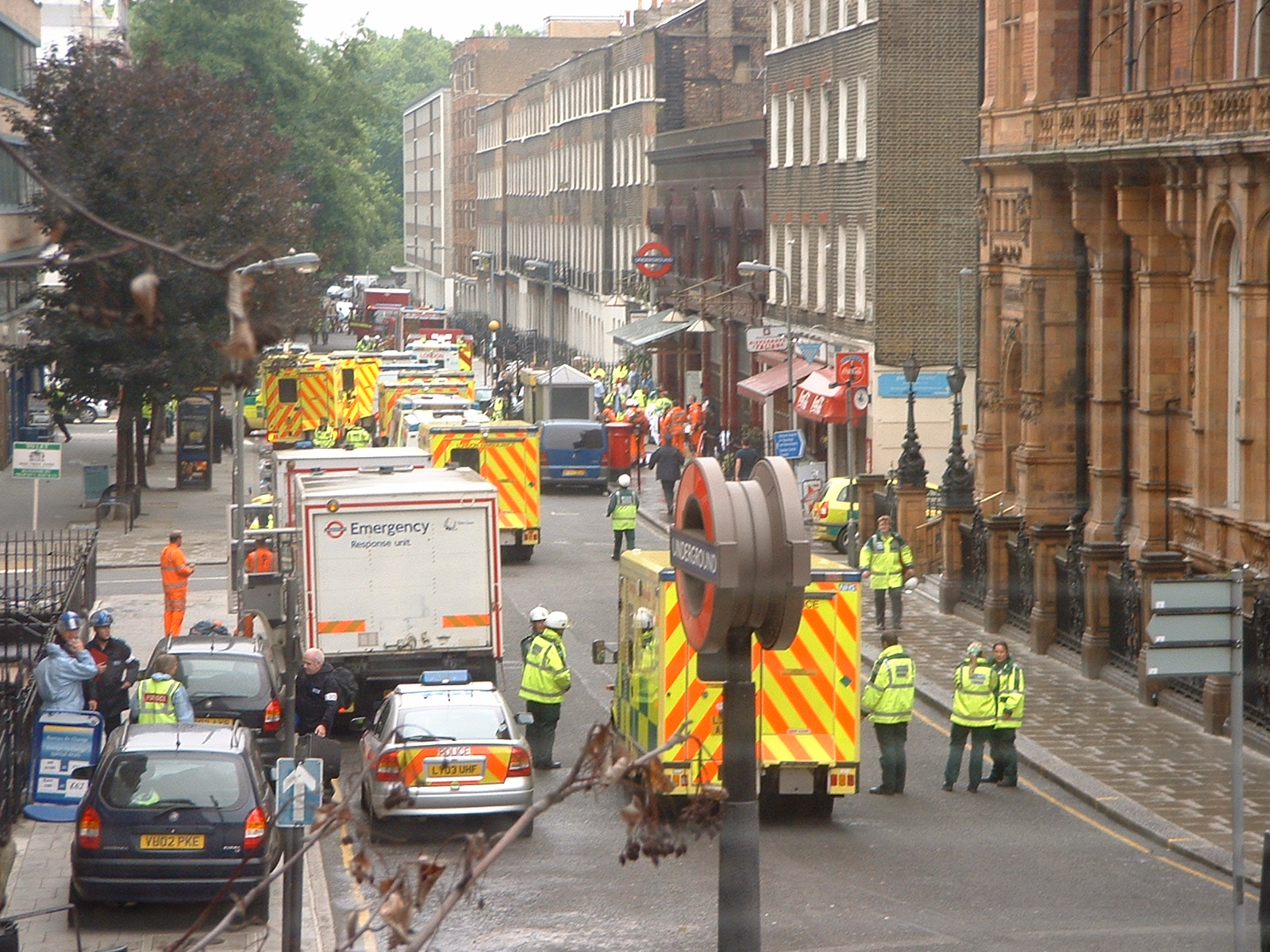
Emergency vehicles at Russell Square after the 7 July 2005 London bombings.

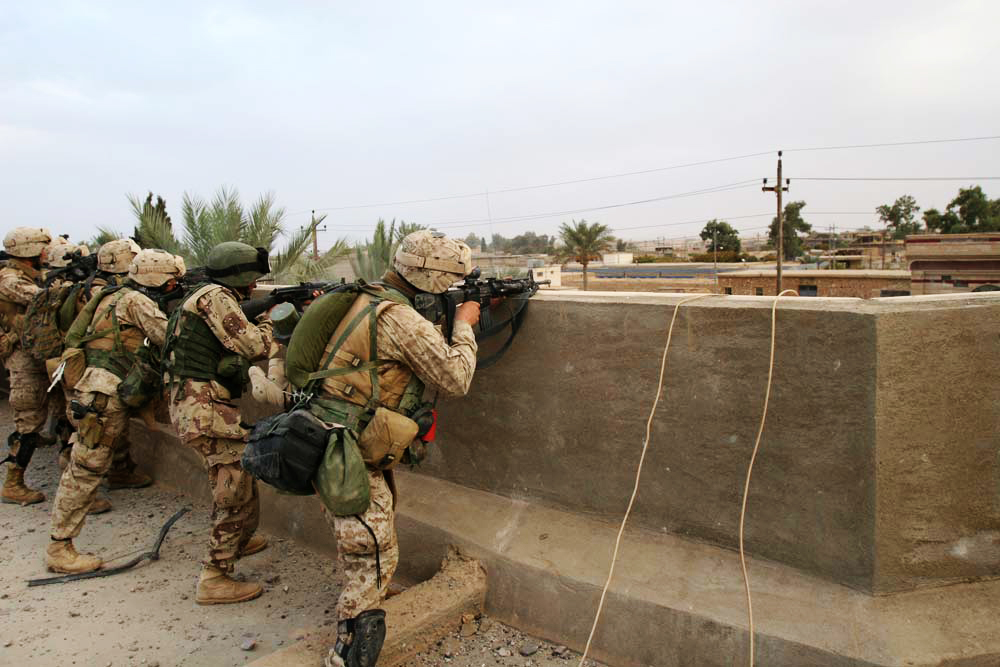
U.S. Marines from the 2nd Marine Division and an Iraqi soldier engage insurgents during Operation Steel Curtain, a subsidiary operation of Operation Sayeed, 7 November 2005.

Dates	Events
January 1	The Georgia Sustainment and Stability Operations Program begins.
May 8–19	Operation Matador takes place: In an effort to stem the flow of terrorists and insurgents entering Iraq from Syria, US Marines fought and secured the Ubaydi and the town of Ramana, suffering 9 killed and 40 wounded, whilst the AQI terrorists and other insurgents lost an estimated 144 killed and 90 captured. US forces did not garrison the towns and insurgents resumed control over the city.
July 7	The London bombings kill 52 people and injure 700 more.
July 23	Operation Marlborough takes place: members of the British Special Boat Service, with support from elements of the 22nd SAS Regiment and U.S. military assaulted an AQI safehouse in southern Baghdad and killed 3 terrorists who were about to carryout major suicide bombings.
July–December 22	Operation Sayeed takes place: known as an "umbrella" operation-where a number of subsidiary operations took place under it. The operations took place in Al Anbar Governorate in Iraq and were aimed at significantly removing AQI's presence from the Western Euphrates River Valley; to ensure there was a secure "climate" and "environment" to conduct a referendum in October and national elections in December 2005; and to secure control of the Iraqi border to the Iraqi people. The operation was a success-causing significant disruption to AQI's organization that had a lasting effect across Al-Anbar Governorate; in addition to destroying much of the AQI leadership and command-and-control functions, the operation also ensured the safety and maximum participation of Iraqi citizens in the constitutional referendum and national elections. The US lost 54 killed and 324 wounded, Iraqi security forces lost 16 killed and 89 wounded; the terrorists and insurgents lost between 727 and almost 1,000 killed; between 2,308 and almost 4,000 captured; and 64 wounded.
September 1–18	The Battle of Tal Afar takes place: US and Iraqi forces carried out a military operation to eliminate AQI terrorists and other insurgents from Tal Afar in Iraq, which the terrorists were using as a staging ground for moving foreign fighters into Iraq since early 2005. Coalition forces succeeded in their objectives at the cost of US forces losing 6 killed, 52 Wounded and Iraqi forces losing 15 killed and 36 wounded. Terrorists and insurgent groups lost 163 killed and between 295 and 700 captured.
October 1	JI carried out the Bali Bombings in Indonesia, which killed 20 and injured more than 100 people.
November 9	The Amman bombings in Jordan kill 60 and injured 115 people, AQI carried out the attack.
November 26	The Christian Peacemaker hostage crisis in Iraq begins when 4 members of the Christian Peacemaker Teams were abducted in Baghdad by members of the terrorist group Swords of Righteousness Brigade-a small offshoot of possibly IAI, AAI, Army of Islam, or a cover name for their abduction cells, or freelance cash criminal abductors.

== 2006 ==
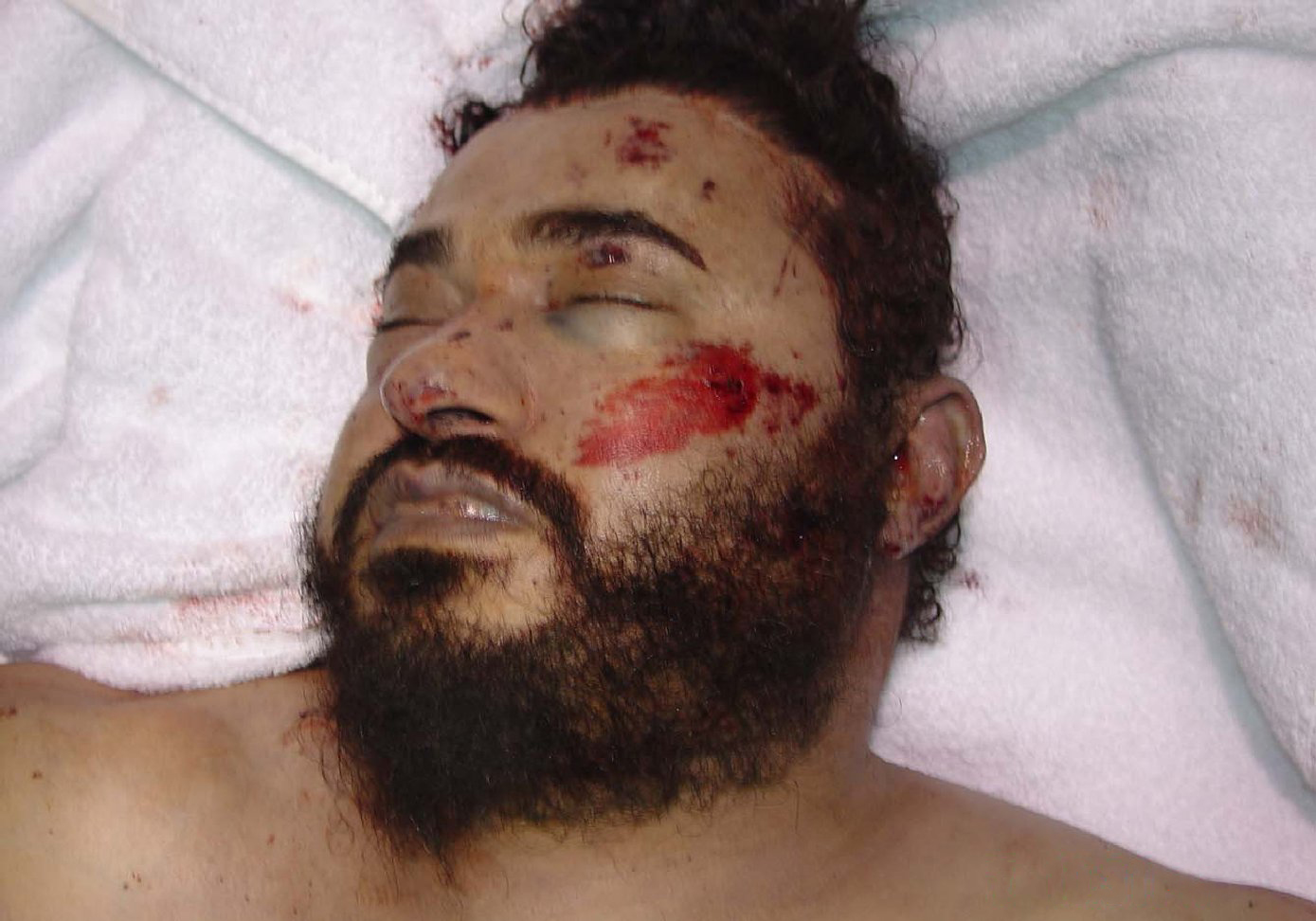
Corpse of Abu Musab al-Zarqawi, the leader of AQI, who was killed in a U.S. airstrike in Hibhib, 7 June 2006.

Dates	Events
January 15	AQI was one of five or six other Sunni insurgent groups that formed the Mujahideen Shura Council (MSC) that embraced the same Salafist ideology as AQI.
March	DEVGRU operators and US Army Rangers carried out an operation allegedly under the codename Operation Vigilant Harvest. Their target was an al-Qaeda training camp in North Waziristan in Pakistan, they were flown across the Afghan-Pakistan border. The force killed as many as 30 terrorists, including the Chechen camp commandant Imam Asad. The operation has been falsely credited to the Pakistani Special Service Group.
March 23	The Christian Peacemaker hostage crisis in Iraq is brought to a successful conclusion when members of the 22nd SAS Regiment raided a house in western Baghdad and rescued the 3 remaining hostages, the raid was part of Operation Lightwater: The operation initiated by Task Force Knight (the British special forces task force in Iraq) supported by JTF2 and Canadian and US intelligence units.
April 16	Operation Larchwood 4 takes place: Members of the 22nd SAS Regiment, supported by US forces, carried out a raid on an AQI-occupied farmhouse Yusufiyah in Iraq, the target for the operation was to capture a mid-level terrorist leader. The SAS suffered 5 wounded but killed 5 terrorists and captured their target and another senior AQI terrorist, whom revealed around May 20 information that eventually led to discovery of Abu Musab al-Zarqawi, the leader of AQI.
April 28 – December 25	AQI (from mid-October it was reformed as ISI) succeeded in carrying out a coordinated offensive to take control of Diyala Governorate in Iraq, where Abu Musab al-Zarqawi, the leader of AQI and the Mujahideen Shura Council (MSC) designated the Governorate as his Islamic caliphate with Baquba as its capital (where he based his headquarters). Baquba fell on December 25, leading to the start of the Diyala campaign.
June 4	Islamist insurgents begin taking over large parts of Somalia.
June 7	2 U.S. F-16C Jets carryout an airstrike on a farmhouse/safehouse in Hibhib a village outside Baquba in Iraq, killing AQI's leader Abu Musab al-Zarqawi.
June 17 – November 15	The Second Battle of Ramadi takes place: U.S. and Iraqi forces mostly drive AQI (from mid-October it was reformed as ISI) and other Sunni insurgents out of their de facto capital: Ramadi, 750 militants were killed, the US lost 80+ killed and 200+ wounded whilst the Iraq lost 30 troops and policemen killed.
July 9 – October 24	Operation Together Forward takes place: US and Iraqi forces, supported by British forces carryout the operation to counter AQI's (later reformed as ISI) determination to make its attacks on Baghdad a central role in its plans to undermine the new Iraqi government, as well as reduce the sectarian violence in the city in order to strengthen the Iraqi government and security forces. The operation failed, terrorists and other insurgents infiltrated back into cleared areas, the violence escalated and Iraqi security forces appeared insufficient. US forces suffered 101 killed and 1 captured, Iraqi security forces lost 197 killed; whilst over 400 terrorists and other insurgents were killed or captured.
July 20	The Somalia War (2006–2009) begins when U.S. backed Ethiopian troops invaded Somalia to support the Somali Transitional Government against Islamist insurgents
August 17	The Second Battle of Habbaniyah begins: Taking place in the urban sprawl between Fallujah and Ramadi, one of the most vicious and protracted battles of the Iraq war took place.
Mid-October	Al-Qaeda announced the creation of Islamic state of Iraq (ISI) with Ramadi as its capital. replacing the MSC and its AQI.
November 5	Saddam Hussein is sentenced to death by hanging, he is hanged on December 30 at Camp Justice in Baghdad, Iraq.
December	Around this time, Al-Shabaab-previously serving as the Islamic Courts Union's military wing-emerged as an independent organization after breaking away from the ICU, which had by then splintered into several smaller factions after its defeat by Somali TFG and Ethiopian forces.

== 2007 ==
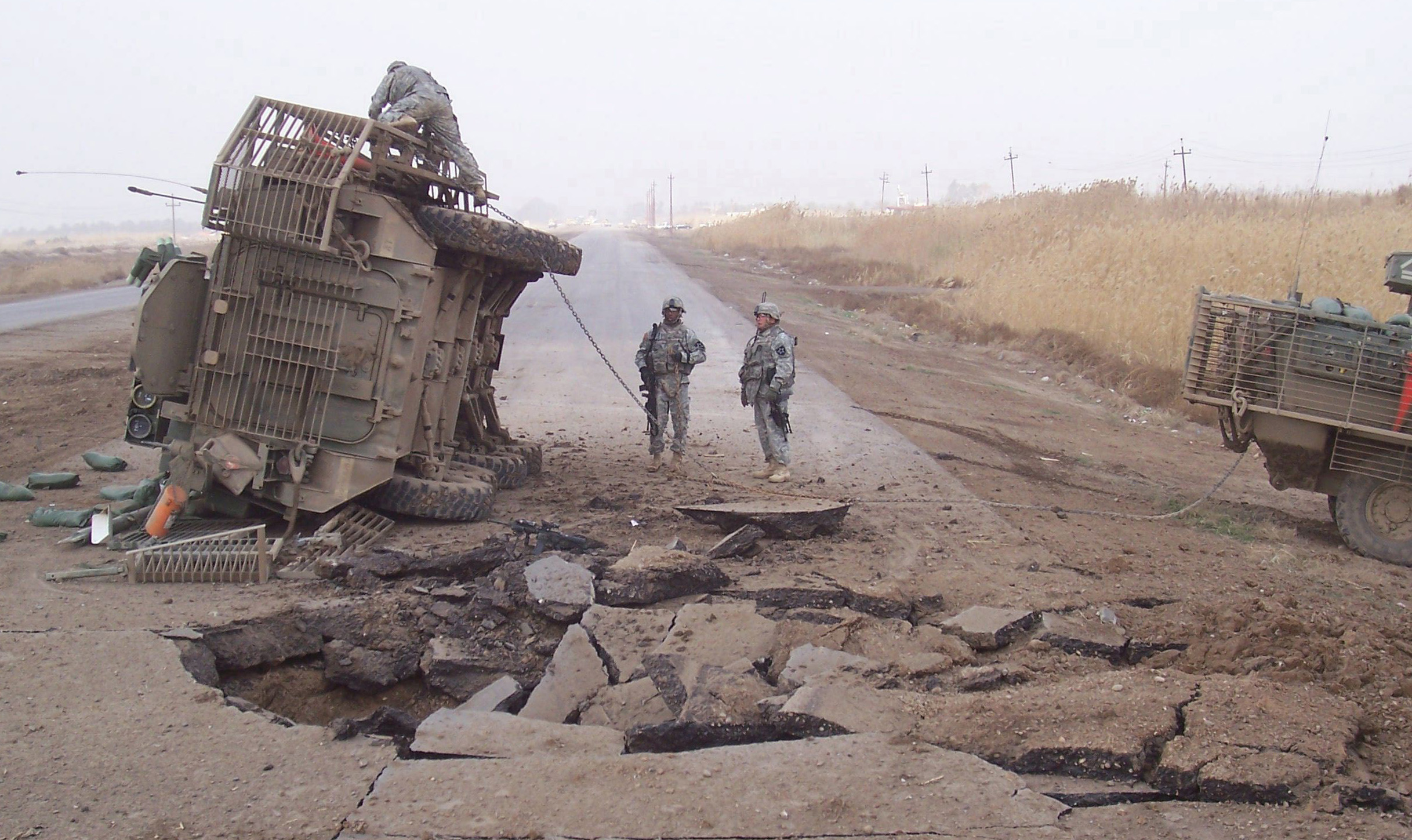
A US Army Stryker following an IED blast near a village outside Baghdad, during Operation Imposing Law, 15 April 2007.

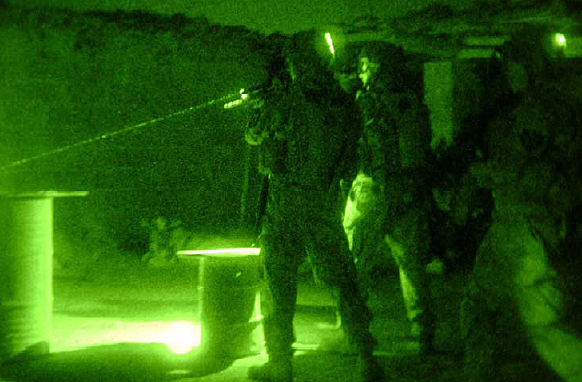
U.S. soldiers from the 2nd Infantry Division clearing a village on the outskirts of Baqubah as part of Operation Arrowhead Ripper during the Battle of Baqubah, 19 June 2007.

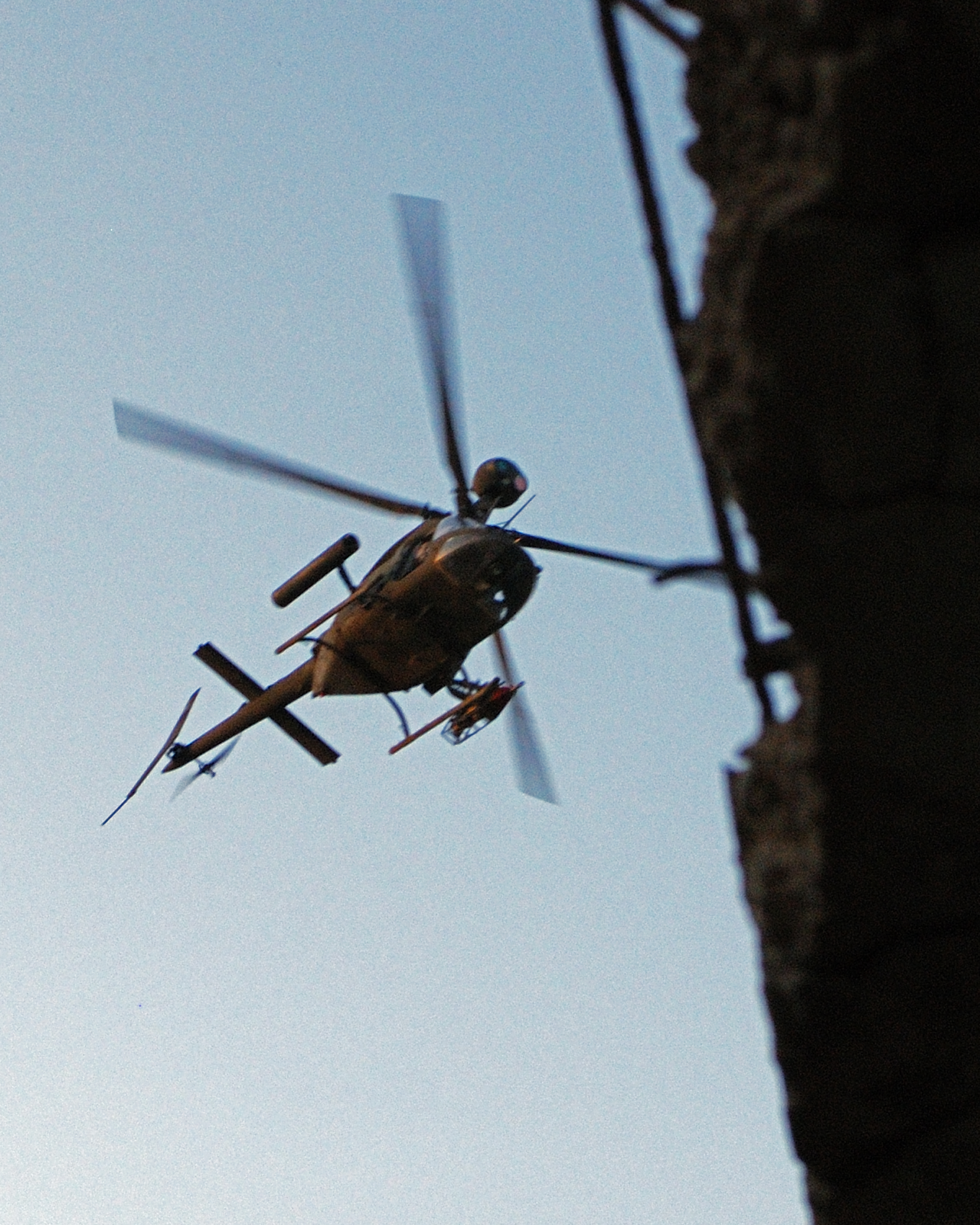
An OH-58D Kiowa provides air support to coalition troops during Operation Marne Torch I, as part of Operation Phantom Thunder, 28 June 2007.

Dates	Events
January 5–12	The Battle of Ras Kamboni takes place: Ethiopian and the Somali TFG forces supported by US AC-130 gunship fought for control of Ras Kamboni, Somalia, from ICU, OLF, al-Qaeda operatives and other affiliated militants and to eliminate them. 16 enemy combatants were killed and 44 civilians were killed
January 6–9 and January 24	The Battle of Haifa Street takes place: Iraqi troops killed 30 Sunni insurgents at a fake checkpoint, in retaliation 27 Shias were killed and the rest threatened, on January 8, US and Iraqi troops launched an offensive to clear out the area of ISI terrorists and insurgents, killing or capturing 70 terrorists and other insurgents, 25 others were detained. The area was temporarily cleared but insurgents reinfiltated the area, on January 24, US and Iraqi forces conducted Operation Tomahawk Strike II to clear the area, approximately 65 insurgents and terrorists were killed and captured. 20 Iraqi soldiers were killed during both engagements.
January 11	Delta Force operators and other US forces raided the Iranian Liaison Office in Irbil, Iraq, intelligence from the raid produced evidence that Iran had connections with AAS in an effort to undermine the coalition efforts in Iraq.
January 28	The GSPC changed its name to al-Qaeda in the Islamic Maghreb (AQIM).
February 6	Operation Juniper Shield begins.
February 11	The Algiers bombings in Algeria by al-Qaeda kill 33 and injure over 130 people.
February 14	The Second Battle of Habbaniyah ends in a Coalition victory after causing the flow of supplies and terrorists into the major cities of Iraq to dry up permanently; some 14 US Marines and 37 insurgents were killed.
February 14 – November 24	Coalition forces carryout Operation Imposing Law to secure Baghdad from ISI terrorists and other insurgent's control (which was estimated as high as 70%) and reducing the sectarian violence. The operation later became part of Operation Phantom Thunder in June when US and Iraqi forces cleared the northern and southern flanks of the city; by November the operation was declared a success. The violence was reduced and most of the city cam under coalition control. 872 Coalition members were killed and over 1,200 terrorists and insurgents were killed.
March 10 – August 19	The Battle of Baqubah in Iraq took place: US and Iraqi forces began clearing Buhriz and eastern half of Baqubah of insurgents and ISI terrorists from their de facto capital. On 18 June, as part of Operation Phantom Thunder, US forces commenced Operation Arrowhead Ripper an offensive operations from the west, the operation ended on August 19 with the city largely being secured, although the insurgent presence remained in the city and surrounding areas, it was not in large numbers. US forces lost 31 killed and 55 wounded, Iraqi forces lost 13 killed and 15 wounded; over 227 terrorists and other insurgents were killed and 100 more were detained.
March	The al-Qaeda Kurdish Battalions (AQKB) formed.
May 20 – September 7	The Lebanon conflict takes place: The Lebanese security forces began fighting Jund al-Sham and Fatah al-Islam, the conflict ended in a Lebanese victory, with Lebanese forces suffering 170–179 killed and 406–500 wounded, 238 terrorists were killed and a further 233 wounded, 65 civilians were also killed, whilst UN forces in Lebanon lost 6 soldiers killed and 2 wounded.
May 31 – June 1	It was reported that following clashes between the local militia or police and 35 Islamist militants who arrived in the area by boat-which forced the militants into nearby hills or to escape by sea, the USS Chafee bombarded an ICU camp in the mountains near Bargal in Somalia. Al-Qaeda terrorists and the remnants of the ICU and other Islamists militants were gathered at the camp, "actionable intelligence" gathered by U.S. Special Operations Forces and local tribal leaders suggested that Fazul Abdullah Mohammed, head of intelligence for the ICU and a leader of al Qaeda's East Africa network, and other High Valued Targets were in the area. Some of the Islamists escaped by boat or inland, 5 militia and/or police were wounded whilst a dozen Islamists were killed.
June 16 – August 14	Operation Phantom Thunder took place: Multi-National Force-Iraq carryout out major offensive operations across Iraq against ISI terrorists and other insurgents and jihadists, resulting in a strategic coalition victory by occupying and ejecting the insurgents from their strongholds in Northern Babil, eastern Anbar, Diyala Governorate and the southern outskirts of Baghdad. Coalition forces also conducted intelligence raids against ISI and Iranian-backed cells nationwide, with emphasis on cells in Baghdad, Diyala, and central and northern Iraq. The US suffered 140 troops killed, 220 Iraqi security forces and 20 killed allied Iraqi militia killed; terrorists and other insurgents lost 1,196 killed and 6,702 captured.
August 15	Operation Phantom Strike begins: Following up the success of Operation Phantom Thunder, Coalition forces in Iraq carried out operations aimed at disrupting the ISI and other terrorist and insurgent networks across the country, targeting terrorists and extremists fleeing Baghdad and other key cities with particular focus on remaining ISI terrorists and Iranian-supported insurgent groups.
October 1	The Diyala campaign in Iraq ends in a Coalition victory due to the combination of the Coalition victories in the Battle of Baqubah, Operations Phantom Thunder and Operation Phantom Strike-where in August and September, Operation Lightning Hammer I & II took place respectively, as part of Operation Phantom Strike which defeated ISI (particularly the elements that fled from Baqubah) and other terrorist cells seeking safe haven throughout the Diyala River Valley. 106 US servicemen were killed, 300 Iraqi security forces were killed and 22 allied Iraqi militia were killed, Over 1,070 terrorists and other insurgents were killed and 500 captured.
October 5 – December 8	The First Battle of Swat took place after more than 3,000 Pakistani troops were sent to Swat Valley and Shangla in Khyber-Pakhtunkhwa Province, Pakistan, to confront TTP and the TNSM, resulting in more than killing more than 290 terrorists and capturing 143 more. Pakistani forces suffered 18 killed and 48 captured.
October 7	Dokka Umarov, the President of Ichkeria of Chechen Republic of Ichkeria (an unrecognized pro-independence movement that controlled most of Chechnya in Russia) abolished the movement announced the creation of the terrorist group Caucasus Emirate and declared himself its Emir.
November or December	AAS formally acknowledged being derived from AAI, and reverted to using that name.
December	The existence of the Tehrik-i-Taliban Pakistan (TTP) was officially announced under the leadership of Baitullah Mehsud.

== 2008 ==
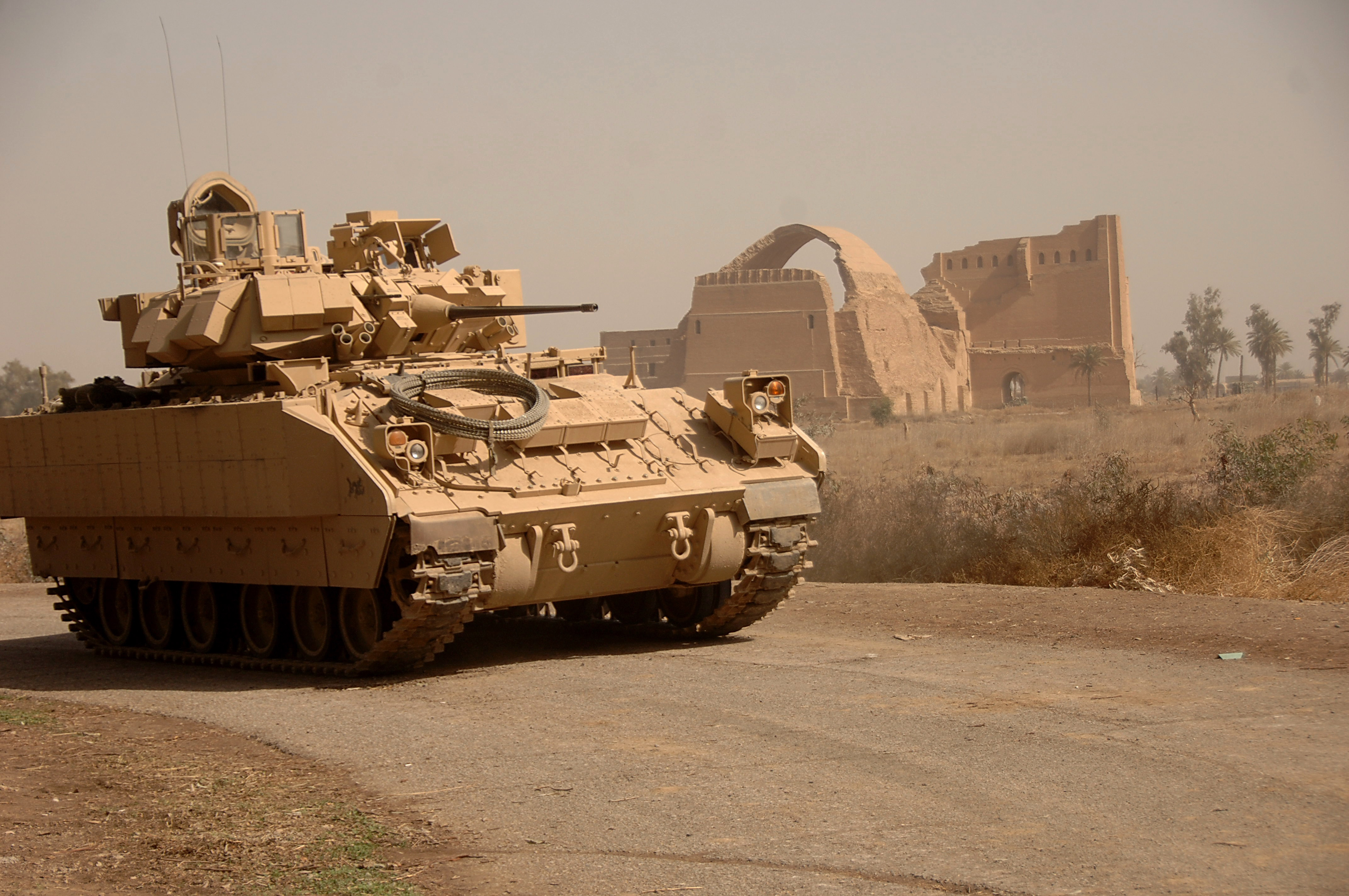
A US Army Bradley Fighting Vehicle of the 3rd Infantry Division providing security for clearing operation in Salman Pak, Iraq, during Operation Phantom Phoenix. 16 February 2008.

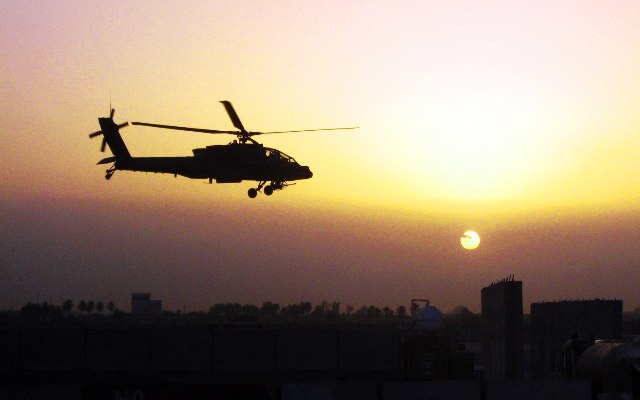
A US Army AH-64D of the 4th Aviation Regiment flies over Iraq in support of ground forces during Operation Phantom Phoenix. 20 July 2008

Dates	Events
Unknown	Operation Enduring Freedom – Caribbean and Central America begins
January	Operation Phantom Strike ends having disrupted the terrorist network in Iraq. 11 US servicemen were killed, over 330 terrorist were killed and 83 were captured.
January 8 – July 28	Operation Phantom Phoenix took place: Following the success of Operation Phantom Thunder and Operation Phantom Strike, the offensive operation aimed to further reduce violence and secure Iraq's population throughout central and northern Iraq particularly in Baghdad. The Operation was only a partial victory, in particular, the Coalition succeeded in clearing Diyala Governorate almost entirely of insurgent forces; insurgents in Nineveh Governorate manage to maintain a significant presence in Mosul and the surrounding areas, albeit isolated; and Kirkuk province was declared secured by the Iraqi Army in May but the insurgents returned. Multinational Force Iraq lost 839 killed, 11 captured and 2 missing, whilst the terrorist and other insurgents lost 890 killed and over 2,500 captured.
April 6	The Battle of Shok Valley takes place: U.S. Aircraft supporting U.S. Special forces, as well as Afghan special forces raided a fortified town in Shok Valley of Nuristan Province in Afghanistan, occupied by HIG in an attempt to eliminate Gulbuddin Hekmatyar. The raid failed to eliminate him, U.S. forces suffered multiple wounded, ANA suffered 2 killed and multiple wounded.
June 2	The Danish embassy bombing in Islamabad in Pakistan, by al-Qaeda killed between 6–8 people and injured over 20.
July 13	The Battle of Wanat took place: between 200 and 500 militants from the Taliban, al-Qaeda and HIG attacked an outpost in Nuristan province in Afghanistan, garrisoned by US and Afghan troops, the attack was repulsed, 9 US soldiers and 15 more wounded, 4 Afghan soldiers were wounded and at least 40 Taliban fighters killed during the assault.
July 29 – August 11	Operation Augurs of Prosperity took place, US and Iraqi forces following up Operation Phantom Phoenix's success in Iraq's Diyala province the Operation aimed to clear the last remnants of ISI terrorists and other insurgents and terrorists from the Governorate. The operation was a success, with Iraqi security forces having achieved half of the goals set for the operation, with 15 terrorists and other insurgents killed and 800 captured, Iraqi Security forces lost 51 killed and Awakening Councils losing 7 killed.
August 7	The Battle of Bajaur begins: Pakistani forces launch an offensive to retake, Bajaur in Khyber-Pakhtunkhwa Province, Pakistan, from TTP, Al-Qaeda and the TNSM.
August 18	The Uzbin Valley ambush takes place when French, Afghan and US troops were ambushed by HIG and Taliban insurgents in Kabul province, Afghanistan, the coalition troops with air support and reinforcements eventually defeated the terrorists and insurgents. French forces lost 10 killed and 24 wounded, whilst Afghan forces lost 4 wounded; the terrorists and insurgents lost between 13 and 80 killed with another 30 wounded.
August 20–22	The Battle of Kismayo (2008) takes place: Al-Shabaab terrorists, allied with local Islamist militias that were formerly of the ICU, captured the port in Somalia.
September 11	The Cyberwarfare section of JSOC shut down every jihadist Website that was known to them.
September 17	The Islamic Jihad of Yemen carryout the attack on the American Embassy in Yemen, killing 6 and injuring 12 people.
October 26	The Abu Kamal raid takes place: U.S. SOF cross into Syria via helicopter and eliminated Abu Ghadiya who was primarily involved in al-Qaeda's logistic effort in Iraq and assisted in smuggling weapons, money and fighters across the Syria-Iraq border and several other militants.
November 26–29	The Mumbai attacks in India by LeT terrorists kill 156–164 and injure 293-600+ people

== 2009 ==
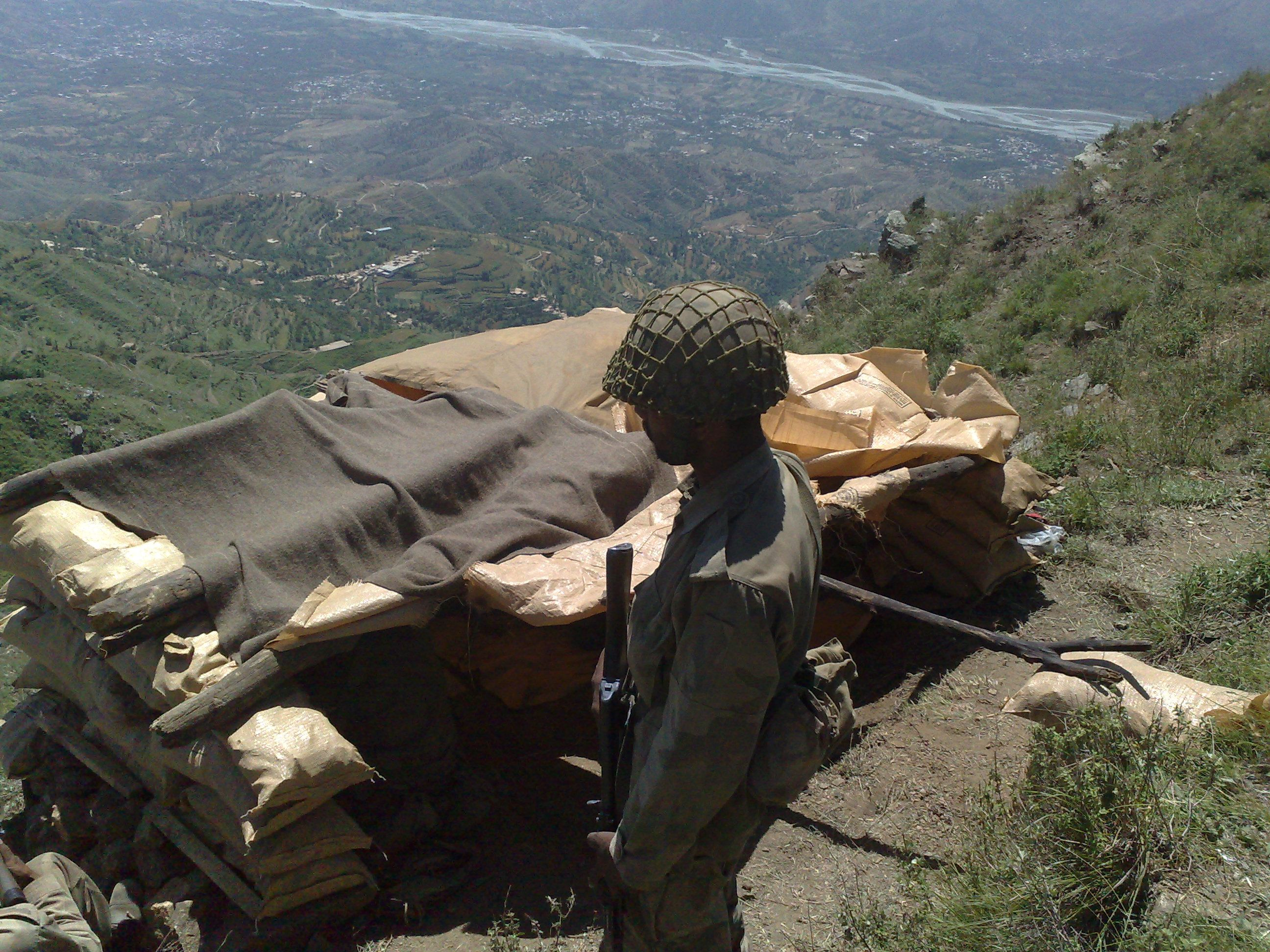
Pakistani soldiers at an emplacement in the Swat Valley, during the Second Battle of Swat, 22 May 2009.

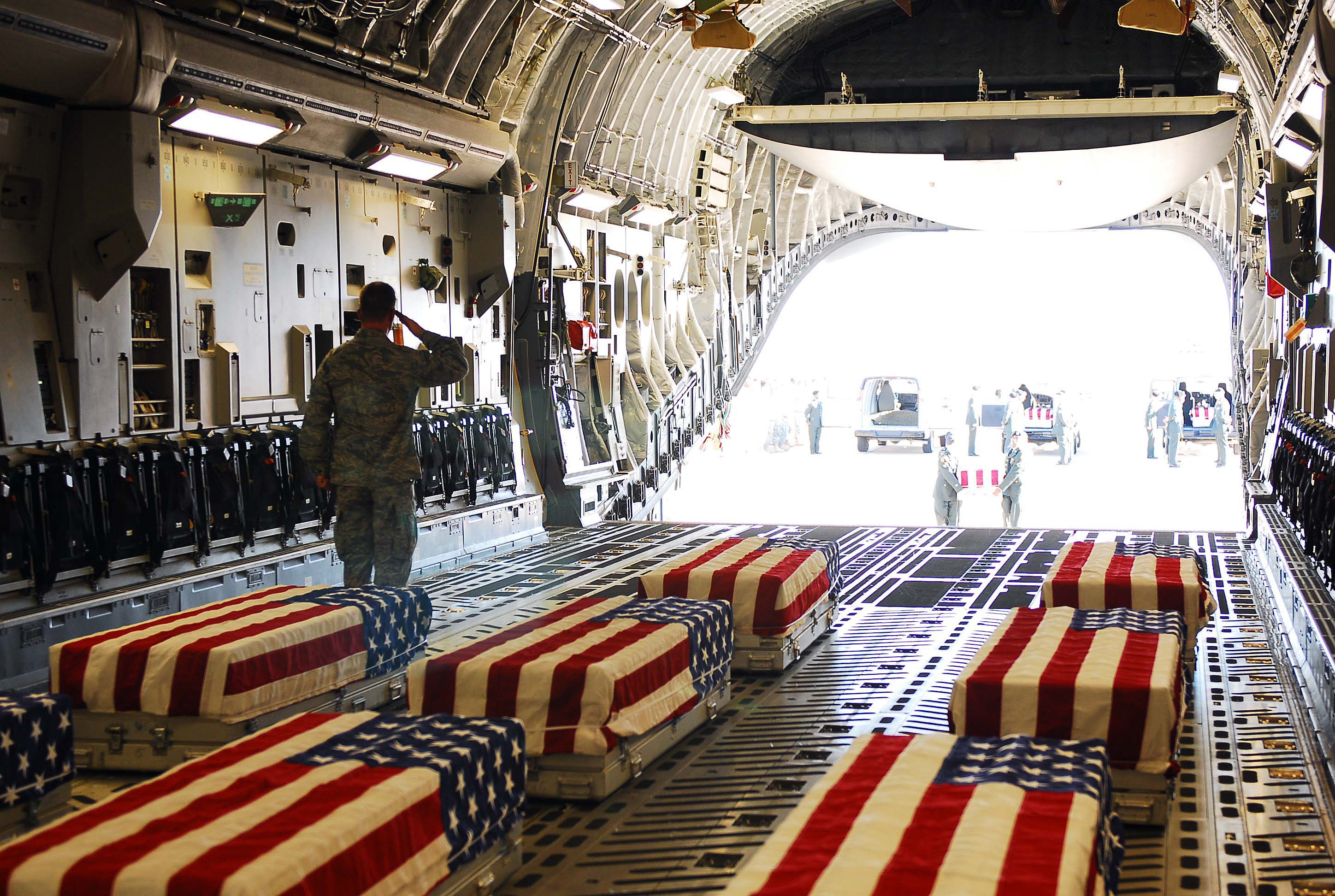
Coffins of soldiers killed in the 2009 Fort Hood shooting being loaded aboard an aircraft for flight to Dover Air Force Base, 6 November 2009.

Dates	Events
January	Al-Qaeda in Yemen/Islamic Jihad of Yemen and al-Qaeda in Saudi Arabia merged to form Al-Qaeda in the Arabian Peninsula (AQAP).
January 30	The Somalia War (2006–2009) ends after Ethiopian forces withdraw from Somalia.
January/February	The Somali Civil War (2009–present) begins.
February 28	The Battle of Bajaur ends: Pakistani forces killing 1,500 terrorists and wounding 2,000 more, whilst the Pakistanis lost 97 killed, 404 wounded and 5 captured, 176+ tribesmen were also killed.
April 16	The Insurgency in the North Caucasus begins.
April 26 – June 14	Operation Black Thunderstorm takes place: The Pakistani military captures a number of districts in Khyber-Pakhtunkhwa Province in Pakistan, from TTP and TNSM, killing 1,475 terrorists and capturing 114 more, whilst the Pakistani's lost over 150 killed, 95 captured (18 rescued) and 317 wounded.
Late April	The Leader of the Caucasus Emirate announced the revival of the Riyad-us Saliheen (having not display any activity for more than four years) as Riyad-us Saliheen Brigade of Martyrs that was led by Said Buryatsky.
May 16 – July 15	As part of the third phase of Operation Black Thunderstorm, the Second Battle of Swat takes place: Pakistani forces fought for control of Swat Valley in Pakistan, against TTP, TNSM and Lashkar-e-Islam (LeI) terrorists, eventually returning it to government control, killing 2,088 terrorists whilst the Pakistanis lost 168 killed, 454 wounded.
June 19 – December 12	Operation Rah-e-Nijat takes place: The aim of the operation by the Pakistani military was to regain control of South Waziristan in Pakistan, from the TTP, IMU, Jama'at al-Jihad al-Islami/IJU (an IMU splinter faction), al-Qaeda and other foreign jihadists terrorists, the operation was a success, ground forces killed 619 terrorists and captured 83 more, whilst losing approximately 200 killed and 600 wounded.
July 26	The Boko Haram insurgency begins.
August 5	A U.S. drone strike on a house in Zangara, Khyber Paktunkhwa, Pakistan, killed Baitullah Mehsud, the leader of the TTP.
August 6	Newly elected Obama administration has stopped using the phrase "war on terror"; John Brennan announces that the U.S. is "at war with al Qaeda", not involved in a "global war on terror" instead using the term OCO (Overseas Contingency Operations).
August 27	A US drone strike in South Waziristan, Pakistan, killed Tohir Yoʻldosh the leader of the IMU.
September 1 – November 30	The Khyber Pass offensive takes place: Pakistani forces launch an offensive to clear the LeI terrorists in and near the Khyber Pass in Khyber-Pakhtunkhwa Province, Pakistan.
September 17	Noordin Mohammed Top, the leader of al-Qaeda in the Malay Archipelago, was killed following a nine-hour siege of a house in Solo, Central Java, Indonesia, by Detachment 88 of the Indonesian National Police, four other suspected terrorists were killed.
October 1–7	Al-Shabaab terrorists with members of the Ras Kamboni Brigades, an Islamist insurgent group (due to ruptures within the group, one faction of the Brigade-led by Hassan Abdullah Hersi al-Turki-had begun to align itself with al-Shabaab) captured Kismayo in Somalia, following fighting with Hizbul-Islam militants that controlled the port.
October 10–11	Operation Janbaz by 10 TTP and Lashkar-e-Jhangvi (LeJ) terrorists killed 12 Pakistani servicemen and 2 civilians, 9 terrorists were killed and 1 captured.
November 5	The Fort Hood shooting in the United States kills 13 and injures 33.

== 2010 ==
Dates	Events
February 1	Al-Shabaab declares an alliance with al-Qaeda, aligning itself with the terrorists groups global militant campaign; the faction of the Ras Kamboni Brigades led by Hassan Abdullah Hersi al-Turki completely broke away from Hizbul Islam and officially joined al-Shabaab.
March 2	Said Buryatsky, the leader of the terrorist group Riyad-us-Saliheen Brigade of Martyrs, was killed during an FSB special forces raid in the village of Ekazhevo in Ingushetia, Russia. A total of 8 terrorists were killed and 10 more captured.
April 18	ISOF troops, supported by US troops, carried out a night-time raid on a terrorist safe house near Tikrit in Iraq, the ISOF surrounded the building and called on them to surrender, instead the terrorists fired on them, they returned fire and assaulted the building. The ISOF killed Abu Ayyub al-Masri and Abu Omar al-Baghdadi, the leaders of ISI, 16 others were also arrested. A US UH-60 Blackhawk helicopter supporting the mission crashed killing a US Army Ranger and wounding the aircrew.
August 23	The Battle of Mogadishu (2010–11) began in Somalia, as part of al-Shabaab's Ramadan offensive-attacking Somali TFG and AMISOM forces positions from the districts it controlled in the city and the surrounding area.
December 20–23	As a consequence of fighting with al-Shabaab weakening the group, Hizbul Islam's leader surrendered and the group merged into al-Shabaab.

== 2011 ==
Diagram of Osama bin Laden's hideout in Abbottabad, he was killed there on 2 May 2011.

Dates	Events
Unknown	AQAP created Ansar Al-Sharia (AAS (Yemen)) as a Yemen-based affiliate focused on waging an insurgency rather than international attacks on the West the International Crisis Group said that AQAP is "an internally diverse organization with varying layers of support among the local population" and many AAS members and allies are not committed to AQAP's international agenda.
January–March 31	Taking advantage of the Yemeni Revolution, AQAP terrorists and AAS (Yemen) takes over parts of Abyan Governorate (including Jaʿār) in Yemen, where on March 31 they reportedly declared the Governorate an "Al-Qaeda Emirate in Yemen" after seizing control of the region. The New York Times reported that those in control, while Islamic militants, are not in fact al-Qaeda.
February 23	Islamist militants begin an insurgency in the Sinai Peninsula.
May 2	Operation Neptune Spear takes place: Osama bin Laden and 4 other terrorists are killed in a raid by U.S. Navy SEALs of DEVGRU on his residence in Abbottabad, Pakistan.
May 22–23	The PNS Mehran attack took place: 15 al-Qaeda and TTP terrorists attacked PNS Mehran-the headquarters of the Pakistan Navy's Naval Air Arm, resulting in 18 Pakistani servicemen killed and 16 more wounded, the terrorists lost 4 killed, 5 wounded and 4 captured.
May 27 – September 10	The Battle of Zinjibar takes place: 300 AQAP and AAS (Yemen) terrorists attacked and captured Zinjibar in Abyan Governorate, Yemen, and later the surrounding area. Fighting continued with Yemeni forces and armedtribesman (supported by the US) attempts to liberate the city being repelled in June and July; the terrorist force later rose up 2,000 fighters, they were joined by 400 members of al-Shabaab, terrorists from the Aden-Abyan Islamic Army and other militants also took part in the fighting. Ultimately Government forces were not able to retake the city and the terrorists entrenched themselves in the city; between 374 and 386 terrorists and militants killed and further 128 wounded and 12 captured, whilst Yemeni forces lost 232 killed, over 330 soldiers wounded, 50 soldiers missing and 10 captured, 51 tribesmen were also killed.
June 3	A US drone strike in South Waziristan, Pakistan, kills Ilyas Kashmiri, a senior al-Qaeda terrorist and leader of Harkat-ul-Jihad al-Islami (HuJI) and Lashkar al-Zil, 8 other militants were also killed and 3 wounded.
July 20–21	Delta Force, supported by US Army Rangers, Afghan SOF elements and US military air assets, attacked a foreign fighter staging area in southeast Paktika Province, Afghanistan, that was facilitated by the Haqqani Network. An estimated 80 to 100 Haqqani and foreign fighters were killed as was a Delta Force operator.
August 6	The Battle of Mogadishu (2010–11) ends following a final, two-week offensive by Somali TFG and AMISOM forces which forced the al-Shabaab terrorists to withdraw from the capital to its strongholds in the central and southern part of Somalia; though small pockets remained until October 10.
October	The Movement for Oneness and Jihad in West Africa (MOJWA) broke with AQIM, with the alleged goal of spreading its ideology further into areas of West Africa that were not within the scope of AQIM. Some analysts believe that the split of the Black African-led MOJWA is a consequence of the Algerian predominance on AQIM's leadership.
October 16	Operation Linda Nchi began: After a series of cross-border raids (including kidnappings of mostly foreigners workers and tourists) by al-Shabaab terrorists, Kenyan forces invade Somalia to secure its borders and combat al-Shabaab in the country.
December 18	U.S. military forces withdraw from Iraq, ending the Iraq War.

== 2012 ==
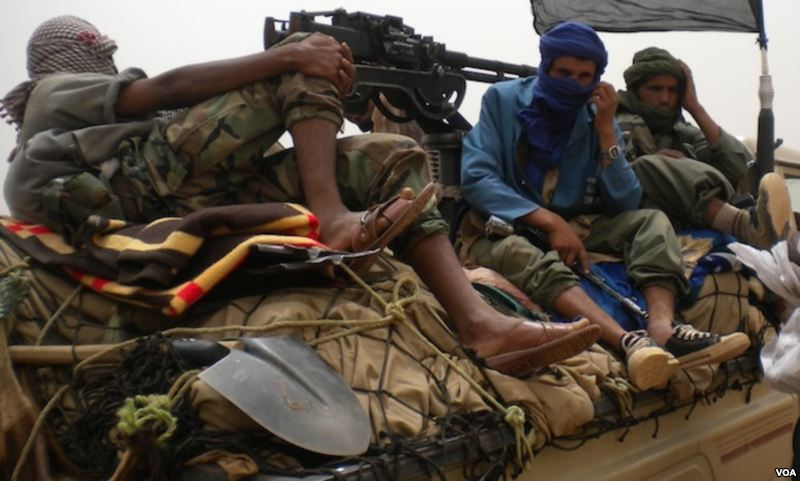
Ansar Dine terrorists during the offensive against the Mali government, 2012

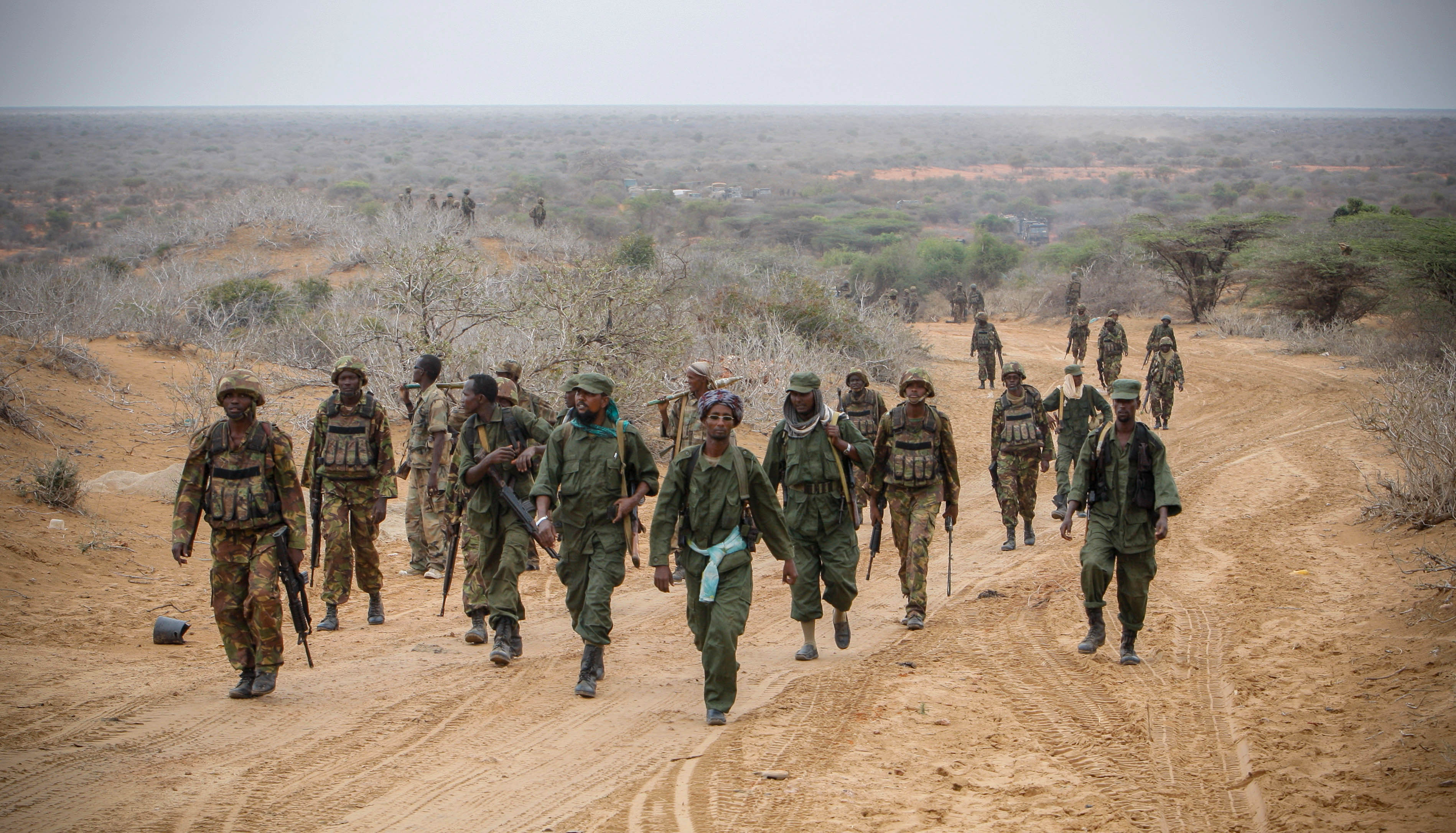
Kenyan troops of AMISOM and Somali militia of the Ras Kimboni Brigade, advancing on Kismayo in Somalia during the Second Battle of Kismayo, October 2012.

Dates	Events
January 16	The Northern Mali conflict begins when Islamic insurgents (affiliated with al-Qaeda) and a nationalist rebel group launch an offensive against the Mali government.
February 9	Al-Shabaab formally becomes part of al-Qaeda.
March 4–5	The Battle of Dofas takes place in Abyan Governorate in Yemen: AQAP and AAS (Yemen) terrorists successfully attacked Yemeni forces in the small town of Dofas on the outskirts of Zinjibar, destroying a Yemeni Army artillery battalion and capturing large quantities of weapons, including heavy ones, among them tanks. 42 terrorists and militants were killed, whilst Yemeni forces lost 187 killed, 135 wounded and 55–73 captured.
March 8	The Sokoto hostage rescue attempt takes place: Operators from the British Special Boat Service and Nigerian army soldiers attempted to rescue a British and Italian hostage in Sokoto, Nigeria, who were being held by members of Boko Haram who were backed by al-Qaeda, calling themselves "al-Qaida in the land beyond the Sahil". The rescue mission failed, both hostages were murdered by their captors, however 8 of them were killed and 2–3 arrested.
March 8 – July 6	Operation Linda Nchi ends after Kenyan forces in Somalia integrated into AMISOM (a process that was agreed in February with the UN Security Council Resolution 2036 which then began in March and was formally completed by July 6) having weakened al-Shabaab by killing at least 700 to at least roughly 920 terrorists and liberating most areas (including key areas) under their control; Kenyan Somali TFG and other forces in Somalia lost 21–72 killed, 152 injured.
April 29	A US drone strike in Miramshah, North Waziristan, Pakistan, killed Abu Usman Adil, the leader of the IMU, and 3 other terrorists.
May 12 – June 15	The 2012 Abyan offensive takes place: Yemeni forces successfully carry out a major offensive to retake the parts of Abyan Governorate under terrorist and militant occupation; by mid-June, government forces recapture Zinjibar, Jaʿār and other areas in mid-June, forcing the terrorists and militants to pull back to Azzan in Shabwah Governorate, whom abandoned it on June 17, forcing AQAP and other terrorists and militants return to an insurgency campaign in Abyan and neighboring provinces.
Summer	The terrorist group Katibat al-Muhajireen (Muhajireen Brigade) is established-it was later renamed Jaish al-Muhajireen wal-Ansar (JMA), with an oath of allegiance to the Caucasus Emirate, it was led by Abu Omar al-Shishani (alternatively called Tarkhan Batirashvili).
September 11	The Benghazi attack by Ansar al-Sharia in Libya (ASL) and other Islamist militants kills 4 and injures 7.
September 28 – October 1	The Second Battle of Kismayo took place in Somalia: AMISOM and Somali TFG forces, allegedly with the Raskamboni Movement, launched Operation Sledge Hammer, which forced al-Shabaab to withdraw from the port, the terrorists had been using the area as an operational and financial hub.
Unknown	Jund al-Aqsa (JAA) was formed as a sub-unit of the Al-Nusra Front.

== 2013 ==
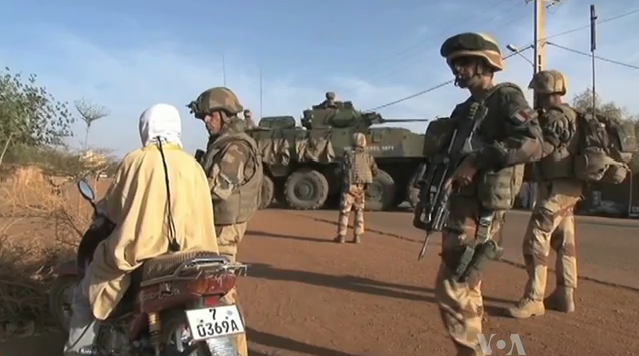
French soldiers on patrol in Gao, spring 2013.

JMA or an ISIL suicide bomber detonates a car bomb during the final assault on the Menagh Air Base. 5 August 2013.

Dates	Events
January 11	The Bulo Marer hostage rescue attempt takes place: Operators from the DGSE attempted to rescue 2 French hostages Bulo Marer, Somalia being held by al-Shabaab, the rescue mission failed, 2 DGSE operators were killed as was the hostage, 17 al-Shabaab terrorists were killed.
January 13	The French Military, supported by several African nations intervene in the Northern Mali Conflict, supporting Mali security forces against Movement for Oneness and Jihad in West Africa (MOJWA), Al-Qaeda in Islamic Maghreb (AQIM) and Ansar Dine.
January 16	The In Amenas hostage crisis in Algeria begins, ending on January 19, which kills 40 hostages. The terrorists responsible were affiliated with al-Mourabitoun.
April	ISI (Islamic State of Iraq) changes its name to Islamic State of Iraq and the Levant (ISIL) after expanding into Syria; throughout the month it made rapid military gains in northern Syria, in admits the Syrian Civil War.
May 11	The Reyhanlı bombings in Turkey kill 52 and injure 140.
August 4–19	2013 Latakia offensive takes place: Free Syrian Army rebels, fighting separately with al-Nusra Front, ISIL and JMA terrorists, along with militants from the Syrian Islamic Front's Ahrar al-Sham, jihadists from the Suqour al-Ezz and Harakat Sham al Islam (designated a terrorist group in September 2014), attempted an offensive to take over parts of Latakia Governorate in Syria from pro-Syrian government forces. The anti-government force initially seized over a dozen villages, but a counter offensive by pro-Syrian government forces retook most of the governorate. At least 107 rebels, militants, jihadists and terrorists were killed whilst 114 to 127 pro-Syrian government soldiers and 44 militiamen killed.
August 5/6	ISIL and JMA terrorists, along with militants from the Syrian Islamic Front's Ahrar al-Sham, militants from the Syrian Islamic Liberation Front's Al-Tawhid Brigade, and the Free Syrian Army's Northern Storm Brigade as well as 4 other groups seized the Syrian Pro-government held Menagh Military Airbase in Aleppo Governorate Syria, ending the year long siege of the airbase.
August 30	MOJWA and Al-Mulathameen merged to form Al-Mourabitoun.
September 21–24	The Westgate shopping mall attack in Nairobi, Kenya, carried out by al-Shabaab, kills 67 and injures 175.
November 1	A U.S. drone strike in the village of Dande Darpakhel in North Waziristan, Pakistan, killed Hakimullah Mehsud, the leader of the TTP.
late November-early December	Abu Omar al-Shishani, the leader of the JMA, swore his allegiance to Abu Bakr al-Baghdadi, the leader of the ISIL, causing the terrorist group to split, with hundreds of its members siding with Abu Omar al-Shishani and joining ISIL. Salahuddin al-Shishani was appointed the new commander of the JMA with the terrorists who were still loyal to the Caucasus Emirate.
December 30	ISIL and its allied insurgent groups and militias began what was known as the Anbar campaign to take over large parts of al Anbar Governorate in Iraq.

== 2014 ==
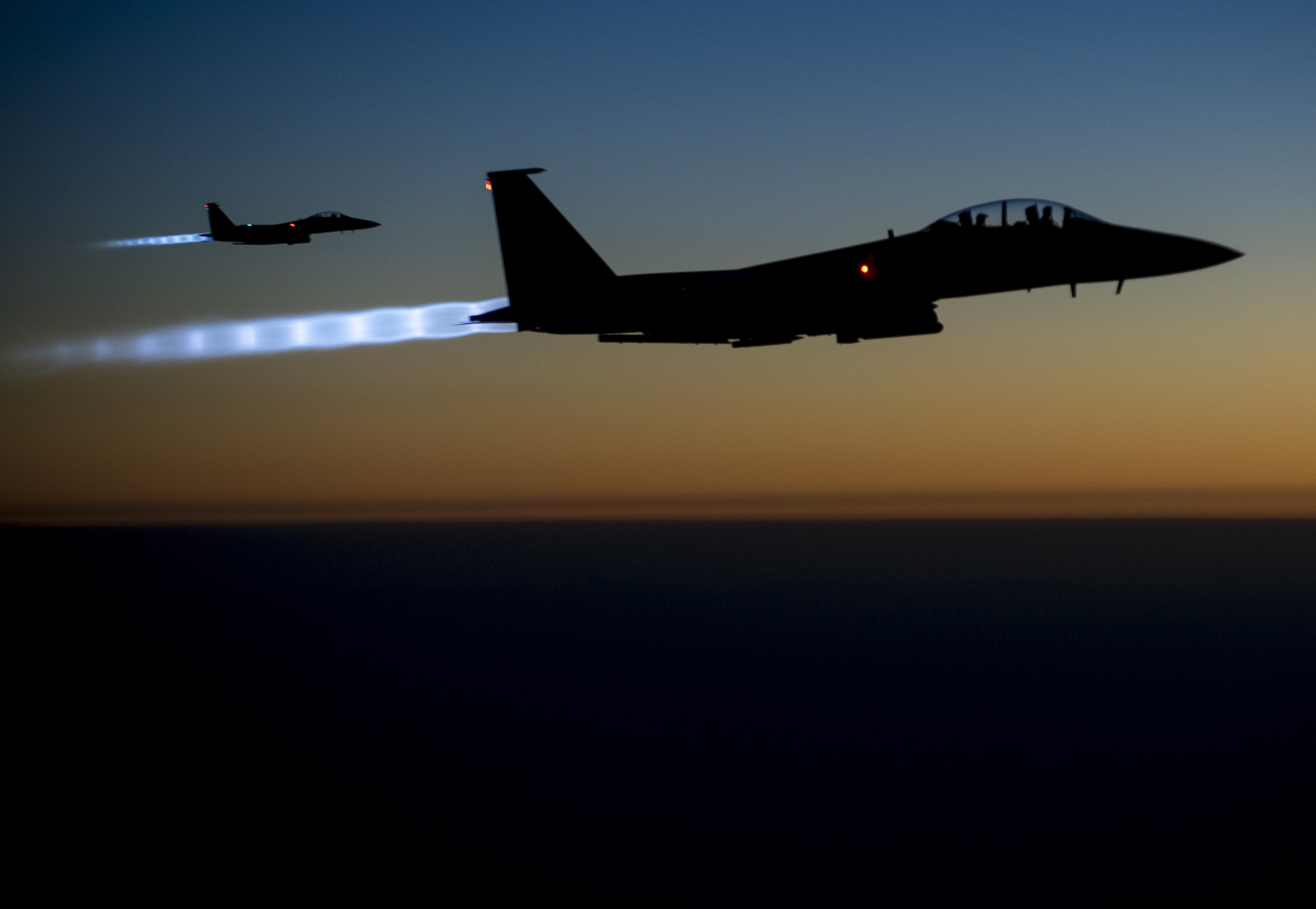
Two U.S. F-15E's flying over Iraq after conducting airstrikes in Syria, 23 September 2014.

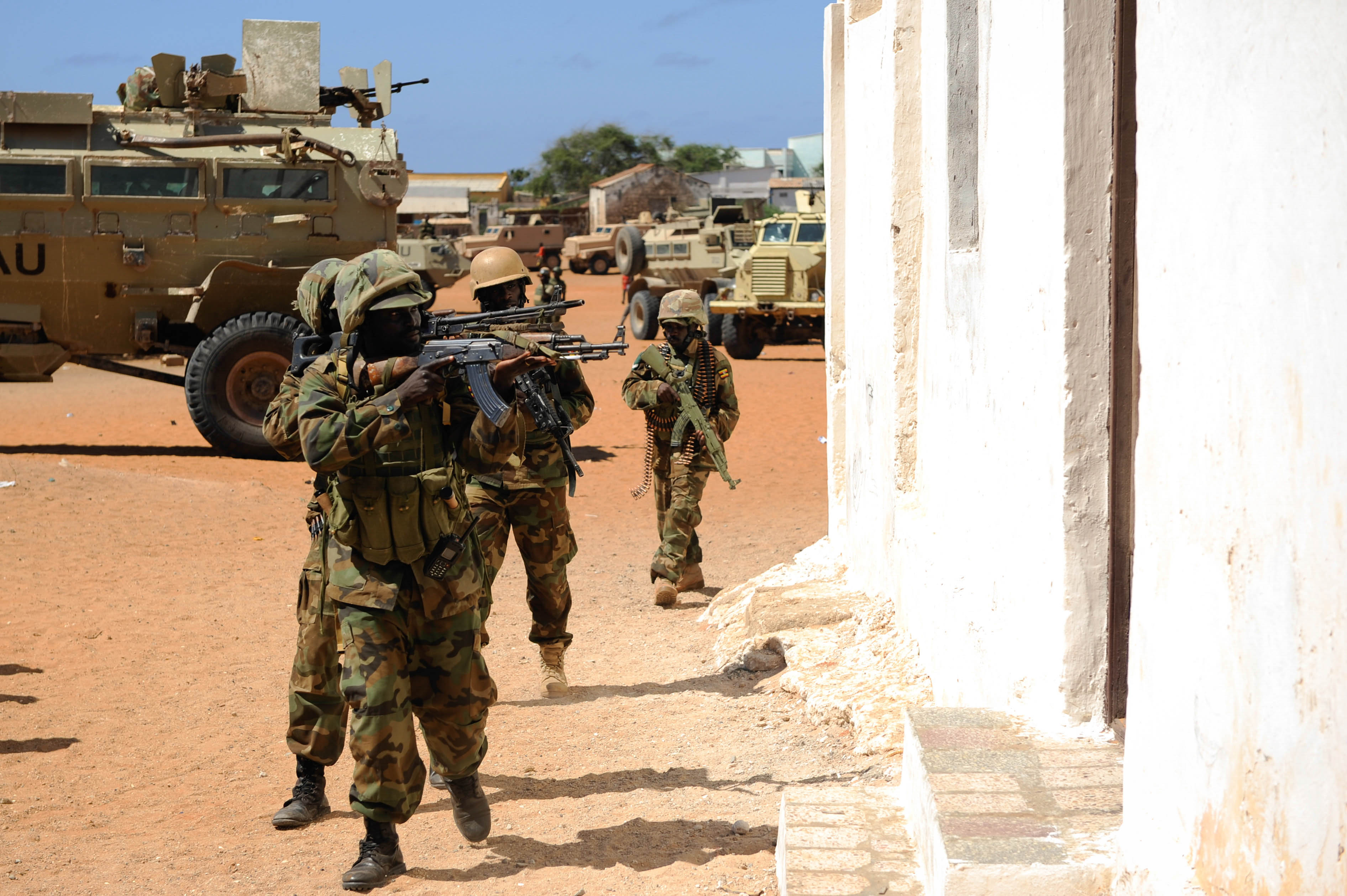
Ugandan special forces members clearing buildings in Barawe in Somalia as part of Operation Indian Ocean, 6 October 2014.

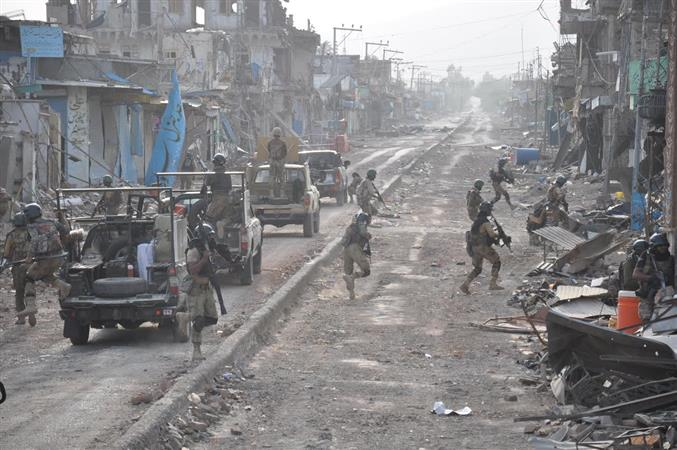
Pakistani forces clear the village of Mirali in North Waziristan, Pakistan, as part of Operation Zarb-e-Azb

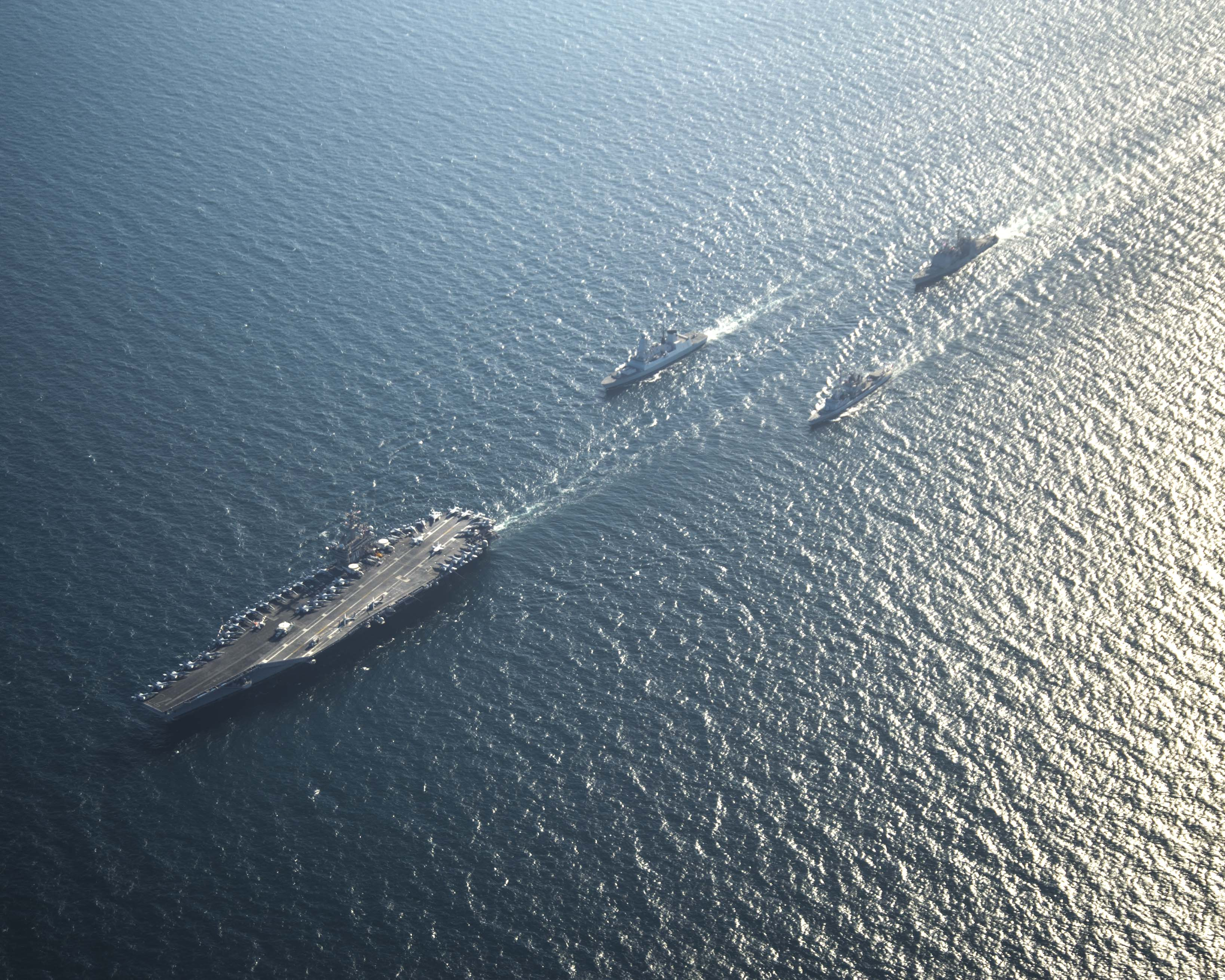
The USS Carl Vinson, escorted by HMS Defender, USS Bunker Hill and FS Jean Bart in the Persian Gulf for strike operations in Iraq and Syria. 10 November 2014.

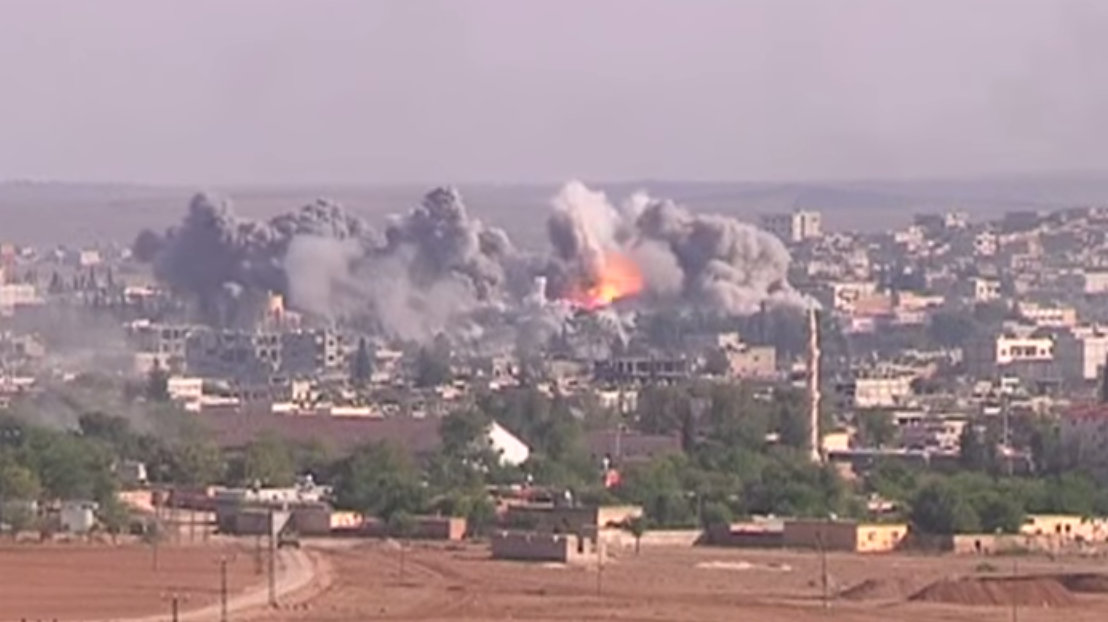
Coalition Airstrikes on ISIL positions in Kobanî in Syria, during the battle for the city, 19 November 2014.

Dates	Events
January	The Suqour al-Ezz group joined al-Nusra Front.
February	Al-Qaeda formally dissociated itself and broke off links with its former affiliate ISIL, leaving the al-Nusra Front the main representative of al-Qaeda in Syria.
February or March-before August	AMISOM and the Somali Armed Forces carry out Operation Eagle in South Central Somalia: the offensive resulted in 11 significant towns being liberated in the regions of Bay, Bakool, Gedo, Lower Shebelle, Middle Shebelle, Galguduud and Hiran.
Mid-March	The Shabwah Governorate offensive (2014–present) by AQAP terrorists to take control of Shabwah Governorate in Yemen begins.
March 21 – June 15	The Latakia offensive (2014) takes place in Latakia Governorate, Syria: al-Nusra Front, JMA and Harakat Sham al-Islam terrorists, along with militants from the Islamic Front (Syria)'s Ahrar al-Sham and Ansar al-Sham (with the alleged backing of Turkey) launched the offensive with the aim of taking over of all strategic observatories, government villages and the Mediterranean coast and/or force the Syrian army to redeploy forces to Latakia Governorate, which would relieve pressure on other rebels elsewhere in Syria. The terrorists and militants seized Kessab and other strategic areas which pro-government Syrian forces and other allied militias diverted to Latakia from Idlib, Hama Governorate and the Battle of Aleppo to launch a counteroffensive. With the support of Hezbollah terrorists, Iraqi Shia militia, Iranian military advisers, pro-Government forces eventually recaptured all territory previously lost to the terrorists and militants and stall any further advances. Between 582 and 2,700 Terrorists, militants and rebels were killed as well as 5,635 wounded, Ibrahim Bin Shakaran, the leader of Harakat Sham al-Islam, was killed during the offensive; between 50 and 571 pro-Government forces were killed. US-backed Free Syrian Army rebels, with Turkish military support, were reportedly involved in the offensive.
April 10 – July 14	Taking advantage of the Deir ez-Zor clashes (2011–2014) between Syrian forces loyal to Bashar al-Assad and the Free Syrian Army (SNC-aligned units) in Deir ez-Zor Governorate in Syria; ISIL terrorists launched the Deir ez-Zor offensive (April–July 2014) which by 14 July defeated the Free Syrian Army and other rebel units, as well as al-Nusra; and captured almost the whole province, except a part of the provincial capital, the military airport on its southern outskirts and a few of the surrounding towns, which were garrisoned by pro-Assad forces. At least 267 ISIL terrorists were killed as were 414 rebels and terrorists were killed, the end of the offensive marked the beginning of the Siege of Deir ez-Zor (2014–17).
June 3	Operation Enduring Freedom – Kyrgyzstan ends.
June 4–29	ISIL terrorists, Iraqi Ba'ath Party loyalists and other militants carried out their Northern Iraq offensive, capturing most of Saladin and Nineveh Governorate (including Capturing Mosul) and parts of Kirkuk Governorate, and Diyala Governorate, Iraqi government and Kurdish counterattacks managed to regain some of the territory lost. Iraqi government and Kurdish forces lost over 800 killed, 1,900 missing (1,566 executed in the Camp Speicher massacre) and 90,000 deserted whilst ISIL and anti-government militants lost over 711 militants and terrorists. By June 23, ISIL and its allied militants taking part in their Anbar campaign captured of at least 70% of Al Anbar Governorate, suffering 2,055 killed and 528 captured, whilst Iraqi government forces lost between 300 and 6,000 killed and 12,000 deserted; they were halted by Iraqi security forces on June 25 before they reached the Haditha Dam. On June 29, ISIL proclaimed itself and its territory as a caliphate with Abu Bakr al-Baghdadi named as its caliph and the terrorist group formally called itself Islamic State. By this time, ISIL had largely defeated its rivals and former allies, with many who had not been killed or driven away pledging allegiance to the terrorist group.
June 13	International campaign against ISIL begins with the American-led intervention in Iraq against ISIL.
June 15	The Pakistani military began Operation Zarb-e-Azb: A military offensive to "flush out" all foreign and local militants hiding in North Waziristan in Pakistan, including the TTP, IMU, ETIM, LeJ, al-Qaeda, Jundallah and the Haqqani network.
June 30	The First Battle of Tikrit ends after ISIL terrorists, Ba'athists and Sunni militants (that soon become part of the group), seized the city in Saladin Governorate, Iraq, from Iraqi government forces' control, whom were supported by the US forces, the battle had begun on June 26 as part of Salahuddin campaign (that had begun on 5 June as part of ISIS' Northern Iraq offensive). Between 25 and over 215 terrorists and militants were killed, over 35 Iraqi government forces were killed.
July 4	Operators from Delta force attempted to rescue two dozen hostages who was being held by ISIL in Syria, but it was discovered that the hostages had been moved 24 hours before, at least 5 ISIL terrorists were killed during the mission.
July 15	Operation Serval: the French and African intervention in the Northern Mali conflict ends, the operation killed Between 600 and 1,000 terrorists and captured 109–300 more.
July 23 – August 28	ISIL carries out its Eastern Syria offensive, the terrorists took over all of Raqqa Governorate following the conclusion of the Battle of Al-Tabqa airbase-the last pro-Syrian government stronghold in the Governorate. Pro-Syrian government forces and Rojava's YPG managed to stop ISIL from taking over most of Al-Hasakah Governorate, and gaining anymore territory in Aleppo Governorate. Between 456 and over 586 ISIL terrorists were killed, pro-Syrian Government forces and the YPG lost at least 549 killed, 32 missing and 10 captured.
July 23	ASG leader, Isnilon Hapilon, swore the groups allegiance to ISIL.
July 25	The JMA and the terrorist/jihadist groups Harakat Sham al-Islam, Harakat Fajr ash-Sham al-Islamiya and the Green Battalion formed an alliance called Ansar al-Din Front.
August 1	Operation Barkhane began: French and African forces began anti-insurgent operation in Africa's Sahel region, particularly against al-Mourabitoun, AQIM and Ansar Dine.
August 1–19	ISIL carries out another offensive in northern Iraq, capturing Zummar Sinjar and the Mosul Dam, however Kurdish and Iraqi government, supported by US, UK and Australian forces, break ISIL's siege of Mount Sinjar and evacuate the majority of 50,000 Yazidis trapped on Mount Sinjar by August 13. Iraqi government forces and Kurdish forces supported by US military assets retook the dam after 4 days of fighting. At least 100 ISIL terrorists were killed and a further 160 wounded and 38 captured.
August 8 – October 17	The Galgala campaign takes place: The Puntland Dervish Force and the Puntland Intelligence Agency launched the campaign to re-gain control of the Galgala hills in the Galgala area of Puntland in Somalia from al-Shabaab control, the terrorists were reportedly aided by soldiers from the self-declared state of Somaliland. The final al-Shabaab stronghold fell on October 17, bringing the campaign to a successful conclusion and al-Shabaab went back to being a low-level insurgency in area; at least 96 terrorists and Somaliland soldiers were killed, Puntland lost at least 18 killed and 40 wounded.
August 25 or 29 – October 31	Operation Indian Ocean takes place: AMISOM and the Somali Armed Forces removed al-Shabaab from its remaining coastal strongholds in South Central Somalia; there were at least 8 in total, which included Barawe (which was a significant loss for the terrorist group, whom had used the port as its main safe haven and was an important source of revenue), Bulo Marer and Adale. The operation was also aimed at clearing any remaining terrorists from the countryside, the force liberated Jalalaqsi-the last al-Shabaab stronghold in the Hiran region. The force captured at least 700 al-Shabaab terrorists.
August 31	The Siege of Amirli ended in Saladin Governorate, Iraqi government and militias, the Kurdish peshmerga and Iranian forces, supported by the coalition, broke ISIL' siege of the town that had begun on June 11 as part of the Salahuddin campaign. At least 147 ISIS terrorists and Ba'athist militants were killed and 15 captured, whilst the combined force lost at least 16 killed and 39 wounded.
September 1	A U.S. drone strike in southern Somalia killed Ahmed Abdi Godane, the leader of al-Shabaab, along with 6 other terrorists.
September 15	The Siege of Kobanî begins: ISIL began a massive offensive to capture the Kobanî Canton, (particularly the city of Kobanî) in Aleppo Governorate, Syria. By October, ISIL had taken most of the Canton and the city.
September 22	The international campaign against ISIL continues with the American-led intervention in Syria.
Early October	As part of the Ansar al-Din Front, the Green Battalion merges with the JMA.
October	Pakistani military began Operation Khyber against terrorists and Islamist insurgents in the Khyber Agency of Pakistan, the operation of four phases.
October 29 – December 21	The Second Battle of Baiji takes place as part of the Salahuddin campaign: After the Fall of Baiji in Saladin Governorate to ISIL during their Northern Iraq offensive in June, Iraqi forces, Hezbollah terrorists, Iranian forces, supported by the coalition, retook the city and broke the siege at the oil refinery in November, but ISIL launched a counterattack in December and recaptured the city and re-established a siege of the oil refinery. Over 100 terrorists were killed; and over 500 of the combined force were killed.
November 10–13	Members of Ansar Bait al-Maqdis (ABM) began swearing an oath of allegiance to Abu Bakr al-Baghdadi, thus merging with ISIL and becoming the Islamic State of Iraq and the Levant – Sinai Province (ISIL-SP).
November 13	ISIL announced that Islamic State of Iraq and the Levant – Yemen Province (ISIL-YP) had been established in Yemen.
November 21	The Battle of Ramadi (2014–15) begins: ISIL terrorists attacked the city, which was one of the Iraqi government's last strongholds in Al Anbar Governorate, Iraq.
November 26 – December 6	U.S. Navy SEALs and Yemen special forces soldiers carried out missions to rescue hostages being held by AQAP in Yemen: On the first raid in Hadhramaut Governorate – 8 hostages were rescued and 7 AQAP terrorists were killed. On the second raid in Shabwah Governorate: a firefight ensued 6 AQAP terrorists were killed, 2 hostages were mortally wounded and later died.
December 16	TTP terrorists carried out the Peshawar school massacre in Pakistan, which killed 149 and injured 114 people.
December 23	The Third Battle of Baiji begins: As part of the Salahuddin campaign, Iraqi and Iranian forces, with Shia militia, supported by the coalition, begin the battle to retake the city after the ISIL counterattack that seized the city 2 days before.
December 28	NATO officially ended combat operations in Afghanistan ending the War in Afghanistan (2001–present) phase of the war.
December 28–30	The Dhuluiya offensive by Iraqi government forces and Shia militia, as well as local Sunni tribesman liberated Dhuluiya in Saladin Governorate, Iraq, from ISIL and broke their siege of the Juburi tribe in the southern part of the town, as part of the Salahuddin campaign. The combined force lost 73 killed whilst terrorists lost 300 killed.

== 2015 ==
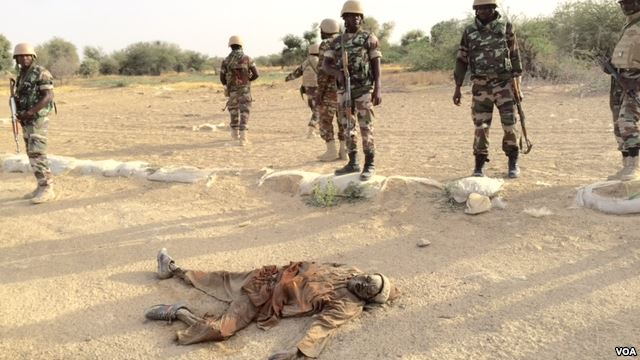
Niger soldiers with a dead Boko Haram/ISWAP terrorist near Diffa in Niger, 27 March 2015.

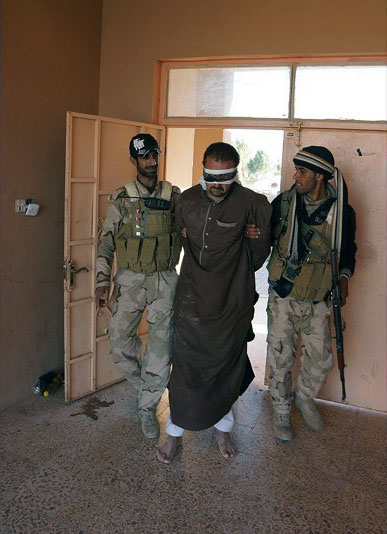
Iraqi troops or Popular Mobilization Forces militiaman with a captured ISIL terrorist in Salahuddin campaign in Iraq, 6 April 2015.

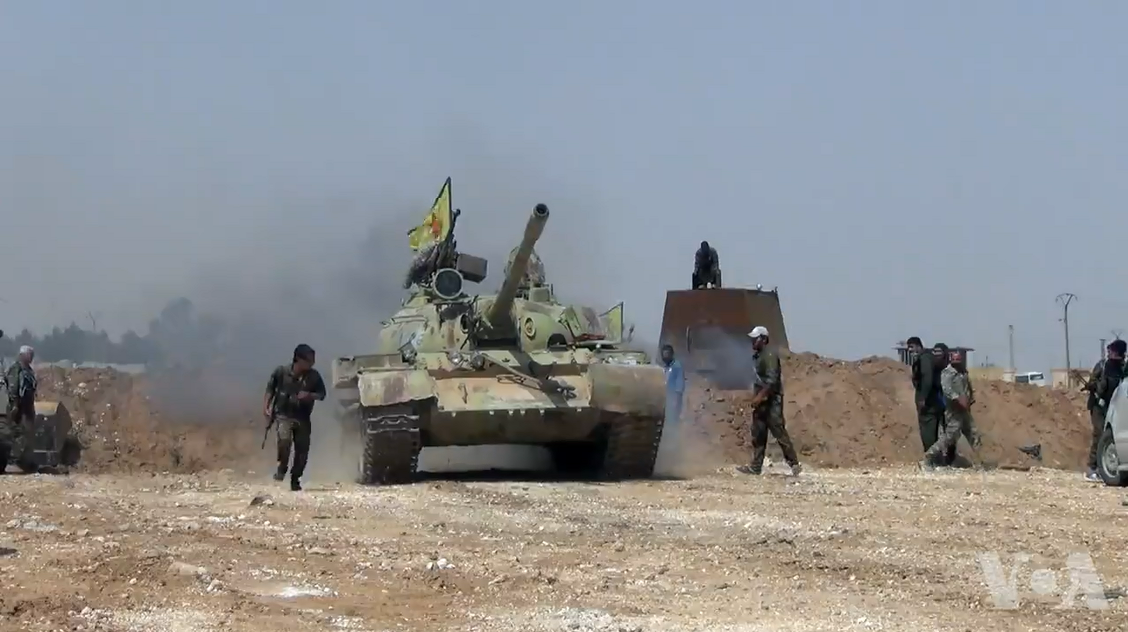
A YPG T-55 in Tell Tamer during the Western al-Hasakah offensive in Syria, 22 May 2015.

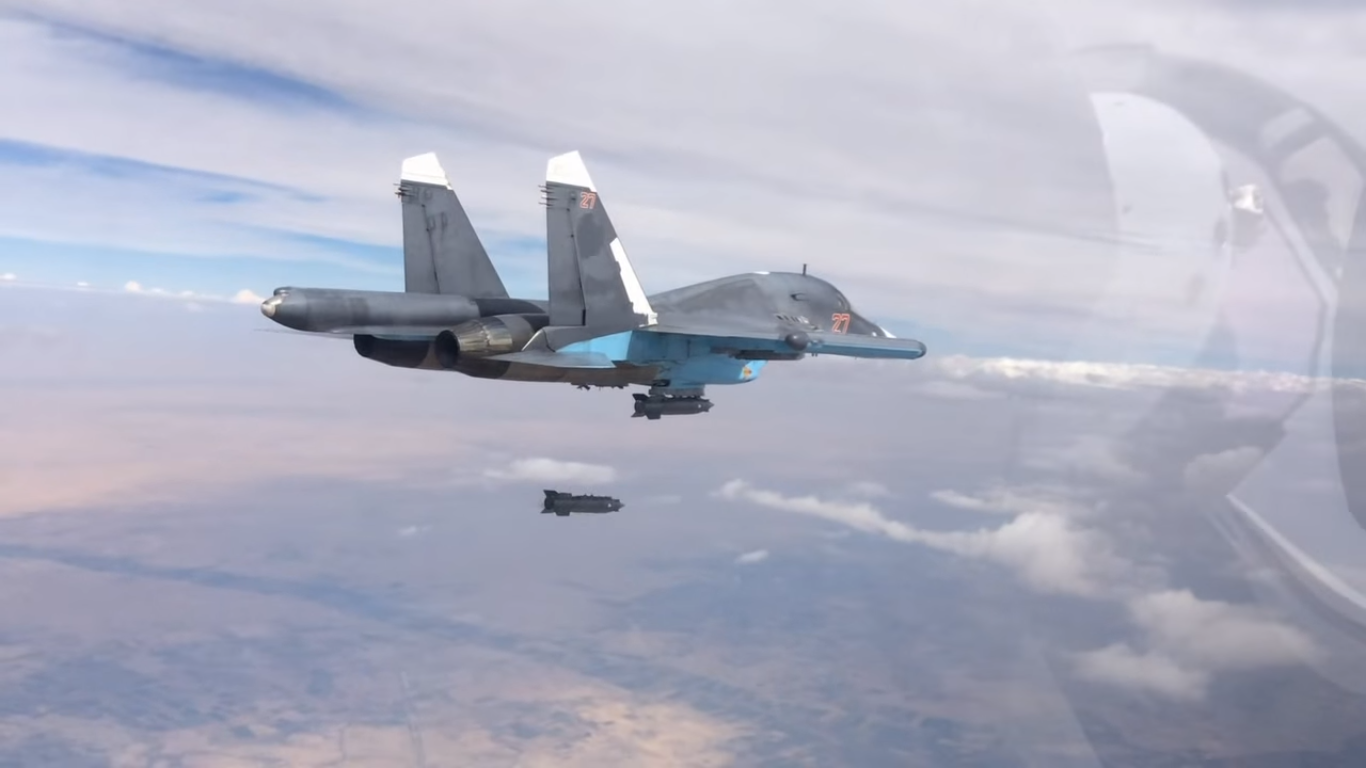
A Russian Su-34 dropping bombs on targets in Syria, 9 October 2015.

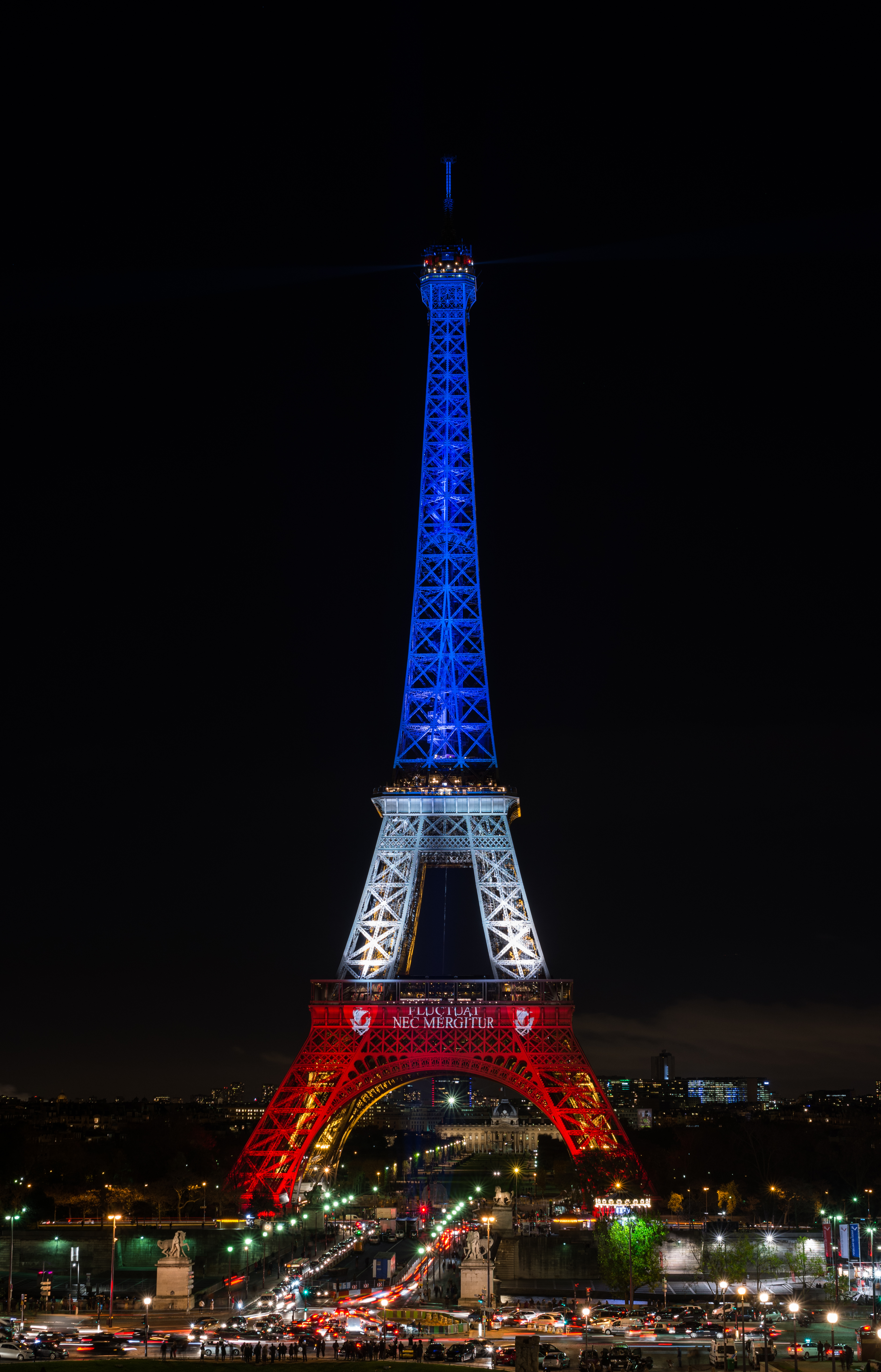
The Eiffel Tower in Paris lit in blue white red in the aftermath of the November 2015 Paris attacks, 21 November 2015.

Dates	Events
January 1	The Post ISAF phase of the War in Afghanistan begins with NATO's Resolute Support Mission.
January 7–9	The January 2015 Île-de-France attacks in France kill a total of 17 and injures 22 people, the perpetrators were terrorists affiliated with AQAP and ISIL.
late January–December 24	The West African offensive began: military and security personnel from 4 west African nations belonging to Multinational Joint Task Force launched an offensive against Boko Haram (known as Wilayat Gharb Afriqiya from March 2015) terrorists occupying northeast Nigeria, northern Cameroon, southeast Niger and western Chad. The offensive was a success and the terrorists retreated into the Sambisa Forest, on December 24, the President of Nigeria, claimed that Boko Haram was "technically defeated."
January 26	ISIL official spokesman at the time, Abu Muhammad al-Adnani, released an audio statement in which he accepted an earlier pledge of allegiance by ISIL representatives and local terrorists in Pakistan and announced the expansion of ISIL's caliphate with the creation of Islamic State of Iraq and the Levant – Khorasan Province (ISIL-KP).
January 27	The Corinthia Hotel attack in Tripoli, Libya, was conducted by ISIL kills 10 people.
February 14	The Copenhagen shootings in Denmark, kills 3 and injures 5.
February 16	Following the kidnapping and beheading of Copts in Libya and in support of the International campaign against ISIL, the Egyptian military attacked ISIS positions in Libya in amidst the Second Libyan Civil War. Killing 81 terrorists.
February 21 – March 17	The Eastern al-Hasakah offensive takes place: Rojavan militias (predominantly YPG and YPJ), Assyrian and Arab militias, supported by the coalition, launched the offensive to liberate Jazira Canton region in Al-Hasakah Governorate, Syria, from ISIL-occupation. By March 10, the combined force had liberated the Jazira Canton, and spent the next few days repelling ISIL counterattacks before advancing again; previously on March 6 Pro-Syrian government forces fighting separately to the Kurds, Assyrians, Arabs and the coalition, launched their own offensive, capturing over 30 villages in the region. 155 YPG and allies were killed and 13 captured; between 387 and 423 terrorists were killed.
February 24	The Joint Special Operations Task Force-Philippines was deactivated in the Philippines, ending Operation Enduring Freedom – Philippines.
March 7	Boko Haram's leader, Abubakar Shekau, pledged his terrorist groups allegiance to ISIL, it was accepted and Abu Mohammad al-Adnani described it as an expansion of the group's caliphate to West Africa, the group now became known as Wilayat Gharb Afriqiya/ISWAP.
March 15	The Siege of Kobanî in Syria ends following a counter offensive by Rojava militia, Free Syrian Army rebels, PKK terrorists, and other allied militias, with the support of the coalition that began in January, retook almost all of Kobanî and the Kobanî Canton. The YPG and YPJ militias lost between 562 and 741 killed, the rebels lost between 29 and 72 killed; Between over 1,000 to 5,000 terrorists were killed.
March 18	The Bardo National Museum attack in Tunisia kills 23 and injures about 50, the attack was carried out by either ISIL or AQIM terrorists
March 19	The Al-Qaeda insurgency in Yemen escalates into the Yemeni Civil War.
March 20	ISIL carried out the Sana'a mosque bombings in Yemen which killed 142 and injured 351.
March 26 – August 11	The 2nd Abyan campaign between the Houthis rebels and pro-Hadi forces for the control of the Abyan Governorate in Yemen. During the offensive, AQAP terrorists pledged to fight alongside pro-Hadi forces against the Houthis but clarified they were not loyal to Hadi; the Pro-Hadi Forces secured the Governorate on 11 August.
April 2–16	AQAP terrorists (using the name the 'Sons of Hadhramaut' in an attempt emphasize its ties to the surrounding province) seized the city of Mukalla and the surrounding area in Hadhramaut Governorate, Yemen, with minimal resistance. After seizing government buildings, releasing jihadists from prison and stealing millions of dollars from the central bank; they passed control to a civilian council and gave it a budget to run the city in an attempt to build local support and reduce the threat of foreign military action.
April 19	The leader of the Caucasus Emirate, Aliaskhab Kebekov, was killed by Russian FSB special forces during a raid on a terrorist-occupied house in Buynaksk in Dagestan, Russia, 4 other terrorists were killed.
May 3	The Curtis Culwell Center attack in the United States injures 1, ISIL claims responsibility.
May 6–31	The Western al-Hasakah offensive takes place in al-Hasakah Governorate, Syria: militia from Rojava, Assyrian and Kurdish militias, supported by the coalition, liberated key towns in western al-Hasakah Governorate along with 230 towns, villages, farms, and the Abd al-Aziz Mountains from ISIL-occupation. 55 Kurds, Assyrians and Arabs were killed, between 268 and 716 terrorists were killed.
May 17	The Battle of Ramadi (2014–15) in Al Anbar Governorate ends after Iraqi forces retreated from the city during an ISIL attack-despite coalition support, ISIL seized the city. Over 160 Iraqi government forces were killed and a further 25 missing; at least 68 terrorists were killed.
May 31 – July 10	Following the success of the Western al-Hasakah offensive in Syria, Rojavan militia and Free Syrian Army rebels, supported by the coalition, launch the Tell Abyad offensive in the northern Raqqa Governorate against ISIL, successfully liberating the key towns of Tell Abyad, Suluk, Ayn Issa and over 30 villages from them, linking the Kurdish-controlled areas Kobani Canton with the Jazira Canton. At least 46 militia and rebels were killed, between 338 and 599 ISIL were killed.
June 12	A U.S. drone strike in Hadhramaut Governorate in Yemen killed Nasir al-Wuhayshi, the leader of AQAP.
June	The leader of the Riyad-us Saliheen Brigade of Martyrs, Aslan Byutukayev, released an audio message, pledging allegiance to Abu Bakr al-Baghdadi.
June 23	ISIL official spokesman at the time, Abu Muhammad al-Adnani, accepted previous pledges of mid-level and later senior Caucasus Emirate commanders to Abu Bakr al-Baghdadi, and announced the creation of Islamic State of Iraq and the Levant – Caucasus Province (ISIL-CP).
June 26	The 2015 Ramadan attacks, carried out by ISIL and al-Shabaab killed over 403 and injured over 336.
July 13	The Anbar campaign (2015–2016) in begins: Iraqi and Iranian forces, supported by the coalition launched the offensive to recapture areas of Al Anbar Governorate in Iraq under ISIL occupation.
August 11	The leader of the Caucasus Emirate, Magomed Suleimanov, was killed by Russian security forces during a counterterrorism raid in Untsukulsky District in Dagestan, Russia, 3 other terrorists were killed.
September 23	The JMA left the Ansar al-Din Front and joined al-Nusra.
October 6	The Aden unrest begins after pro-Hadi forces, supported by the Saudi Arabian-led coalition, retook the city of Aden from the Houthis rebels in July, both AQAP and ISIL-YP increased their presence in the city in what Frank Gardner said was "a base they could only have dreamed of before this war began."
October 7–11	In Shorabak District, Kandahar province, Afghanistan, 200 U.S. and Afghan Special forces operators supported by 63 U.S. airstrikes destroyed 'probably the largest ever' al-Qaeda in the Indian Subcontinent (AQIS) training camp, killing Some 160 al-Qaeda terrorists.
October 14	U.S. military personnel were deployed to Cameroon to support African forces in a non-combat role in their fight against ISIL.
October 22	The Third Battle of Baiji ends in a victory for the combined forces', after repeated attacks and counterattacks throughout the year, the combined force finally liberated the city in Saladin Governorate in Iraq from ISIL, as part of the Salahuddin campaign. Over at least 1,000 terrorists were killed and the Iraqi Army lost over 2,500 killed and many hundreds wounded.
October 22	Abdul Qadir Mumin, the leader of a group of terrorists loyal al-Shabaab in Puntland, Somalia, pledged allegiance to ISIL-which meant the establishment of Islamic State in Somalia (ISS).
November 12	ISIL carried out the 2015 Beirut bombings in Lebanon, killing 43 and injuring at least 240
November 13	Two U.S. F-15E fighter jets carried out an airstrike in Derna, Libya, targeting and killing Abu Nabil al-Anbari, the leader of ISIL in Libya.
November 13/14	The November 2015 Paris attacks in France, carried out by ISIL, killed at least 139 and injured 352 people.
November 20	AQIM and al-Mourabitoun terrorists carry out the Bamako hotel attack in Mali killing at least 27 and injuring 2.
November 25	The Battle of Ramadi (2015–16) began: As part of the Anbar campaign (2015–16), Iraqi forces, supported by the coalition, began the offensive to liberate the city in Al Anbar Governorate, Iraq, from ISIL occupation.
December 2–3	AQAP and AAS (Yemen) seizes Zinjibar and Jaʿār in Abyan Governorate, Yemen, after exploiting the collapse of the central government, a dozen terrorists and militants were killed and a dozen pro-Hadi troops were killed.
December 16–17	ISIL launched the Nineveh Plains offensive against Peshmerga-held areas north and east of Mosul, among the Peshmerga were Canadian and Turkish troops, whom with the Peshmerga were supported by the coalition; the offensive was beaten back, over 250 ISIL terrorists were killed, at least 6 Peshmerga fighters were killed and 4 Turkish soldiers were killed.

== 2016 ==
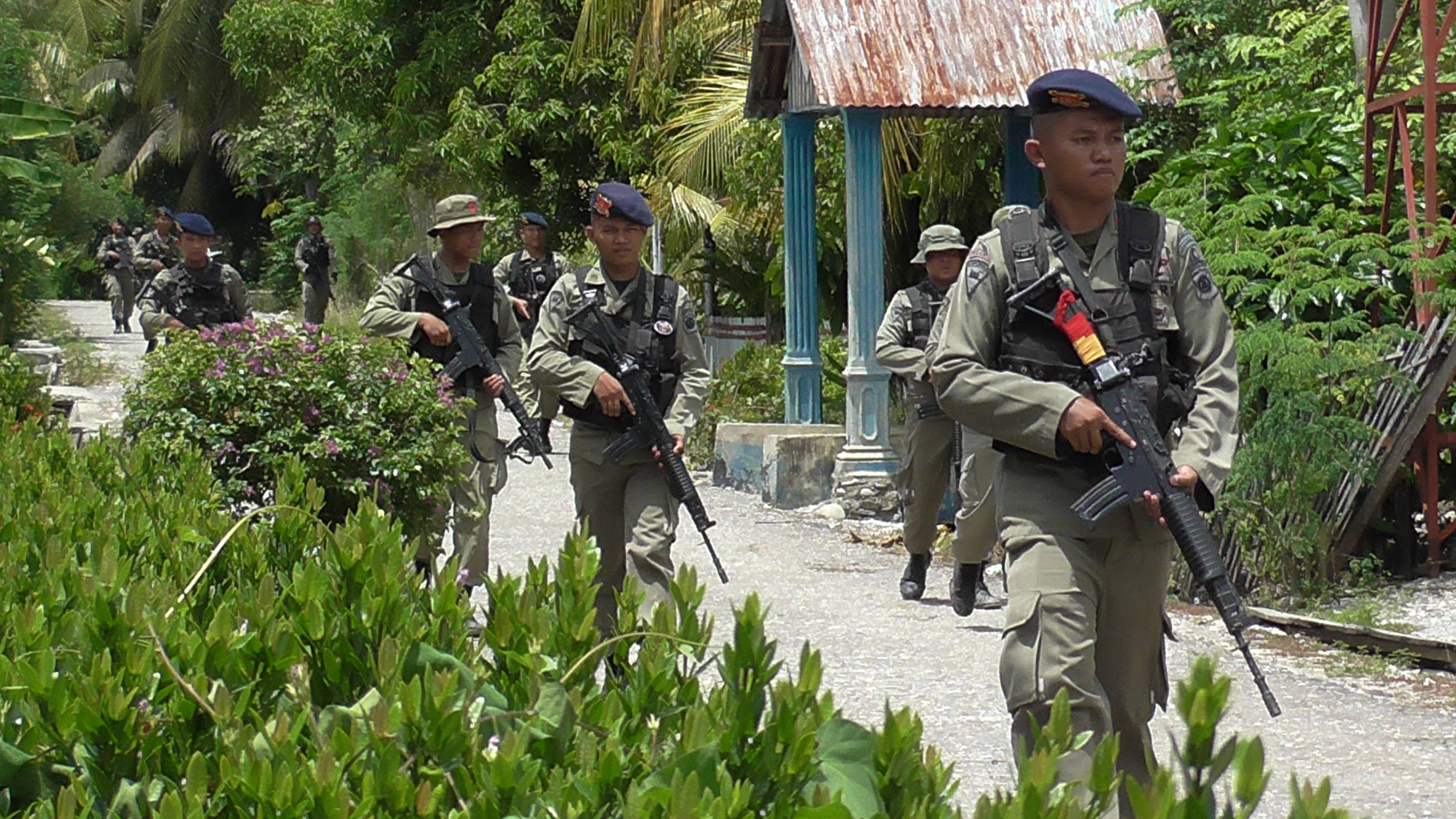
Members of the Mobile Brigade Corps during Operation Tinombala in Indonesia. 8 April 2016

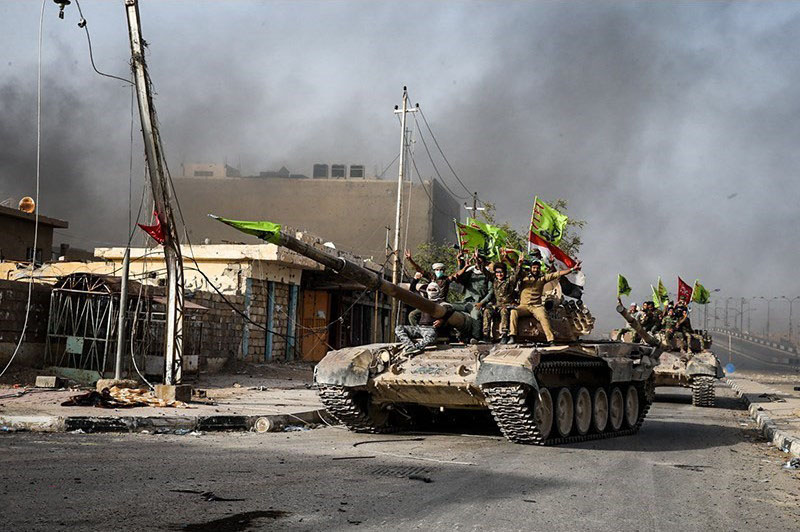
Popular Mobilization Forces militiaman in Fallujah after defeating ISIL in the battle for the city, 28 June 2016.

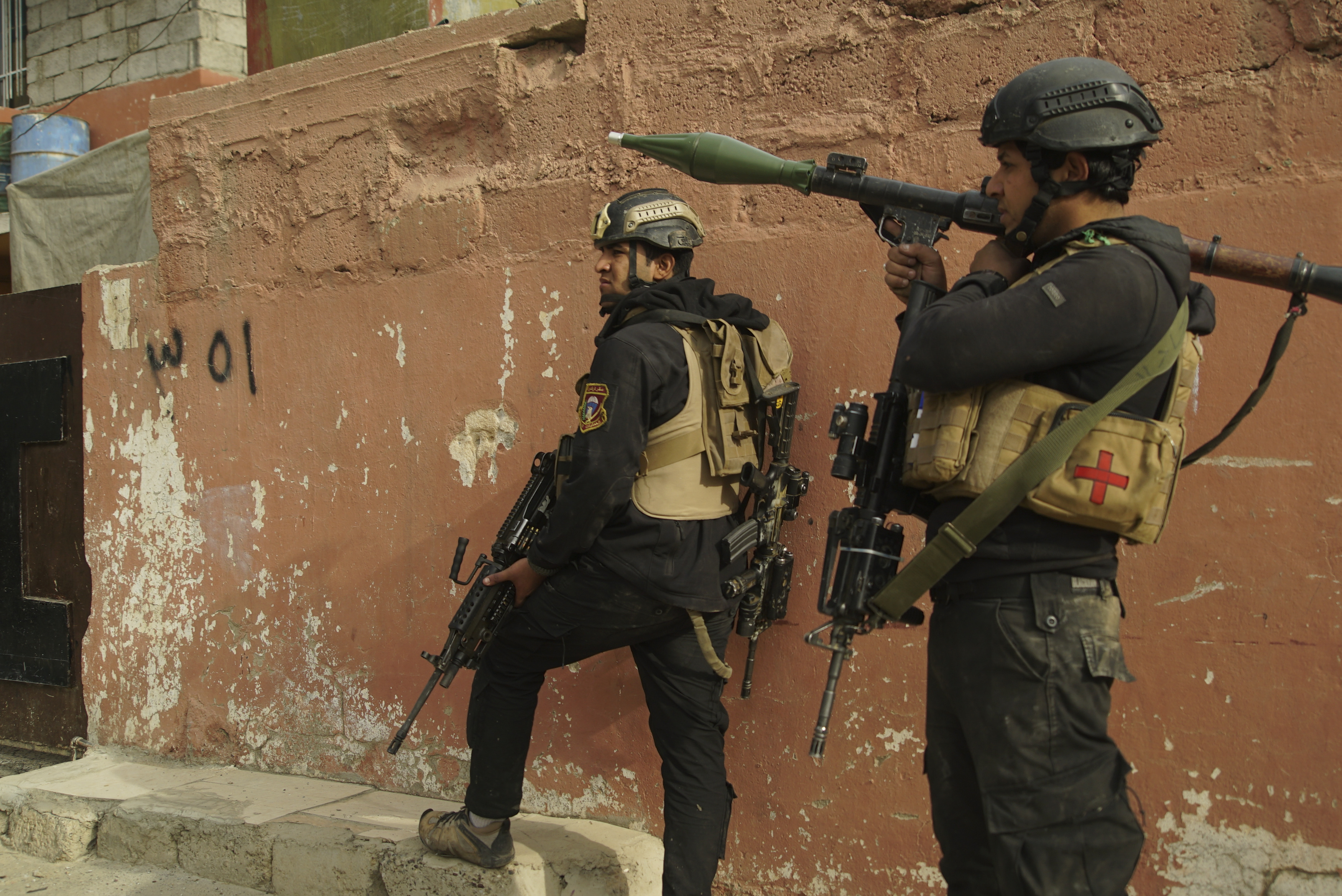
Iraqi Special Operations Forces soldiers in Mosul during the Battle of Mosul, 16 November 2016.

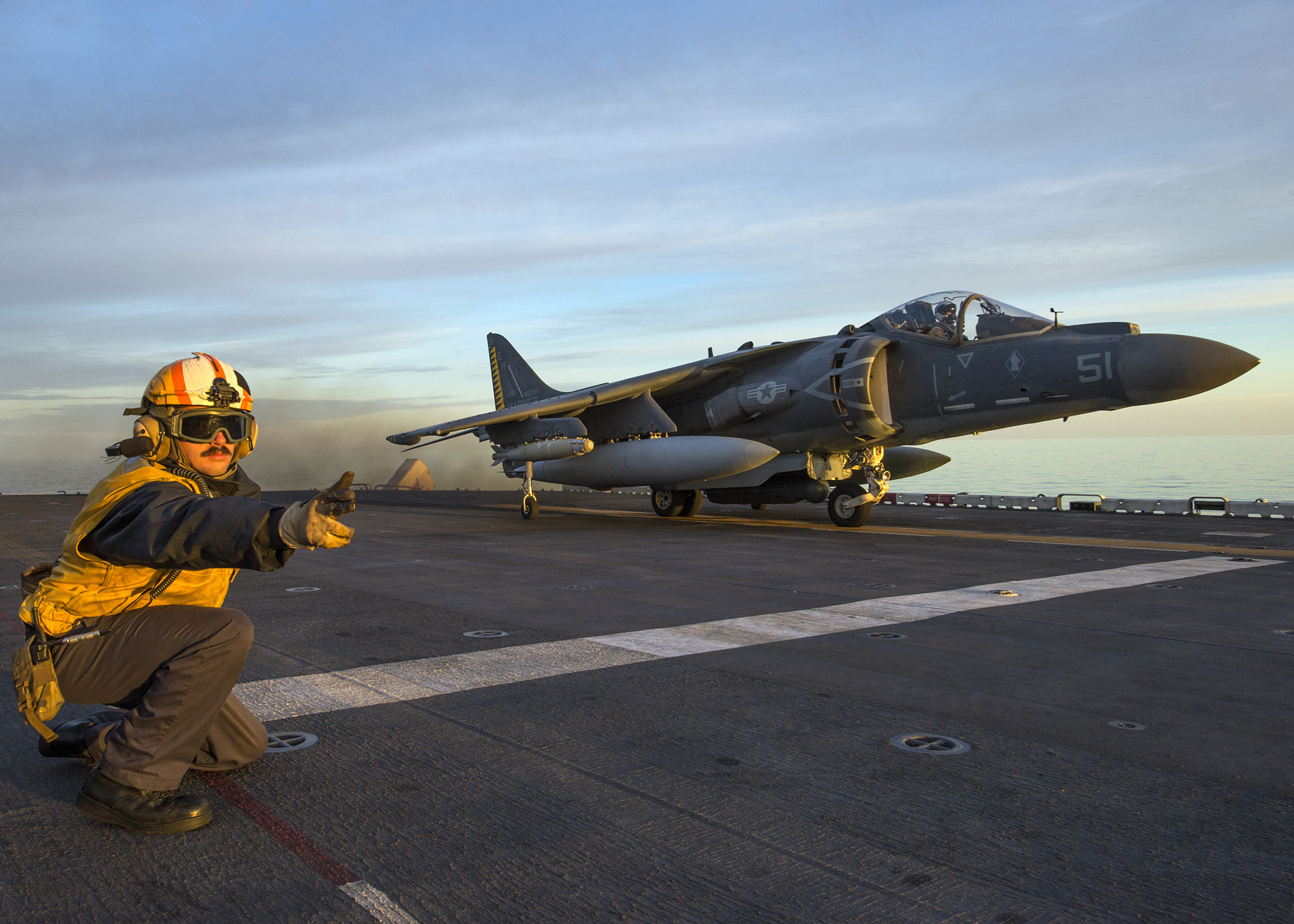
A U.S. Marine Corps AV-8B Harrier assigned to the 22nd MEU takes off from the USS Wasp during Operation Odyssey Lightning. 5 December 2016.

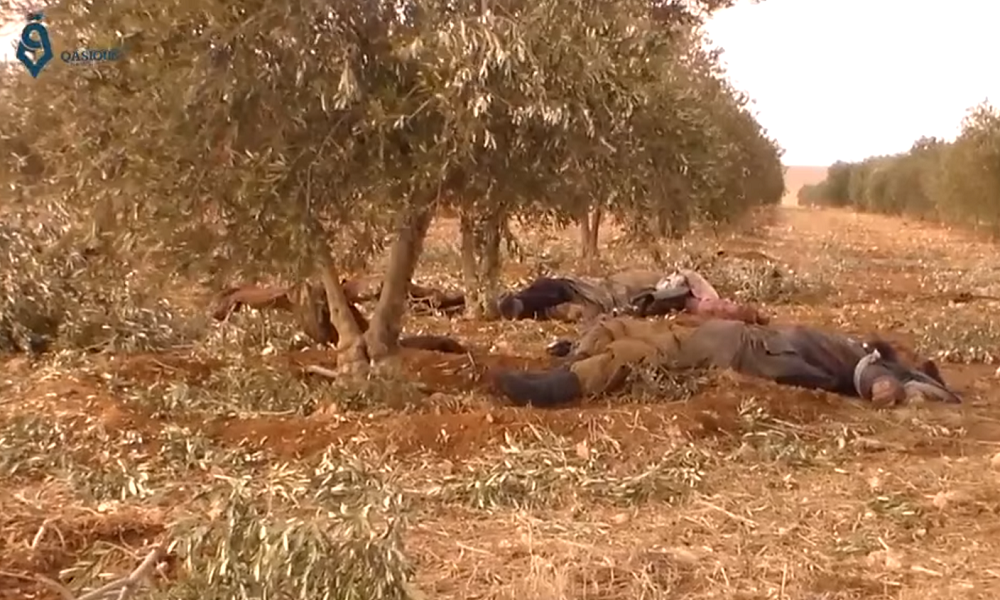
Dead ISIL terrorists near the town of Mahmudli in Syria, during the Raqqa campaign (2016–17), 17 December 2016.

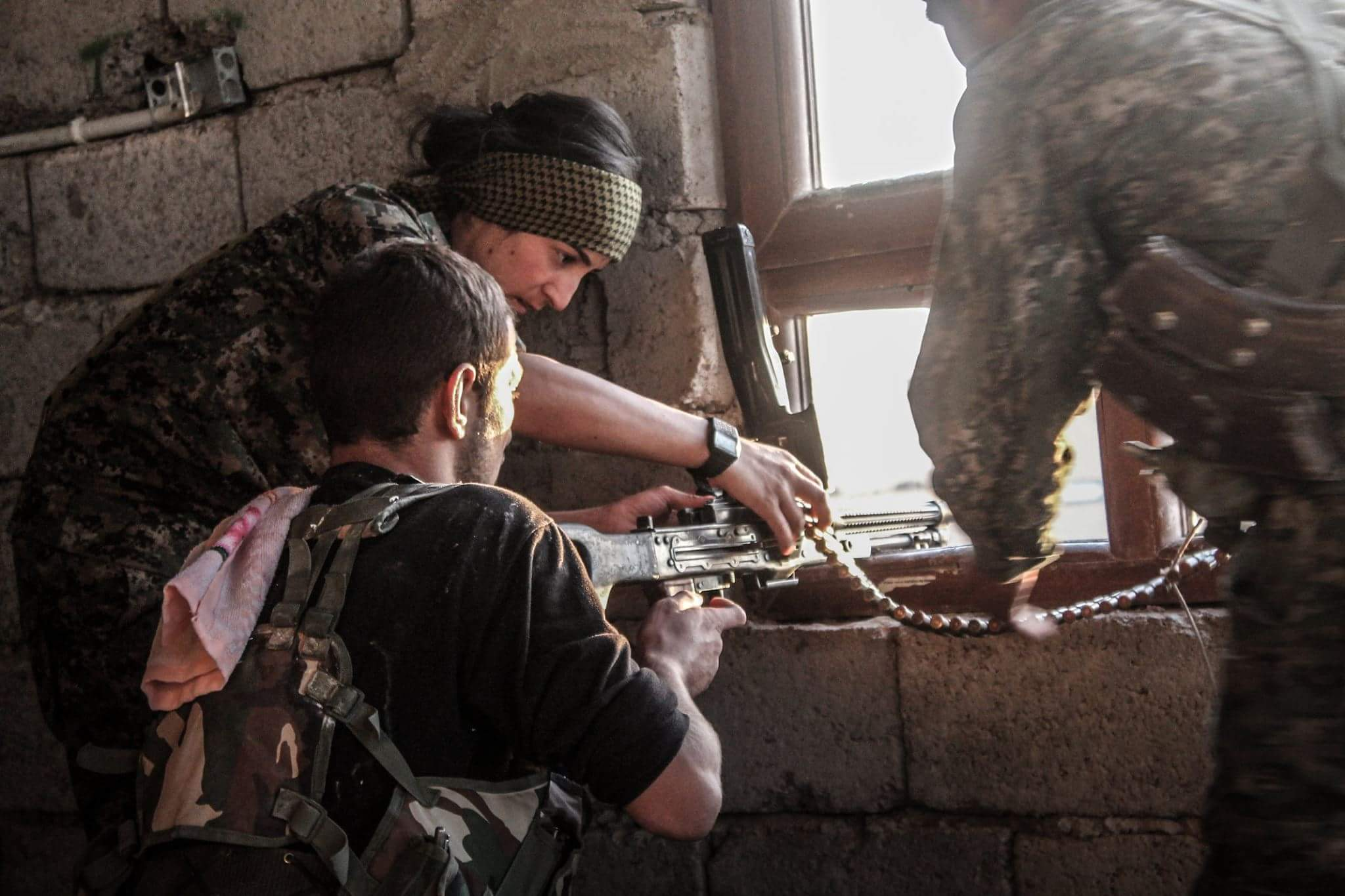
YPG and YPJ fighters of the Syrian Democratic Forces in combat during the Raqqa campaign.

Dates	Events
January 14	ISIL carries out the 2016 Jakarta attacks in Indonesia, killing 2 and injuring 24 people.
February 1–16	The Northern Aleppo offensive (February 2016) in Syria, as part of the Battle of Aleppo, takes place: Pro-Syrian Government forces, Russian, Iranian, Hezbollah and other allied militias, with the Syrian Democratic Forces fighting separately to them, launched the offensive against al-Nusra Front terrorists, Army of Aleppo rebels and militants from the Sham Legion and the Fastaqim Union, in the northern part of Aleppo Governorate. The offensive was a success, in particular, Pro-government forces ended the Siege of Nubl and Al-Zahraa and Syrian Democratic Forces seized the Menagh Military Airbase. Between 397 and 423 terrorists, rebels and militants were killed whilst 161 Pro-Government forces and Syrian Democratic Forces were killed.
February 2–20	The Southern Abyan Offensive (2016) takes place: AQAP terrorists succeeded in uniting its western and eastern parts of its Emirate in Yemen, marking the beginning of the Abyan Governorate clashes.
February 2 – May 22	The Siege of Fallujah (2016) takes place: As part of the Anbar campaign (2015–16), Iraqi and Iranian forces, supported by the coalition, surrounded a besieged the ISIL-held city of Fallujah, (the city fell to ISIL and other militants during their offensive in Al Anbar Governorate in 2014) to pave way for an eventual assault on the city. Over at least 520 terrorists were killed, over 180 Iraqi tribesmen were captured.
February 9	The Battle of Ramadi (2015–16) ends after Iraqi government forces, Shia militia and Sunni tribal forces, with coalition support after successfully liberating the city as part of the Anbar campaign (2015–16) in Iraq, from ISIL occupation, killing at least over 350 terrorists whilst the combined force lost between 150 and over 297 killed and over 1,000 wounded.
February 14 – March 6	The Nangarhar Offensive takes place: Afghan forces supported by RSM troops and U.S. airstrikes in particular, carried out an operation ISIL-KP terrorists in Nangarhar Province, Afghanistan. The offensive was a success, confining and almost eliminating ISIL-KP from the Province, killing at least 200 terrorists.
Early March	Indonesian security forces began Operation Tinombala in Indonesia against the Mujahidin Indonesia Timur (MIT/EIM) – an Islamic terrorist group that pledged allegiance to ISIL.
March 2 – April 17	The Second Battle of Tikrit, as part of the Salahuddin campaign, takes place: Iraqi and Iranian forces, supported by the coalition, successfully liberated the city from ISIL occupation. At least 230 to over 1,000 of the combined force were killed; Between 842 and 1,142 terrorists were killed and a further 80 captured.
March 22	The 2016 Brussels bombings in Belgium, carried out by ISIL, kills 31 and injures 300 people.
March 24 – September 22	The 2016 Mosul offensive takes place: Iraqi and Kurdish forces, supported by the coalition forces began the offensive to liberate Mosul and the surrounding region (Southwest Erbil Governorate and Nineveh Governorate) in Iraq. In late September Al-Shirqat District in Salahuddin Governorate, ISIL attacks/attempts to recapture the area ended on October 8-thus ending the Salahuddin campaign, the combined force liberated the region, paving the way for battle to retake the city of Mosul. Iraqi government forces lost at least 62 killed and 254 wounded, Kurdish forces lost at least 20 killed and 150 wounded, the coalition lost at least 1 killed and 2 wounded; over 1,300 ISIL terrorists were killed.
April 3	The main phase of Operation Zarb-e-Azb ends, clearing 98% of North Waziristan by December 2015, killing 3,500 terrorists and arresting over 1,000, whilst Pakistani forces suffered 587 killed and 2,194 injured.
April 24–25	The 2016 Battle of Mukalla takes place: Yemeni forces loyal to Abdrabbuh Mansur Hadi, supported by US, UAE and Saudi Arabian forces, liberated the capital of al-Qaeda's Emirate in Yemen, Mukalla, in Yemen's Hadramaut Governorate, killing between 189+ to 800 AQAP terrorists and other militants and capturing a further 8 to 250; coalition forces lost 27 soldiers killed and 60 wounded. the seizure of the city marked the beginning of the Hadramaut Insurgency.
May 22 – June 28	The Battle of Fallujah (2016) in Al Anbar Governorate takes place as part of the Anbar campaign (2015–16): Following the success of the siege of the city, Iraqi and Iranian forces, supported by the coalition, assaulted and successfully liberated the city from ISIL occupation, killing over 2,500 terrorists and capturing a further 2,186; between at least 394 to over 900 of the combined force was killed and a further 3,308 wounded.
June 30	The Anbar campaign (2015–16) ends with Iraqi and coalition forces successfully liberating most of Al Anbar Governorate, with only 20% of the Governorate remaining under ISIL control.
July 1/2	The Dhaka attack in Bangladesh, carried out by either Jamaat-ul-Mujahideen Bangladesh (JMB) or ISIL, killed 24 and injured 50, 5 terrorists were also killed.
July 8	Indian security forces killed Burhan Wani, the leader of Hizbul Mujahideen (HIM), and 2 other terrorists in a raid in the village of Bumdoora, Kokernag, Jammu and Kashmir, India.
July 14	The 2016 Nice truck attack in France kills 86 and injures 202 people, the attack was carried out by ISIL.
July 15	U.S. intelligence agencies and congress released declassified "The 28 Pages" from the inquiry commission report, revealing that some of the September 11 hijackers received financial support from individuals connected to the Saudi Government.
July 18	The leader of MIT/EIM, Abu Wardah alias Santoso, and another MIT terrorist was killed in a firefight with Indonesian security forces in a jungle near Poso, Indonesia.
July 23–30	Hours after the Kabul bombing that was carried out by ISIL-KP, Afghan forces and U.S. special forces backed by U.S. airstrikes began a scheduled operation called "Wrath of the Storm" to retake parts of Nangarhar province in Afghanistan from ISIL-KP. The operation was a success, an estimated 300 ISIL-KP terrorists were killed, including its founder and leader Hafiz Saeed Khan; 5 US special forces were wounded.
July 28/29	The leader of Al-Nusra Front, Ahmed al-Sharaa, announced that the group changed its name to Jabhat Fateh al-Sham (JFS).
August 1 – December 19	The U.S. military, with support of other nations forces, began Operation Odyssey Lightning: A sustained campaign against ISIL in Libya, particularly around Sirte in support of the UN-backed Libyan government. Libyan government forces retook the city – which was ISIL's last stronghold in the country, killing 1,500–2,500 ISIS terrorists – in early December, Operation Odyssey Lightning concluded on December 19.
August 17	The leader of the Caucasus Emirate, Zalim Shebzukhov, was killed in a Russian special forces raid on his apartment in Saint Petersburg in Russia, along with 3 terrorists.
September 4	As part of the Turkish military intervention in Syria that began on August 24, Turkish forces and Turkish-backed Free Syrian Army, supported by US-led coalition forces and Russian forces succeeded in capturing the last remaining ISIL held villages along the Turkish border, thereby cutting the ISIL caliphate off from the rest of the world and making it difficult for them to bring in foreign fighters and supplies.
September 22	The Afghan government signed a draft peace deal with the HIG: HIG agreed to cease hostilities, cut ties to extremist groups and respect the Afghan Constitution, in exchange for government recognition of the group and support for the removal of United Nations and American sanctions against its leader, who was also promised an honorary post in the government.
September 28 – October 16	The 2016 Dabiq offensive takes place as part of the third phase of the Turkish military intervention in Syria: Turkish forces and the Turkish-backed Free Syrian Army, supported by US forces, liberated Dabiq, Sawran, Akhtarin and 43 other towns and villages in Aleppo Governorate from ISIL-occupation. Over 89 rebels and 1 Turkish soldier were killed, between 183 and over 210 ISIS terrorists killed.
October 16	The Battle of Mosul (2016–17) begins in Iraq following the 2016 Mosul offensive in southwest Erbil Governorate and Nineveh Governorate, Iraqi government, Kurdish, coalition and Iranian forces, as well as Hezbollah terrorists and Ba'athists militants to liberate the city from ISIL occupation.
October 26 – December 18	The Qandala campaign takes place in Somalia, when ISS terrorists seized the weakly defended port town in Bari region. On December 3, the Puntland Security Force began a counter-offensive which cleared the town on December 7, as well as destroying an ISS base at a village 30 km south of Qandala, where the terrorists were regrouping. 30 ISS terrorists were reportedly killed and a further 35 wounded, as well as several captured.
October 30/31	ISIL accepted a pledge of allegiance by Adnan Abu Walid al-Sahrawi and his followers, creating the Islamic State in Greater Sahara (ISGS).
October–November	Operation Active Endeavour ends following the 2016 Warsaw summit, where NATO leaders agreed to transition the operation to a non-Article 5 maritime security operation over a broader area of the Mediterranean, codenamed Operation Sea Guardian.
November 6	The Raqqa campaign in Syria begins: Syrian Democratic Forces, supported by coalition forces, launched the offensive to liberate Raqqa Governorate from ISIL occupation with the particular goal of isolating and eventually capturing the ISIL de facto capital Raqqa.
December 3	The leader of ISIL-CP, Rustam Asildarov, was killed in an FSB counterterrorism raid near Makhachkala in Dagestan, Russia, along with 4 other terrorists.
December 19	An ISIL terrorist carried out the Berlin attack in Germany, killing 13 and injuring 55.
December 31	Withdrawal of the majority of U.S. troops from Afghanistan after 15 years of war.
Unknown	Following disagreement with the leader of ISIL, Abubakar Shekau, the leader of ISWAP, broke away from the group with a large group of his followers, his faction generally became known as Boko Haram/Jamāʿat Ahl al-Sunnah li-l-Daʿawah wa al-Jihād (JAS). Abu Musab al-Barnawi was sworn in as the new leader of ISWAP.

== 2017 ==
US surveillance footage of one of the ISIL in Libya camps near Sirte, before it was destroyed in airstrikes on 18 January 2017.

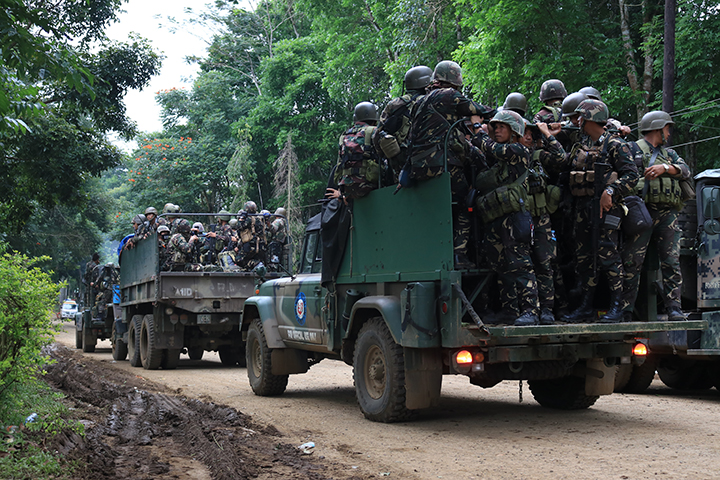
Filipino soldiers being deployed to participate in the Battle of Marawi in the Philippines, 5 June 2017.

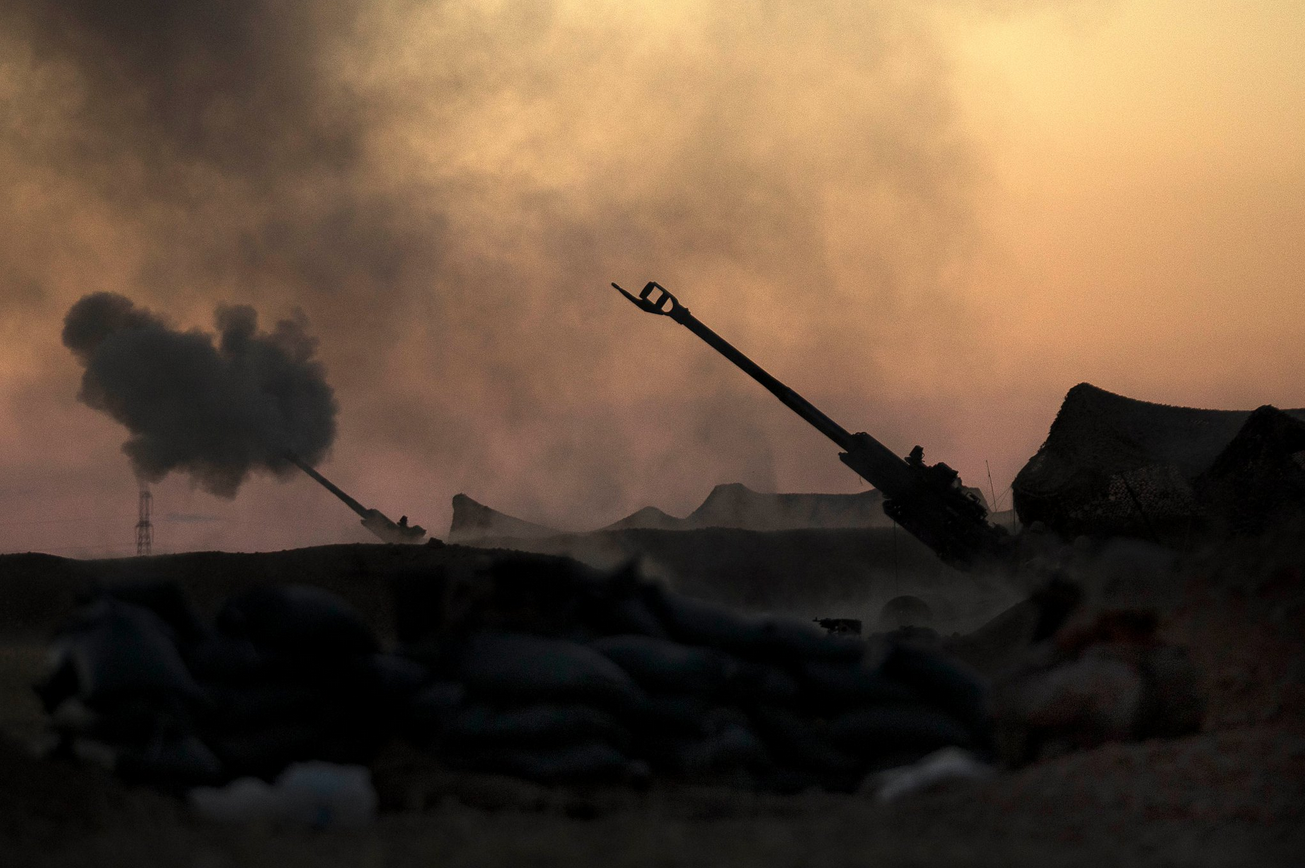
U.S. Marine Corps artillery providing fire support to the Syrian Democratic Forces during the Battle of Raqqa (2017), 21 June 2017.

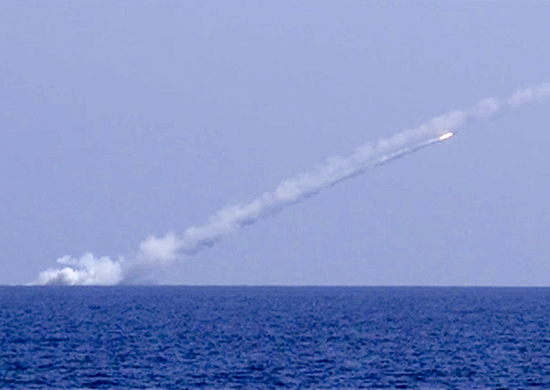
Russian submarines firing cruise missiles against ISIL in Deir ez-Zor, Syria, during the Deir ez-Zor campaign as part of the Eastern Syria campaign (September–December 2017). 14 September 2017.

Dates	Events
January 1	The Istanbul nightclub shooting in Turkey killed 39 and injured 70 people, ISIS claimed credit for the attack.
January 18	Two USAF B-2 bombers dropped around 100 bombs on two ISIS camps 28 miles south of Sirte in Libya, killing 90 terrorists. A U.S. defense official said that "This was the largest remaining ISIS presence in Libya" and that "They have been largely marginalized but I am hesitant to say they've been completely eliminated in Libya."
January 20 – March 9	The Idlib Governorate clashes (January–March 2017) took place between Ahrar al-Sham militants and JFS terrorists in Idlib Governorate, western Aleppo Governorate, and north Hama Governorate in Syria. After heavy clashes with both sides taking ground, Jund al-Aqsa (JAA) split from the JFS by February, some of the terrorists groups members later rejoined the JFS (particularly after it became the HTS) and the remainder stayed with the JAA, which rebranded itself as Liwa al-Aqsa and joined ISIL.
January 27	President Donald Trump signed Executive Order 13769, entitled Protecting the Nation from Foreign Terrorist Entry into the United States to restrict immigration from several countries in the Middle East and North Africa. The order suspends the Syrian Refugee admissions for 120 days as well as immigration from Libya, Iran, Iraq, Somalia, Sudan, Syria and Yemen, regardless of visa status or permanent residency, for 90 days, with exceptions on a case-by-case basis. The order was met by criticism and lawsuit from American Civil Liberties Union as well as protests.
January 28	The JFS became Hayat Tahrir al-Sham (HTS) after they merged with Islamist and/or jihadists groups Nour al-Din al-Zenki Movement, Ansar al-Din Front, Jaysh al-Sunna and Liwa al-Haqq.
February 13	The Lahore suicide bombing in Pakistan, carried out by members of Jamaat-ul-Ahrar (JuA), kills 17 and injures over 90 people.
February 16	The Sehwan suicide bombing in Pakistan, carried out by members of ISIL-KP, killed over 88 and injured 350.
February 22	In response to the recent terrorist attacks across Pakistan, the Pakistani military began Operation Radd-ul-Fasaad: The operation is aimed at indiscriminately eliminating the residual threat of terrorism and consolidating the gains of previous operations.
March 2	The Sahara branch of AQIM merged with Ansar Dine and Al-Mourabitoun into Jama'at Nasr al-Islam wal Muslimin (JNIM).
April 3	The Saint Petersburg Metro bombing by a terrorist from the Imam Shamil Battalion-the Caucasian or Russian branch of al-Qaeda-killed 15 people and injured a further 64.
April 26	50 US Army Rangers and 40 Afghan commandos conducted a raid in a village in Achin District, Nangarhar Province, Afghanistan, that was targeting the headquarters of Abdul Hasib, the leader of ISIL-KP, following a heavy, close-quarter firefight and the help of air support, Abdul Hasib and 34 other ISIL-KP terrorists were killed, 2 Rangers were killed and 1 wounded.
May 22	The Manchester Arena bombing in the United Kingdom killed 22 and injured 116 people, ISIL claimed responsibility.
May 23 – October 23	The Battle of Marawi in the Philippines began after an attempt by the Philippine Army to capture Isnilon Hapilon (believed to be the main ISIL leader in the Philippines) failed, resulting in large groups of terrorists affiliated with ISIL in the Philippines (including Ansar Khalifa Philippines and the Maute group) and the Bangsamoro Islamic Freedom Fighters (BIFF) clashing with security forces and overrunning and pillaging areas of the city with the aim of establishing a wilayat in Lanao del Sur Province with the city as its capitol. Filipino forces soon began a counteroffensive, with support from the US, Australia, China and other groups; on 16 October they killed Isnilon Hapilon, the leader of the ASG and Omar Maute, the leader of the Maute group; a week later Filipino forces liberated all ISIL-occupied areas of the city. Between 920 and 962 terrorists were killed and at least 11 captured, whilst Filipino forces lost 165 killed over 1,400 wounded.
May 27	The ASL announced it was formally dissolving itself amid heavy losses that wiped out most of its leadership and decimated its fighters.
June 6 – October 17	The Battle of Raqqa (2017), as part of the Raqqa campaign, takes place: Syrian Democratic Forces, supported by coalition forces, fought heavily with ISIL terrorists to successfully liberated the city of Raqqa, which was used as ISIL de facto capital for its caliphate and its headquarters in Syria. The success of the battle of the Raqqa campaign brought it to an end, having liberated the entire Governorate. Between at least 101 to 626 Syrian Democratic forces and coalition troops were killed, across the entire campaign roughly between 4,000 and 5,000 ISIL terrorists were killed and over 700 captured.
June 7	The Tehran attacks took place when ISIL terrorists attacked the Iranian Parliament building and the Mausoleum of Ruhollah Khomeini in Tehran, Iran, killing 18 civilians dead and injuring a further 52, 5 terrorists were killed.
July 11	A US airstrike on an ISIL-KP headquarters in Kunar province, Afghanistan, killed Abu Sayed, the leader of ISIL-KP, along with other ISIL-KP terrorists.
July 14 – October 21	The Central Syria campaign takes place: Pro-Syrian government, Iranian and Russian forces launch the campaign to capture 4,200 square miles (11,000 km^{2}) of ISIL-occupied territory in central Syria (southern Raqqa Governorate, eastern and northern Homs Governorate, eastern Hama Governorate, northwestern and southwestern Deir ez-Zor Governorate); by 9 September, the combined force ended the Siege of Deir ez-Zor. By October 21, the combined force completed the campaign having liberated 6,600 square miles (17,000 km^{2}) of territory. At least 1,394 terrorists were killed; the combined force lost 929 killed.
Mid-July	The Battle of Mosul (2016–17) ends in a decisive Iraqi, Kurdish and Coalition forces victory after successfully liberate the city from ISIL control. The city was the terrorists group's last urban strategic stronghold and largest city under its control in Iraq; as well as ending the groups territorial dominance over large areas of northwestern Iraq, it also effectively contained the group's military operations to Syria. Between over 3,000 to at least 16,467 terrorists were killed; Iraqi government forces, Kurdish, coalition, Iranian, Hezbollah and Ba'athists forces lost between 1,235 and over 1,435 killed, as well as 6,090 to over 7,120 wounded.
July 21 – August 28	The Qalamoun offensive (July–August 2017) takes place: Syrian forces loyal to Bashar al-Assad, Hezbollah and Lebanese forces with US support launched an offensive against HTS and the ISIL terrorists occupying the Lebanon–Syria border, as well as the Syrian rebel group Saraya Ahl al-Sham. The offensive succeeded with Lebanese forces and Syrian forces gaining full control of the border for the first time in six years, thus ending the Syrian Civil War spillover in Lebanon-on 27 July, a three-day ceasefire agreement was reached by Hezbollah with HTS and Saraya Ahl al-Sham in the Lebanese portion of the Qalamoun Mountains, an agreement resulted in the HTS terrorists to withdraw from Lebanon to Idlib in Syria, whilst Saraya Ahl al-Sham forces withdrew to the eastern Qalamoun Mountains. After the forces seized much of the border from ISIL terrorists following intense clashes the remnants of ISIL agreed to withdraw to Abu Kamal in Syria-marking the first time that such a large group of ISIL terrorists had agreed to a surrender deal instead of fighting to the death. At least 150 HTS terrorists were killed and 20 ISIL terrorists were killed with a further 100 captured, whilst Hezbollah terrorists lost at least 35 killed and Lebanese forces lost 3 killed.
August 17–22	2017 Barcelona attacks: 15 civilians were killed and more than 130 others were injured when a van ran over pedestrians in La Rambla of Barcelona. Two of the attackers were arrested and another, who fled, stabbed to death a civilian then stole his car in Barcelona and also ran the car into three Catalan police officers in Avinguda Diagonal of Barcelona injuring one. A woman was killed and six others injured in Cambrils attack when a car tried to run into pedestrians and later attackers stabbed people with knives, axes and machetes. Sixteen people were injured in Alcanar bombings, that police believe were intended for a Barcelona attack. In the two bombings, two terrorists were also killed. The van driver was shot dead in Subirats, a village in the south of Barcelona by Mossos d'Esquadra, the Catalan police. ISIL claimed responsibility for all the attacks.
August 21	Operation Khyber in Pakistan ended (following the subsidiary Operation Khyber-4) in a Pakistani victory having completely clearing the Khyber Agency and returning it to government control, with terrorist and militant networks destroyed and many of its members either being killed or fleeing the area.
September 14 – December 17	The Eastern Syria campaign (September–December 2017) takes place in Deir ez-Zor Governorate: pro-Syrian government, Russian and Iranian forces, with Hezbollah terrorists and other allied militias, liberated Mayadin (which ISIL had made its new de facto capital) by October 17, cleared the city of Deir ez-Zor by November 17 of any remaining ISIL terrorists, as well as liberate the border town of Abu Kamal two days later. The combined force lost over 601 killed, whilst the terrorists lost over 985 killed.
October 4	The Tongo Tongo ambush took place: ISGS terrorists attacked US and Nigerien soldiers near the village of Tongo Tongo in Tillabéri, Niger. 4 US servicemen were killed and 2 wounded, 4 Nigerien soldiers were also killed and 8 wounded, whilst at least 21 terrorists were killed.
October 5	The Insurgency in Cabo Delgado began.
October 18	A U.S. drone strike in Paktia province, Afghanistan, killed Omar Khalid Khorasani, the leader of the JuA, and 9 other terrorists.
October 26 – December 9	The 2017 Western Iraq campaign takes place which successfully liberated western Al Anbar Governorate and the remaining al-Jazira Desert (Parts of Nineveh Governorate, Salahuddin Governorate and Anbar Governorate) from ISIL-occupation, thus expelling the terrorists from their last strongholds in Iraq, ending the War in Iraq (2013–2017) and beginning the Iraqi insurgency (2017–present).
November 24	ISIL-SP terrorists carried out the Sinai mosque attack in Al-Rawda and Bir al-Abed in North Sinai Governorate, Egypt, killing 311 people and injuring at least 122.
December 19	The Insurgency in the North Caucasus ends, being replaced by the Islamic State insurgency in the North Caucasus.

== 2018 ==
Dates	Events
January 19	Presenting a new national defense strategy, the United States Secretary of Defense, Jim Mattis, says terrorism is no longer the focus of the national security of the United States. Now it is competition between great powers.
27 February	Members of the HTS broke away to form the al-Qaeda affiliated Guardians of Religion Organization/Hurras al-Din (HAD) group in Syria.
March	The remnants of Liwa al-Aqsa formed Ansar al-Tawhid (Syria), which is affiliated with al-Qaeda.
March 23	An Islamic terrorist attack in Carcassonne and Trèbes, France, kills five people, including the perpetrator.
June 18 – July 31	The Southern Syria offensive takes place: Pro-Syrian government forces, with Russian and Iranian forces, along with various militias, recaptured Daraa Governorate, Western Suwayda Governorate and Quneitra Governorate from Syrian rebels, other rebel factions, ISIL and HTS terrorists. The combined force lost over 300 killed; Rebel forces and HTS lost over 200 killed, whilst ISIL lost 310 killed and between 150 and 200 captured.
September 3	Sirajuddin Haqqani became leader of the Haqqani Network following the death of Jalaluddin Haqqani from an unspecified terminal illness.
October	Guardians of the Religion formed Rouse the Believers Operations Room with Ansar al-Tawhid (Syria) and AAI.
December 13	Scandinavian tourists Louisa Vesterager Jespersen and Maren Ueland are murdered by Islamic terrorists in the foothills of Mount Toubkal near to the village of Imlil in Morocco. At least one victim is beheaded with the murders recorded on video and posted on social media. In a previous video the perpetrators pledge allegiance to ISIS.

== 2019 ==
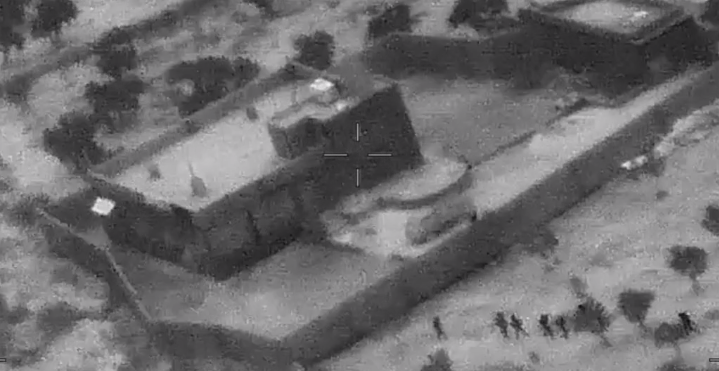
US special operations personnel advancing on the target building during the Barisha raid in Idlib Governorate, Syria, 26 October 2019.

Dates	Events
February 9 – March 23	The Battle of Baghuz Fawqani takes place: Syrian Democratic Forces, supported by coalition forces, liberated the town Al-Baghuz Fawqani and its surroundings in Deir ez-Zor Governorate, Syria, thus eliminating the last ISIL stronghold in the country and ending the caliphate the terrorist group declared in 2014, also ending the Deir ez-Zor campaign).
February 14	A JeM terrorist carried out the Pulwama attack in the Indian state of Jammu and Kashmir, killing 40 Indian security personnel. Causing the 2019 India–Pakistan skirmishes.
April 21	The Sri Lanka Easter bombings was carried out by members of National Thowheeth Jama'ath (NTJ), killing 259 and injuring more than 500 people.
April 26	Sri Lankan security forces raided an NTJ safehouse in Sainthamaruthu, Ampara District, Eastern Province, Sri Lanka, killing 15 and people linked to the group.
June 3	A joint Saudi Arabian-Yemeni counterterrorism raid in al-Mahra governorate, Yemen, captured Abu Osama al-Muhajer, the leader of ISIL-YP.
September 23	A joint US-Afghan raid on a Taliban compound in Helmand Province, Afghanistan, killed Asim Umar, the head of AQIS, along with 6 other AQIS terrorists.
October 26–27	The Operation Kayla Mueller took place: U.S. special operations forces raided a compound near Barisha, Idlib Governorate, Syria, killing Abu Bakr al-Baghdadi, the leader of ISIL, along with 5 other ISIL terrorists and a number of terrorists from the Guardians of Religion Organization.

== 2020 ==
Dates	Events
January 5	The Camp Simba attack took place: US and Kenyan troops repelled an attack by Al-Shabaab terrorists on the Manda Air Strip in Lamu County, Kenya. 1 US Servicemen and 2 contractor was killed, whilst 5 terrorists were killed and further 5 captured.
January 9	IS-GS militants assault a Nigerien military base in Chinagodrar, killing at least 89 Nigerien soldiers.
January 18	Yemeni Civil War: 111 Yemeni soldiers and 5 civilians are killed in a drone and missile attack on a military camp near Maʼrib.
January 29	Qasim al-Raymi, the leader of AQAP, was killed by a US drone strike whilst travelling in a car in Wald Rabi' District, Al Bayda Governorate, Yemen.
February 29	The United States and the Taliban signed a conditional peace agreement in Doha, Qatar, in which the Taliban pledged to prevent al-Qaeda from operating in areas under Taliban control, in return for foreign troops eventually withdrawing from Afghanistan.
March 5	The International Criminal Court authorizes the Afghanistan War Crimes inquiry to proceed, reportedly allowing for the first time for U.S. citizens to be investigated.
March 26	Militants in the Philippines, Syria, Yemen, and Libya agree to U.N. Secretary-General António Guterres' call for a ceasefire; some accept medical aid for themselves and civilians in their communities.
April 8	COVID-19 pandemic: The Saudi–led coalition declares a unilateral ceasefire in its operations against Houthi forces in Yemen in accordance with United Nations-led efforts.
April 18	44 suspected Boko Haram members are found dead, apparently due to poisoning, inside a prison in N'Djamena, Chad.
April 21	Mozambique police say 52 male villagers were killed by Islamist militants earlier this month in Muidumbe District, Cabo Delgado Province, after they refused to join their ranks.
3 May	Ansar al-Tawhid (Syria) broke away from the Rouse the Believers Operations Room, releasing a statement claiming to not be affiliated with any other groups or have any allegiance to any other group either secretly or publicly.
June 3	French special forces carried out a raid in Mali's Kidal Region which killed Abdelmalek Droukdel, the leader of AQIM, along with 3 other terrorists and capturing 1.
June 12	Rouse the Believers Operations Room reformed as the So Be Steadfast Operation Room
June 14	Khalid al-Aruri, the leader of the Guardians of Religion Organization, was killed in a US drone strike in Idlib Governorate, Syria, along with another terrorist.
August 5–11	The Mocímboa da Praia offensive took place: ISCAP terrorists seized the port town of Mocímboa da Praia in Mozambique and declared it their de facto capital. Around 70 terrorists were killed.
August 17	The TTP announced that the JuA and Hizb-ul-Ahrar (HuA) splinter groups rejoined its group.
October 23	The Second Libyan Civil War ends.
October–December 14	President Donald Trump announced that the United States would remove Sudan from the list of State Sponsors of Terrorism following the ousting and subsequent removal of President Omar Al-Bashir, and an agreement with the new transitional government to pay $335 million in compensation to the families of victims of the 1998 United States embassy bombings. On December 14, 2020, the United States officially removed Sudan from the list.
November 28	Koshobe massacre: Boko Haram terrorists attack a village in Borno State, Nigeria, killing 110 people and wounding 6 people.

== 2021 ==
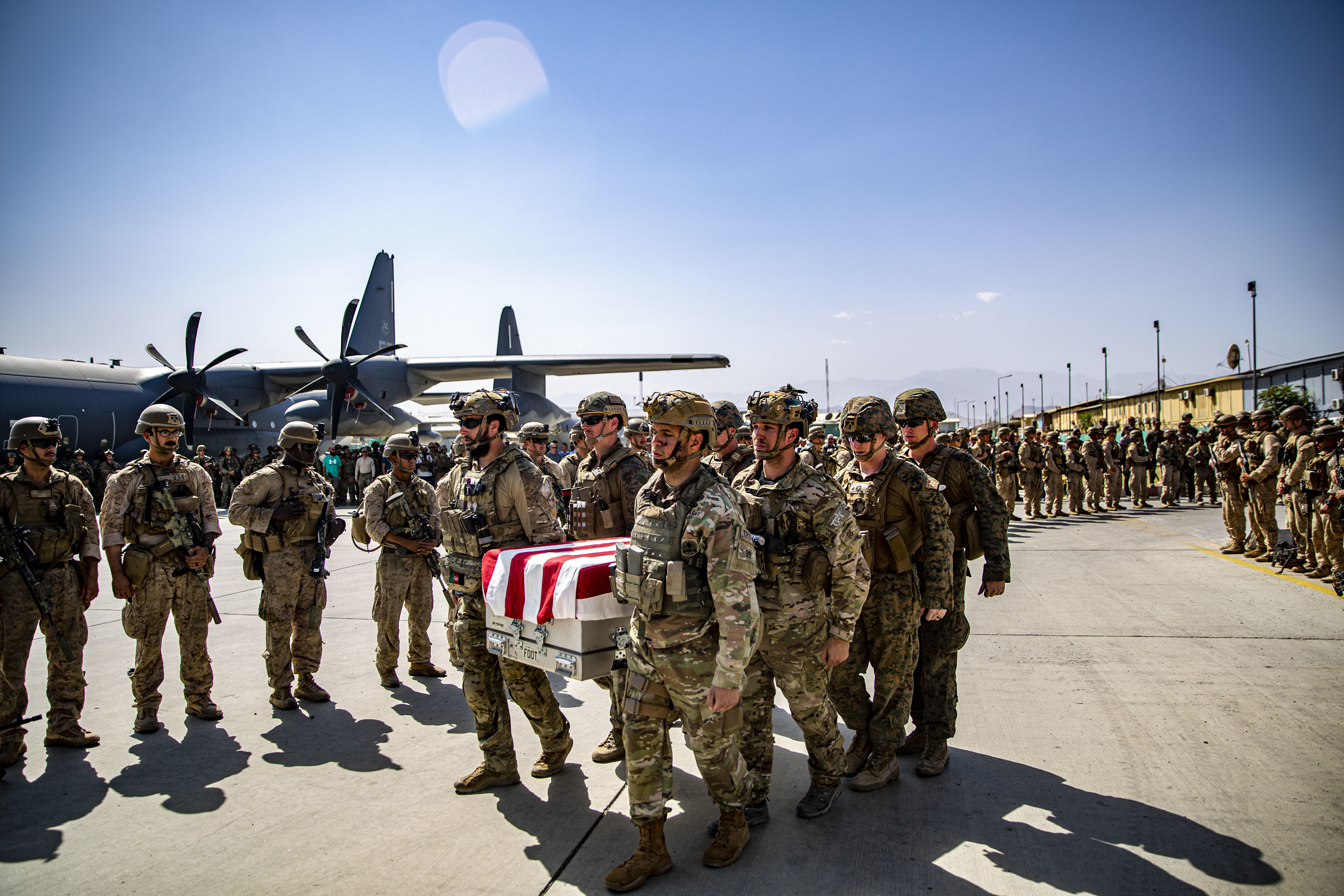
American soldiers carry the remains of fellow service members killed in the 26 August 2021 Kabul Airport attack

Dates	Events
February 4	US President Joe Biden announces that the United States will cease providing weapons to Saudi Arabia and the United Arab Emirates (UAE) for use in the Yemeni Civil War.
March 24 – April 5	The Battle of Palma took place: ISCAP terrorists supported by rebel gunmen seized the city of Palma in Mozambique. Mozambique forces eventually retook the city with support of South African private military companies.
April 22 – October 29	Battle of Mucojo takes place in Cabo Delgado, Mozambique.
May 14–19	The Battle of Sambisa Forest took place: ISWAP terrorists clashed with Boko Haram terrorists in the Sambisa Forest, Nigeria. On May 19, Abubakar Shekau, the leader of Boko Haram, was killed. ISWAP eventually seized the forest.
May 1 – August 30	The Taliban, supported by al-Qaeda, carried out an offensive across Afghanistan which successfully seized control of the country from the Afghan government, resulting in the restoration of the Islamic Emirate of Afghanistan. On 26 August, during the evacuations from Kabul airport, an ISIL-KP terrorist carried out a suicide bombing on the airport which killed 169 Afghan civilians and 13 US service members, over 150 people (including 18 US servicemembers) were injured. The offensive ended the War in Afghanistan (2001–2021).
July–November	Mozambique and Rwandan forces, supported by the SADC began offensives which retook Mocímboa da Praia and other areas under ISCAP control in August.
August 17	A French drone strike in the Dangalous Forest in Mali killed Adnan Abu Walid al-Sahrawi, the leader of ISGS, along with 9 other terrorists.
September 18	A joint operation between Indonesian military and police killed Ali Kalora, the leader of MIT, along with another terrorist in a village in the Parigi Moutong Regency, Sulawesi island.

== 2022 ==
Dates	Events
January 20–30	The Battle of al-Hasakah (2022) takes place following a prison riot by ISIL terrorists in Al-Hasakah, Syria. SDF forces, supported by American and British forces, quelled the riot, killing over 300 ISIL terrorists. SDF forces lost 121–154 killed and 120 wounded.
January 23	A coup d'état in Burkina Faso removes president Roch Kaboré from power. The Burkinabé military cites the government's failure to contain activities of Islamist militants within the country as a reason for the coup.
February 3	Abu Ibrahim al-Hashimi al-Qurashi, the leader of ISIL, killed himself and 12 more people when he detonated a bomb during a counterrorism raid by U.S. special operations forces in Atme, Idlib Governorate, Syria. An HTS fighter was also killed in a subsequent shootout.
March 4	An Afghan man on behalf of the Islamic State – Khorasan Province commits a suicide attack at a Shia mosque in Peshawar, Khyber Pakhtunkhwa, Pakistan, killing 63 people.
July 20–early August	Members of al-Shabaab invaded the Somali Region of Ethiopia from Somalia. Ethiopian National Defence Forces and Somali Region paramilitaries counter-attacked, inflicting heavy casualties on the terror group, consequently destroying the invading force.
July 31	Second Emir of Al-Qaeda, Ayman al-Zawahiri was killed in a CIA drone strike in Kabul.
August 15	French forces withdrew from Mali, but remained in the Sahel region.
September 30	A second coup d'état in Burkina Faso removes the Interim President Paul-Henri Sandaogo Damiba from power due to the junta's inability to contain the Islamist militants. Captain Ibrahim Traoré seizes power as the new interim leader.
October 29	A double car bombing by al-Shabaab in Mogadishu, Somalia kills at least 121 people and injures around 300.

== 2023 ==
Dates	Events
January 30	A Jamaat-ul-Ahrar suicide bombing inside a mosque in Peshawar, Khyber Pakhtunkhwa, Pakistan, killed 84 people and injured another 217.

== See also ==
- List of Islamist terrorist attacks
