= Battle of Palma =

Battle for the control of Palma in Mozambique

- Part of the insurgency in Cabo Delgado
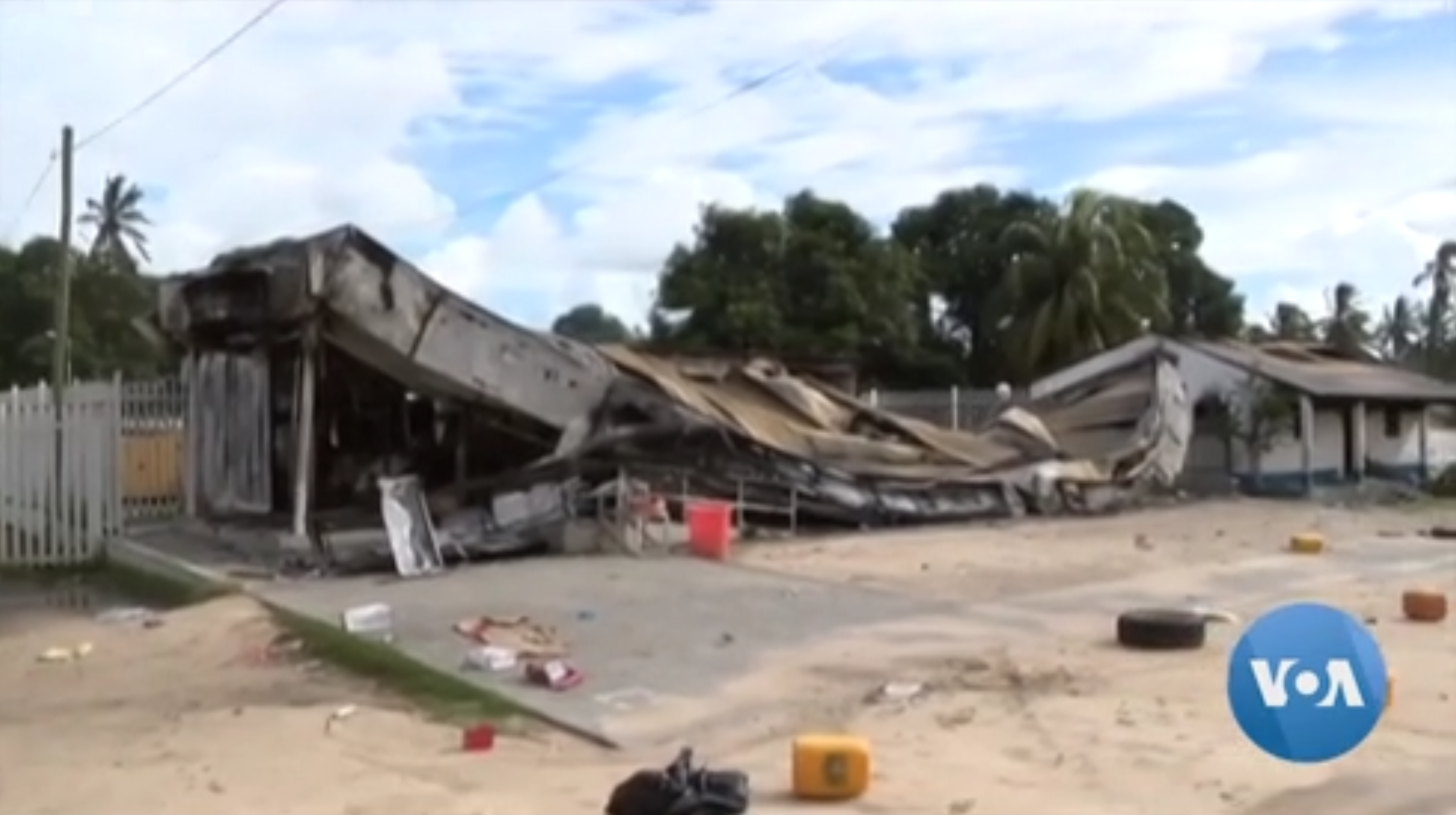
- A building destroyed during the battle
Date	24 March – 5 April 2021 (1 week and 5 days)
Location	Palma, Cabo Delgado, Mozambique 10°46′32″S 40°28′22″E
Result	Mozambican government retakes Palma, rebels maintain control over its surroundings and continue to raid the town; Palma is mostly destroyed; Oil and gas company Total SE suspends local operations

Belligerents
Mozambique	Islamic State (IS); Non-IS rebels

Commanders and leaders
Chongo Vidigal (FADM); Agostinho Muthisse (FADM); Pedro da Silva Negro (FADM); Lionel Dyck (DAG)	Bonomade Machude Omar (alias "Ibn Omar"); Abu Yasir Hassan; Unidentified Mozambican, Tanzanian, and Somali commanders

Units involved
Mozambican security forces; Mozambique Defence Armed Forces (FADM); Land Forces; Special forces; Air Force; Navy; Police (UIR); Private military companies; Dyck Advisory Group (DAG); Paramount Group; Control Risks (support role)	Ansar al-Sunna; Islamic State's Central Africa Province (IS-CAP) "Unidentified group" independent of IS

Strength
FADM: Unknown soldiers, 40 DAG-trained policemen 2 Mil Mi-24s, 1 Mil Mi-17; DAG: c. 30 personnel 3 Aérospatiale Gazelles, 2 Eurocopter AS350 Écureuils, 1 Aérospatiale Alouette III	300+ 2 or 4 boats

Casualties and losses
21+ killed (Pinnacle News); 1 helicopter damaged or shot down	Unknown; 2 boats destroyed
- 1,190+ civilians killed and 40,000 displaced 1 cargo ship possibly hijacked
- Location of Palma Palma (Africa)

The Battle of Palma or the Battle for Palma was fought during late March and early April 2021 over control of the city of Palma in Mozambique, between the Mozambique Defence Armed Forces, other Mozambican security forces and private military contractors on one side, and Islamist rebels reportedly associated with the Islamic State (IS) on another side. The Islamists invaded the city, killing dozens of people before Mozambique regained control days later. Palma was left destroyed, and a major oil and gas company decided to suspend all operations in the area due to the battle. Researchers have described the battle as an overall success for the insurgents. The rebels also maintained their presence in the town's surroundings, and continued to raid Palma in the following weeks. The battle was part of the insurgency in Cabo Delgado, which started in 2017 and has resulted in the deaths of thousands of people, mainly local civilians.

== Background ==
The insurgency in Cabo Delgado, Mozambique, began in 2017 and intensified in 2020. Islamist rebels carried out massacres in April and November. From 5–11 August, rebels reportedly associated with the Islamic State (IS) captured the city of Mocímboa da Praia during an offensive. The Islamic State's Central Africa Province (IS-CAP) declared Mocímboa da Praia its capital, and held it into 2021. In response to the escalating rebellion, the Mozambican government hired several private military companies, most importantly the South African Dyck Advisory Group (DAG). In addition, local authorities and companies operating in Cabo Delgado also employed security contractors. French energy giant Total SE which maintained a site at the Afungi peninsula near Palma, had hired at least five security companies, namely Arkhe, GardaWorld, Blue Mountain, Control Risks and G4S. Total SE maintained that its security contractors were generally unarmed. The Total SE site had been described as a project which could completely change the local economy, as it would provide a massive revenue to the Mozambican government. However, the project was controversial, as many locals had been displaced to make room for it. The Mozambique Defence Armed Forces (FADM) set up several fortified posts to protect the site at the Afungi peninsula.

By early March 2021, the rebels had begun to besiege the town of Palma. The rebels beheaded civilians from nearby villages, as well as people who were trying to flee the town. On 7 March, the rebels took the border post at Nonje at the border with Tanzania on the Ruvuma River, isolating Palma from the rest of Mozambique. The civilians who remained in Palma faced starvation. ACLED analyst Jasmine Opperman argued that an assault on Palma was expected, and that security experts had warned foreign embassies and the Mozambican government that the militants were planning an attack, only to be ignored. Opperman later tweeted "Why in God's name was no action taken in response to early warning intelligence. It's a disgrace".

The exact identity of the insurgents at Palma is unclear. One rebel identified himself as member of "al-Shabab", a local name for the group Ansar al-Sunna. Other reports claimed that the attackers were identified as belonging to IS-CAP. The relation between Ansar al-Sunna, known by a variety of names, and IS-CAP is generally unclear. Experts suspect that parts or all of Ansar al-Sunna have joined IS-CAP, but that IS central command exerts almost no control over its Mozambican affiliates. IS has taken responsibility for a relatively small number of attacks in Mozambique, compared to the overall insurgency, but has claimed its involvement in the most significant rebel operations. Following the battle, refugees stated that some of the rebel commanders were Tanzanians and Somalis. The Tanzanians declared loyalty to IS, whereas the Somalis firmly denied being part IS, instead belonging to an "unidentified group". Security sources stated that the rebels at Palma were generally well-organized and wearing uniforms. Several rebel fighters were reportedly child soldiers which would mark the first time that children were used as fighters during the insurgency.

IS and its affiliate IS-CAP later claimed responsibility for the attack on Palma via Amaq News Agency. However, the footage released by the Amaq News Agency which allegedly showcased the battle was judged by experts to have been taken weeks before the operation. Jamestown Foundation analyst Jacob Zenn argued that this hinted at some kind of communications breakdown between the Mozambican rebels and IS central command, possibly due to the death of "key media leaders on either side". Accordingly, IS had little access to images or videos from Mozambique, but still wanted to provide some proof for the involvement of its forces in the battle of Palma.

== Battle ==
=== Initial attack and Amarula Hotel ambush ===
Prior to the battle, several Islamist rebels, disguised as civilians, soldiers, and policemen infiltrated Palma, hiding weaponry and preparing for the assault. One eyewitness specified that insurgents had worn uniforms of the Rapid Intervention Unit, the Mozambican police's special operations wing. Following the battle, people from Palma voiced suspicions that locals had been involved in the rebel operation. The assault occurred as Total SE resumed work at the site. It appeared the attack was planned in advance.

On 24 March, more than 100 militants, split into two groups, launched their attack on Palma from three directions and carried out coordinated terrorist attacks at different sites. They initially targeted police stations and checkpoints, then used explosives to break into the two banks, which they robbed. They ransacked the business park, government offices, and the local military base. The rebels also systematically targeted food storages and food trucks in and around the city, capturing the contents. Residential neighbourhoods were attacked too, resulting in the death of several local civilians. People were also shot in the streets, with some of the victims then beheaded. The rebels encountered little resistance from security forces most of whom quickly retreated. A few troops attempted to organize a defense, but were overrun. The rebels quickly secured the coast as well as the main roads into the town, including a crucial crossroads, and the airfield where they shot at an incoming plane, forcing it to break off the landing.

A gas project was targeted, killing both locals and foreign workers. Several local officials, including the Palma district administrator, and others escaped from the scene and took refuge at the Amarula Hotel. The militants attacked the hotel too, killing some people at the entrance. Overall, about 220 people found refuge at Amarula Hotel, of whom 100 were locals. About 20 civilians holed up at the Bonatti Hotel. As soon as the rebels had assumed some control over Palma, more than 100 militants reinforced the city, blocked off streets inside the city and captured villages around Palma. According to some reports, two rebel boats targeted the cargo ship Alfajimbo off Palma at the same time as the land-based rebels began their assault. The insurgents reportedly successfully hijacked the Alfajimbo, though no further information surfaced on the ship's fate.

To assist the city's defenses, the FADM reportedly sent three helicopters, namely two Mil Mi-24, piloted by Ukrainian mercenaries affiliated with the Paramount Group, and one Mil Mi-17. These aircraft were supposed to aid the trapped civilians. However, the Mozambique Air Force withdrew under unclear circumstances. According to "some security sources", all FADM helicopters withdrew after one was damaged by small arms fire. Other security sources claimed that the Mil Mi-17 was shot down by a Mil Mi-24 after insurgents had hijacked the former. The Dyck Advisory Group also arrived with six light helicopters - 3 Aérospatiale Gazelle, 2 Eurocopter AS350 Écureuil and one Aérospatiale Alouette III - to attack insurgents and assist the civilians. DAG stated that they intervened without direct orders by officials. However, the DAG aircraft had to withdraw after they ran out of fuel on late 25 March or early 26 March. According to DAG director Lionel Dyck, the Paramount Group-affiliated helicopters returned once to Palma on 25 March, but withdrew again after mistakenly firing on Mozambican soldiers.

Meanwhile, the South African mercenaries told those at the Amarula Hotel that they could only try to help them again on the next day, and that they should stay put, as the rebels were possibly lying in wait to ambush anyone fleeing. A nearby Mozambican army unit of 700 to 1,100 soldiers failed to assist those besieged in Palma, not wanting to weaken its own fortified position on the Afungi peninsula, while Total SE reportedly refused to refuel the DAG's helicopters so that they could not directly return to Palma. In the morning of 26 March, DAG helicopters rescued some of those hiding at Amarula Hotel. Without official instructions by the government, the hotel manager and the DAG mercenaries decided who would be evacuated. About 20 people were rescued, including the officials and the Palma district administrator. Later that day, those remaining at the Amarula Hotel decided to attempt a breakout, as no further assistance by government forces seemed to reach them. The rebels were attacking the hotel with mortars by then. Shortly before the breakout was attempted, the hotel owner organized a last airborne evacuation using a helicopter belonging to the Everett Aviation company. The helicopter rescued some of the hotel staff, and the hotel owner's two dogs. This rescue received air cover by DAG aircraft.

A group of 20 did not join the Amarula Hotel breakout attempt, and opted to stay behind. Assisted by some security forces, about 180 hotel survivors fled with a convoy of 17 vehicles to nearby quarry. However, only seven vehicles successfully escaped from the scene, while the ten other vehicles were attacked, with their occupants murdered, and others wounded and captured. More than 40 people were killed during the convoy's breakout attempt. According to Pinnacle News, at least 21 Mozambican soldiers were killed during the operation.

Those who successfully broke through the rebel lines reached the beach. There, the South African DAG helicopters were able to evacuate them on 27 March. The mercenaries also saved the group who had stayed behind at Amarula Hotel. Some people managed to flee from Palma in boats. Six DAG helicopters continued to move around the city, trying to locate and rescue survivors. Meanwhile, the rebels had begun to loot and ravage the town, torching many buildings including the hotels as well as a clinic and destroying about two-thirds of the infrastructure. Later in the day, security sources claimed militants had seized control of the town although fighting was still taking place around Palma. The insurgents, numbering more than 300 by then, had also cut off four more hotels in Palma where foreign workers still held out.

=== Naval evacuation and government counter-attack ===
From 27 March, civilians trapped in Palma were being evacuated by boats. Several ships arrived at Palma in an attempt to aid those stranded at the beach. The passenger vessel Sea Star took about 1,400 refugees on board and brought them to safety at Pemba on 28 March. Most of those rescued by Sea Star were Total SE staff. The vessel was protected by Ocean Eagle 43, a vessel of the Mozambican navy. Those fleeing have used every vessel available, including "cargo vessels, passenger ships, tugs and recreational boats". One survivor stated that the evacuation was mostly organized by "local suppliers and companies", while other countries and the larger companies had left the civilians to their fate. The rebels actively targeted the fleeing boats with small arms and mortars, forcing some to break off rescue operations. An estimated 35,000 civilians have been displaced during the battle, seeking refuge in neighbouring towns and cities. Several had fled into the nearby forests and mangroves, while others managed to escape north across the border to Tanzania despite the Tanzanian government's initial refusal to allow refugees entry.

This is no rag-tag bunch of disorganized youths. This is a trained and determined force that has captured and held one town and is now sustaining a battle for a very strategic center.

— Unnamed intelligence analyst about the battle

On late 28 March, FADM army, navy, air force, and special forces units, supported by DAG and the London-based Control Risks security firm, launched an operation to retake Palma, but the rebels initially managed to hold onto most of the city including the harbor. However, the rebels pulled back some of the troops into the bush which made the evacuations easier. By then, about 6,000 to 10,000 refugees were still waiting for evacuation at the beaches of Palma. Thousands more were holding out at Afungi, where the Total SE project was located; the latter had not fallen to the rebels, although Total SE had evacuated most of its employees from the site. Meanwhile, soldiers and policemen cordoned off the landing zone for ships at Pemba, restricting access to the refugees. There were reports about disguised rebels having snuck onto the ships, though they were discovered and their weapons secured. The Sea Star returned to Palma after unloading its passengers, evacuating more civilians including many more locals than during its first run.

On 29 March, IS officially claimed that its troops had captured Palma, (Note: The Amaq News Agency stated that "the attack was upon military barracks and government headquarters and the attack resulted in the capture of the city after killing at least 55 soldiers from the Mozambican army and Christians, among them subjects of Crusader states, and wounding dozens others.") while FADM claimed to have retaken the town. However, fighting continued "in pockets [...] across the town" between the rebels, and the army, police and the mercenaries, with reports of beheaded bodies strewn over the streets. According to Lionel Dyck, his airborne forces engaged "several little groups and [...] one quite-large group" of insurgents. Dyck assessed that it would be difficult for the government to retake the town, and one security expert also argued that Palma was a "game-changer", as the rebels proved to be much better trained, armed, and organized than ever before. By 30 March, "sporadic clashes" continued at Palma. About 5,000 civilians had taken refuge around a lighthouse at Afungi peninsula where the Total SE project was based. The company reportedly provided these refugees with food and water. On the same day, DAG director Dyck declared in an interview that "as I sit here, Palma is lost", specifying that a major response by the Mozambican government was necessary to drive the rebels from the town. He claimed that the insurgents were disguising themselves as civilians to avoid air attacks. DAG reportedly continued its attempts to help people escape who were hiding in bush around Palma.

On 31 March, fighting at Palma had reportedly calmed down, as the FADM moved into the town and started to retake it. Showing "tactical awareness", the rebels did not try to hold the plundered town, instead gradually retreating. FADM army spokesman Chongo Vidigal claimed that Palma remained disputed, but that the military had established some control over the port area. Meanwhile, DAG helicopters continued to fly missions. On the same day, Botswana's President Mokgweetsi Masisi, South Africa's Cyril Ramaphosa and Zimbabwe's Emmerson Mnangagwa held a meeting to discuss ways to help Mozambique fight the insurgent groups. On 1 April, rebels were able to seize two boats at the beaches, one "small landing craft" and a "nine-meter motor boat". The rebels continued to operate both vessels until helicopters supporting the government forces destroyed them the next day.

On 2 April, there were reports of the rebels launching attacks on the Afungi peninsula; some stated that the rebels had attacked FADM troops protecting the Total SE facility, others claimed that they had targeted civilians who had fled to Quitund, a village next to the site. The World Food Programme (WFP) temporarily suspended evacuation flights from Palma due to the deteriorating security situation in the city. The WFP elaborated that it was "concerned about the increasing violence in Cabo Delgado" adding that it is leading to displacement of population. On the same day, Cyril Ramaphosa said that South African troops had been sent to Palma to help evacuate South African citizens. Sporadic clashes continued on 3 April, as rebels repeatedly launched short raids against FADM troops in Palma before retreating again. The government forces finally secured the local airfield, with FADM commander Vidigal later stating that his troops had encountered most resistance there.

On 4 April, FADM claimed that it had fully recaptured Palma, allegedly killing a significant number of militants, while DAG aircraft left the area. On 5 April, it was confirmed that FADM had secured Palma, although the rebels continued to control the town's surroundings. However, a Sky News team reporting from the town were hastily evacuated after hearing a gunshot. Much of the town was left plundered and destroyed, and few civilians were willing to return. The FADM continued security sweeps. Some returning civilians had begun to loot in the town, often for food. The security forces soon joined in plundering what was left in the town. However, rebels maintained a strong presence in the area, and continued to launch raids into the town.

== Impact ==
A report by the conflict observatory Cabo Ligado concluded that "the attack is a major victory for the insurgency". The rebels retreated with a large amount of loot, including 23 tons of food, and around $1 million in cash. In contrast, the Mozambican government portrayed the battle as its own victory, overplaying its assistance to local civilians. It sharply limited the local media's ability to cover the events, pushing its own narrative in Mozambique.

The battle threatened plans by the Mozambican government to extract Cabo Delgado's significant liquid natural gas (LNG) reserves. In particular, Total SE had made its work at the Afungi complex dependent on the government's ability to maintain a 25-kilometer security perimeter around the Afungi. As this perimeter had included Palma, Total SE announced that it would abandon work at the site due to the rebellion. By 2 April, the company had completely abandoned the Afungi site, leaving it to the FADM.

Following the attack, Mozambique and Portugal quickly finalized existing plans for a training mission to support the FADM. Brazil also offered support to Mozambique in response to the events at Palma. The British government is also considering a similar offer of support to Mozambican forces, according to diplomatic sources. The move comes after a reshuffle in the British Armed Forces and the creation of Rangers, similar to the US Green Berets, described as a second-tier special forces battalion designed to train and combat insurgent groups.

=== Casualties ===
For the first time during the insurgency, the rebels "deliberately targeted foreign workers". In its publication on the battle, IS boasted that its operation "resulted in the deaths of 55 Mozambican forces and Christians including contractors from outside the country". The Mozambican government officially admitted that seven people had died in the Amarula Hotel ambush, while independent observers estimated that up to 50 had died during the hotel attack. Overall, the Mozambican government estimated that "dozens" had died during the battle. By 3 April, only 9,900 of those displaced had been registered in Pemba and other parts of Cabo Delgado, according to UN humanitarian agency OCHA. In regards of the rest of the displaced, Médecins Sans Frontières said that they could still be hiding in the surrounding forests. There were also reports of a contractor who witnessed people being eaten by crocodiles or that drowned in deep mud. On 9 April 2021, analyst Jacob Zenn put the confirmed death toll at 21 Mozambican soldiers and 40 civilians. By May 2021, there were reports of dozens of local civilians and up to 50 contractors (both natives and foreigners) having been killed.

A South African man, Adrian Nel who was driving one of the convoys' vehicles and a British contractor are confirmed killed during the attacks. The beheaded bodies of 12 more foreigners were found on 8 April, including a 38-year-old Zimbabwean man. A Portuguese citizen was confirmed wounded after being shot, and was rescued alongside two workers from Ireland and New Zealand.

=== Controversies ===
In May 2021, an Amnesty International report alleged that white people had been prioritized for rescue over black people. The report alleged that white contractors were airlifted from Palma before its black inhabitants, after conducting interviews with eleven black survivors of the siege. The DAG group rejected the allegations by Amnesty. A report by The New York Times also suggested that native and foreign contractors had been prioritized over locals during the evacuations.

== Aftermath ==
Sporadic rebel attacks on Palma continued during April. By May 2021, gunfights and fires were reported in regular intervals in Palma, as rebels continued to raid the town, again forcing local civilians to flee. Just 100 civilians were living in Palma as of August 2021.

== See also ==
- List of wars and battles involving ISIL
- List of ongoing armed conflicts
- List of wars involving Mozambique
- Mocímboa da Praia offensive
