= List of wars involving Botswana =

This is a list of wars involving Botswana.

== The military in modern Botswana ==
Since its independence in 1966, Botswana has only maintained a limited military, in the form of the Botswana Defence Force. Upon gaining independence, Botswana relied on police in a lieu of a military, with a single paramilitary group in the form of the Police Mobile Unit.

The BDF was formed in 1977 in response to border incursions from Rhodesia and further shaped by incursions from apartheid South Africa in the 1980s. As a defensive force, the BDF has engaged in limited external military actions, focused on international peacekeeping, and limiting Botswanan involvement in wars.

== List ==
Conflict	Combatant 1	Combatant 2	Result
Battle of Dimawe (1852)	Various Botswana (Bakwena, Batlokwa, Balete, Batswapong, and Bahurutshe) tribal warriors	Voortrekkers	Victory
World War II (1939-1945)	Allied Powers: limited involvement as the Bechuanaland Protectorate	Axis Powers	Victory
Operation Restore Hope (1992-1993) Two members of the Botswana Defense Force in Mogadishu, Somalia, January 1993.	UNITAF: Australia; Bangladesh; Belgium; Botswana; Canada; Egypt; Ethiopia; France; Germany; Greece; India; Italy; Kuwait; Malaysia; Morocco; New Zealand; Nigeria; Norway; Pakistan; Saudi Arabia; Spain; Tunisia; Turkey; UAE; United Kingdom; United States; Zimbabwe	United Somali Congress	UN success
Operation Boleas (1998–1999)	SADC: South Africa; Botswana	Lesotho opposition: Pro-opposition faction of the LDF	Victory
Insurgency in Cabo Delgado (2021–present)	Mozambique; Rwanda; SAMIM: South Africa; Botswana; Lesotho; Tanzania; Angola; Zambia; Malawi	Ansar al-Sunna; Islamic State of Iraq and the Levant	Ongoing
