= Lionel Dyck =

Zimbabwean mercenary and soldier (1944–2024)

Colonel Lionel Dyck SCZ
- Born: January 1944; Southern Rhodesia
- Died: 30 May 2024 (aged 80); Cape Town, South Africa
- Military career
- Allegiance: Rhodesia (1961–1980); Zimbabwe (1980–1990); Dyck Advisory Group (2012–2024)
- Branch: Rhodesian Army; Zimbabwe National Army
- Service years: 1961–1990
- Rank: Colonel
- Nickname: Colonel Dyck
- Unit: Rhodesian Light Infantry
- Commands: Rhodesian African Rifles; 1 Parachute Battalion
- Conflicts: Rhodesian Bush War; 1981 Entumbane uprising; Insurgency in Cabo Delgado; Battle of Palma

Colonel Lionel Dyck SCZ (1944 – 30 May 2024), also referred to as Colonel Dyck, was a Zimbabwean soldier and security contractor. He was born in 1944 in Southern Rhodesia and served with the Rhodesian Army and then the Zimbabwe Defence Forces before founding and leading companies such as the Dyck Advisory Group (DAG) which provided specialist security services including anti-poaching, demining and counterinsurgency.

== Military career ==
Dyck was born in 1944 in Southern Rhodesia. When he was 17, he joined the Rhodesian Army and was placed in the Rhodesian Light Infantry (RLI). He was court-martialed and expelled from the army after driving a Unimog truck whilst drunk, resulting in him killing an RLI soldier.

He underwent further education in South Africa and gave up drinking. He re-enlisted in the Rhodesian Army during the Rhodesian Bush War. He later became a major in the Rhodesian African Rifles (RAR).

Following the country's transition into Zimbabwe, Dyck played a frontline role commanding the RAR in the 1981 Entumbane uprising. The RAR were disbanded in 1981 and the majority of white officers had left the new Zimbabwe National Army. Dyck remained and led the new country's Parachute Battalion, formed from former RAR and Selous Scouts soldiers as well as former ZIPRA and ZANLA guerrillas.

Dyck's 1st Parachute Battalion conducted the first military operation in Matabeleland, code-named Operation Octopus. This group also operated in the region during the 1983 Matabeleland Massacres (known locally as Gukurahundi) in which an estimated 20,000 people were killed in the mostly-Ndebele area that was loyal to the ZAPU faction, President Robert Mugabe's political enemy. Dyck was alleged to have participated in several acts of torture during this 1980s repression in Matabeleland.

Dyck forged a close working relationship with the Zimbabwean Minister of Defence (later President) Emmerson Mnangagwa during his military career and was awarded the Silver Cross of Zimbabwe (SCZ). In 1986, he was appointed as a Commissioner of Oaths.

He retired from the army in 1990 as a colonel and moved to South Africa. Whilst in South Africa, he became a commodore of the False Bay Yacht Club.

== Mercenary career ==
In South Africa, Dyck founded a demining and anti-poaching company. This business made him wealthy and he branched out into private military contracting, private security and animal conservation. Utilising his contacts with Mnangagwa, in 2008 he set up a company called MineTech where a leaked diplomatic cable described them as "business partners".

In 2012, he set up Dyck Advisory Group (DAG) as a mercenary, demining and anti-poaching group. In 2019 and 2020, he was hired by the Government of Mozambique to provide air cover for Mozambique soldiers during the RENAMO insurgency. Dyck and his forces were credited with driving RENAMO out of Northern Mozambique. In 2021, aged 77, he was hired by the Mozambique police to provide military assistance against Islamic terrorists, fighting on the front line in the Battle of Palma.

The DAG had been accused by Amnesty International of firing into random crowds; Dyck responded that armed insurgents running into crowds was a common tactic used by terrorists. Dyck also helped to co-ordinate the evacuation of civilians from the area.

== Death ==
Dyck died of cancer in Cape Town, South Africa, on 31 May 2024, aged 80.
