= Charles Fries (diplomat) =

French senior civil servant (born 1962)

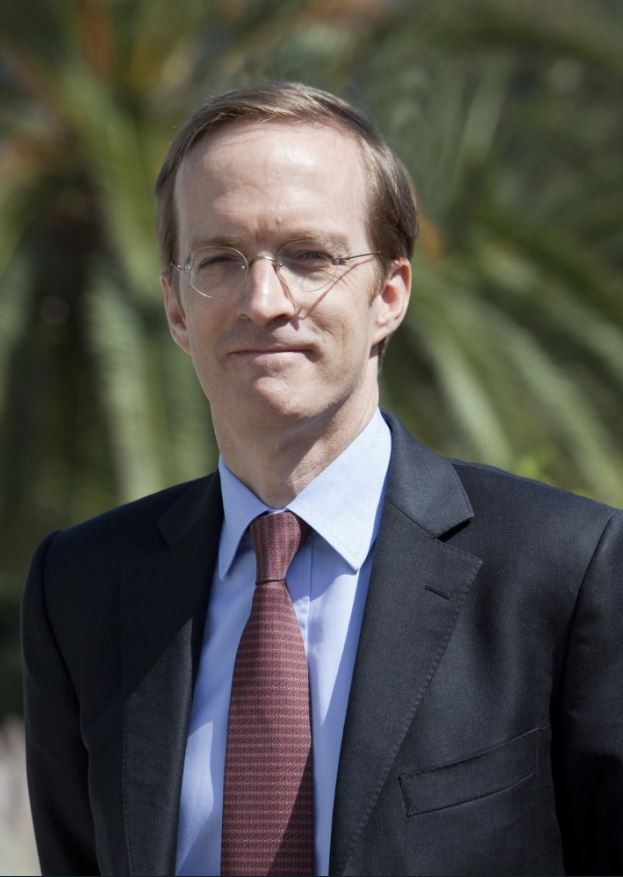
- Born: 30 December 1962 (age 63). Lyon, France
- Occupations: EEAS Deputy Secretary General for Peace, Security and Defence
- Organization: European External Action Service (EEAS)
- Website: https://www.eeas.europa.eu/eeas/eu-peace-security-and-defence_en

Charles Fries (born 30 December 1962) is a senior civil servant and French diplomat. He is the brother of Fabrice Fries, Chief Executive Officer of the news agency Agence France Presse.

== Education ==
Fries graduated from the Institut d'Etudes Politiques de Paris in 1983 (public service section) and in 1985 from the Université Panthéon-Sorbonne with a master's degree in public law. He was a student at Ecole Normale d'Administration (ENA) in the "Liberté, Egalité, Fraternité" class (1989). In 1984, he obtained a higher teaching diploma from the Ecole Normale de Musique de Paris (piano).

== Career ==
=== External Affairs (France) ===
After graduating from ENA, Charles Fries chose a career in the diplomatic service and joined the French Ministry of Foreign Affairs (Quai d'Orsay) in 1989. He was initially assigned to the Economic Cooperation Department, where he dealt with European issues (common agricultural policy, structural funds, budget, etc.). In 1993, he joined the cabinet of the Minister of Foreign Affairs, Alain Juppé, as technical adviser in charge of European issues. In 1995, he moved to the French Embassy in London as spokesman and press counsellor. Upon his return to Paris in 1998, he was deputy director at the Quai d'Orsay, firstly for internal Community affairs (1998/2000) and then for the Community's external relations (2000/2002).

=== Cabinet advisor ===
In May 2002, following the re-election of President Jacques Chirac, he joined the cabinet of the new Minister of Foreign Affairs, Dominique de Villepin, before joining the diplomatic team at the Elysée Palace as Europe Adviser (July 2002-September 2006). During this period, Fries was particularly involved in the negotiation and ratification of the European Constitutional Treaty, Franco-German relations and EU enlargement.

=== Ambassador ===
In September 2006, he was appointed French Ambassador to the Czech Republic.

In November 2009, he returned to Paris as Diplomatic Adviser to Prime Minister François Fillon. From November 2011 to April 2012, he combined this role with that of Secretary General for European Affairs (SGAE).

In May 2012, he was appointed Ambassador of France to Morocco and then, from August 2015 to April 2020, Ambassador of France to Turkey.

=== EEAS Brussels ===
In May 2020 Fries was appointed Deputy Secretary-General of the European External Action Service of the European Union (EEAS), the diplomatic service of the European Union, in charge of peace, security and defence issues at EU level. Reporting to the High Representative for Foreign and Security Policy, Kaja Kallas, he is responsible for promoting the role of the European Union so that it is better able to defend its security interests and respond to external crises.

Fries played a significant role in shaping major EU security and defence interventions through his tenure as EEAS Deputy Secretary General. Most notably, he has steered the inception and preparation of the 2022 Strategic Compass for Security and Defence - the EU security and defence strategy - the planning and negotiation of the EU military support to Ukraine, the oversight of EU missions and operations, such as EULEX Kosovo and EUMM Georgia, and the establishment of new ones such as the EU Mission in Armenia, EUTM Mozambique, and EUNAVFOR ASPIDES.

== Honours ==
Knight of the National Order of Merit (2007)

Knight of the Legion of Honour (2013)

== See also ==
CV in the European External Action Service (EEAS) website
