= Abu Yasir Hassan =

Tanzanian terrorist

- Born: 1981 or 1983; Tanzania
- Military career
- Allegiance: Islamic State (IS)
- Rank: Leader of IS forces in Mozambique
- Units: Mozambique Province; (Islamic State) Ansar al-Sunna
- Conflicts: Insurgency in Cabo Delgado

Abu Yasir Hassan (born 1981 or 1983), also known as "Yaseer Hassan" or as "Abu Qasim", is a Tanzanian national who currently serves as one of the leaders of the Islamic State's Mozambique province. By August 2020, the group had evolved into a proto-state after the group captured Mocímboa da Praia and several other areas of Cabo Delgado Province.

== Biography ==
Abu Yasir Hassan was born in Tanzania at some point between 1981 and 1983. He became the leader of al-Shabaab, an Islamic extremist sect and rebel group in Mozambique, around October 2017. His force joined the Islamic State about 2018/2019.

In March–April 2021, Abu Yasir Hassan co-commanded the rebel attack on the town of Palma.

== Designation as a 'Specially Designated Global Terrorist' ==
In March 2021, he was designated as a 'Specially Designated Global Terrorist' by the United States due to his activities in the insurgency and his known links to IS. The leader of IS in the Democratic Republic of the Congo, named Seka Musa Baluku, was also placed on the U.S State department's terrorist list due the group's actions in the Kivu Conflict and the Allied Democratic Forces insurgency.
