= 2020 Mozambique attacks =

Terrorist incidents in Mozambique

- Part of the insurgency in Cabo Delgado
- Location of Cabo Delgado Province in Mozambique
- Location: Mozambique
- Date: 7 April and 9 November 2020
- Attack type: Massacres, kidnapping, arson
- Deaths: 102
- Perpetrator: Islamic State

The 2020 Mozambique attacks included multiple attacks launched by insurgents of Islamic State's Central Africa Province and other groups. The attacks left at least 102 people dead.

== Attacks ==
7 April 2020 - Mozambique police say 52 male villagers were killed by Islamist militants. The attack occurred in Xitaxi, Muidumbe District, Cabo Delgado Province, after they refused to join their ranks.

9 November 2020 - Militant Islamists behead at least 50 people in several villages in Cabo Delgado Province. In addition, the insurgents burned homes and kidnapped women during their raids. United Nations Secretary General António Guterres expressed his shock and condemned the "wanton brutality" of the massacres.

== See also ==
- 2020 in Mozambique
- List of Islamist terrorist attacks
- List of terrorist incidents in 2020
- List of terrorist incidents linked to ISIL
