= List of wars involving Mozambique =

The following is a list of wars involving Mozambique.

Conflict	Combatant 1	Combatant 2	Results
Angoche-Portuguese conflicts (July 1847–1910)	Portuguese Empire Portuguese Empire (1830–1910); Maganja da Costa; Licungo; Imbamella (from 1864)	Angoche Sultanate	Portuguese victory; Portuguese conquest of the Angoche Sultanate in Mozambique
East African campaign (World War I) (3 August 1914–25 November 1918)	United Kingdom; South Africa; India; Rhodesia; East Africa Protectorate; Nyasaland; Uganda; Nigeria; Belgium; Belgian Congo; Portugal; Mozambique	Germany; German East Africa	Allied victory: German East Africa partitioned by Britain, Belgium and Portugal
African theatre of World War I (3 August 1914–25 November 1918)	Entente Powers: British Empire: United Kingdom; India; Gold Coast; Nigeria; East Africa; Rhodesia; Nyasaland; Uganda; Egypt; Sudan; Somaliland; South Africa; Australia; New Zealand; France: West Africa; Equatorial Africa; Morocco; Belgium: Congo; Portugal: Angola; Mozambique; Italy (1915–1918): Tripolitania; Cyrenaica; Eritrea; Somaliland; Liberia (1917–1918)	Central Powers: Germany: Togoland; Kamerun; South West Africa; East Africa; Ottoman Empire; Co-belligerents: South African Republic (Note: In opposition to the Union of South Africa, which had joined the war, several thousand Boer rebels rose in the Maritz Rebellion and re-founded the South African Republic in 1914. The rebels allied with Germany and operated in and out of German colonial territory during the South West Africa Campaign. The rebels were defeated by British imperial forces in 1915.); Senussi Order (Note: The Senussi Order was a Muslim political-religious tariqa (Sufi order) and clan in Libya, previously under Ottoman control but lost to Italy in 1912. In 1915, the Senussi were courted by the Ottoman Empire and Germany and the Grand Senussi, Ahmed Sharif as-Senussi, declared jihad and attacked the Italians in Libya and British controlled Egypt in the Senussi Campaign.); Sultanate of Darfur (Note: The Sultanate of Darfur aligned with the Central Powers and was invaded by British forces in Sudan in the Anglo-Egyptian Darfur Expedition of 1916.); Dervish Movement (Note: The Somali Dervish Revolt began before the war. The movement received symbolic support from the Ottoman and Ethiopian governments.)	Allied victory: Annexation of the German colonies by the Entente; Termination of residual Ottoman rights in Tripolitania; Annexation of the Sultanate of Darfur by Anglo-Egyptian Sudan
Battle of Ngomano (25 November 1917)	(First Portuguese Republic) Portugal: (Portugal) Mozambique	(German Empire) Germany: East Africa	German victory
Portuguese Colonial War (4 February 1961–25 April 1974)	Angola: MPLA; FNLA; UNITA; Guinea: PAIGC; Mozambique: (Mozambique) FRELIMO	Portugal	Carnation Revolution: Military stalemate; Rebel political victory; Alvor Agreement; Algiers Accord; Lusaka Accord; Portuguese overseas territories in Africa become independent
Mozambican War of Independence (1964–1975)	FRELIMO	Portugal	Lusaka Accord: Military stalemate; FRELIMO political victory; Ceasefire following the Carnation Revolution; Independence of Mozambique; Mozambican Civil War begins
Rhodesian Bush War (1964–1979)	ZANU (ZANLA); ZAPU (ZIPRA); (People's Republic of Mozambique) Mozambique; ANC (MK); Zambia	Rhodesia (1964–1979); Zimbabwe Rhodesia (1979); Portugal (1964–1974) (Note: Portuguese forces assisted the Rhodesians in cross-border operations into Portuguese Mozambique. See Operation Flotilla and Operation Birch.); South Africa (from 1967)	Lancaster House Agreement: Rhodesia disestablished; Zimbabwe gains internationally recognised independence in its place.
Mozambican Civil War (1977–1992)	Mozambique (People's Republic until 1990): FRELIMO; UNAMO (1988–1992); ZANU (until 1979); Zimbabwe (from 1980); Soviet Union; Tanzania; Malawi (from 1987)	RENAMO; PRM (until 1982); UNAMO (1987–1988); COREMO; UNIPOMO; FUMO; Rhodesia (until 1979): Flechas; South Africa (from 1978)	Stalemate: Rome General Peace Accords, multiparty elections in 1994
Uganda–Tanzania War (1978–1979)	Tanzania; Uganda National Liberation Front: Kikosi Maalum; Front for National Salvation; Save Uganda Movement; Others; Mozambique	Uganda; Libya; Palestine Liberation Organization	Tanzanian victory: Collapse of the Second Republic of Uganda
RENAMO Insurgency (2013–2021)	Mozambique	RENAMO (until 2019); RENAMO Military Junta (from 2019)	The Peace agreement was signed between opposing factions on 1 August 2019: Most RENAMO rebels lay down arms soon afterward; A splinter faction, the RENAMO Military Junta (RMJ), continued its insurgency until 2021
Insurgency in Cabo Delgado (2017– present)	Mozambique; Rwanda (from 2021); Southern African Development Community (from 2021); South Africa; Botswana; Lesotho; Tanzania; Angola; Zambia; Malawi; DRC; Namibia	Ansar al-Sunna; Islamic State Bandits	Ongoing (Map of the current military situation): Mozambican and Rwandan troops launch counteroffensive, taking back many towns and cities
