= Islamic State – Mozambique Province =

Branch of the Islamic State

- Leader: Abu Yasir Hassan
- Dates active: May 2022 – Present (Note: Factions of ISIS operated in Mozambique even before the creation of their own province.)
- Split from: Islamic State – Central Africa Province
- Group: (Islamic State) Al-Shabaab (Mozambique)
- Ideology: Daeshism
- Part of: Islamic State
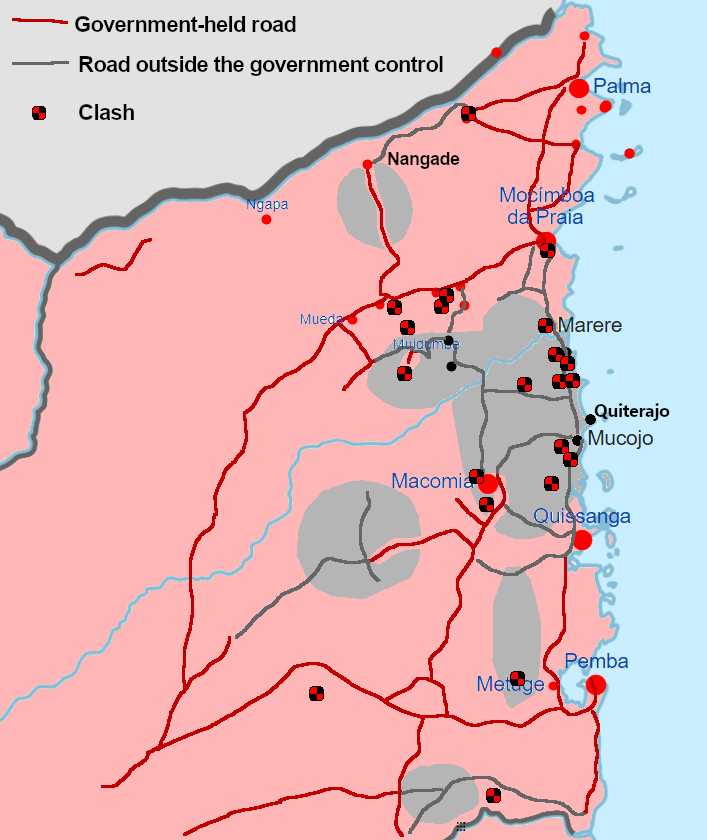
- ISMP territory in grey.

The Islamic State – Mozambique Province (ISMP) is an administrative division of the Islamic State (IS), a Salafi jihadist militant group. ISMP was established in May 2022 after splitting from the Islamic State – Central Africa Province, ISMP operates primarily in Mozambique's Cabo Delgado Province and to a lesser extent the Niassa Province and Nampula Province.

== Background ==
Since May 2022, the Congolese and Mozambican branches were recognized by IS central command as autonomous units within its network. IS-Central officially separated the Mozambican wing from IS-CAP, naming it the "Islamic State – Mozambique Province". The Congolese and Mozambican IS forces continued to maintain links after this split, but also began to "feud" with each other over the distribution of money and communications hierarchies within the IS global network.
