= Dyck Advisory Group =

Private military company

Dyck Advisory Group (DAG) is a private military company based in Velddrif, South Africa, founded in 2012 by Lionel Dyck, an ex-military colonel who had served in the Rhodesian Security Forces and then the Zimbabwe Defence Forces. He fought as part of the Zimbabwean intervention force that assisted the Mozambican government against RENAMO during the Mozambican Civil War. At the time, he forged good relations in the Mozambican governing party FRELIMO and with later Zimbabwean President Emmerson Mnangagwa. Following the Mozambican Civil War, he remained in the country.

DAG provides demining and anti-poaching services to customers around the world. From 2019, DAG became active in Cabo Delgado, Mozambique, where they helped to fight a local Islamist insurgency. The company was hired by police chief Bernardino Rafael to help train local policemen and fight the rebels. Its troops operate and charter out several Bat Hawk light aircraft, and have deployed three Aérospatiale Gazelles, two Eurocopter AS350 Écureuils and one Aérospatiale Alouette III in Cabo Delgado.

In 2021, Amnesty International (AI) reported that during operations in Mozambique, DAG's operatives fired machine guns from helicopters and dropped hand grenades indiscriminately into crowds of people, as well as repeatedly firing at civilian infrastructure, including hospitals, schools and homes.

In the Battle of Palma of March and April 2021, the company assisted the Mozambican military and police forces in combating the attacking insurgents. According to Dyck, his operatives engaged several of the terrorists as well as rescued wounded policemen and trapped civilians. The rescue, conducted in part by the DAF, rescued white contractors before local black civilians, said AI.
