= Insurgency in Cabo Delgado =

Ongoing armed conflict in Mozambique

- Part of the war against the Islamic State, Islamic terrorism in Africa and the war on terror
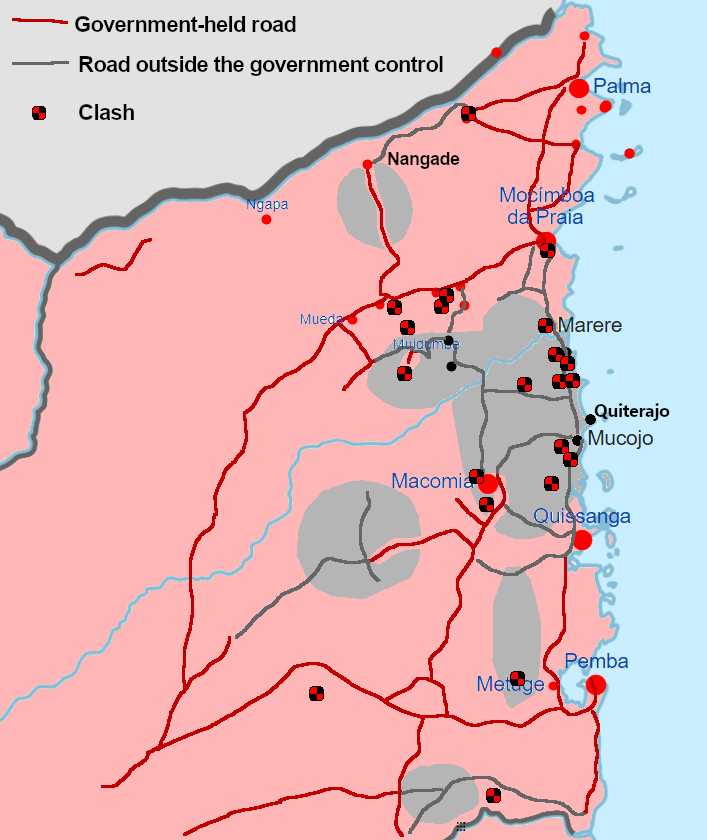
- Situation as of September 2025
Date	5 October 2017 – present (9 years, 1 month and 1 week)
Location	Cabo Delgado Province, Niassa Province and Nampula Province Mozambique, with spillovers into Tanzania 11°21′S 40°20′E
Status	Ongoing (Map of the current military situation)
Territorial changes	Mozambican and Rwandan troops launch counteroffensive, taking back many towns and cities

Belligerents
Mozambique; Rwanda (since 2021); Portugal; United States; United Kingdom; SADC (since 2021); South Africa; Botswana; Lesotho; Tanzania; Angola; Zambia; Malawi; DRC; Namibia; Naparama (since 2022)	Islamic State; (Islamic State) Al-Shabaab; Bandits

Commanders and leaders
Filipe Nyusi (2017–25); Daniel Chapo (since 2025); Atanasio M'tumuke; Bernadino Rafael; Paul Kagame; Cyril Ramaphosa; John Magufuli (2020–21); Samia Suluhu (since 2021) (Portugal) Nuno Lemos Pires (since 2021) "Recing" †	(Islamic State) Abu Yasir Hassan (Islamic State) Farido Selemane Arune (Islamic State) Abu Zainabo (Islamic State) Abu Munir (Islamic State) Mahamudo Ibrahim Dade (Islamic State) Rafael Mazubo (Islamic State) Abdala Likongo (Islamic State) Ibn Omar † (Islamic State) Abu Dardai Jongo; Abdul Rahmin Faizal (POW); Abdul Remane; Abdul Raim "Muhamudu" †; Nuno Remane; Sileimane Nguvo Toto; Abdul Aziz; Rajab Awadhi Ndanjile †; Twahili Mwidini †

Units involved
Mozambican security forces; Armed Forces (FADM); Police (UIR); PMCs; Wagner Group (until 2019); DAG (since 2019); Paramount Group; FSG; Various security companies and unidentified military contractors; Local self-defense groups; SAS forces; 60 Commandos and Portuguese Marine Corps (training support); Green Berets (training support)	Military of the Islamic State; IS-CAP (until 2022); ISMP (from 2022); Various Al-Shabaab cells; Mozambican ex-policemen and ex-frontier guards; Foreign Al-Shabaab mercenaries

Strength
(South Africa) 1,495 (Rwanda) 1,000 (Zimbabwe) 304 (Botswana) 296 (Portugal) 60 (Angola) 20 (United States) 12 200 Wagner personnel	200–300 (2025)

Casualties and losses
(Mozambique) Hundreds killed and hundreds wounded 12 Wagner personnel killed (Botswana) 2 killed (Tanzania) 2 killed (Rwanda) 4+ killed, several wounded (South Africa) 1 killed (Lesotho) 3 deaths (2 non-combat, 1 combat)	Hundreds killed and hundreds wounded 470+ arrested^{[a]}
- Total: 6,570 killed including 2,759 civilians (per ACLED); 1,500,000 displaced (as of August 2026)
- ^{a} 314 Mozambicans, 52 Tanzanians, 3 Ugandans, 1 Somali and 100 unknown.

The insurgency in Cabo Delgado is an ongoing Islamist insurgency in Cabo Delgado Province, Mozambique, mainly fought between militant Islamists and jihadists attempting to establish an Islamic state in the region, and Mozambican security forces. Civilians have been the main targets of terrorist attacks by Islamist militants. The main insurgent faction is Ansar al-Sunna, a native extremist faction with tenuous international connections. From mid-2018, the Islamic State's Central Africa Province has allegedly become active in northern Mozambique as well, and claimed its first attack against Mozambican security forces in June 2019. In addition, bandits have exploited the rebellion to carry out raids. As of 2020, the insurgency intensified, as in the first half of 2020 there were nearly as many attacks carried out as in the whole of 2019.

Ansar al-Sunna (English: "Supporters of the Tradition") is known locally as al-Shabaab but they are not formally related to the better known Somali al-Shabaab. Some of the militants are known to speak Portuguese, the official language of Mozambique, however others speak Kimwane, the local language, and Swahili, the lingua franca language spoken north of that area in the Great Lakes region. Reports also state that members are allegedly mostly Mozambicans from Mocimboa da Praia, Palma, and Macomia districts, but also include foreign nationals from Tanzania and Somalia.

== Background ==
Ansar al-Sunna, also known by its original name Ahlu Sunnah Wa-Jamo (translated: "adepts of the prophetic tradition"), was initially an Islamic religious movement in the northern districts of Cabo Delgado which first appeared around 2015. It was formed by followers of the radical Kenyan cleric Aboud Rogo, who was killed in 2012. Thereafter, some members of his movement settled down in Kibiti, Tanzania, before moving into Mozambique.

Ansar al-Sunna claims that Islam as practised in Mozambique has been corrupted and no longer follows the teachings of Muhammad. The movement's members consequently entered traditional mosques with weapons in order to threaten others to follow their own radical beliefs. The movement is also anti-Christian, anti-Animist, and anti-Western, and has tried to prevent people from attending hospitals or schools which it considers secular and anti-Islamic. This behavior alienated much of the local population instead of converting them to Ahlu Sunnah Wa-Jamo, so that the movement's members broke away and formed their own places of worship. Over time, the group became increasingly violent: it called an extreme form of Sharia to be implemented in the country, no longer recognized the Mozambican government, and started to form hidden camps in Macomia District, Mocímboa da Praia District, and Montepuez District. There, Ansar al-Sunna militants were trained by ex-policemen, and ex-frontier guards who had been fired and held grudges against the government. The movement also contacted other Islamist militants in East Africa, and reportedly hired trainers from Somalia, Tanzania, and Kenya. Some of the Ansar al-Sunna militants have also journeyed abroad to receive direct training by other militant groups.

The militants are not unified, but split into different cells which do not appear to coordinate their actions. By August 2018, the Mozambican police had identified six men as leaders of the militants in Cabo Delgado: Abdul Faizal, Abdul Raim, Abdul Remane, Ibn Omar, "Salimo", and Nuno Remane. Ansar al-Sunna funds itself through drug trafficking (primarily heroin), contraband, and ivory trade.

While religion does play a fundamental role in the conflict, analysts believe the most important factors in the insurgency are widespread social, economic, and political problems in Mozambique. Unemployment and especially youth unemployment are considered the main causes for locals to join the Islamist rebels. Increasing inequalities have led many young people to be easily attracted by such a radical movement, as Ansar al-Sunna promises that its form of Islam will act as "antidote" to the existing "corrupt, elitist rule". Most rebels belong to the Mwani and Makwa ethnic groups that are native to Cabo Delgado; civilians belonging to these peoples have expressed sympathy for the insurgents. In general, the province lacks infrastructure and the state is underrepresented, easing the spread of the insurgency.

In an interview to Aid to the Church in Need, in October 2024, the bishop of Pemba lamented what he described as a lack of solidarity with Cabo Delgado from the rest of the country. "Since I have been in Pemba, I have found it difficult to mark 4 October as Peace Day. The truth is that we should be celebrating it as Rome Peace Accords Day, because in Cabo Delgado peace does not exist. Cabo Delgado is part of Mozambique, therefore there is no peace in Mozambique. It is hard for me to listen to speeches where people say that we have peace, when there is no peace in the whole country. When I hear these speeches, I feel there is a certain lack of solidarity with the people of Cabo Delgado, as if this was their problem, and not the country's problem."

Speaking to Aid to the Church in Need in June 2025, the bishop of Tete, in Northwest Mozambique, said that Mozambique needs international help to solve the crisis in Cabo Delgado.

Pope Francis mentioned the conflict in Cabo Delgado on a number of occasions, and Pope Leo XIV mentioned it for the first time in August 2025.

== Timeline ==
=== 2017 ===
- On 5 October, a pre-dawn raid targeted 3 police stations in the town of Mocímboa da Praia. It was led by 30 armed members, who killed 17 people, including two police officers and a community leader. 14 of the perpetrators were captured. During this brief occupation of Mocímboa da Praia, the perpetrators stole firearms and ammunition and told residents that they reject state health and education, and refused to pay taxes. The group is said to be affiliated with Al-Shabaab, the Al Qaeda-affiliated Islamist extremist group situated and operating in mostly the southern regions of Somalia.
- On 10 October, police detained 52 suspects in relation to the attack on 5 October.
- On 21 October, a pre-dawn skirmish took place between the group and government forces in the fishing village of Maluku, approximately 30 kilometres (19 mi) from Mocímboa da Praia. As a result, many locals fled the village.
- On 22 October, further skirmishes occurred near Columbe village, about 16 kilometres (9.9 mi) south of an installation of Anadarko Petroleum.
- On 27 October 2017, the Mozambican police confirmed the arrest of 100 more members of the group, including foreigners, in relation to the attack on 5 October.
- On 24 November, in the northern Mozambican province of Cabo Delgado, the government ordered the closure of three mosques located in Pemba and in the neighbourhoods of Cariaco, Alto Gigone and Chiuba, which were believed to have a connection with Islamic fundamentalism.
- On 29 November, the group attacked the villages of Mitumbate and Maculo, injuring two and killing at least two people. The two deaths were by decapitation and death by burning. According to local authorities, the terrorists also destroyed a church and 27 homes.
- On 4 December, the district government of Moçímboa da Praia in northern Mozambique named two men, Nuro Adremane and Jafar Alawi, as suspected of organising the attacks by an armed group against the police in October. Both men were Mozambican nationals. The district government stated that both men studied Islam in Tanzania, Sudan and Saudi Arabia, where they allegedly also received military training.
- On 17 December, a successful assassination attempt was committed on the National Director of Reconnaissance of the Police Rapid Intervention Unit.
- On 26 December, Police Spokesman Inacio Dino announced the commencement of counter-insurgency operations in the forests surrounding Mutumbate, in Cabo Delgado province. Since the amnesty for surrendering expired, stated that 36 Tanzanian citizens would be targeted by the operations.
- On 29 December, the independent Mozambican newspaper "O Pais" reported that Mozambican paratroopers and marines attacked the village of Mitumbate via air and sea, regarding it as a stronghold for the insurgents. The aftermath of the attack left 50 dead, including women and children, and an unknown number injured.

=== 2018 ===
- On 3 January, Mozambican police announced that the attacks on 29 December were classified as acts of terrorism.
- On 13 January, a group of terrorists entered the town of Olumbi in the Palma district around 8pm and fired into a market and a government administrative building, killing 5.
- On 28 January, a video appeared on social media showing six Islamist extremists dressed in civilian clothing and appealing to Mozambicans to join them in the fight for the values of Islamic doctrine and to establish Islamic law. The video was in both Portuguese and Arabic.
- On 12 March, Radio Moçambique reported that an armed group attacked the village of Chitolo, burning down 50 homes and killing residents in the process.
- On 21 March, residents of the village of Manilha abandoned their homes after witnessing armed men carrying out attacks in the surrounding area on the banks of the river Quinhevo.
- On 20, 21 and 22 April the group attacked the villages of Diaca Velha, near the boundary with Nangade district as well as the village of Mangwaza in the Palma district. Looting houses, burning four houses and killing one person and taking three hostages. However pursuit operations were launched on 22 April by Mozambican security personnel capturing 30 jihadist in the process. Meanwhile, a South African newspaper reported that about 90 militants belonging to the Islamic State of Iraq and the Levant had infiltrated northern Mozambique, citing unnamed intelligence sources. The Mozambican government promptly denied this report as baseless. Nevertheless, the Africa Union reported in May that it had confirmed the presence of ISIL forces in Mozambique.
- On 27 May, ten people, including children, were beheaded in the village of Monjane in the Palma district of Cabo Delgado province. Locals attribute the violence to al-Shabaab, a terrorist group founded in 2015 (no relation to the Somali terrorist group al-Shabaab). Twelve days later, the U.S. Embassy in Mozambique warned American citizens to leave the district headquarters of Palma, citing a risk of another imminent attack.
- On 3 June, five civilians were decapitated in an attack on the village of Rueia in the Macomia district.
- On 5 June, six men armed with machetes and guns killed seven people and injured four others and set dozens of homes on fire in the village of Naunde in the Macomia district.
- On 6 June, at least six people were killed and two seriously injured when terrorists armed with knives and machetes attacked the village of Namaluco in the Quissanga district. The assailants also burned down a hundred houses.
- On 11 June, terrorists armed with machetes and firearms attacked the village of Changa in the Nangade district in the northern Mozambican province of Cabo Delgado, killing four people. The attackers also burned down several houses.
- On 12 June, a group of armed men attacked the village of Nathuko in the Macomia district in the Mozambican province of Cabo Delgado. The terrorists decapitated a villager, burned down several houses and killed all the animals.
- On 21 September, 12 people were killed, 15 injured, and 55 houses were burned by jihadists in the village of Paqueue in the province of Cabo Delgado. 10 of the victims were shot to death and 2 were burned to death, with at least one of the victims being decapitated post-mortum.
- On 3 November, suspected Ansar al Sunna insurgents looted houses and set on fire at least 45 houses in an isolated village in the Macomia District, no casualties were reported in the incident.
- On 7 December 30-year-old Mustafa Suale Machinga was captured by local residents and referred to authorities in Litingina village in Nangade District in Mozambique's Cabo Delgado province. Machinga a former member of the Mozambican armed forces was captured after being accused by residents of leading the group responsible for Islamist militant-inspired attacks in the zone.

=== 2019 ===
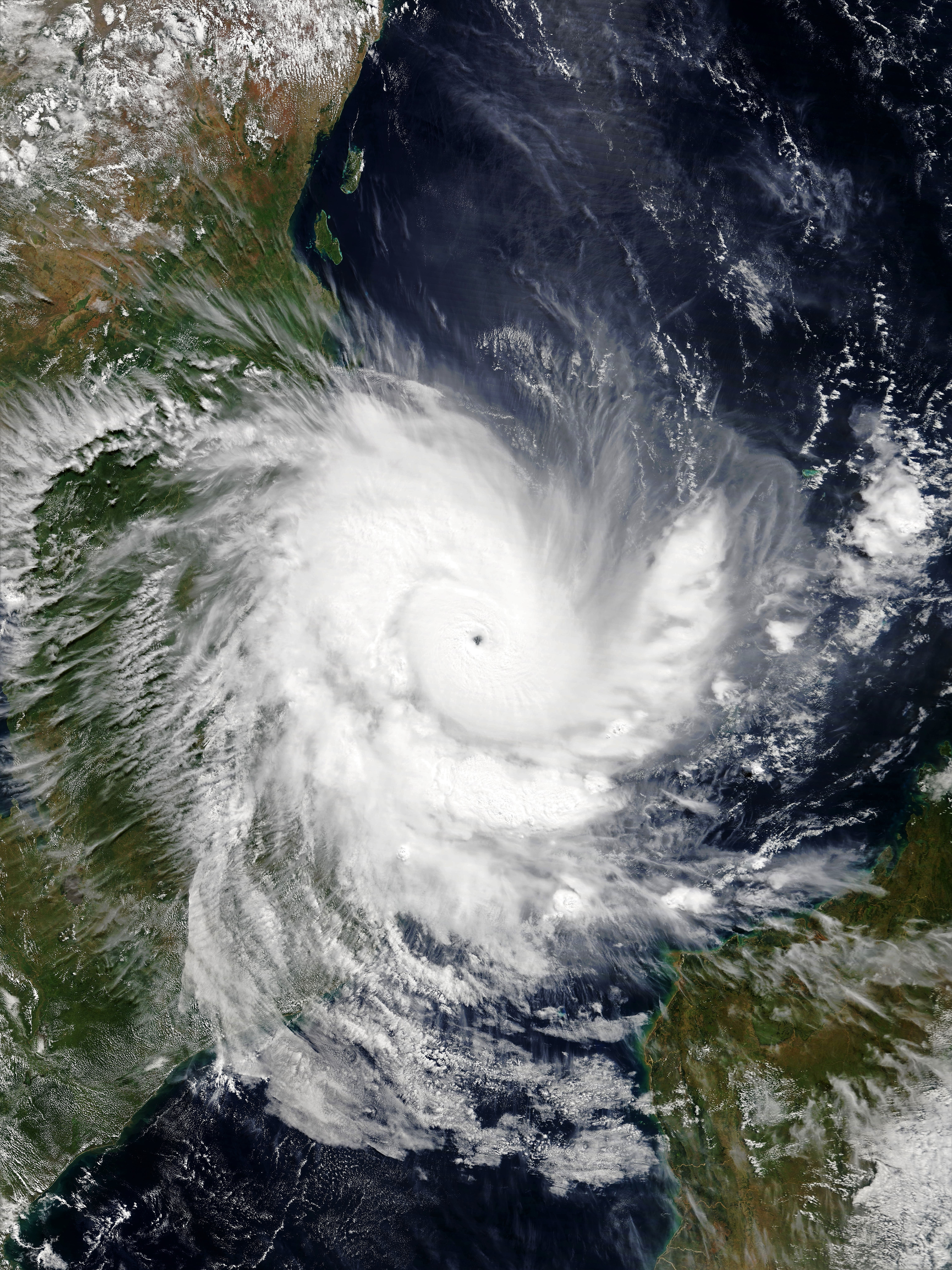
Satellite image of Cyclone Kenneth approaching Mozambique on 25 April 2019.

- Sometime in January or early February 2019, security forces captured Abdul Rahmin Faizal, a suspected insurgent leader of Ugandan nationality.
- On 8 February, Islamist fighters attacked Piqueue village in Cabo Delgado, killing and dismembering seven men, and kidnapping four women.
- After Cyclone Kenneth hit Mozambique on 25 April, resulting in much devastation, the rebels initially halted their attacks. On 3 May, however, they struck once again by destroying the village of Nacate, Macomia District, killing six civilians. In the following weeks, the Islamists increased their attacks, raiding and burning several villages such as Ntapuala and Banga-Vieja in Macomia District, as well as Ida and Ipho in Meluco District. They also carried out ambushes, and told locals to abandon their homes. At least two attacks targeted workers of Anadarko Petroleum, a United States-headquartered hydrocarbon exploration company.
- On 4 June, ISIL claimed that its "Central Africa Province" branch had carried out a successful attack on the Mozambican Army at Mitopy in the Mocímboa da Praia District. At least 16 people were killed and about 12 wounded during the attack. By this point, ISIL considered Ansar al-Sunna as one its affiliates, though how many Islamist rebels in Mozambique are actually loyal to ISIL remains unclear.
- On 3 July, an attack by Islamists in Nangade District killed seven people, including civilians and a policeman. On 6 July ISIL claimed responsibility for the attack.
- On 25 September, Russian military hardware, namely two Mi-17 helicopters, was delivered via a Russian Air Force An-124 (registration RA-82038) transport aeroplane which landed at Nacala. The Russian and Mozambican governments had previously signed an agreement on military and technical cooperation in late January 2017.
- In early October, the Mozambican military launched several counter-insurgency operations with the support of Russian mercenaries and defense contractors from the Wagner Group. The rebels were pushed back in many areas of Cabo Delgado, and forced to retreat into the woods. In addition, 34 individuals were detained while traveling from Nampula to Cabo Delgado in order to join the ISIL-affiliated insurgent group. The rebels retaliated by killing seven Russian mercenaries as well as 20 Mozambican soldiers during two ambushes. The attacks were attributed to the Islamic State's Central Africa Province.
- In November, a number of government troops and 5 fighters from the Wagner Group were killed in an ambush, with ISIL claiming responsibility for the attack. A number of Wagner fighters were said to have been killed in friendly fire incidents and Wagner fighters retreated from some areas, reportedly causing a breakdown in trust with Mozambique forces.

=== 2020 ===
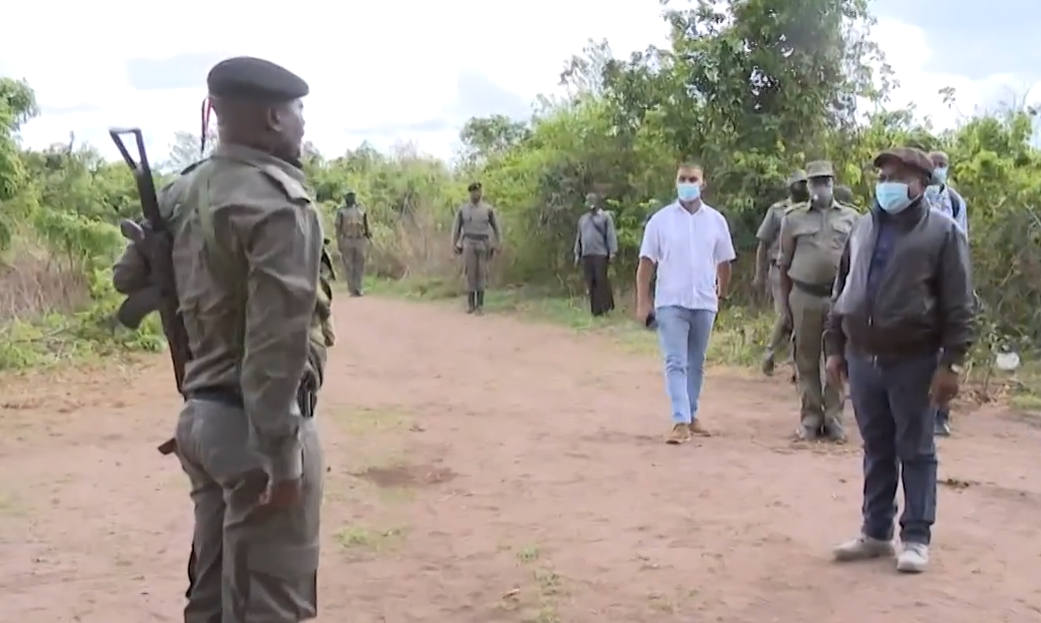
President Filipe Nyusi visits Mozambican troops in Cabo Delgado, October 2020

- March: the Wagner Group withdraws from Mozambique, with its counterinsurgency operation being considered a failure.
- 23 March: Mocímboa da Praia was captured by Islamist militants in a coordinated attack from land and sea. The rebels destroyed government buildings and raised a Jihadist flag, but refrained from targeting civilians. Instead, the insurgents distributed food and looted goods to the locals, and withdrew from the city later that day.
- 25 March: rebels raided the capital of Quissanga District, followed by several more villages.
- 7 April: militants killed 52 villagers in Xitaxi village, who refused to join them. Islamic State's Central Africa Province was regarded as responsible for the massacre. On the same day, Mozambican security forces reportedly killed 39 militants during an attempted attack on Muidumbe village. Meanwhile, several local rebels declared their intention to establish a caliphate in northern Mozambique.
- 10 April: security forces allegedly killed 59 rebels during a clash on the Quirimbas Islands.
- 11–13 April: Mozambican security forces reportedly killed 31 insurgents during operations on Ibo island.
- 24 April: the Mozambican government admitted for the first time that Islamic State followers were active in the country and involved in the insurgency.
- 14 May: Mozambican Interior Minister Amade Miquidade claims that the government forces had killed 50 insurgents in separate incidents in the northern part of Cabo Delgado Province.
- 28 May: around 90 Islamist fighters attacked the town of Macomia and raised the black standard flag.
- June: South African SANDF special forces had become active in Mozambique, assisting local security forces against the local rebels.
- 1 June: Government forces recaptured Macomia killing two jihadist leaders.
- 27 June: Mocímboa da Praia was again captured by Islamist militants, with IS-CAP claiming to be responsible. Many local civilians consequently fled the town. On the same day, other rebels ambushed workers belonging to Fenix Constructions Service Lda, a private construction firm subcontracted by oil and gas company Total S.A., killing at least eight employees.
- 30 June: Government forces recaptured Mocímboa da Praia.
- 25 July: Islamic State-aligned militants killed two civilians in Chai village near Macomia.
- 26 July: Government forces recaptured Chai.
- 9 August: Insurgents captured Awasse.
- 11 August: ISCAP rebels once again took control of Mocímboa da Praia after a several days-long offensive which resulted in the death of over one hundred Mozambican troops.
- 13 August: A refugee ship coming from Nkomangano was shot at by Government forces, sinking it, killing 40 civilians.
- 8 September: Insurgents captured two islands, Mecungo and Vamizi, killing one person. The rebels evicted all locals from the islands, and declared them part of their territory. In addition, the ISIL forces declared Mocímboa da Praia the capital of their province.
- 24 September: Mozambican soldiers repelled an insurgent attack against the village of Bilibiza.
- 26 September:
  - Mozambique requests assistance from the European Union (EU) in combating the insurgency.
  - Mozambique claims to be in control of Mocimboa da Praia, despite not having a physical presence in the city. In addition, the tourist island of Vamizi is reported to have been recaptured by Mozambican forces, and 50 soldiers are reportedly stationed there.
- 29 September: Mozambican authorities report that four insurgent attacks were launched against the villages of Chai, Mucojo, Bilibiza, and Cagembe, killing over a dozen people. The militants also attacked a security post in Naliendele, killing several civilians and two Mozambican soldiers.
- 30 September:
  - The United States reportedly requests Zimbabwe to assist Mozambique in combating the insurgency in Cabo Delgado, despite having previously imposed sanctions.
- 30 September–6 October: Insurgents took control of Mucojo administrative post and several villages. Local population fled.
- Sometime in October, ISCA militants raid an army base in Kitaya village, Tanzania, capturing a Kalashnikov rifle and a Galil ACE 21 equipped with a night vision scope. A Chinese WZ-551 APC was also destroyed.
- 14 October: In the first heavy attack outside Mozambique by local terrorists, hundreds of Islamic State and Ansar-al-Sunna members attack a village in Mtwara, Tanzania, killing 20 civilians and damaging properties.
- 15–17 October: Mozambican security forces claim to have recaptured the region of Awasse and killed over 270 ISCAP insurgents without suffering any casualties of their own. Seven truckloads of weaponry as well as several militants were reported captured. However no proof has been provided and this claim has been disputed by others.
- 22 October: The EU agrees to assist Mozambique in combating the insurgency in Cabo Delgado.
- 28 October: The Mozambican government reports that the army has captured several insurgent hideouts in the woods and are advancing on a major insurgent base, nicknamed "Syria", in Cabo Delgado.
- 30 October: A refugee ship carrying 74 refugees capsized near Ilha Makalowe killing 54 people.
- 1 November: Islamists captured Muidumbe.
- 6 November: Militants are reported to have beheaded over 50 people in an attack on Muatide village.
- 11 November: Local media in Mozambique reports that Islamist rebels captured nine towns over the previous two weeks. They were also advancing on the strategically significant town of Mueda.
- 12 November: Mozambican authorities detain 12 Iraqi nationals for supposed links to Islamist insurgents after discovering numerous weapons and other equipment in their possession.
- 14 November: The United Nations Human Rights Commissioner, Michelle Bachelet, calls for an international response to the Cabo Delgado insurgency.
- 17 November: ISIL insurgents reportedly threatened to attack the town of Mueda, warning all residents to evacuate the area by 20 November. In addition, the UN's migration agency reports that 33,000 people have been displaced in just one week due to the insurgency.
- 19 November: Over 1,000 Mozambican troops recaptured Muidumbe District, killing 16 militants.
- 22 November: Mozambique and Tanzania announce the launch of a joint military operation against Islamic insurgents in Cabo Delgado.
- 26 November: Insurgents once again captured Namacande, Muidumbe district capital, and Muatide.
- 2 December: President Nyusi meets with several US counter-terrorism officials to discuss combating the insurgency in Cabo Delgado
- 3 December: Malawi's president announces that troops from the Malawian Defence Force will be sent to Mozambique to assist in anti-insurgent operations.
- 4 December: Militants ambush a convoy of Mozambican troops in the village of Muidumbe, killing 25 soldiers in an intense firefight before retreating into the woods.
- 8 December: Government forces have claimed to have recaptured Quissanga village.
- 12 December: Insurgents went on a shooting spree through Nangade district. Traveling by motorbike, the attackers killed 14 civilians and destroyed four vehicles across the villages of Namiune, 25 de Setembro, Naleke, Chicuaia Nova, Litingina, and Lukuamba.
- 15 December: Government forces attacked Awasse but were forced to retreat by insurgents.
- 29 December: ISCAP militants attacked the village of Monjane, forcing the local population to flee the area.

=== 2021 ===
- 7 January: ISCAP militants attacked the coastal village of Olumboa, Macomia district. There, they captured 13 civilians. Of those captured, two escaped and at least seven were beheaded by the insurgents.
- 16 January: A football team travelling from Mueda to Palma were ambushed by insurgents, leaving 5 people dead. On the same day, government forces launched an offensive operation in Ntuleni, Palma district, killing an unknown number of insurgents, who were also using civilians as human shields.
- 19 January: Insurgents attacked a vehicle transporting cans of gasoline to Palma as it made its way through Pundanhar, Palma district. Some passengers managed to flee. Insurgents killed three civilians and burned the car.
- 21 January: A small group of insurgents raided the village of Namiune, Nangade district. They beat and then beheaded a village leader and kidnapped four boys aged between 10 and 12.
- Also on 21 January: IS insurgents attacked the town of Mandimba, occupying the town until 26 January. Whilst in the town, insurgents reportedly killed 1 civilian and 2 policemen in addition to looting the town. During the occupation, militants killed 3 civilians the town of Namiune.
- 30 January: On 30 January, militants attacked the village of Nkonga, Nangade district, just west of the border with Mocimboa da Praia. No casualties have yet been reported from the attack, but insurgents stole food and burned homes in the village. Insurgents also returned the next day and renewed their assault.
- Late January: There were clashes between government-backed militias and IS militants in Panjele, Mocimboa da Praia district, leading to the deaths of 3 government-backed militiamen and an unknown number of insurgents.
- Mid February: state newspaper Notícias reported that only 6,294 young people from Cabo Delgado have been conscripted into the military in the current conscription period, which runs from the beginning of January to the end of February. The military's target was to sign up 14,952 new soldiers from the province.
- 19 February: insurgents attacked the village of Quionga in northern Palma district near the Tanzanian border. According to a source quoted by Pinnacle News, 30 insurgents were involved in the attack and the raiders remained in the town until the next morning. Insurgents killed four people in Quionga, burned homes — including that of the head of the Quionga administrative post — and looted food in the village.
- 22 February: Militants attacked Ingalonga, Nangade district, beheading at least 2 people. On the same day, insurgents also attacked Mitope, Mocimboa da Praia district, beheading 3 men and taking 3 women hostage, one of which was later released.
- 25 February: insurgents attacked the village of Luneque, Nangade district, killing at least 4 civilians and forcing several others to flee.
- 26 February: insurgents attacked Quirinde, Palma district, killing 7 people, 3 of which were beheaded.
- 1 March: insurgents began to set up road blocks between Nangade and Mueda. Insurgents also killed 2 civilian farmers near the village of Eduardo Mondlane, east of Litingina.
- 3 March: insurgents ambushed a military vehicle travelling from Nangade to Mueda. The attack left one lieutenant colonel dead and two other Mozambican soldiers dead. Insurgents also raided the village of N'gangolo, killing 2 civilians.
- 10 March: 8 insurgents were killed by Mozambican militia in Nangade district.
- 16 March: Save The Children has reported that children as young as 11 have been beheaded.
- Mid March: The town of Palma is effectively besieged by insurgents via cutting off supply lines most notably food supplies. Mozambican authorities used air transport to fly in supplies to the town.
- Late March: The United States deployed the Green Berets special forces to train the Mozambican marines.
- Since 24 March, ISIL militants conducted a major attack on the town of Palma, following a loss of communication from the town. Militants first attacked the police station and then proceeded to rob the town's banks. A military source in Palma claimed 'government forces resisted but then had to flee' as the militants were using 'heavy weapons that they had not seen before'. Residential buildings were attacked too, resulting in the death of many civilians. On 27 March, the fourth day of the siege in the town, several more people were killed by the terrorists. Civilians were killed in the streets and in their houses; some of the victims were beheaded. A gas project was attacked too, and workers were murdered. About 200 foreign nationals fled to a local hotel to protect themselves, but the place was assaulted by the militants. A convoy conducted by Mozambican soldiers arrived at the scene to rescue the foreigners, but it came under fire. A South African man and a British civil contractor were confirmed killed in that attack, alongside 21 responding soldiers and several more people whose identity is unknown so far.

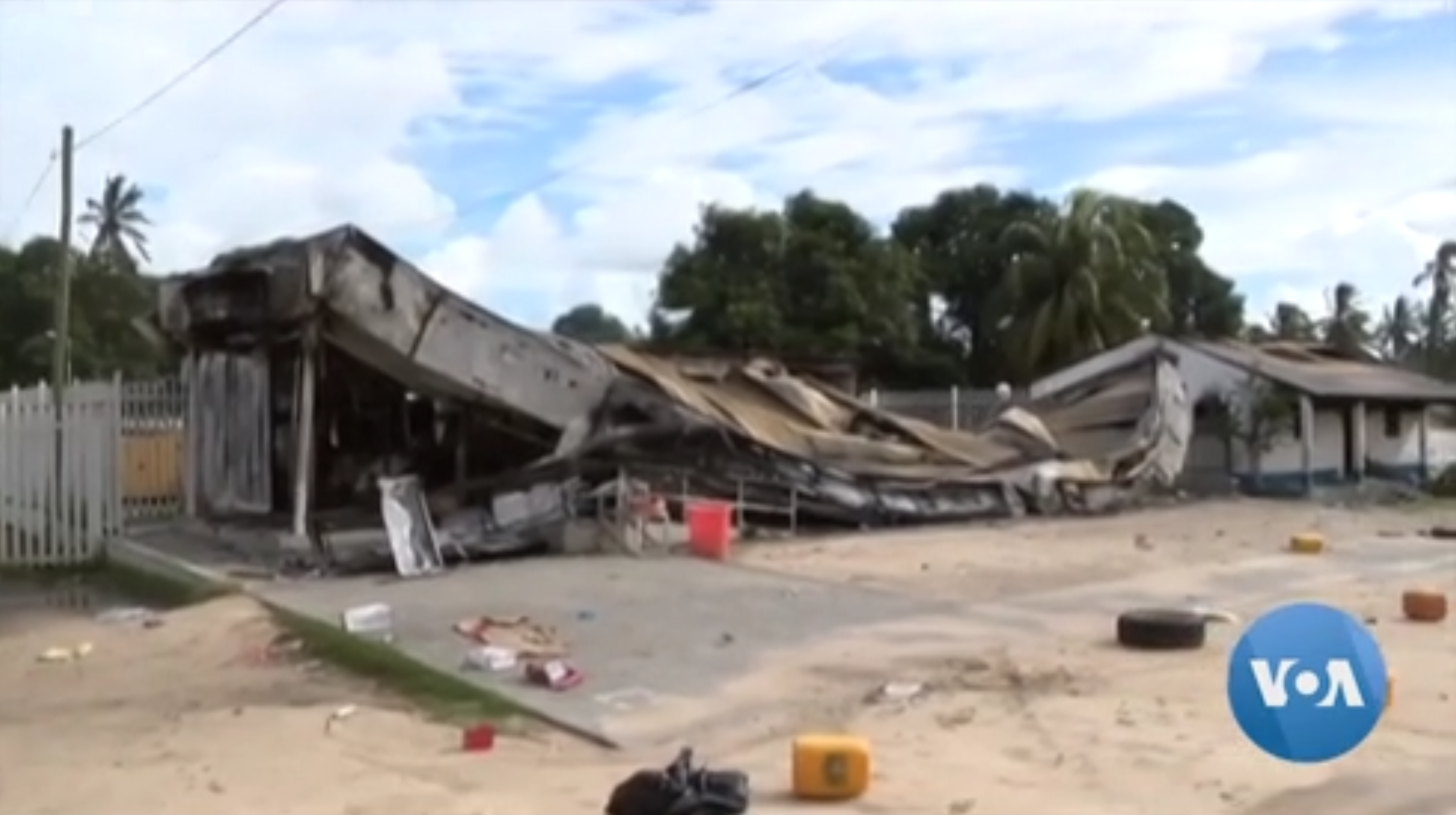
One of the buildings destroyed during the battle of Palma

- 5 April: Mozambican forces recapture Palma, though most of the town is destroyed in the fighting. Insurgents still remain in the outskirts and fighting still continues.
- 8 April: Seven insurgents entered the village of Novo Cabo Delgado, in northwestern Macomia district. They looted food and other goods from the village. As they left, they were ambushed by members of a local militia. In the ensuing firefight, militia members killed three insurgents. One militia member was killed and another wounded.
- 11 April: A displaced civilian was found beheaded in his house in Palma, after discovering a large cache of food the previous day.
- 19 April: Civilians discovered the bodies of 3 young men in Palma, addressing they'd been killed by Mozambican troops who were sweeping the town for insurgents.
- 22 April: A taxi driver was killed by Mozambican soldiers in Pemba after a misunderstanding that led the soldiers to believe the taxi driver was an insurgent.
- 23 April: 5 civilians were killed and 7 homes were burned down after insurgents attacked a district of Palma.
- 30 April: Reports of fresh clashes between Mozambican troops and insurgents in Palma began to surface after insurgents burnt more buildings in the town, in the days prior, in an attempt to force Mozambican troops out. The phone service was once again cut off from the town, making communication difficult. Insurgents were also spotted in Quiuia, north of Palma. On the same day, 5 fisherman were beheaded by insurgents near the town of Pangane.
- 3 May: 7 displaced civilians from Palma were killed and several more were killed after insurgents sunk two boats carrying displaced people off the coast of Ilha Mucongwe.
- 7 May: 5 insurgents were killed by a local militia after insurgents launched a failed attack on Ngalonga, in southeastern Nangade district.
- 15 May: Insurgents in Quifula Island in the Quirimba Islands (Ibo, Cabo Delgado) killed a fisherman.
- 21 May: Government forces reportedly recaptured Diaca and Namacunde.
- 22 May: There was fighting between government forces and insurgents in lower Palma, insurgents burned down 14 homes and a mosque in lower Palma. There has been no confirmation on casualties.
- 4 June: Government forces repelled insurgent attack on Namacunde.
- 12 June:
  - A group of self-appointed vigilantes tried to confront some remaining insurgents with machetes in north Palma. Upon reaching the insurgents, 3 of the vigilantes were shot dead.
  - 7 civilians were beheaded in the fields outside the village of Litamanda, in northern Macomia district. Local militia stated Mozambican troops were responsible after Mozambican soldiers were seen with blood on their clothes nearby. The militia also stated they looted the civilians' property and beheaded them to make it look like it was the result of an insurgent attack.
- 15 June: 7 dead civilians were discovered near Novo Cabo Delgado, Macomia district. It is unclear who it was that killed them.
- 16 June: IS militants asked for a ransom of 1 million US dollars for the safe return of Indian citizen and businessman, Vinod Beniwal, who was abducted by IS during the Battle of Palma, in March 2021.
- 17 June: Mozambican troops raided the village of Quitunda, just south of Palma. The troops ransacked the town and looted property of civilians.
- 19 June: Insurgents attacked the village of Nova Cabo Delgado, looting the village and killing 8 civilians. Once they left the town, they were ambushed by a local militia. 5 insurgents were killed in the shootout.
- 23 June: ISIS attacked positions of the Mozambican army in Patacua, just south of Quitunda in Palma district. At least one Mozambican soldier was killed and several weapons were captured by the militants. The IS-linked Amaq News Agency claimed the attack resulted in the deaths of 15 Mozambican soldiers.
- Late June: Skirmishes between insurgents and Mozambican forces continued in Palma, forcing Mozambican forces to abandon one of their barracks'.
- 2 July: Insurgents attacked the village of Namande, killing 7 civilians and 3 Mozambican militiamen. Also of 2 July, ISIS operatives attacked the town of Diaca, killing one Mozambican policeman and capturing two police armoured personnel carriers.

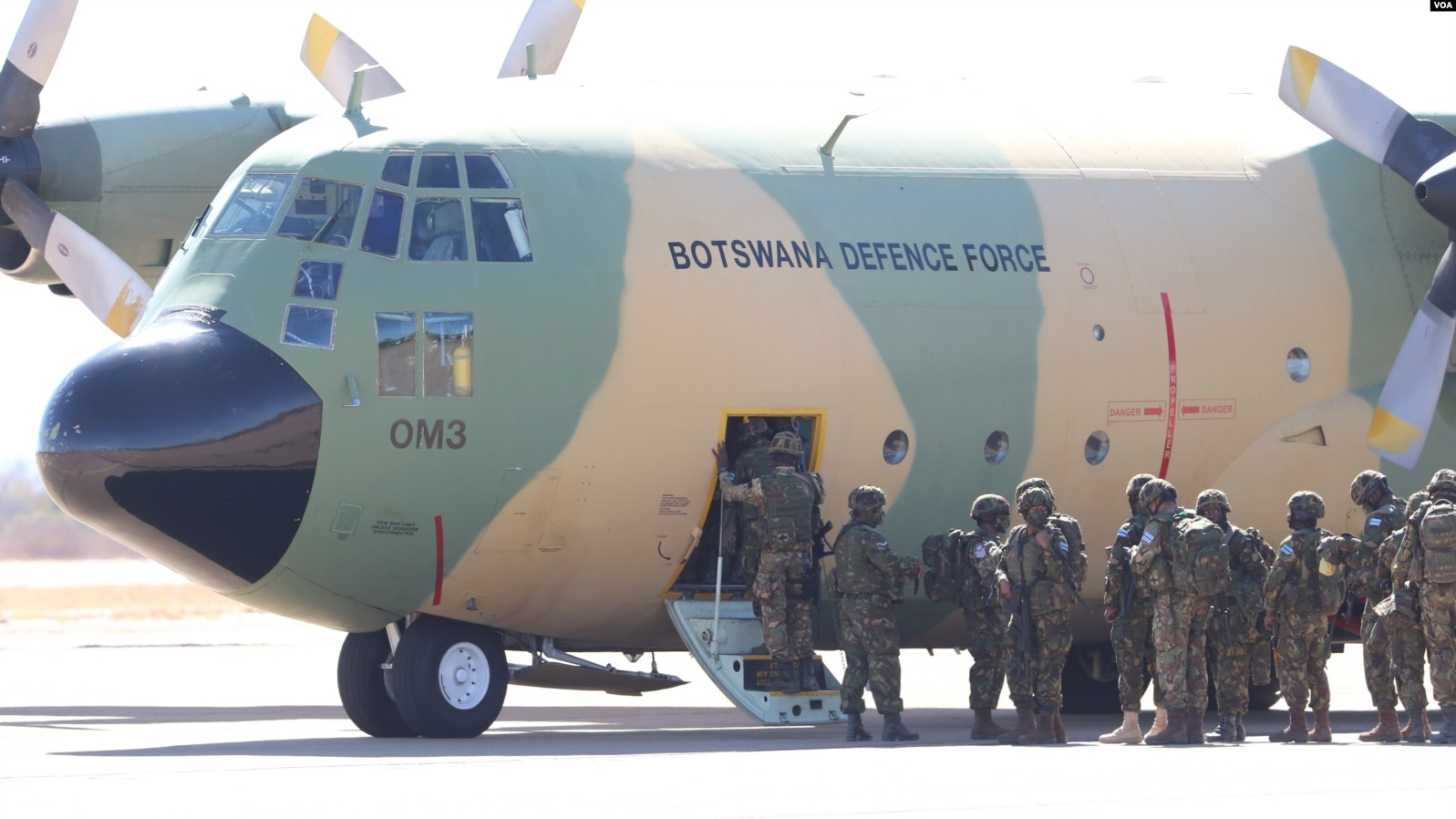
Botswana soldiers board a Botswana Defence Force plane to Mozambique, July 2021

- 10 July: 9 women displaced by the fighting near Palma drowned after their boats capsized near the island of Ilha Vamize.
- 13 July: Mozambican troops executed 15 suspected insurgents that had been attempting to cross into Tanzania. It is unclear if the personnel executed were insurgents.
- 14 July: ISIS claim an attack on the village of Ncumbi, in which 4 civilians were killed.
- 15 July:
  - Insurgents attacked the village of Congresso, north of Macomia town. Six civilians were killed in the attack.
  - Southern African Development Community deploys the Southern African Development Community Mission in Mozambique (SAMIM) force.
- Mid July: Rwandan troops were now being deployed in Cabo Delagado province amid reports that the Mozambican army was preparing to launch a coastal invasion on the insurgent held areas of the province.
- 17 July: Insurgents attacked the village of Mitope, in the northwest of Mocimboa da Praia district. One civilian was beheaded in the attack. On the same day, insurgents attacked the village of Nampanha, Muidumbe district, killing two civilians.
- 18 July: ISIL operatives attacked the village of Mandava, engaging with Mozambican militia, killing 2 of them.
- 19 July: Insurgents attacked the village of Namande, killing 3 civilians. Two more civilians were also killed in an attack on Nampanha. On the same day, a ship carrying supplies to displaced people in Pemba was shipwrecked on the Mozambican coast, killing 12 civilians.
- 20 July: Rwandan troops and insurgents clashed in the village of Quionga, north of Palma. 30 insurgents were allegedly killed in the clashes.
- 24 July: Rwandan troops killed 4 insurgents in skirmish in the town of Awasse. Rwandan casualties are unknown.
- 26 July: Government forces recaptured Awasse. Three insurgents were reportedly killed and one Rwandan soldier was injured.
- 28 July: ISIL claims an attack on Mozambican militia near Nampanha, killing 2 militiamen.
- 30 July: Zimbabwe announces they are sending 304 'defence instructors' to help train and provide support for Mozambican troops in the insurgency.
- 31 July: ISIL claim an attack on Mozambican positions in Mandava, killing at least one Mozambican army officer. Clashes were also reported to have taken place through to 1 August.
- From July to 4 August, Mozambican and allied forces had captured the settlements of Chinda, Mumu, Mbau, Zambia, Mapalanganha, Maputo, Tete, Njama and Quelimane from insurgents.
- 8 August: Rwandan and Mozambican forces retook the city of Mocímboa da Praia, after clashed with a small number of insurgents. Most of the town had been abandoned by insurgents prior to the offensive. Casualties are unknown.
- 18 August: Government forces recaptured Marere south of Mocimboa da Praia.
- 20 August: Government forces recaptured Mbau, killing 11 militiamen.
- 24 August: 10 fishermen were beheaded by insurgents in Mucojo.
- 27 August: Government forces occupied insurgent base in Ntchinga in Muidumbe.
- 31 August: 3 civilians were killed and dismembered in Quissanga during a suspected insurgent attack.
- 12 September: an IED was detonated, targeting a Rwandan military convoy, causing material damage only.
- 13 September: clashes between insurgents and Mozambican forces were reported in the Messalo river valley.
- 16 September: 5 civilians were killed by insurgents for brewing alcohol in Namaluco, Quissanga district.
- 20 September: Insurgents attacked the villages of Bilibiza, Nacuta, and Tapara, killing at least 17 civilians. 15 insurgents arrived in the village of Kagera, in Tanzania, killing at least one shopkeeper. One source says that 3 civilians were beheaded for failing to recite the Shahada.
- 22 September: Mozambican forces attacked an insurgent camp in a rural area near Quiterajo, Macomia district, killing 5 insurgents.
- 23 September: 2 buses carrying Mozambican soldiers were attacked, resulting in the death of at least one person.
- 24 September: A report from the SADC Mission in Mozambique (SAMIM) reported that a Tanzanian soldier and 17 insurgents were killed in an attack on an insurgent base near Chitama, in southeastern Nangade district. On the same day, ISIS claimed responsibility for an attack in Lucuamba in which they beheaded two civilians and set fire to several houses in the village.
- 25 September: A report from SAMIM stated that Mozambican killed Rajab Awadhi Ndanjile, one of the founders of the insurgency in Litingina during an attack on an insurgent base in Chitama.
- 26 September: 4 insurgents were killed near Mucojo by Mozambican security forces.
- 28 September: Insurgents attacked the village of Litiminha, Mueda district, and beheaded 7 civilians. Mozabican troops responded to the insurgent attack, killing 5 of them.
- 1 October: Insurgents attacked Quitico, near Olumbe in southern Palma district. The attack killed 3 civilians, the Mozambican military surrounded the insurgents after the attack and killed all 7 of the insurgent group. On the same day, a group of 12 insurgents attacked the Tanzanian village of Kiwengulo, killing one civilian and stealing food.
- 7 October: Mozambican militiamen executed 4 men in Muatide, Muidumbe district, on suspicion of being members of the insurgency.

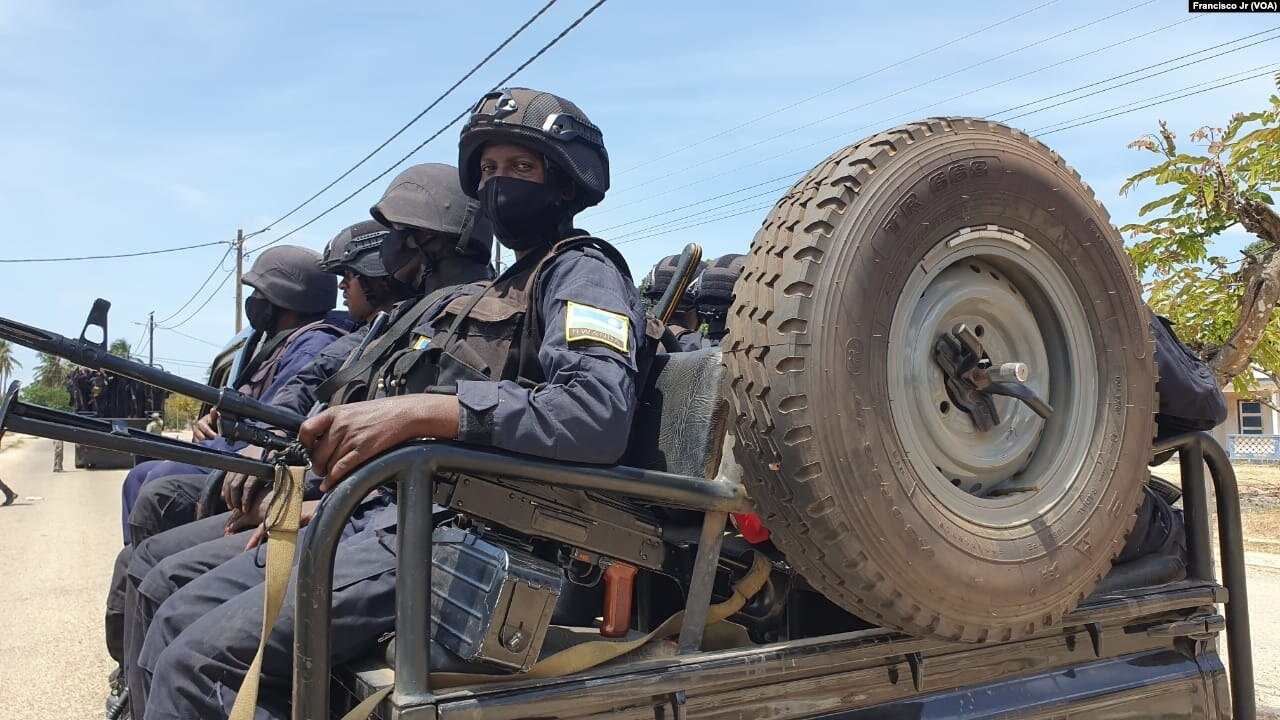
Rwandan forces in Mocimboa da Praia, October 2021

- 22 October: Insurgents attacked Lumumua near Mucojo and beheaded two civilians.
- 24 October: ISIS militants attacked Chitama village, Nangade district killing 3 people, including two Mozambican Militiamen and a community leader.
- 26 October: Mozambican forces killed at least 10 fisherman in the village of Pangane after they were caught violating a supposed ban on maritime activity north of Ilha Matemo.
- 3 November: The European Union Training Mission in Mozambique is launched. It will train Quick Reaction Forces to deal with the Cabo Delgado insurgent threat.
- 7 November: Insurgents attacked the village of Ntuleni, killing one person and stealing food supplies.
- 9 November: Mozambican forces ambushed a group of insurgents in the forest near the village of Samora Machel, also in Nangade district, killing 3 of them. On the same day 4 insurgents were killed in a clash with Mozambican forces at Mandimba, in eastern Nangade district.
- 10 November: Islamic State (IS) insurgents killed a man in the village of 5º Congresso in northern Macomia district claiming he was a spy for the Mozambican government. The insurgents were later ambushed by militiamen near Chai shortly after the attack, six insurgents and one Mozambican soldier were killed in the clash.
- 12 November: IS claimed responsibility for capturing and beheading 3 Mozambican soldiers in Namatil, Mueda district.
- 13 November: IS claim responsibility for killing 7 Mozambican soldiers after insurgents ambushed an army patrol in the village of Neida. On the same day, the village of Nanjaba was attacked by a group of 30 insurgents, burning 17 houses and killing 3 people. On the same day, suspected insurgents killed a taxi driver with a machete and stole his motorcycle.
- 14 November: IS released photos of them beheading two 'spies' they accused of working with Mozambican security forces in Ngapa.
- 16 November: IS insurgents established a new base in Nambungal after a period of fighting took place between them and Mozambican forces, resulting in the deaths of 4 Mozambican militiamen.
- 18 November: Mozambican forces overran an insurgent base Ninga, in southern Nangade district, killing at least 2 insurgents. On the same day, 9 insurgents were also killed after fighting took place in Macomia district.
- 21 November: Mozambican militiamen fought off an insurgent attack near Mueda town. No casualties were reported in the fighting.
- 25 November: The insurgency spread to the Mozambican province of Niassa after a group of insurgents attacked the village of Gomba, killing at least one Mozambican police officer.
- 27 November: IS claimed responsibility for an attack on the village of Naulala, also in Niassa province. The village was raided of its health supplies and two houses were burnt down.
- 29 November: IS operatives attacked the village of Chitoio, in Macomia district, killed two civilians and then attacked the village of Chai, claiming that the Mozambican forces stationed in the village fled from their positions.
- 30 November: Insurgents attacked the village of Macananje, 20 kilometers from the capital of Mecula district, Niassa province, wounding a member of the Mozambican security forces.
- 3 December: IS militants attacked the village of Nova Zambezia, Macomia district, beheading one civilian that IS claimed was a Mozambican soldier.
- 6 December: 4 insurgents were killed by Mozambican militiamen during a firefight in the village of Nkoe, Macomia district.
- 8 December: Insurgents attacked the village of Lichengue, in the Mecula district of Niassa province, burning down several houses and killing at least one civilian. ISIS later claimed responsibility for the attack. On the same day ISIS also claimed responsibility for an attack on Chimene, that left one civilian dead.
- 10 December: Insurgents attacked Kiwengulo, a village in Tanzania's Mtwara region, killing 4 civilians. Tanzanian forces responded to the attack and killed 5 insurgents. A Tanzanian military vehicle was also destroyed in the clash.
- 19 December: It was reported that ISIS insurgents beheaded a Christian Pastor in the Nova Zambezia area, gave his severed head to his wife and 'ordered her to inform the authorities'.
- 19 December: Mozambique's defence minister claimed Mozambican and SAMIM soldiers killed ten insurgents after storming an ISIS camp in Cabo Delgado.
- 20 December: A patrol consisting of South African Special Forces and Mozambican ground troops were ambushed by ISIS east of Chai village. A number of Mozambican soldiers as well as a single South African special forces operator were killed in the attack. Several other soldiers were injured. This marked the first death of a South African special forces operator in combat since the South African Border War
- 21 December: Two Mozambican militiamen were killed in an ISIS attack in an unspecified location in the Macomia region.

=== 2022 ===
- 2 January: Three civilians were killed after ISIS militants attacked the Christian village of Nofa Zambizia in Macomia district.
- 7 January: The village of Nashi Bandi was attacked by ISIS operatives, killing two Christian Mozambican militiamen and destroying at least 30 houses. On the same day, IS also claimed responsibility for attacking the village of Ikomila, in the Mueda region, killing one Mozambican militiaman and setting fire to several buildings.
- 8 January: IS claimed responsibility for an attack on the village of Alberto Chipande in the Mueda district, killing one civilian and one off-duty Mozambican militiaman.
- 11 January: Insurgents killed a fisherman after attacking the island of Ilha Quilhaule off the coast of the Ibo district.
- 12 January: Insurgents attacked Luneke, Nangane district, killing 3 civilians and then fleeing on a motorcycle.
- 13 January: SADC announced the extension of a 3 month military offensive targeting insurgent bases in Cabo Delgado and that so far they had successfully managed to kill 31 insurgents and had confiscated several weapons in the process.
- 15 January: ISIS operatives abducted 3 Mozambican militia fighters from Nova Zambezia and executed them by beheading.
- 23 January: Insurgents attacked the village of Limualamuala, beheading 3 civilians and burning down several buildings.
- 26 January: Insurgents attacked the village of Nova Zambezia, Macomia district, beheading one civilian.
- 27 January: The village of Mitambo, in eastern Meluco district, was attacked by a group of insurgents. One civilian was beheaded by insurgents during the attack.
- 28 January: The village of Iba, Meluco district, was attacked by insurgents, killing at least 6 civilians. The insurgents later left the village and began an attack on the village of Muaguide, killing another 8 civilians. IS later claimed the attack.
- 29 January: Rwandan and Mozambican soldiers ambushed a group of insurgents near Naquitengue, in southern Mocimboa da Praia district, killing two of them including an insurgent leader who was identified as 'Twahili Mwidini'.
- 31 January: Insurgents attacked Olumboa, a village on the coast of Macomia district, killing one civilian. IS later claimed responsibility for the attack.
- 1 February: Insurgents launched an attack on the coastal villages of Ilha Matemo and Matemo. The insurgents arrived by boat and killed 3 civilians in the course of the attack. IS later claimed responsibility.
- 5 February: Insurgents raided several areas between Macomia town and Pemba. In the raids, the insurgents ambushed a group of civilian hunters, killing 4 of them and stealing their food. The village of Rafique was also attacked, where one civilian was beheaded. Also on 5 February, insurgents ambush a Mozambican army patrol near Nova Zambezia, Macomia district, resulting in the deaths of 5 insurgents and one Mozambican soldier.
- 7 February: Insurgents attacked the village of Namuembe, south of Nangade, killing one civilian. A group of Mozambican militiamen later ambushed the insurgents as the attack was occurring. The ensuing firefight left 7 insurgents and 4 Mozambican militiamen dead.
- 6–8 February: Armed forces recaptured Nihca de Rovuma and Pundanhar villages where jihadists have set up their camps.
- 10 February: An insurgent was captured by Mozambican militiamen near Namuembe, revealing the location of an insurgent camp near Nangade and that the camp was largely led by Tanzanians. The Mozambican militiamen later ambushed a group of insurgents near Nangade, killing 6 insurgents.
- 6 September: Insurgents attacked a Catholic mission in Chipene, in the Diocese of Nacala, killing a Catholic nun, sister Maria de Coppi.
- 7 September: Following the attack on Chipene, the same insurgents attacked nearby settlements, killing at least three Christians.
- 30 November: SAMIM claimed that over 30 insurgents and 2 soldiers were killed following a clash in Cabo Delgado which resulted in the seizure of a number of weapons.
- 30 December: Attacks on Christian villages in northern Mozambique left two dead, four wounded, and caused much unrest and consternation in the region.

=== 2023 ===
- 8 August: a Mozambican army compound was attacked by ISIS operatives, killing 7 Mozambican soldiers. At least 50 assault rifles were seized by ISIS operatives.
- 25 August: Mozambique's armed forces have killed Bonomade Machude Omar, also known as Abu Sulayfa Muhammad and Ibn Omar, along with two others, The U.S.A. designated Omar as a terrorist leader of ISIS-Mozambique in August 2021, He was responsible for attacks in Cabo Delgado, and an attack on a hotel in the town of Palma in March 2021, as well as the Battle of Palma.
- 15 September: Insurgents entered the village of Naquitengue, near Mocimboa da Praia. After rounding up the villagers they separated and massacred 11 Christians.

=== 2024 ===
- 21 January: IS fighters occupy the town of Mucojo in Macomia district after Mozambican soldiers murdered several civilians near the town.
- 30 January: IS fighters ambush a Mozambican army patrol along the road between Mazeze and Mecúfi in Mecúfi district, leaving at least 8 soldiers dead and 4 vehicles destroyed. IS later released photos of the ambush.
- 31 January: Mozambican army retook Mucojo on the Macomia coast without a fight.
- 9 February: IS fighters raided the Mozambican army post in the town of Mucojo and killed 25 soldiers.
- 16 February: IS fighters occupied Quissanga.
- 3 March: IS fighters captured the island of Quirimba and killed at least 2 security personnel. Many locals were displaced and fled to the nearby city of Pemba.
- 24 March: Government forces retook the town of Quissanga and the nearby island of Quirimba after Islamic State fighters withdrew from the area.
- 10–11 May: Insurgents attacked the town of Macomia, engaging with Government troops from the local military base. Fighting continued until the early afternoon of Saturday, 11 May, when the militants withdrew. Hours later there were other attacks in the villages of Missufine and Cajerene, 70 km from Pemba. The attacks resulted in the mass flight of hundreds of local civilians, according to Catholic foundation Aid to the Church in Need.
- 30 May: Government forces and Rwandan troops claimed to have killed 50–70 IS fighters in district of Mocímboa da Praia, in province of Cabo Delgado.
- 17 September: An attack by joint Rwandan and Mozambique troops on an insurgent base at Quiterajo killed 5 IS fighters.
- 25 September: Rwandan and Mozambique forces recaptured the town of Mucojo killing 10 and capturing 4 IS fighters.

=== 2025 ===
- 18 February: Islamic State terrorists attempted to invade the village of Litamanda in the Macomia district, but local forces repelled the terrorists and killed two of them, according to Cabo Ligado.
- 19 February: the Islamic State attacked a village just north of the town of Macomia, where they looted, burned homes and killed two civilians. A local source said stolen food from western Macomia was being transported through the Catupa forest to support terrorists on the coast.
- 20 February: the Islamic State killed at least two members of the armed forces during an attack on a military outpost in Quissanga. Local sources told Mozambican news website Moz24h that the terrorists retreated before entering residential areas.
- 29 April: Two anti-poaching rangers were killed by ISIS fighters near Niassa, northern Mozambique.
- 4 May: Islamic State claimed to have killed three Rwandan soldiers, and the militants displayed two Israeli-made IWI ACE 32 assault rifles they had seized.
- 10 May: Islamic State claimed they attacked Government forces positions near the village of Miangalewa in the Muidumbe district of Cabo Delgado province, killing 11 soldiers, while other accounts put the death toll at 18.
- 29 May: An attack by ISIS fighters in an army outpost in Macomia have killed multiple Mozambique soldiers and more than 10 ISIS fighters.
- 15 June: A clash between Mozambique Army and ISIS militants killed 12 ISIS militants in Niassa province in Montepuez district.
- 27 July – A clash between ISIS militants and local militia left 14 militiamen dead.
- 29 July – Two ISIS militants were captured by Rwandan forces.
- 10 November – Over several days, militants attacked and razed villages, and killed several people, including at least four Christians.
- 1 December – A clash between Rwandan Defence Forces and ISIS militants in Macomia district resulted in 35 militants being killed.
- 10 December – In a high-profile visit to Cabo Delgado, Cardinal Pietro Parolin met with victims and internally displaced, telling them that the Church stands with them, saying: "I came to tell all of you, men and women of the people of God who live in Cabo Delgado, that you are not alone. You are not alone! The Holy Father, and the united and Universal Church are with you. Your suffering, your fears, but also your hopes are in the heart of Mother Church and hold a special place in the heart of the successor of Peter".

=== 2026 ===
- 9 January – ISM members planted an IED on a Rwandan military vehicle in Macomia, detonating it with no casualties. A convoy of commercial vehicles were ambushed on the same highway with multiple vehicles damaged, also with no casualties. At around the same time in the area, the insurgents were heard clashing with Rwandan forces.
- 10 January:
  - Militants killed a Local force member near Chai.
  - Demonstrators blocked roads in Macomia following the arrest of businessman trader Ali Mandade, as the IDS shot on the crowd, attempting to disperse them.
- 12 January – Fishermen were held captive and their boats stolen after militants arrived in Pangane and other towns along the coast.
- 15 January – An unidentified armed group attacked an artisanal gold mine in Marrupa District, killing a local musician and injuring three more.
- 18 January:
  - According to local sources, a mortar launched by the insurgents fell on a civilian area in the coastal town of Pangane, northeast of Mucojo, killing one civilian and injuring another.
  - Twenty-seven fishermen from the attack on 12 January are released by ISM.
- 23 January – A person was kidnapped by a group of ISM members in Namaik, Mocímboa da Praia while looking for someone else. It is the first incident in the locality since November 2025.
- 30 January – Three insurgents were killed in a clash with the FADM Navy patrol off the coast of Mocímboa da Praia.
- 31 January – ISM claims that nine FADM soldiers were killed in two clashes in the Catupa forest.
- 5 February – ISM fighters raided the village of Mumu, Mocímboa da Praia, killing a police officer and kidnapping three children. Several huts were also set on fire.
- 6 February – Insurgents killed one FADM soldier during a clash in Namabo, near Catupa while attempting to take back the area.
- 8 February – According to the ISM, they regained control of the Catupa position near the N380 highway; five FADM soldiers were killed in the ensuing clash, as well as three militants.
- 9–10 February – Two more state army soldiers were killed in clashes near Catupa.
- 14 February – One isolated soldier was killed by militants in around the same area.
- 20 February – Eight male individuals were kidnapped by a group of militants in Mocímboa da Praia.
- 22 February – An ambush on a commercial convoy escorting military killed four, including a child, on a highway near Quinto Congresso, Catupa forest.
- 23 February – ISM continued looting in the area until reinforcements by several militaries, police and local authorities clashed in Catupa, killing at least 15, including three Rwandan soldiers. Both sides had several wounded.
- 15 March – The FADM Navy opened fire on six intercepted fishing boats on the bay of Calugo locality, near Mocimboa da Praia, killing 13 civilian fishermen, and injuring three others, which left three unharmed survivors.
- 30 March – Four fishermen were kidnapped in Nambubussi neighborhood of Mocímboa da Praia by suspected Islamic terrorists. The fishing boat used by them was found on this date.
- 4 April – Two civilians, including a child were injured after the local police unit fired on women protesting in Anchilo, near Nampula town.
- 10–14 April – ISM fighters killed six civilians and kidnapped two more in four villages west of Macomia. The total includes three teenage boys, one of which were beheaded while the other two were kidnapped. On 10 April, the insurgents raided the town of Nkoe, which had already evacuated due to prior warnings. The remaining civilian who didn't flee was tortured and beheaded.
- 14 April – The Mozambican military captured 10 suspected Tanzanian insurgents in Nangade.
- 17–25 April – 767–776 individuals from four to five villages in Nangande district are displaced, 78 percent of which women and children, after ISM militants entered the areas and urged civilians to flee to loot the villages.
- 23 April:
  - Insurgents opened fire on a passenger bus in Mueda District, injuring the bus driver as other passengers took control of the wheel.
  - The Islamic State claimed that their members in Nkonga, Nangede, killed seven FADM soldiers in a clash near an outpost.
  - Four individuals were killed, various goods were stolen, and several villagers were forced to flee by ISM militants in Mitope neighborhood, Mocímboa da Praia.
- 26 April – The militants kidnapped and captured at least 80 gold miners from two artisanal gold mines following clashes with the FADM.
- 29 April – Multiple clashes occurred between the militants and state forces near Rwanda and other areas of Mozambique, with an unknown total amount of fatalities.
- 30 April – IS-linked militant group Ahlu al-Sunna wa al-Jama'a burned the São Luis Maria de Monfort Catholic church and a small community school in Minheneue village, Ancuabe after the incident on the 26th. Missionary residences and other infrastructure were also destroyed, including a kindergarten. Archbishop Inácio Saúre of Nampula said that they express "deep sorrow" and strongly condemned the attack in a speech.
- 1–19 May – A total of 15,286 people, half of whom children, fled from four towns in Ancuabe District over the course of 19 days, according to the International Organization for Migration. By 12 May, over 12,000–13,000 civilians were reported to have been fled.
- 4 May – Two militants were captured after they attacked an Estamos Juntos passenger bus in Mueda District.
- 7 May – A 27-year-old Tunisian man was arrested after being suspected of planning a terrorist attack on the Louvre in Paris. While detained, the man said that he would've joined the Islamic State, either the branch in Syria or the branch in Mozambique.
- 8 May:
  - The IS militants from the Minhuneue attack arrived in Chiúre District, killing five Christian civilians, four of whom men, and burned 163 houses in addition to a church in Namaculili. Insurgents separated the inhabitants by religion; two "Christian combatants" were killed.
  - Two insurgents were lynched to death by villagers in Ncocori after allegedly looting food supplies and goods.
- 10 May:
  - According to IS media, their members killed three "Christian combatants" in Ancuabe and Mocímboa da Praia. A Local Force member was also killed in Chai locality.
  - An improvised explosive device attached to a military vehicle near Macomia was detonated by ISM militants with no fatalities.
- 12 May – Off the coast of Cabo Delgado, the insurgents seized petrol in Tambuzi island as 13 boat operators were detained by state forces after fleeing from the island.
- 17 May:
  - ISM insurgents claimed to have killed 27 Naparama ethnic militia in the forest of Katapua, after setting ablaze on the entire village of Messanje, Chiúre. It was one of the deadliest clashes between the two groups in the history of the insurgency.
  - Three civilians were killed and another three abducted when a group of insurgents attacked Pundanhar, Palma.
- 19 May:
  - Mozambique informed Rwanda's Foreign Minister that it had secured funding for the continued operations of Rwandan forces in Cabo Delgado, after Rwanda warned in March that it might withdraw its troops from the province if sufficient funding was not provided.
  - ISM fighters raided Namoro locality, Chiúre, killing one "infidel", torching a church among other structures.
- 20 May:
  - An unarmed fisherman was shot dead in Napulubo, Macomia, with varying accounts of the group that shot the victim.
  - Five fishing boats were seized by militants near Pangane.
- 21 May – An alleged "Christian fighter" was killed by suspected ISM insurgents.
- 24 May – Insurgents killed at least two civilians on a violent attack in Muanona village, Namuno District. Forty houses and 13 shops were set on fire and immediately displaced dozens of families. Thirteen motorcycles were also stolen, as well as looting and destroying food supplies.
- 27 May – Clashes between ISM and state forces killed one Mozambican soldier.
- June – Johanniter International Assistance reports that an estimate of 1.1 million people in northern Mozambique needed humanitarian assistance, ~919,000 of whom were in Cabo Delgado alone. The organization also claimed that only half of the amount are currently receiving aid.
- 1–4 June – ISM members were active in four localities in Mesa, Ancuabe. In N'naua village of Ancuabe, an unknown number of people were kidnapped by Islamic State members, and were allegedly released shortly after for a ransom of 10,000 meticais each.
- 3 June – A young miner and a Rapid Intervention Unit (UIR) agent were killed and seven others injured following clashes between the two parties at a ruby mining site in Montepuez.
- 4 June – An IED device on a vehicle carrying Rwandan troops was detonated, injuring the occupants.
- 6 June:
  - In Muidumbe district, the insurgents raided Xitavi village, killing two and looting food.
  - The Catholic bishop of Quelimene, Zambezia, was fatally shot at an episcopal site early morning, with international reactions from the United States, the Holy See and the European Union. Three people who were linked to the shooting are arrested soon after.
- 15 June – Two unauthorized miners were killed and two state police officers injured in a clash at the aforementioned ruby mining site in Montepuez.
- 22 June – ISM claims to have killed five state soldiers overnight in Namabo, Macomia.
- 3 July – President Daniel Chapo announces the relocation of the Counterterrorism Operations Command from Pemba to Mocímboa da Praia to be in immediate effect.
- 5 July – Militants recaptured Catupa base after the FADM abandoned the position earlier in the year. According to an Islamic State propaganda outlet, the insurgents allegedly killed 11 soldiers in the same position.
- 5–12 July – An estimated 20 fatalities were linked to clashes and firefights across Cabo Delgado.
- 13 and 20 July – Two mining sites in Ancuabe were invaded by militants, who kidnapped an unspecified number of artisanal miners, traders, and children. At one of the mines—the Muaja gold mine—victims were held for a ransom of 60,000 meticais.
- 18 July – A RIU police officer fatally shot one man while detaining him in Manhiça, Maputo.
- 23 July:
  - The Japanese Government donated 720 tons of food products to support approximately 10,500 affected families in Pemba. The products were distributed by the World Food Program as the Ambassador of Japan to Mozambique, Keiji Hamada, expressed his wishes to those affected.
  - Rwandan troops raided an ISM ribat (temporary position) near Cogolo, killing five insurgents.
- 24 July – ISM claims to have killed six Rwandan soldiers and an informant, damaged a vehicle, and stole weapons in the same area.
- 26 July:
  - Insurgents hold three vehicles and 10 people for ransom near Nicocue locality, securing 389,000 meticais. According to a local news source, two gold miners were found decapitated at the site on the 27th.
  - Four others were claimed to have been kidnapped on the road linking Montepuez to Mueda.
- 30 July – Two individuals on a motorcycle were kidnapped by alleged armed men in military uniforms along the N380, near V Congreso.
- 31 July – At least 150 fighters advanced north toward Niassa from Nicocue and Ntola, passing Shamba Kubwa.
- 1 August – FADM and ISM militants clashed in the informal gold mining site of Shamba Kubwa, killing at least 16 insurgents.
- 2 August – Three alleged armed members of the Defense and Security Forces are lynched to death by civilians after they allegedly attempted to invade a residence in Coronini, Namubo district.
- 14 August – Militants abducted civilians in two neighborhoods near Mocímboa da Praia, although reports varied on the number of people taken. Local sources also reported the abductions of fishermen off the coast of Tambuzi Island.
- 18 August – A young man was arrested after being suspected of supplying insurgents from an FADM checkpoint in Malinde.
- 22 August:
  - Four fishermen that were on a vessel departing from Metuge were said to have been kidnapped by suspected insurgents.
  - Insurgent attacks in a locality within Mavala administrative post, Balama district, displaced approximately 531 individuals. According to the IOM, 38% of the displaced were children under 18 years of age.
- 23 August – One person was killed and two others were severely injured after a shootout with Rapid Intervention Unit forces in Namanhumbir.
- 2 September – It was reported that two children were abducted by insurgents in separate incidents across Macomia.
- 3 September – In Marangira, Niassa reserve, a hunting concession and tourist camp was raided by militants, who set fire to infrastructure, public service facilities, and vehicles. At least two to four people were killed and several others were injured, as militants took at least 11 other hostages, including children. Weapons and supplies were also stolen, as well as two vehicles that were later abandoned.
- 7 September – The South African foreign ministry announced that a South African man was one of the at least dozen people abducted in the insurgent attack on a hunting camp last week.
- 13 September:
  - Mozambican forces executed a joint operation accompanied with Rwandan reinforcements, killing at least two Islamist insurgents during clashes near Quiterajo administrative post, Macomia. One Mozambican soldier was wounded.
  - Insurgents raided a corn field near Nkóe, making villagers migrate towards the neighboring village of Nova Zambézia.
- 14 September – At least 11 hectares (27 acres) of farmland that were planted with bananas, sesame, and sugar cane seeds were torched and destroyed by suspected insurgents in Lutete locality, north of the province.
- 16 September:
  - A local force member was killed in an insurgent attack on the border between Nangade and Palma districts.
  - IS media said it successfully detonated an IED against Rwandan patrol in Mbau, southwest of Mocímboa da Praia. A civilian was also killed in a separate attack on the town that day..
- 18 September – One civilian was killed by militants in Mangoma village, west of Mocímboa da Praia.
- 21 September–13 October – In IOM's occasional displacement tracking report, an estimated 5,794 individuals were displaced in five districts of Cabo Delgado due to the occurrences and fears of insurgent attacks, including 2,682 people who fled from Nambedo locality in Nangade district. 54% of the displaced were children, with 3,136 individuals.
- 22 September – A total of 12 people were allegedly abducted and three more were killed in attacks by ISM insurgents in Miangaleua, Muidumbe district, and Chai, Macomia district respectively. The attackers were demanding MZN50,000 per hostage released, according to local sources.
- 28 September – ISM claimed that they have killed two people, likely Local Force members, near Maputo locality in Palma district, north of Mocímboa da Praia.
- October – On an unspecified exact date, a Rwandan patrol force clashed with militants off the coast of Cogolo in Macomia district, resulting in an unknown amount of casualties.
- 4 October – Three hostages (including two nationals both from Zimbabwe and South Africa) who were abducted during the hunting camp raid that took place in Marangira last month were released from the Shamba Kubwa mine in return for a reported ransom of MZN3,200,000. The negotiation followed three-week long standoff between state forces and the insurgents near the mining site.
- 8 October – Presumed police officers reportedly abducted two artisanal miners in Mpaka, Balama district in an alleged attempt to extort money, following recent insurgent presence in the locality.
- 12 October – The governor of Cabo Delgado, Valige Tauabo, visited the localities of Mahate and Mussemero in Quissanga district, demonstrating authority in an area where militants typically pass through.
- 14 October:
  - In IOM's occasional displacement tracking report, an estimated 1,235 individuals were displaced in four districts of Cabo Delgado because of insurgent activity, including 785 who were displaced from Mocímboa da Praia.
  - FADM soldiers purportedly beat up civilians in Mecuti when they reportedly refused to flee the area despite orders to do so in the past few days.
- 17 October – A vessel controlled by a brother of a senior insurgent leader was attacked and capsized in a military operation conducted by the Mozambican Navy Marines off the coast of Mocímboa da Praia district, killing three insurgents and abducting another who was said to be linked to Hassan Ulanga, an ISM leader.
- 18 October – Six militants and one civilian was killed after the RDF disrupted a group of ISM fighters who were purchasing supplies in Marijirane near the coast.
- 20 October – Tanzanian troops stationed in Nangade killed two suspected insurgents who had crossed from Tanzania, arresting another,
- 21 October – ISM insurgents who likely came from Montupuez were reportedly seen moving through Quissanga in spite of the presence of state forces in the area.
- 21–31 October – At least 19 people were killed by ISM insurgents in various incidents that took place throughout seven locations near the Mueda–Muidumbe district border. The fatalities, including 18 civilians and some youth, were described by their militant propaganda outlets as Christians.
- 26 October – The last remaining insurgents who were active in Montepuez earlier July returned to Macomia district after being split into three separate groups by 21 October.
- 30 October – Residents told The Mozambique Times that three people were found beheaded on this date by insurgents while producing a local sugarcane-based alcoholic liquor in Muatide village, Muidumbe District. The newspaper added that the insurgents considered the production of alcoholic beverages haram.
- 31 October – Two residents of Agrícola village who were working at a farm in Mueda district were beheaded by insurgents, according to local accounts.
- 1 November – IS propaganda sources claimed responsibility for the killings of 13 alleged Christians that took place in Muidumbe and Mueda districts over the past week.
- 4 November – The Secretary of State in Cabo Delgado confirmed the recent kidnappings and killings of civilians across multiple villages of Muidumbe District, with varying reported casualty tolls.
- 5 November – The Finnish Government formally donated €1 million worth of sunflower oil, peas, and rice purchased from Ukraine to the Cabo Delgado provincial government as complementary assistance to the 330,000 people displaced by the humanitarian crisis in Cabo Delgado, with help from the World Food Programme.

== Insurgency as a maritime threat ==
In 2011, Northern Mozambique gained much international attention when large offshore gas fields containing up to 425 billion cubic meters of gas, were discovered. With the goal of becoming a major international player in the energy sector, Mozambique's government has prioritized the region's economic attractiveness and has sent its army to ensure the safety of planned investments. Foreign activities include a $30 billion investment of US-based company Exxon Mobil and expected $20 billion of Total Energies. While Total Energies has stated that they will pause their investment to reassess the security situation in Northern Mozambique, the EU's planned reduction in Russian gas imports has made the project more likely.

Terrorist activity is viewed as a risk to international LNG investment, with concerns raised about the kidnapping of foreign workers. However, indigenous coastal communities and maritime facilities are also targets of violent activity: in 2021, the port town of Palma was attacked, killing dozens of civilians. Maritime infrastructure has also been targeted, with the key port of Mocimboa da Praia being seized.

Attacks on maritime infrastructure can be attributed to rising social inequality. The exploitation of the region's natural resources, including the offshore gas fields, puts the native population at risk, as they face displacement and very little profit returns to the region due to high levels of corruption. Finding its root in the precarious economic situation and the political marginalization of the native population, local conflicts have been used to radicalize young men.

Given the increase in extreme violent activities and simultaneously in military personnel, tensions are likely to rise as the region's economic exploitation continues. This also endangers the region's maritime environment. Conflicts on the land spill over to the sea, creating an unsafe environment for offshore investments. Because Northern Mozambique is a major transnational drug trafficking hub, contested governance on land and sea facilitates maritime heroin smuggling.

The deteriorating security situation has led to various international efforts in order to support Mozambique's maritime capabilities and ensure safety along the coast. Russia deployed the Wagner Group, a private security organization heavily linked to the Russian government in Northern Mozambique but failed its mission to support counter-insurgency activities and withdrew in 2020. Wagner Group was allegedly aided by the Russian fleet, though this has not been officially proven. Mozambique has formed an arrangement with Italy to train its navy, while Portugal, the former colonial power, has donated speedboats to the country. Furthermore, Mozambique and India are cooperating on marine security issues, with India assisting in the development of the country's naval infrastructure and the training of personnel. In addition, South Africa has dispatched naval patrol vessels, and Rwanda has increased its presence along the coast. Currently, the UNODC is assisting Mozambique's naval capabilities by training the country's Navy, Maritime Authority, and maritime law enforcement officers, thereby improving domain awareness and port security. However, mere capability training for law enforcement authorities is controversial, as corruption, power abuse and involvement in illicit economies is high in Mozambique's state authorities.

== Limits on media freedom ==
There is a lack of access to reliable information in the region due to journalists being intimidated by government and military personnel. On 5 January 2019, Mozambican authorities unlawfully detained journalist Amade Abubacar, who had reported on the insurgency. He was subsequently subjected to torture, and only released on bail after 107 days in detention.

== War crimes ==
The rebels have committed extensive war crimes, targeting and murdering civilians on many occasions during the insurgency.

In addition, Mozambican security forces were reportedly filmed as they tortured and murdered captured rebel fighters. Amnesty International said that the videos were genuine, while Mozambique's defense ministry spokesperson Omar Saranga argued that they were probably produced by the rebels themselves, using captured uniforms to produce propaganda against the government.

== See also ==
- Southern African Development Community Mission in Mozambique
- List of wars involving Mozambique
- Mozambican War of Independence
- Mozambican Civil War
- Islamic terrorism
- Insurgency in the Maghreb (2002–present)
- Islamist insurgency in the Sahel
- Boko Haram (or ISWAP) insurgency
- Sinai insurgency
