= European Union Training Mission in Mozambique =

EU force to train Mozambique's Armed Forces

- Commanded by: Brigadier-General Luis Fernando Machado Barroso Portugal
- Date: 3 November 2021-present
- Executed by: Portugal; Greece; Italy; Finland; Romania; Spain; Belgium; Lithuania; Austria; Estonia; Luxembourg

EUTM-Moz (European Union Training Mission in Mozambique) is a European Union multinational military training mission headquartered in Maputo, Mozambique.

11 EU members (Portugal, Greece, Italy, Finland, Romania, Spain, Belgium, Lithuania, Austria, Luxembourg and Estonia) are engaged in this mission and have sent soldiers to the Republic of Mozambique.

== Mandates ==
The decision to create EUTM-Moz was first adopted by the European Council at a meeting in July 2021 and it was requested by the Mozambican Government. The goal of the mission is to provide training and support to the Mozambican Armed Forces in order to protect civilian populations and restore security in the Cabo Delgado Province. The mission will end two years after full operational capacity is achieved. It has a budget of €15.16 million. In May 2024, the mission, now known as the European Union Military Assistance Mission (EUMAM) in Mozambique, was extended until June 2026.

== Objectives ==
The mission will train 11 companies: 5 companies of Mozambican Navy marines in Katembe and 6 companies of Mozambican Army Special Forces in Chimoio with the goal of equipping the Mozambican Armed Forces with a capable Quick Reaction Force with around a total of 1,100 soldiers undergoing training during the entire mission. To do so, it will provide:

- Military training including operational preparation
- Specialised training, including on counterterrorism
- Training and education on the protection of civilians and compliance with international humanitarian law and human rights law, including specific training on Women, Peace and Security

The EUTM Mozambique Mission builds on the existing Portuguese Army Training Mission, first created in January 2021, with the goal of training Mozambican special forces, marines and quick reaction forces, in response to the Cabo Delgado Crisis.

== EU Mission Force Commander of EUTM Mozambique ==
- 1st Commander - Brigadier General Nuno Lemos Pires (Portugal) (3 November 2021 to 9 September 2022)
- 2nd Commander - Comodoro Rogério Martins de Brito (Portugal) (9 September 2022 to 15 September 2023)
- 3rd Commander - Major General João Gonçalves (Portugal) (15 September 2023 to 11 September 2024)
- 4th Commander - Brigadier-General Luis Fernando Machado Barroso (Portugal) (11 September 2024 to present)
