= SADC Mission in Mozambique =

Peacekeeping mission

Southern African Development Community (SADC) Mission in Mozambique
- Cabo Delgado, Province of Mozambique
- Leaders: Prof. Mpho Molomo (Mission Head); Maj Gen. Xolani Mankayi (Force Commander).
- Dates active: July 15, 2021 – present (4 years, 11 months and 1 week)
- Country: SADC: South Africa; Botswana; Lesotho; Tanzania; Angola; Zambia; Malawi; DRC; Namibia
- Headquarters: Pemba, Mozambique
- Active regions: Northern Mozambique
- Size: Brigade
- Wars: Insurgency in Cabo Delgado

The Southern African Development Community Mission in Mozambique (SAMIM) is an active regional peacekeeping mission operated by the Southern African Development Community in Northern Mozambique's Cabo Delgado Province.

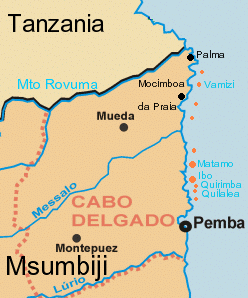
Map of the Operational Area

== Authorisation ==
SAMIM was deployed on 15 July 2021 following its approval by the Extraordinary SADC Summit of Heads of State and Government held in Maputo, Republic of Mozambique on 23 June 2021. On 2 January 2022, at a summit of SADC Summit of Heads of State Malawi's capital Lilongwe, agreement was given to extend the troop deployment in Mozambique to help the government fight an Islamic State-linked insurgency.

== Leadership and command ==
=== Head of Mission ===
| No. | Name | Nationality | From | To | Note |
|---|---|---|---|---|---|
| 1 | Prof. Mpho Molomo | Botswana | 15 July 2021 | Incumbent | |

=== Force Commanders ===
| No. | Name | Nationality | From | To | Note |
|---|---|---|---|---|---|
| 1 | Maj. Gen. Xolani Mankayi | South Africa | 15 July 2021 | Incumbent | |

=== Deputy Force Commanders ===
| No. | Name | Nationality | From | To | Note |
|---|---|---|---|---|---|
| 1 | Brigadier Dumisani Ndzinge | Botswana | 15 July 2021 | 8 February 2022 | |
| 2 | Brigadier Simon Barwabatsile | Botswana | 8 February 2022 | Incumbent | |

== Force organization ==
=== Force structure ===
SADC Flag

The envisioned deployment was around an infantry brigade sized force with maritime and air elements attached.
Ground forces

- 1x Brigade Headquarters
- 3x Light infantry Battalions.
- 2x Special Forces Squadrons.
- 1x Engineer Squadron.
- 1x Signal Squadron.

Logistics

- 1x Level II field hospital.
- 1x Field recovery unit
- 1x Field workshop unit
- 1x Field mobile stores unit

Maritime

- 2x Patrol Boats
- 1x Submarine
- 1x Maritime Patrol Aircraft

Air

- 2x UAV's
- 6x Helicopters
- 4x Transport Aircraft

=== Contingents ===
The following contingents have been deployed so far:

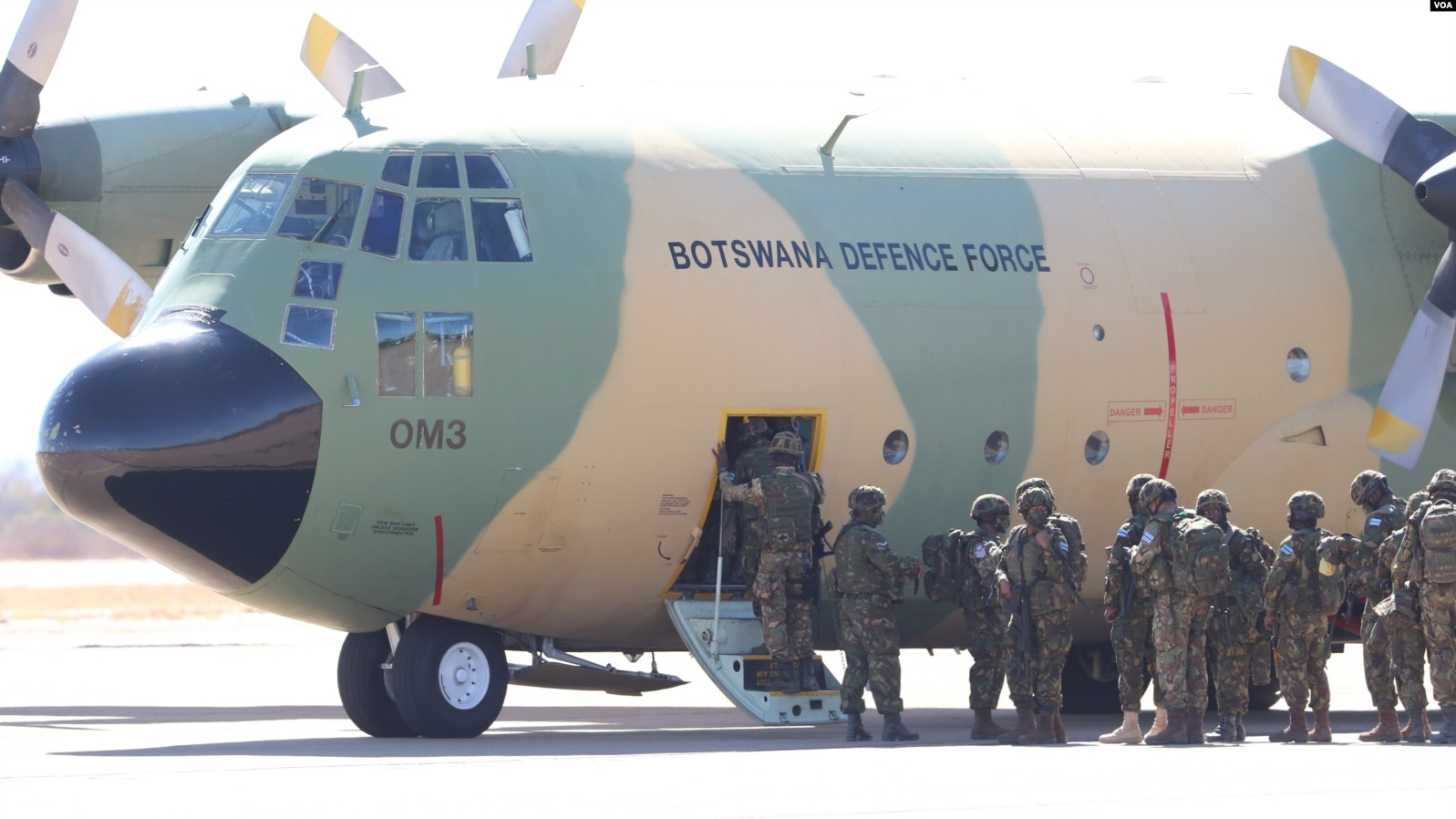
Botswana soldiers board a Botswana Defence Force plane to Mozambique, July 2021

==== Angola contingent ====
Angolan Armed Forces deployed 20 personnel and an Ilyushin Il-76 transport aircraft to the mission.

==== South Africa contingent ====
South African National Defence Force has an approved force strength of 1495 personnel. Deployed elements include personnel and assets from the South African Air Force South African Navy, South African Army, South African Military Health Service & South African Special Forces

==== Botswana contingent ====
Botswana Defence Force Deployed 296 personnel to the mission in July 2021.

==== Lesotho contingent ====
Lesotho Defence Force has deployed 125 personnel to the mission. The contingent was airlifted by an Angolan Air Force Ilyushin Il-76 transport to the mission.

==== Tanzania contingent ====
Tanzania People's Defence Force was reported to be deploying 274 troops to the mission.

==== Namibia Contingent ====
Namibian Defence Force and Namibian Police Force deployed a contingent of 8 Staff Officers in March 2022.

== Deployment ==
An advance element of the South African Special Forces deployed to Pemba via South African Air Force C-130 Aircraft, the main body and equipment were deployed by road. Botswana Defence Force Commandos also deployed via Botswana Defence Force C-130 to Pemba, the main body of equipment deployed by road to Northern Mozambique. Lesotho Defence Force personnel and equipment were airlifted to Northern Mozambique by Angolan transport aircraft.

=== Operations ===
The SADC states also began with their offensive in August 2021, with SAMIM troops becoming involved in combat operations for the first time. On 24 August rebels reportedly ambushed SAMIM troops in Naquitengue, near Mbau,. On 28 August, SAMIM troops reportedly raided an insurgent position at Muera River, capturing equipment and documents. In September 2021 SAMIM troops also began to deploy in Niassa Province; groups of insurgents were suspected of having retreated or otherwise relocated to Niassa. Other bands of rebels were moving further south, away from the combat zone of the Messalo River. These groups relocated to Quissanga and Macomia District, where the rebels began a series of attacks on local villages, massacring dozens of civilians. SAMIM claimed to have captured the "Sheikh Ibrahim base" in northern Macomia District from rebels on 14 September. 24 September a report from the SADC Mission in Mozambique (SAMIM) reported that a Tanzanian soldier and 17 insurgents were killed in an attack on an insurgent base near Chitama, in southeastern Nangade district. On 19 December Mozambique's defence minister claimed Mozambican and SAMIM soldiers killed ten insurgents after storming an ISIS camp in Cabo Delgado. On 20 December 2021 A patrol consisting of South African Special Forces and Mozambican ground troops were ambushed by ISIS east of Chai village. A number of Mozambican soldiers as well as a single South African special forces operator were killed in the attack. Several other soldiers were injured. This marked the first death of a South African special forces operator in combat since the South African Border War. On 5 February 2022 A patrol of Mozambican, Rwandan and SAMIM soldiers was ambushed near Nova Zambezia, Macomia district, resulting in a Mozambican soldier KIA and five insurgent attackers eliminated. On 9 February 2022 a Botswana Defence Force soldier died in Mueda, Cabo Delgado Province Mozambique due to unnamed cause. In February the Zambia Air Force announced that it had deployed as single C-27 cargo plane to Pemba, Mozambique. South Africa was reported to be deploying an entire battle group as part of its rotation, replacing largely its Special Forces Contingent

== Casualties ==
- 3 August 2021: Corporal Jacob Ramagonono of the Botswana Defence Force passed on due to motor vehicle accident.
- 25 September 2021: an unnamed Tanzania People's Defence Force soldier was Killed in Action south of Chitama, Nangade district.
- 28 November 2021: Private Moalosi Jacob Khoaele of the Lesotho Defence Force passed on due to illness.
- 20 December 2021: Corporal Tebogo Edwin Radebe of the South African National Defence Force was Killed in Action.
- 9 February 2022: Sergeant Gosekwang Ngaka of the Botswana Defence Force Special Forces died in Mueda, Cabo Delgado Province Mozambique due to unnamed cause.

== See also ==
- Force Intervention Brigade
- SADC Mission in the Democratic Republic of Congo
