= Palma, Mozambique =

Town in Mozambique

Palma Mji wa Palma
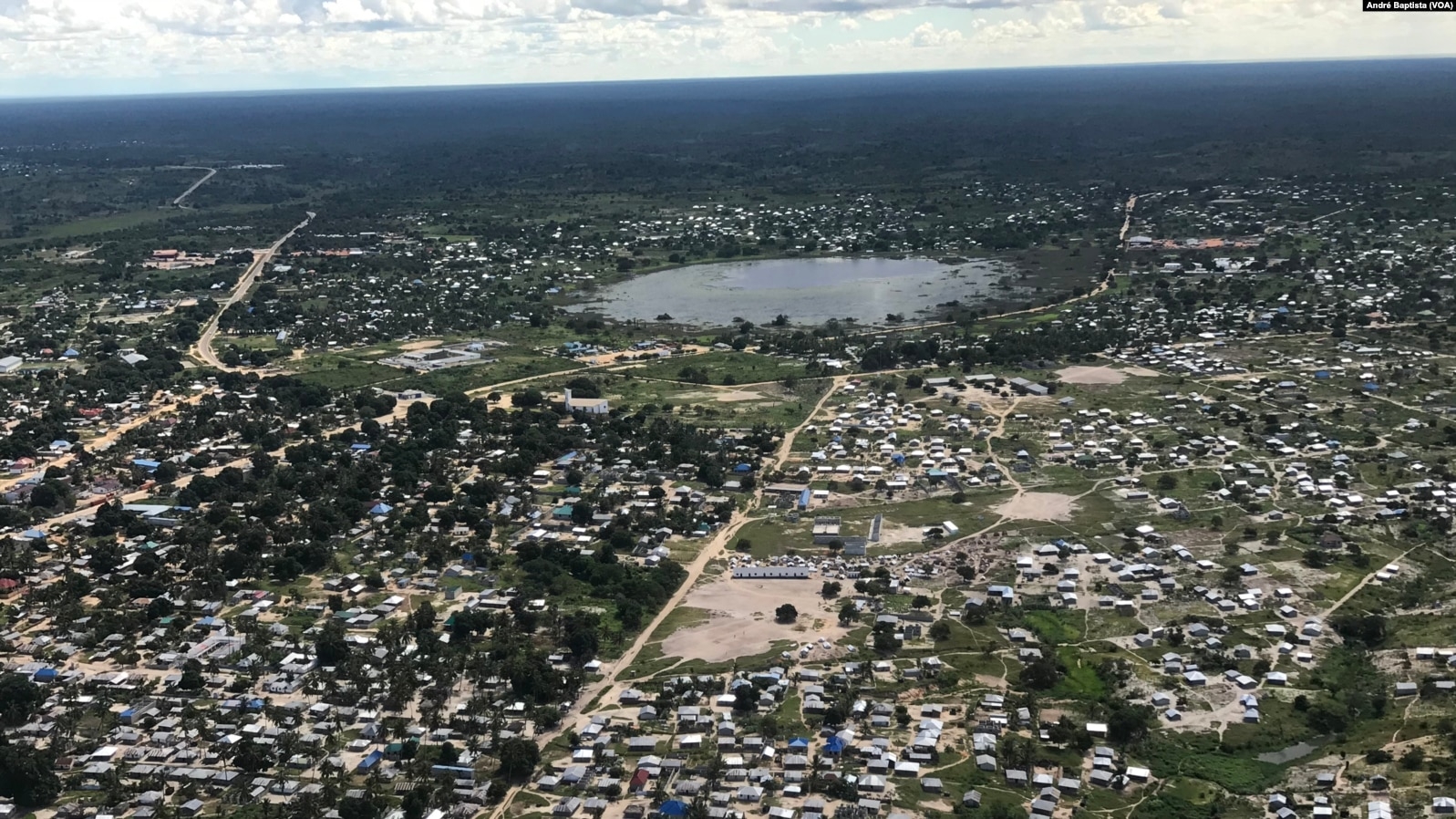
- Aerial photo of Palma

- Location within Mozambique
- Coordinates: 10°46′33″S 40°28′00″E
- Country: Mozambique
- Provinces: Cabo Delgado Province
- District: Palma District

Population (before 2021 attack)
  - Total: c. 75,000
- Time zone: UTC+2 (Central Africa Time)

Palma is a town on the northeast coast of Mozambique's Cabo Delgado Province. Less than 32 kilometres (20 mi) away is the border with Mtwara Region of Tanzania to the north and north-west.

== Economy and languages ==
Various languages, including Makwe, Makonde, Mwani, Swahili, and Portuguese, are spoken in the town. The town was historically known for its fishing, basketry, and mat-weaving industries.

The local economy was transformed by the discovery of gas in the nearby Indian Ocean in 2010, which led to a rapidly growing liquefied natural gas sector. Palma is close to facilities for natural gas extraction off the coast of Mozambique, a major offshore gas project by TotalEnergies.

== 2021 attack ==
Beginning in October 2017, armed Islamist extremists linked to the Islamic State of Iraq and the Levant (ISIL) launched a jihadist insurgency in the Cabo Delgado region. The militants launched attacks and committed mass beheadings, and in August 2020 seized the port town of Mocimboa da Praia. The group sometimes called themselves al-Shabaab, although they do not have known links with the Somali al-Shabaab, a different jihadist group.

They attacked Palma on 24 March 2021; more than 35,000 people were displaced, many fleeing to the provincial capital, Pemba. Dozens of civilians were murdered, with beheaded bodies left in the street. The militants battled with the Mozambican military, police, and the Dyck Advisory Group (a private military company hired by the police). Lionel Dyck, the head of the Dyck group, said that the attackers wore dark uniforms, were organized, and well-equipped with AK-47 rifles, RPD and PKM machine guns, and heavy mortars.

Prior to the attack, the population was around 75,000. Many foreign and domestic natural gas workers evacuated the town by boat, helicopter, and convey, but others could not be evacuated. Most communications with the town were cut off on 29 March. On 29 March, Islamic State of Iraq and the Levant claimed that its Islamic State's Central Africa Province was responsible for the attack and said they had killed 1,661 people, including Mozambican army soldiers; this is claimed by US author Alex Perry in his book "Blood Will Flow" (2026). Perry visited Palma on many occasions and asked the locals to list all the victims by name. He claims that the attack took more lives than any Islamist attack since 9/11.

The attack on Palma raised fears of a possible humanitarian crisis.

On 5 April, military forces of Mozambique recaptured Palma.
