= Mozambican =

Mozambican may refer to:

- Something of, from, or related to Mozambique, a country in southeastern Africa
- A person from Mozambique, or of Mozambican descent:
  - Demographics of Mozambique
  - Culture of Mozambique
  - List of Mozambicans
- Mozambican Portuguese, the varieties of Portuguese spoken in Mozambique
- Languages of Mozambique
- Mozambican cuisine
