= Languages of Mozambique =

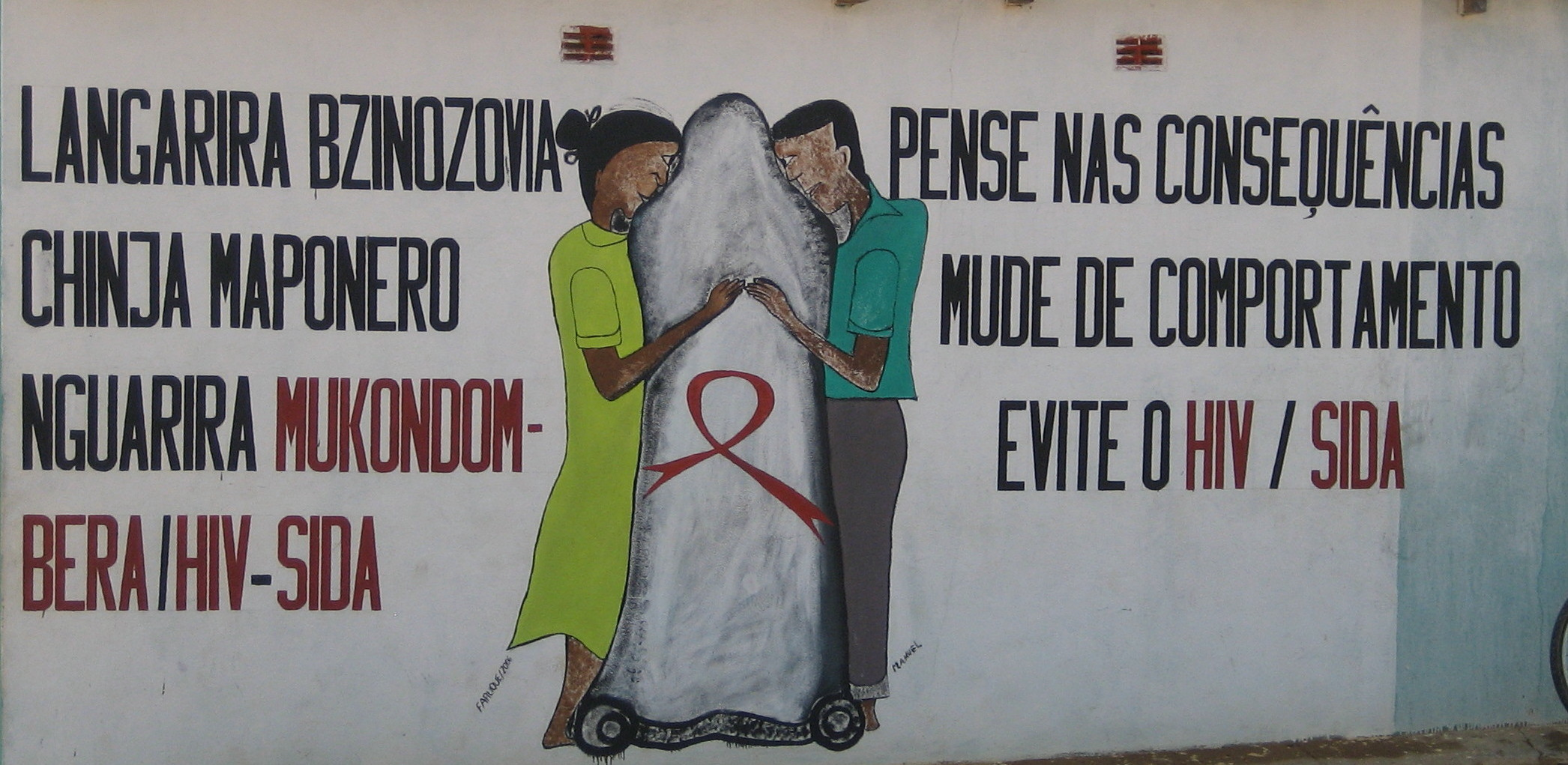
- AIDS awareness sign in the Machaze District in Ndau and Portuguese
- Official: Portuguese
- Recognised: Makhuwa, Sena, Tsonga, Lomwe, Shona
- Indigenous: Barwe, Chewa, Chichopi, Chitonga, Chuwabu, Dema, Gitonga, Kimwani, Koti, Kunda, Maindo, Makonde, Makwe, Manyika, Nathembo, Ndau, Ngoni, Nsenga, Nyungwe, Phimbi, Ronga, Sena, Swahili, Swati, Tawara, Tewe, Tswa, Yao
- Vernacular: Mozambican Portuguese
- Immigrant: English, Arabic (Mozambican Arabic), Punjabi, Hindi
- Foreign: English
- Signed: Mozambican Sign Language
- Keyboard layout: Portuguese QWERTY

Mozambique is a multilingual country. A number of Bantu languages are indigenous to Mozambique. Portuguese, inherited from the colonial period (see: Portuguese Mozambique), is the official language, and Mozambique is a full member of the Community of Portuguese Language Countries. Ethnologue lists 43 languages spoken in the country.

According to INE, the National Institute of Statistics of Mozambique, Portuguese is the most widely spoken language in Mozambique: according to the 2007 national population and housing census, 50.4% of the national population aged 5 and older (80.8% of people living in urban areas and 36.3% in rural areas) are fluent in the language. The 2017 national population and housing census found out that Portuguese is spoken by 47.4% of all Mozambicans aged 5 and older, with native speakers making up 16.6% of the population (38.3% in the cities and 5.1% in rural areas, respectively).

Portuguese is spoken as a native language by around 50% of the population in Maputo.

Mozambique has 22 Bantu origin languages which are: Swahili, Makhuwa, Sena, Ndau, Tswa-Ronga (Tsonga), Lomwe, Ekoti, Nahara, Makonde, Chopi, Chuwabu, Ronga, Kimwani, Nhungwe, Chimanika, Ndau, Chiyao, Chichewa, Bitonga, Ngoni, Tswa and Chitewe. The language of the deaf community is Mozambican Sign Language.

Small communities of Arabs, Chinese, and Indians (primarily the Gujarati language) speak their own languages (Indians from Portuguese India speak any of the Portuguese Creoles of their origin) aside from Portuguese as their second language.

Article 9 of Mozambique's constitution provides for the recognition of national languages and that such languages be considered of "cultural and educational heritage" and that the state "shall promote their development and increasing use as languages that convey our identity". Portuguese is deemed the country's official language by article 10.

== Sociolinguistics ==
=== Multilingualism ===
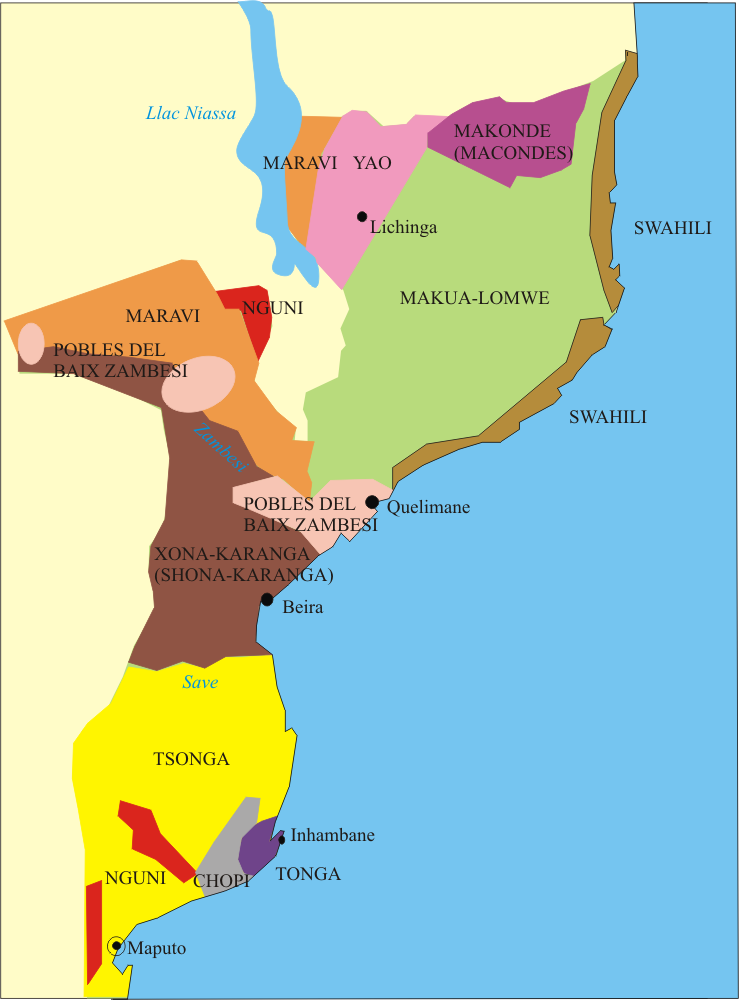
Ethnolinguistic map of Mozambique

Most Mozambicans speak more than one language. According to the Mozambican MINEDH, primary education will become fully bilingual, starting in 2017, and include 16 Mozambican languages, followed by Portuguese as a foreign language. According to the 2007 census, about 50.4% of all people aged 5 and older speak Portuguese, and 10.7%, including people of Portuguese ancestry and mestiços, speak it as their first language. Use of the Portuguese language remains strongly concentrated to the urban population of Mozambique along the coast.

=== Linguistic geography ===
The map shows the dominant language by region.

Additionally, the second map shows where Portuguese has become a native language of over 10% of the population.

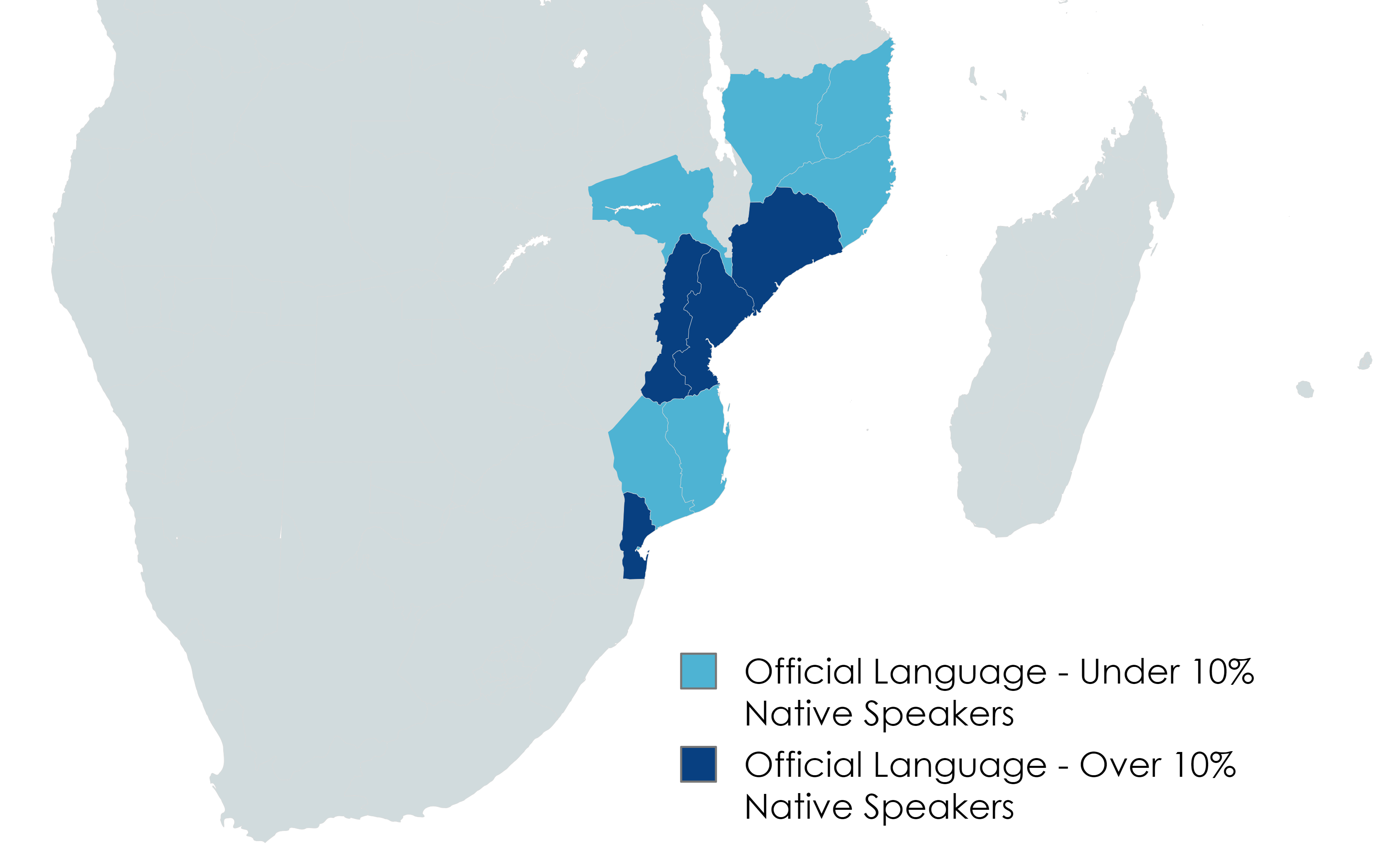
Current 2024 Portuguese language distribution

=== Influence among languages ===
Many indigenous languages of Mozambique have loan words of Portuguese origin.

== Largest language groups ==
Languages of Mozambique (2017)
Languages	percent
Emakhuwa	26.1%
Portuguese	16.6%
Xitsonga	8.6%
Nyanja	8.1%
Cisena	7.1%
Elomwe	7.1%
Echuwabo	4.7%
Cindau	3.8%
XiTswa	3.8%
Other Mozambican	11.8%
Other	0.5%
Unspecified	1.8%

Largest language groups in Mozambique (2017)
Language	Number of speakers (L1)	Percentage of population
Emakhuwa	5,856,590	26.3
Portuguese	3,737,726	16.8
Xichangana	1,984,299	8.9
Cinyanja	1,836,323	8.3
Elomwe	1,581,281	7.1
Cisena	1,541,751	6.9
Echuwabo	984,995	4.4
Cindau	813,563	3.7
Xitswa	778,781	3.5
Other Mozambican languages	2,636,970	11.9
Other foreign languages	89,434	0.4
None	2,842	0.0
Unknown	398,818	1.8
Total	22,243,373	100
