= Demographics of Mozambique =

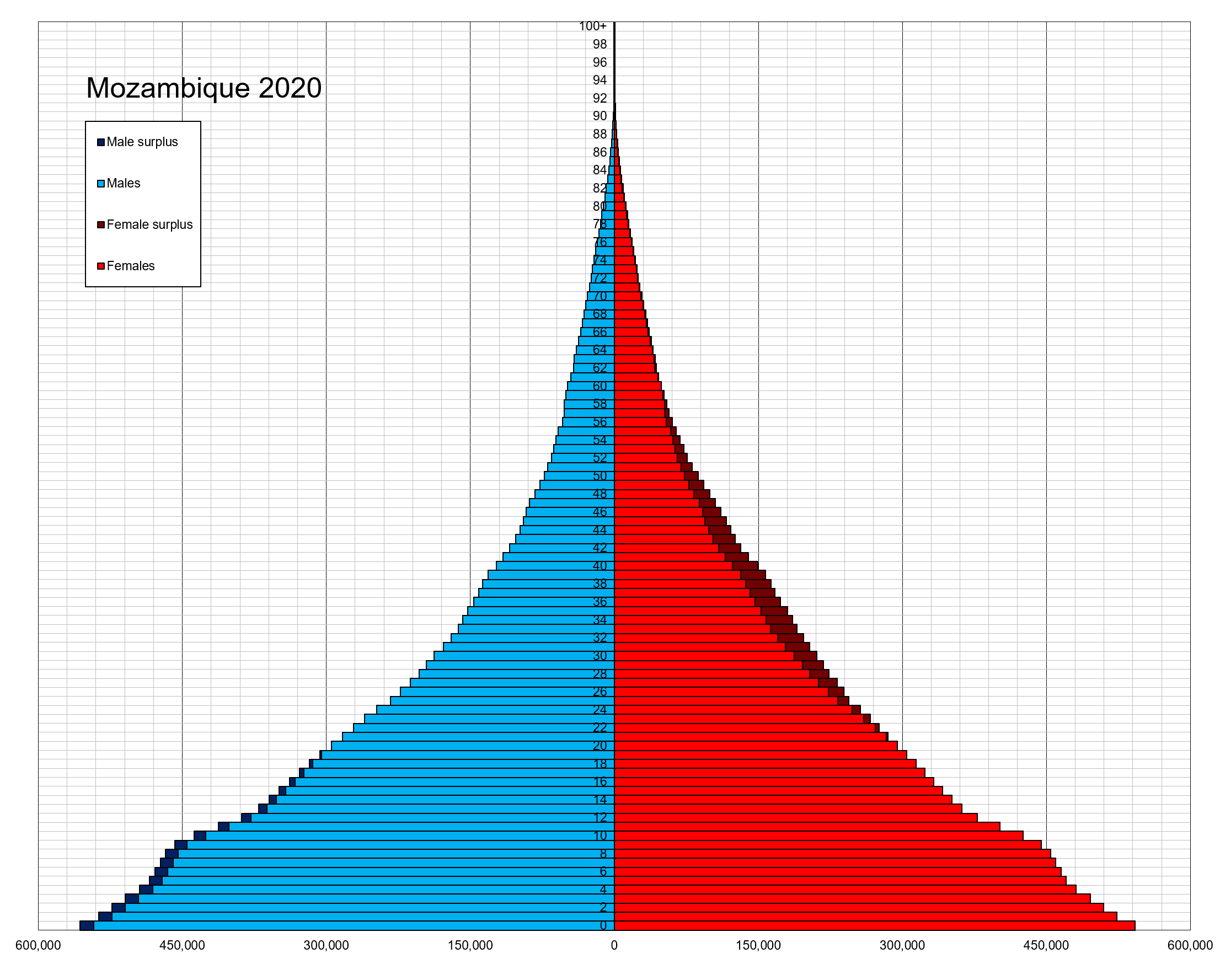
- Population pyramid of Mozambique in 2020
- Population: 31,691,009 (2022 est.)
- Growth rate: 2.56% (2022 est.)
- Birth rate: 37.47 births/1,000 population (2022 est.)
- Death rate: 10.25 deaths/1,009 population (2023 est.)
- Life expectancy: 57.1 years
- Fertility rate: 4.81 children born/woman (2022 est.)
- Infant mortality: 61.38 deaths/1,009 live births
- Net migration rate: -1.58 migrant(s)/1,009 population (2023 est.)

Age structure
- 0–14 years: 45.57%
- 65 and over: 2.93%

Nationality
- Nationality: Mozambican
- Major ethnic: African (99%)

Language
- Official: Portuguese
- Spoken: Languages of Mozambique

Mozambiques population between 1960 and 2017.

The demographics of Mozambique describes the condition and overview of Mozambique's peoples. Demographic topics include basic education, health, and population statistics as well as identified racial and religious affiliations.

== Population ==
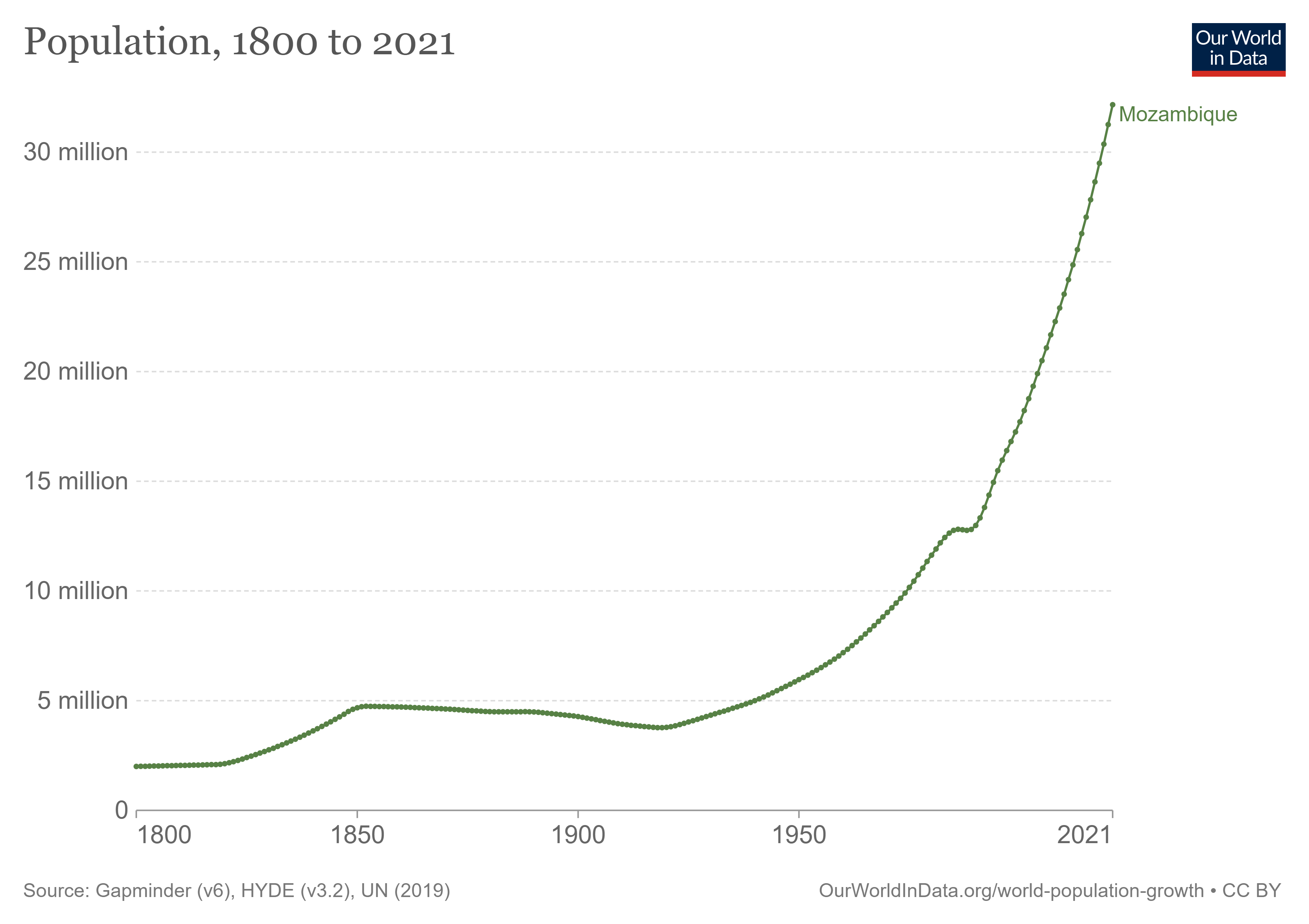
Demographics of Mozambique, Data of Our World in Data, year 2022; Number of inhabitants in millions.

According to the 2022 revision of the world factbook the total population was 31,693,239 in 2022. In 2020, 45.57% of the population was 14 years of age or younger, 51.5% was between 15 and 65 years of age, and 2.93% was 65 years or older. A population census took place in 2017, and the preliminary results indicate a population of 28 861 863 inhabitants.

	Total population	Population aged 0–14 (%)	Population aged 15–64 (%)	Population aged 65+ (%)
1950	6 442 000	41.7	55.6	2.7
1955	6 972 000	41.9	55.4	2.7
1960	7 647 000	42.3	55.0	2.8
1965	8 474 000	42.9	54.3	2.8
1970	9 453 000	43.5	53.6	2.9
1975	10 620 000	43.8	53.2	3.0
1980	12 146 000	43.8	53.1	3.0
1985	13 335 000	44.7	52.2	3.1
1990	13 547 000	46.6	50.2	3.3
1995	15 933 000	44.2	52.7	3.1
2000	18 201 000	43.9	53.0	3.2
2005	20 770 000	44.4	52.4	3.2
2010	23 391 000	44.1	52.6	3.3
2020	30 098 197	45.6	51.5	2.9

Population Estimates by Sex and Age Group (01.VII.2020) (Data refer to national projections based on 2007 census.):

Age group	Male	Female	Total	%
Total	14 501 196	15 565 452	30 066 648	100
0–4	2 315 310	2 295 586	4 610 896	15.34
5–9	2 487 720	2 531 664	5 019 384	16.69
10–14	2 076 198	2 067 546	4 143 744	13.78
15–19	1 594 940	1 630 074	3 225 014	10.73
20–24	1 264 746	1 481 775	2 746 521	9.13
25–29	1 000 516	1 222 754	2 223 270	7.39
30–34	802 315	906 767	1 709 082	5.68
35–39	673 119	774 993	1 448 112	4.82
40–44	574 984	660 820	1 235 804	4.11
45–49	454 062	504 057	958 119	3.19
50–54	343 740	397 999	741 739	2.47
55–59	264 107	302 253	566 360	1.88
60–64	203 386	229 467	432 853	1.44
65-69	159 568	188 765	348 333	1.16
70-74	109 258	134 617	243 875	0.81
75-79	69 868	89 298	159 166	0.53
80+	107 359	147 017	254 376	0.85
Age group	Male	Female	Total	Percent
0–14	6 879 228	6 894 796	13 774 024	45.81
15–64	7 175 915	8 110 959	15 286 874	50.84
65+	446 053	559 697	1 005 750	3.35

== Vital statistics ==
Population, fertility rate and net reproduction rate, United Nations estimates

Registration of vital events is not complete in Mozambique. The website Our World in Data prepared the following estimates based on statistics from the Population Department of the United Nations.

	Mid-year population	Live births	Deaths	Natural change	Crude birth rate (per 1000)	Crude death rate (per 1000)	Natural change (per 1000)	Total fertility rate (TFR)	Infant mortality (per 1000 live births)	Life expectancy (in years)
1950	5,920,000	277,000	160,000	117,000	46.7	27.0	19.7	5.99	204.4	37.26
1951	6,002,000	280,000	160,000	120,000	46.5	26.6	19.9	6.02	203.0	37.49
1952	6,082,000	284,000	159,000	125,000	46.5	26.1	20.4	6.06	200.2	37.93
1953	6,160,000	287,000	159,000	128,000	46.4	25.6	20.8	6.09	197.3	38.33
1954	6,237,000	291,000	158,000	133,000	46.4	25.2	21.2	6.11	194.5	38.77
1955	6,319,000	295,000	158,000	137,000	46.4	24.8	21.6	6.14	191.6	39.18
1956	6,404,000	299,000	157,000	141,000	46.4	24.4	22.0	6.16	188.8	39.63
1957	6,493,000	303,000	157,000	146,000	46.5	24.1	22.4	6.18	186.0	40.02
1958	6,580,000	307,000	157,000	150,000	46.4	23.7	22.7	6.19	183.3	40.46
1959	6,676,000	314,000	157,000	157,000	46.9	23.4	23.5	6.24	180.8	40.85
1960	6,788,000	322,000	158,000	164,000	47.3	23.2	24.1	6.32	178.5	41.22
1961	6,918,000	329,000	159,000	170,000	47.5	22.9	24.6	6.38	176.6	41.59
1962	7,060,000	337,000	161,000	176,000	47.7	22.8	24.9	6.45	175.1	41.83
1963	7,210,000	345,000	164,000	181,000	47.7	22.7	25.0	6.49	174.1	41.93
1964	7,364,000	351,000	169,000	182,000	47.6	22.9	24.7	6.52	174.0	41.67
1965	7,524,000	357,000	172,000	186,000	47.4	22.8	24.6	6.55	173.8	41.70
1966	7,690,000	365,000	176,000	189,000	47.4	22.8	24.6	6.59	173.9	41.64
1967	7,859,000	372,000	179,000	193,000	47.3	22.7	24.5	6.63	174.0	41.66
1968	8,036,000	380,000	183,000	197,000	47.2	22.7	24.5	6.67	174.2	41.67
1969	8,218,000	389,000	186,000	202,000	47.2	22.6	24.6	6.71	174.2	41.71
1970	8,412,000	396,000	190,000	206,000	47.1	22.5	24.5	6.72	174.0	41.76
1971	8,623,000	403,000	194,000	210,000	46.8	22.5	24.3	6.72	174.3	41.74
1972	8,861,000	413,000	199,000	214,000	46.8	22.5	24.3	6.74	173.5	41.59
1973	9,124,000	426,000	204,000	222,000	46.8	22.4	24.4	6.73	173.1	41.71
1974	9,404,000	441,000	208,000	233,000	47.0	22.1	24.8	6.71	172.6	42.07
1975	9,704,000	457,000	211,000	246,000	47.2	21.8	25.4	6.69	171.6	42.58
1976	10,019,000	474,000	218,000	257,000	47.5	21.8	25.7	6.66	171.2	42.64
1977	10,364,000	493,000	225,000	268,000	47.8	21.8	26.0	6.64	171.0	42.70
1978	10,741,000	515,000	233,000	283,000	48.2	21.8	26.4	6.61	170.7	42.80
1979	11,128,000	539,000	243,000	296,000	48.6	21.9	26.7	6.58	170.8	42.74
1980	11,414,000	559,000	251,000	308,000	48.7	21.9	26.8	6.52	170.8	42.80
1981	11,640,000	563,000	277,000	286,000	48.3	23.8	24.6	6.46	181.4	40.54
1982	11,902,000	570,000	280,000	290,000	47.8	23.5	24.4	6.40	180.6	40.70
1983	12,163,000	580,000	284,000	297,000	47.7	23.3	24.4	6.39	179.6	40.83
1984	12,426,000	593,000	311,000	282,000	47.6	25.0	22.7	6.40	178.2	38.38
1985	12,680,000	602,000	313,000	289,000	47.4	24.7	22.7	6.38	176.6	38.66
1986	12,910,000	612,000	295,000	317,000	47.2	22.8	24.4	6.36	164.8	40.68
1987	12,965,000	621,000	298,000	323,000	47.1	22.6	24.5	6.34	163.0	40.84
1988	12,957,000	614,000	269,000	345,000	46.9	20.6	26.3	6.30	161.3	43.84
1989	13,088,000	616,000	268,000	348,000	46.7	20.3	26.4	6.28	159.6	44.14
1990	13,303,000	619,000	268,000	352,000	46.4	20.0	26.3	6.22	158.0	44.47
1991	13,561,000	626,000	270,000	356,000	46.0	19.8	26.2	6.16	156.2	44.66
1992	13,817,000	632,000	271,000	361,000	45.6	19.5	26.0	6.10	154.0	44.95
1993	14,206,000	640,000	270,000	370,000	45.3	19.1	26.2	6.03	151.3	45.35
1994	14,913,000	659,000	276,000	383,000	44.9	18.9	26.1	5.96	147.9	45.61
1995	15,595,000	693,000	287,000	406,000	44.5	18.4	26.1	5.90	143.8	46.04
1996	16,080,000	711,000	287,000	424,000	44.3	17.9	26.4	5.85	138.9	46.64
1997	16,522,000	736,000	287,000	449,000	44.4	17.3	27.1	5.89	133.4	47.41
1998	16,923,000	749,000	285,000	464,000	44.2	16.8	27.4	5.86	127.6	48.02
1999	17,338,000	764,000	282,000	483,000	44.0	16.2	27.8	5.83	121.5	48.81
2000	17,769,000	779,000	279,000	499,000	43.7	15.7	28.1	5.81	115.9	49.49
2001	18,221,000	792,000	277,000	515,000	43.4	15.2	28.2	5.78	110.0	50.07
2002	18,695,000	806,000	276,000	530,000	43.0	14.7	28.3	5.73	105.0	50.59
2003	19,187,000	824,000	277,000	547,000	42.9	14.4	28.5	5.73	100.5	50.87
2004	19,694,000	834,000	277,000	557,000	42.3	14.1	28.2	5.67	96.3	51.25
2005	20,211,000	847,000	278,000	569,000	41.9	13.8	28.1	5.61	92.6	51.56
2006	20,736,000	860,000	278,000	582,000	41.4	13.4	28.0	5.55	89.0	51.96
2007	21,281,000	876,000	275,000	600,000	41.1	12.9	28.2	5.51	84.5	52.57
2008	21,846,000	911,000	274,000	636,000	41.6	12.5	29.1	5.58	80.8	53.16
2009	22,437,000	942,000	273,000	669,000	41.9	12.1	29.8	5.63	77.3	53.79
2010	23,074,000	970,000	275,000	695,000	42.0	11.9	30.1	5.63	75.8	54.20
2011	23,760,000	989,000	273,000	716,000	41.6	11.5	30.1	5.55	72.9	54.87
2012	24,488,000	1,006,000	269,000	737,000	41.1	11.0	30.1	5.45	70.2	55.64
2013	25,252,000	1,024,000	265,000	759,000	40.5	10.5	30.1	5.34	67.7	56.49
2014	26,039,000	1,021,000	260,000	761,000	39.3	10.0	29.2	5.13	65.2	57.27
2015	26,843,000	1,041,000	255,000	786,000	38.8	9.5	29.3	5.06	62.3	58.15
2016	27,696,000	1,063,000	250,000	813,000	38.4	9.0	29.4	4.99	59.9	59.04
2017	28,569,000	1,089,000	248,000	841,000	38.1	8.7	29.4	4.92	58.3	59.77
2018	29,424,000	1,111,000	245,000	866,000	37.8	8.3	29.4	4.85	56.7	60.53
2019	29,884,000	1,169,000	241,000	928,000	37.3	8.0	29.3	5.02	55.0	61.3
2020	30,784,000	1,192,000	246,000	948,000	37.0	8.0	29.0	4.96	53.4	61.4
2021	31,708,000	1,218,000	266,000	951,000	36.6	8.8	27.8	4.91	52.0	60.3
2022	32,656,000	1,241,000	237,000	1,004,000	37.8	8.3	29.4	4.84	56.7	63.0
2023	33,635,000	1,261,000	236,000	1,025,000	37.8	7.0	30.5	4.76	56.7	63.6

Also, according to a 2011 survey, the total fertility rate was 5.9 children per woman, with 6.6 in rural areas and 4.5 in urban areas.

=== Demographic and Health Surveys ===
Total Fertility Rate (TFR) (Wanted Fertility Rate) and Crude Birth Rate (CBR):

Year	Total		Urban		Rural	
Year	CBR	TFR	CBR	TFR	CBR	TFR
1997		5.2 (4.7)		4.6 (4.1)		5.3 (4.9)
2003	40	5.5 (4.9)	31	4.4 (3.8)	49	6.1 (5.5)
2011	41.6	5.9 (5.1)	37.4	4.5 (3.8)	43.4	6.6 (5.8)
2015	38.0	5.3	30.8	3.6	41.2	6.1
2018	37.5	5.4	31.2	3.9	40.2	6.2
2022-23	34.5	4.9 (4.2)	28.8	3.6 (3.1)	37.3	5.8 (5.0)

Fertility data by province (DHS Program):

Province	Total fertility rate (2011)	Total fertility rate (2015)	Total fertility rate (2018)	Total fertility rate (2022-23)
Niassa	7.1	6.6	6.4	6.8
Cabo Delgado	6.6	5.6	6.1	6.2
Nampula	6.1	5.2	6.0	5.8
Zambézia	6.8	6.3	6.2	5.1
Tete	6.8	6.2	6.0	5.1
Manica	5.8	6.2	5.8	5.5
Sofala	6.1	6.0	6.4	4.9
Inhambane	4.9	4.3	4.1	4.0
Gaza	5.3	4.7	4.1	3.7
Maputo Província	4.1	3.4	3.0	2.8
Maputo Cidade	3.1	2.5	2.2	2.1

View source data.
View source data.
View source data.
View source data.

=== Life expectancy ===
Development of life expectancy

Life expectancy
Period	Life expectancy in years
1950–1955	31.29
1955–1960	▲33.79
1960–1965	▲36.18
1965–1970	▲38.14
1970–1975	▲40.37
1975–1980	▲42.21
1980–1985	▼41.47
1985–1990	▲42.33
1990–1995	▲43.90
1995–2000	▲47.21
2000–2005	▲49.56
2005–2010	▲53.24
2010–2015	▲56.08

== Ethnic groups ==
Mozambique's major ethnic groups encompass numerous subgroups with diverse languages, dialects, cultures, and histories. Many are linked to similar ethnic groups living in inland countries. The estimated 4 million Makua are the largest ethnic group of the country and are dominant in the northern part of the country — the Sena and Shona (mostly Ndau and Manyika) are prominent in the Zambezi valley, and the Tsonga dominate in southern Mozambique. Other groups include Makonde, Yao, Swahili, Tonga, Chopi, and Nguni (including Zulu). The country is also home to a growing number of white residents, most with Portuguese ancestry. During colonial rule, European residents hailed from every Mozambican province, and at the time of independence the total population was estimated at around 360,000. Most vacated the region after independence in 1975, emigrating to Portugal as retornados. There is also a larger mestiço minority with mixed African and Portuguese heritage. The remaining non-Blacks in Mozambique are primarily Indian Asiatics, who have arrived from Pakistan, Portuguese India, and numerous Arab descents. There are various estimates for the size of Mozambique's Chinese community, ranging from 1,500 to 12,000 as of 2007.

Ethnic groups in Mozambique
Ethnic group	Census 2017	
Ethnic group	Number	%
Black	26,637,425	99.03%
Mestiço	212,540	0.79%
White	22,258	0.08%
Indian	15,492	0.06%
Pakistani	4,423	0.02%
Chinese	1,746	0.01%
Other	5,221	0.02%
Total	26,899,105	

== Languages ==
Languages of Mozambique (2017)
Languages	percent
Emakhuwa	26.1%
Portuguese	16.6%
Xitsonga	8.6%
Nyanja	8.1%
Cisena	7.1%
Elomwe	7.1%
Echuwabo	4.7%
Cindau	3.8%
Xitswa	3.8%
Other Mozambican	11.8%
Other	0.5%
Unspecified	1.8%

Portuguese is the official and most widely spoken language of the nation, but in 2017 only 47.4% of Mozambique's population speak Portuguese as either their first or second language, and only 16.6% speak Portuguese as their first language. Arabs, Chinese, and Indians speak their own languages (Indians from Portuguese India speak any of the Portuguese Creoles of their origin) aside from Portuguese as their second language. Most educated Mozambicans speak English, which is used in schools and business as second or third language.

== Religion ==
Religions of Mozambique (2015)
Religions	percent
Roman Catholic	30.5%
Islam	19.3%
Protestant	18.4%
Zionist Christian	10.3%
Evangelical/Pentecostal	9.5%
None	9.9%
Other	1.4%
Anglican	0.8%

== Culture ==
Despite the influence of Islamic coastal traders and European colonizers, the people of Mozambique have largely retained an indigenous culture based on smallscale agriculture. Mozambique's most highly developed art forms have been wood sculpture, for which the Makonde in northern Mozambique are particularly renowned, and dance. The middle and upper classes continue to be heavily influenced by the Portuguese colonial and linguistic heritage.

== Education and health ==
Under Portugal, educational opportunities for poor Mozambicans were limited; 93% of the Bantu population was illiterate, and many could not speak Portuguese. In fact, most of today's political leaders were educated in missionary schools. After independence, the government placed a high priority on expanding education, which reduced the illiteracy rate to about two-thirds as primary school enrollment increased. Unfortunately, in recent years school construction and teacher training enrollments have not kept up with population increases. With post-war enrollments reaching all-time highs, the quality of education has suffered. As a member of Commonwealth of Nations, most urban Mozambicans are required to learn English starting high-school.
