= Makonde =

Makonde may refer to:

- Makonde people, an ethnic group from East Africa
- Makonde art, the art of the Makonde people
- Makonde language, the language spoken by the Makonde people
- Makonde (District), a district of the Mashonaland West province of Zimbabwe
- Makonde Plateau, a plateau in the Mtwara Region of Tanzania. The adjacent Mueda Plateau in Mozambique is also referred to as the Makonde or Maconde plateau.
