= Mueda campaign =

Mueda campaign (1917)
- Part of the Campaigns of Pacification and Occupation
- German map of northern Mozambique
Date	1917
Location	Portuguese Mozambique
Result	Portuguese victory

Belligerents
(First Portuguese Republic) Portuguese Republic	Makonde tribes

Commanders and leaders
(First Portuguese Republic) José Augusto da Cunha (First Portuguese Republic) Neutel de Abreu	Unknown

Strength
2100 Makua soldiers	Unknown

The Mueda campaign of 1917 was a military operation undertaken by Portugal in the Mueda Plateau, also known as the Makonde Plateau, and one of the last Campaigns of Pacification and Occupation in Mozambique. It resulted in the definite integration of the region in Portuguese Mozambique.

== History ==
Portugal had been active in the effective occupation of the territory that is now Mozambique since 1895 and when the First World War broke out, the Portuguese government dispatched considerable reinforcements to the north of the territory to defend the border with German East Africa. A headquarters was established in Mocímboa da Praia but this location was found to be extremely unhealthy for the troops and so the Governor-General of Mozambique decided to relocate it to Chomba, in the middle of Makonde territory, who rejected Portuguese authority and could aid the Germans, and to where were no roads.

José Augusto da Cunha and Neutel de Abreu, old veterans specialists in the leading of native auxiliaries, where dispatched with a force of 2100 Makua soldiers to the territory to pacify the Makonde, build a road from Nambunde to Chombe and erect in this latter place a military post, 143 kilometers away. The Luso-Makua force was guided by a Makonde chief who wished to get revenge on his Makonde rivals. The journey to the objective was therefore tortuous and un-straightforward. According to Makonde oral tradition, this chief was Mbavala, chief of the Mwilu clan, who was then at war with the stronger clan Msitunguli. The forest was difficult to move through, the Luso-Makua column was faced with a lack of drinking water along the way and was constantly harassed by boas and venomous snakes.

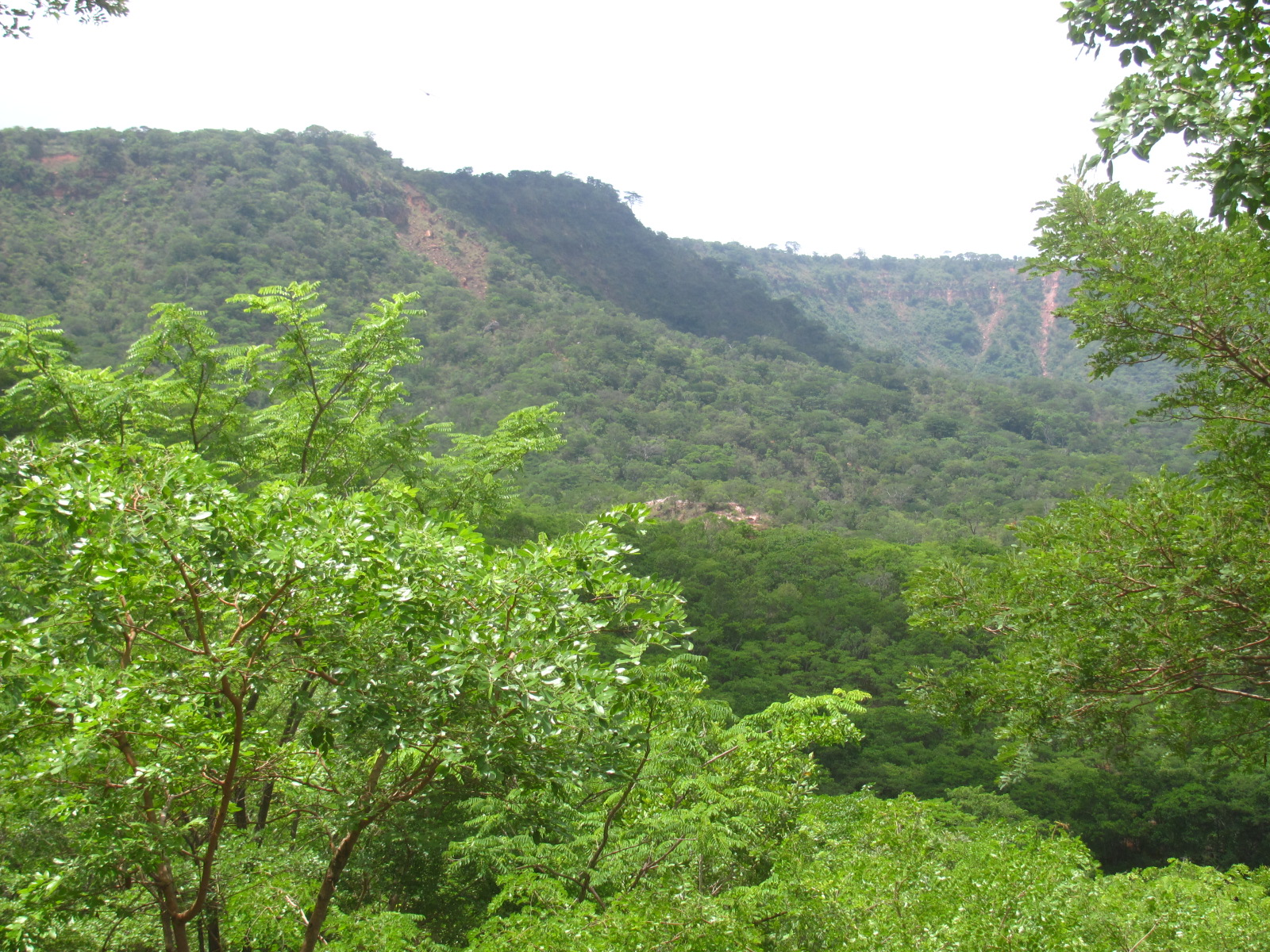
Escarpment on the Makonde Plateau.

Each Makonde village had around 70 to 200 huts and was fortified with tree trunks, moats, tunnels, and traps, but the chiefs did not unite and the fighting took place against scattered groups. The Portuguese column left Nambude on April 29, 1917, under the command of Augusto da Cunha, and there was violent fighting from the outset on May 1 to 3, with exchanges of fire in the virgin forest. The first major battle took place on May 14 in the village of Nacatar. The Portuguese column was attacked by the chiefs Cuinaca, Nhada, and Namije, and on May 17, it had to form a square. They spent the night of the 17th camped near the village of Nacume, which burned throughout the night. Further fighting took place on May 20, 23, 24, 25, 28, and 31, and on June 2, the column was in Mueda. The column arrived in Chomba on June 14.

From Chomba, there was further fighting on June 19, 29, and 30 against the chief of Mamamidia, and then on July 2, 11, 13, and 14. The battle in the village of Mahunda lasted from July 11 to 17. While it lasted, the village of Panabenane was also attacked on the 13th, and on that day the Portuguese and Macua soldiers were attacked by a swarm of bees. The chiefs Nanchechise, Ubulamala, Metubuina, Malupendo, Pananebane, Liugo, Pachalampa, and Colinga were, however, pacified, and on July 30, the road from Chomba to Mocímboa da Praia was open. A new column then arrived in Chomba to open a new road to Negomano.

From then on, most of the Makonde chiefs began visiting Portuguese military posts to sell supplies, but not all of them had yet been pacified. The plateau was not completely pacified until October 1920.

The Maconde were the last ethnic group to be integrated into Mozambique.

== See also ==
- Portugal during World War I
  - East African campaign (World War I)
