= Mwani people =

Mwani ethnic group in Mozambique

Wamwani
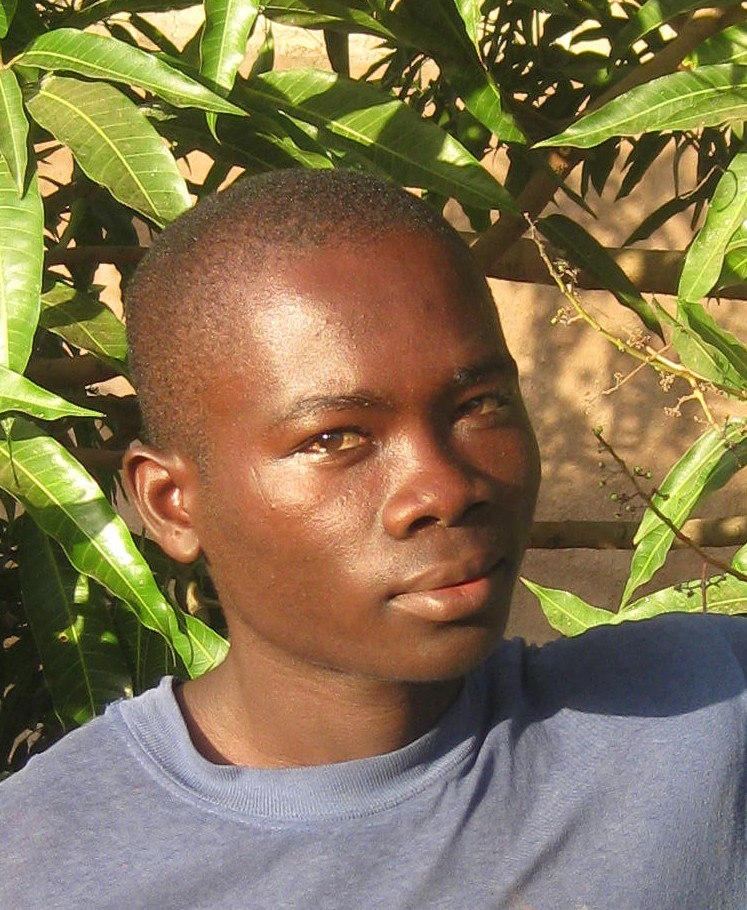

Regions with significant populations
- Mozambique: 120,000–200,000

Languages
- Kimwani (Native Language), Portuguese

Religion
- Islam

Related ethnic groups
- Bantu peoples; Swahilis; Makondes; Makuas; Yaos; Andondes; Vandondes; Chewas; Makwes

The Mwani people (Kimwani/Kiswahili: Wamwani; Portuguese: Muane) are a Bantu ethnic group primarily inhabiting the coastline of the Cabo Delgado Province of Mozambique. The Mwani people speak the Kimwani language, also known as the Ibo language, which is a Bantu language belonging to the Niger-Congo language family. They are often considered part of the Swahili cultural world as they have important connections with the East African coast (especially coastal Tanzania and Zanzibar)

== Ethnonym ==
- Person: Mwani
- People: Wamwani
- Language: Kimwani
- Country: Umwani

The ethnonym Mwani is commonly translated as "people of the coast" or "(at) the coast," referring to the coastal environment the Mwani live in. This ethnonym appears to be a loan translation of the term Swahili, which has a similar meaning. In Kiswahili, Mwani means seaweed.

The ethnonym Mwani can also be written as Muane or Mwane.

== Demography & Distribution ==
In modern times, the Mwani number around 120,000-200,000 people and live mainly in Cabo Delgado Province. They make up 5.2%-8.6% of Cabo Delgado's total population of 2.3 million. In Cabo Delagado, the Mwani mainly live in the coastal districts (Mocímboa da Praia District, Quirimbas Islands, Vamizi Island, Ibo District, Pemba District, Palma, etc.). In Cabo Delgado's Mocímboa da Praia town, around 70% of the 40,000 inhabitants is Mwani. Ibo Island is considered by the Mwani to be an important cultural center, however the Mwani do not form a majority of the population there. Instead, the population is diverse and includes ethnic groups like the Makwe, Portuguese, Indian, Makhua, Omani, and Mwani. The Mwani form a significant minority of the population of Pemba, which is majority Makhua. Palma, a Mozambican beach town, has a majority Mwani population. A small number of Mwani also live in Tanzania.

Some coastal Mwani villages claim to be of Shirazi lineage. However, it is difficult to ascertain these claims due to intermarriage with other predominantly Muslim groups. Hence, it is possible that these Mwani villages are of Shirazi descent, but they could also have Comorian origins.
