= Reinata Sadimba =

Mozambican ceramicist

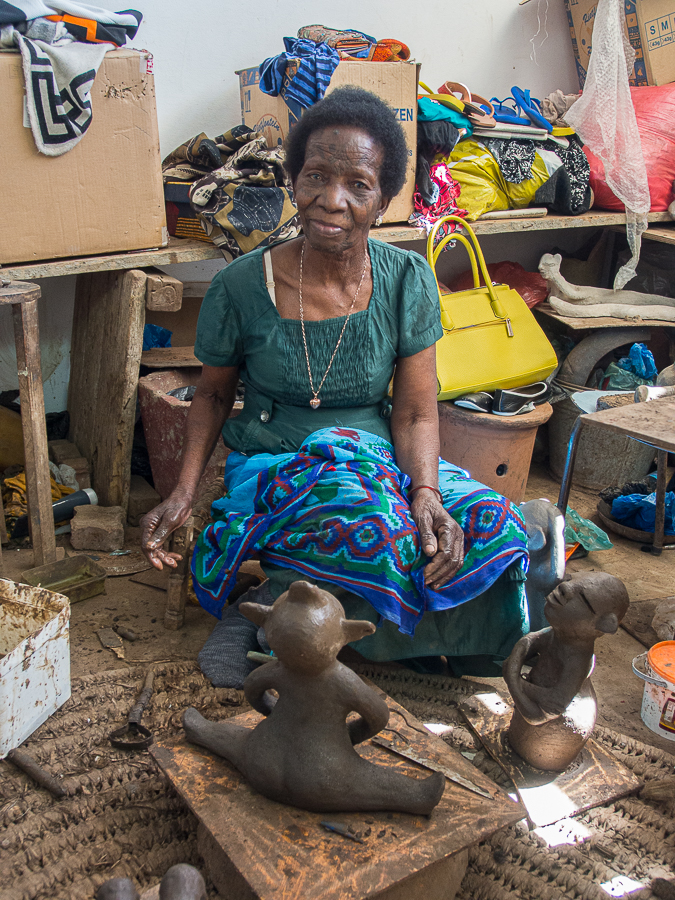
- Reinata Sadimba at her workshop on the premises of the Mozambique Natural History Museum in 2017
- Born: 1945 (age 80–81); Nemu, Mueda, Mozambique
- Occupation: Ceramicist

Reinata Sadimba (born 1945) is a Mozambican ceramicist who produces work that originates in traditional Makonde pottery, while incorporating her own techniques and conceptions of femininity and motherhood. She is considered among the most important contemporary sculptors in Mozambique.

== Biography ==
Reinata Sadimba was born in Nemu, a village in Mueda, Mozambique, in 1945. She received a traditional Makonde education, which included making useful objects out of clay. She learned the art of ceramics from her mother, with the initial aim of providing for her family after her father died when she was very young. However, she eventually found that working with clay allowed her to "say things that I did not know how to express in any other way."

As a young woman, Sadimba joined FRELIMO, an armed resistance movement to Portuguese rule in Mozambique that began in 1964. After the Mozambican War of Independence, the country gained independent status in 1975.

Sadimba's work is marked by her own personal experiences. Married young and twice divorced, she had eight children, only one of whom survived. After leaving an abusive marriage in 1975, Sadimba revolutionized her work, beginning to add personalized elements that distinguished her pieces from other Makonde ceramics.

In the 1980s, she collaborated on a rural project with a Swiss couple who had settled close to Mueda, where she was living at the time. This project brought more visibility to her work. However, as the Mozambican Civil War raged, she emigrated in 1985 with her only son to Tanzania, where she lived in Dar es Salaam with her sister Josefina. It was there that she began to exhibit her work in small galleries and artisanal markets.

The Swiss couple's continued support gave her the financial stability to experiment artistically with new techniques and sculpt according to her own aesthetic and imagination. During her time in Tanzania, she further developed her stylistic depiction of the human form, while still reflecting the Makonde matrilineal universe.

In 1992, after the war's end, she returned to Mozambique and settled in Maputo. There, she received significant support from Augusto Cabral, then the director of the Mozambique Natural History Museum, and she established a studio within the museum. In 1998, her work was featured during a weeklong educational program on traditional ceramics at the museum.

In her work, Sadimba uses clay as well as white limestone and graphite, which gives her pieces their characteristic green color. She creates jugs, pots, and anthropomorphic forms, which often display scarifications or cultural marks typical of the Makonde people. Sadimba herself has a tattooed face, in keeping with Makonde tradition. Her ceramics contain layers of meaning and make reference to stories and legends of her home province, often depicting femininity, motherhood, or childbirth. She is also known for producing pieces incredibly quickly.

Sadimba's work has been exhibited both in Mozambique and abroad, including in South Africa, Italy, Switzerland, Portugal, and France. In 2022, she was named a Commander of the Order of Prince Henry by the president of Portugal.
