= EPM =

EPM may refer to:

== Education ==
- École Polytechnique de Montréal, now Polytechnique Montréal, an engineering school in Canada
- Escola Portuguesa de Moçambique, a Portuguese school in Maputo, Mozambique
- Macau Portuguese School (Portuguese: Escola Portuguesa de Macau)

== Management ==
- Enterprise performance management
- Enterprise project management

== Music ==
- "E. P. M. (Extreme Power Metal)", a song by DragonForce from their 2008 album Ultra Beatdown
- Extreme Power Metal, a 2019 album by DragonForce
- EPM Musique, a French record label

== Science and technology ==
- Electronic protective measures
- Electropermanent magnet
- Electropositive metal, in electropositive shark repellent
- Elevated plus maze, a rodent-based model of anxiety
- Equine protozoal myeloencephalitis
- Ethylene propylene rubber
- European Physiology Modules, an International Space Station payload
- Evolved psychological mechanism
- Expanding photosphere method

== Other uses ==
- EPM (cycling team), a Colombian cycling team
- Eastport Municipal Airport, in Maine, United States
- Empresas Públicas de Medellín, a Colombian public utility
- An Enquiry Concerning the Principles of Morals, a 1751 book by Scottish philosopher David Hume
- Epsom railway station, Victoria
- European Peace Marches
- Macau Prison (Portuguese: Estabelecimento Prisional de Macau)
- Pyrenees–Mediterranean Euroregion (French: Eurorégion Pyrénées–Méditerannée)
