= XNQ =

XNQ may refer to:

- Fairchild XNQ, an American trainer for the United States Navy
- ISO 639:xnq, the ISO 639 code for the Ngoni language
