= Makwe language =

Bantu language of Tanzania and Mozambique

Makwe
- Kimakwe
- Native to: Mozambique, Tanzania
- Region: Cabo Delgado Province, Mtwara Region
- Ethnicity: Makwe
- Native speakers: 150,000 (2009–2017)
- Language family: Niger–Congo?: Atlantic–Congo; Benue–Congo; Bantoid; Bantu; Northeast Coast Bantu; Sabaki; Swahili; Makwe

Language codes
- ISO 639-3: ymk
- Glottolog: makw1236
- Guthrie code: G.402
- ELP: Makwe

The Makwe or Macue language (Kimakwe) is a close relative of Swahili spoken on the coast of the Cabo Delgado Province of Mozambique, and across the border in Mtwara Region of Tanzania. Although it shares high lexical similarity (60%) with Swahili, it is not intelligible with it, nor with its cousin Mwani. Arends et al. suggest it might turn out to be a Makonde–Swahili mixed language.

A grammar of the Makwe language by Maud Devos was published in 2008.
