= Makombé =

Makombé may refer to:

- The Makombé River in Cameroon
- WASP-69b, an exoplanet named Makombé
- Makombe, the title of the rulers of the Kingdom of Barue

== See also ==
- Shayne Makombe
- Makonde
