= WMW =

WMW or wmw may refer to:

- WMW, the National Rail station code for Walthamstow Queen's Road railway station, London, England
- wmw, the ISO 639-3 code for Mwani language, Mozambique
