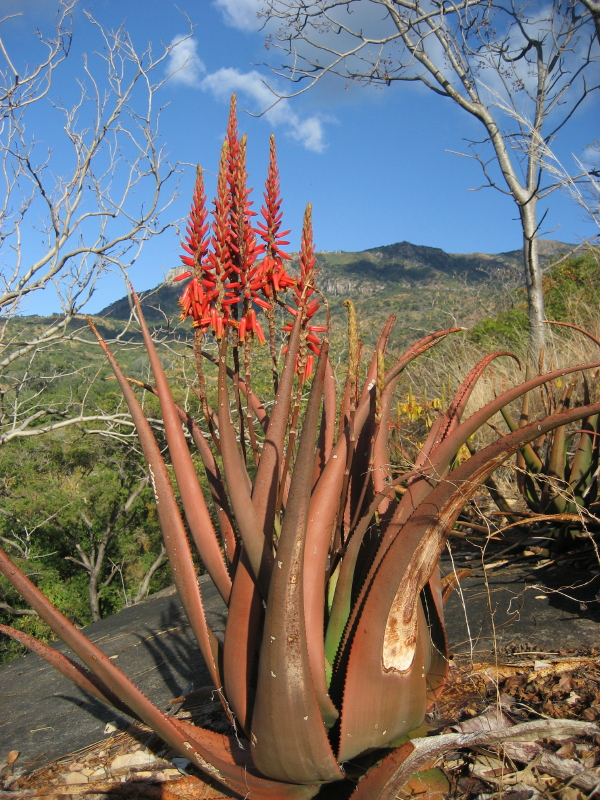
- Aloe cryptopoda photographed at Mount Gorongosa in Mozambique

Conservation status
- CITES Appendix II

Scientific classification
- Kingdom: Plantae
- Clade: Embryophytes
- Clade: Tracheophytes
- Clade: Angiosperms
- Clade: Monocots
- Order: Asparagales
- Family: Asphodelaceae
- Subfamily: Asphodeloideae
- Genus: Aloe
- Species: A. cryptopoda

Binomial name
- Aloe cryptopoda Baker

Synonyms
- Aloe wickensii var. lutea Reynolds

= Aloe cryptopoda =

Species of succulent plant

Aloe cryptopoda is a species of succulent plant in the genus Aloe. It is native to Botswana, Malawi, Mozambique, Zambia, and Zimbabwe.

== Taxonomy and names ==
Aloe cryptopoda was described by English botanist John Gilbert Baker in 1884 based on a type specimen from Mozambique. The specific epithet cryptopoda is derived from the Greek words kryptos, meaning "hidden" or "covered", and podos, meaning "foot", in reference to the large bracts that cover the flower pedicels.

In English, it is commonly known as Dr Kirk's aloe, spire aloe, or yellow aloe, while in Nyanja it is known as chitembwe, citembwe, citupa, lichongwe, or licongwe. It is also known as mdyang'oma in Ngoni, gave wamtchanga in Sena, chikowa in Shona, and chinyangami in Tonga.

== Distribution and habitat ==
Aloe cryptopoda is known from Botswana, Malawi, Mozambique, Zambia, and Zimbabwe, where it grows on inselbergs and rocky slopes with little or no grass cover at altitudes of 60–1,525 m (197–5,003 ft) above sea level.
