= Mueda =

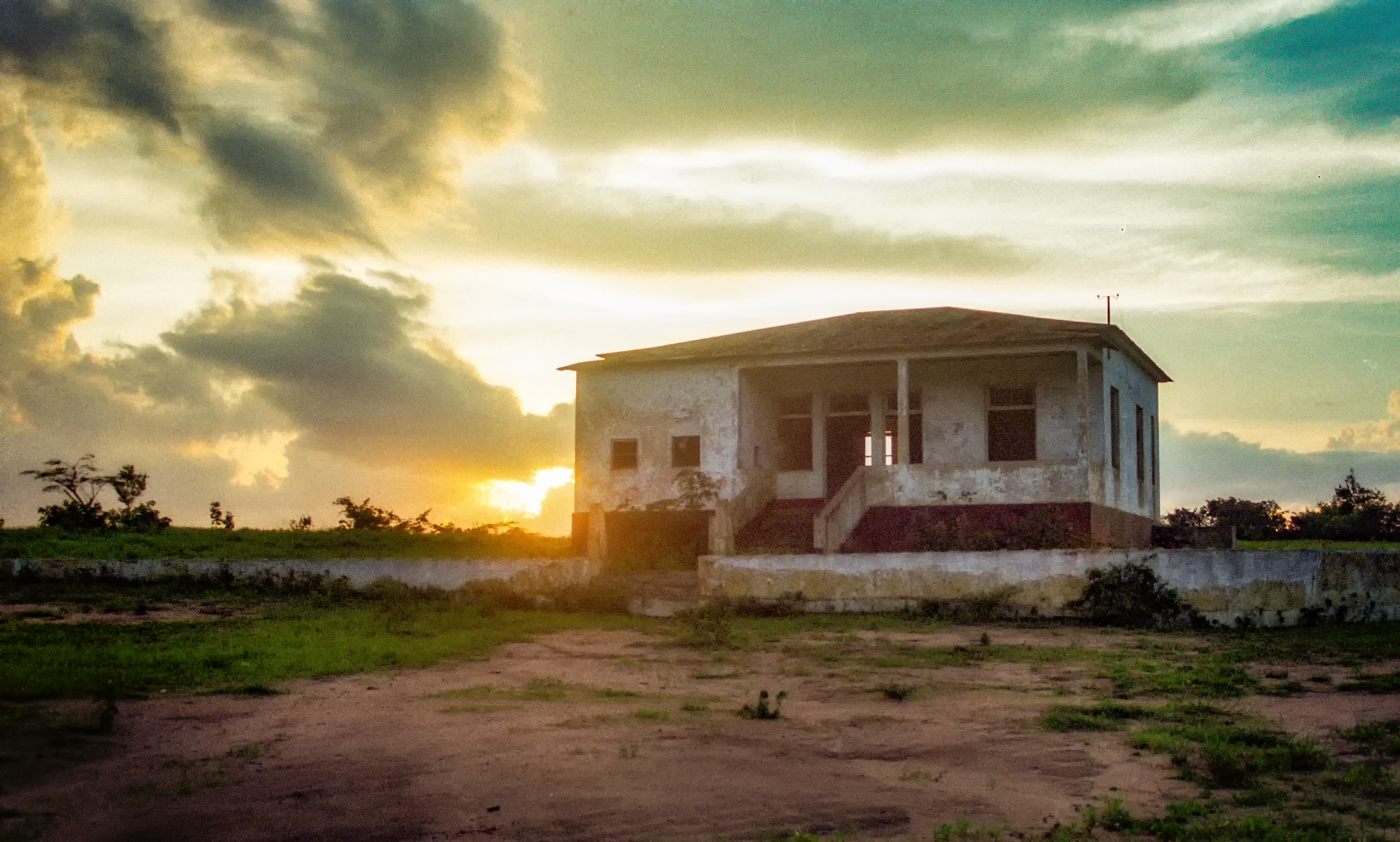
- Mueda Town Square, site of the 1960 massacre

- Location within Mozambique
- Coordinates: 11°38′S 39°37′E
- Country: Mozambique
- Provinces: Cabo Delgado Province
- District: Mueda District
- Elevation: 249 m (817 ft)

Mueda [ˈmwɛða] is the largest town of the Makonde Plateau in northeastern Mozambique. It is the capital of the Mueda District in Cabo Delgado Province. It is the center of the culture of the Makondes, and the production of their ebony sculptures.

== Geography ==
Mueda is located on the upland Mueda Plateau, which has a more temperate climate than the coast, but where, because of the permeable sandy soil, water infiltrates to a great depth, making it difficult to supply drinking water. In about 1970, Portugal, the ruling authority of Mozambique at the time, built a system to supply drinkable water, under the direction of the engineer Canhoto. In the 1980s, after the independence of Mozambique from Portugal, the system was rebuilt by the Mozambican government, with the assistance of UNICEF and Swiss co-operation.

== Climate ==
Climate data for Mueda
Month	Jan	Feb	Mar	Apr	May	Jun	Jul	Aug	Sep	Oct	Nov	Dec	Year
Mean daily maximum °C (°F)	28 (82)	28 (82)	27 (81)	26 (79)	26 (78)	24 (76)	24 (76)	25 (77)	27 (80)	28 (83)	29 (85)	29 (84)	27 (80)
Mean daily minimum °C (°F)	18 (65)	19 (66)	18 (65)	17 (63)	16 (61)	14 (57)	13 (56)	13 (56)	14 (58)	16 (61)	17 (63)	18 (64)	16 (61)
Average precipitation mm (inches)	270 (10.6)	220 (8.6)	230 (9.2)	120 (4.9)	23 (0.9)	5.1 (0.2)	0 (0)	2.5 (0.1)	2.5 (0.1)	5.1 (0.2)	41 (1.6)	180 (6.9)	1,100 (43.4)
Source: Weatherbase

== History ==
Mueda was founded around a Portuguese colonial army barracks.

=== Massacre of Mueda ===
On 16 June 1960, Makonde nationalists organized a demonstration in front of the Mueda District headquarters on the Mueda town square in order to demand independence from Portugal. Apparently the district administrator had invited them to present their grievances. The administrator ordered the leaders arrested, and the crowd protested. The Portuguese administrator ordered his pre-assembled troops to fire on the crowd, after which many more were thrown to their death into a ravine. The number of dead is in dispute. However, resentment generated by these events ultimately led to the independentist guerrilla organization FRELIMO gaining needed momentum at the outset of the Mozambican War of Independence (1964–1975). The site of the massacre is marked by a commemorative statue.

=== War for independence ===
The Makonde were strong supporters of FRELIMO. In fact, the Makonde African National Union (MANU - later Mozambique African National Union) was one of the three founding organizations of FRELIMO. Mueda was also the site of Portuguese operations against FRELIMO. In 1967, in one of its first major military actions, FRELIMO launched an abortive attack against the airbase there, although the base was seriously damaged. In May 1970, General Arriaga began Operation Gordian Knot, headquartered out of Mueda. By the end of the operation, he claimed to have eliminated over seventy FRELIMO bases. However, other than loss of equipment and supplies, the operation did not affect FRELIMO's ability to infiltrate additional arms from Tanzania, and did not substantially affect their ability to wage war. In a later attack, in 1972, against the Mueda airbase, all nineteen airplanes were destroyed.

== Images from Mueda ==
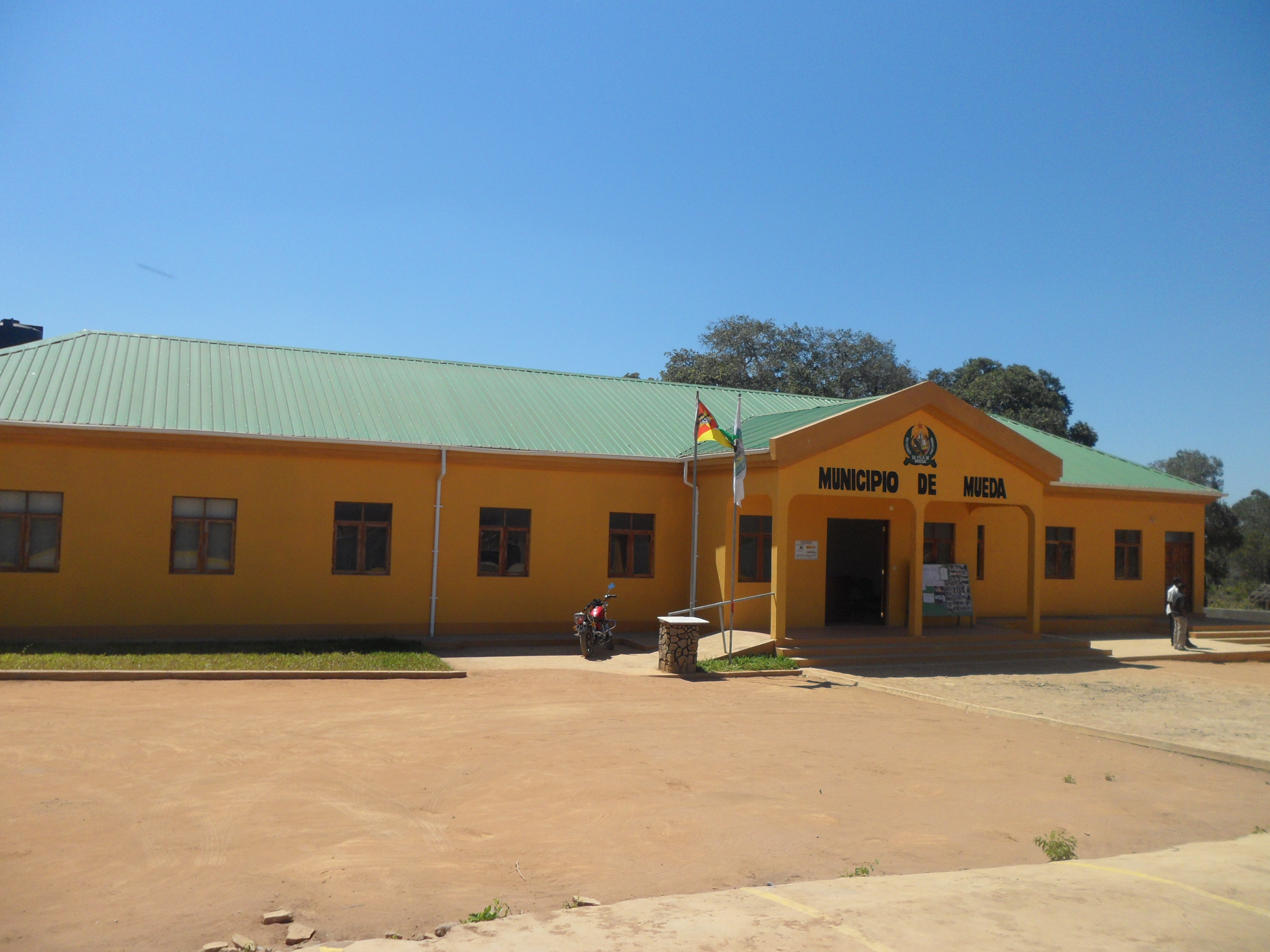
Mueda Municipality Building

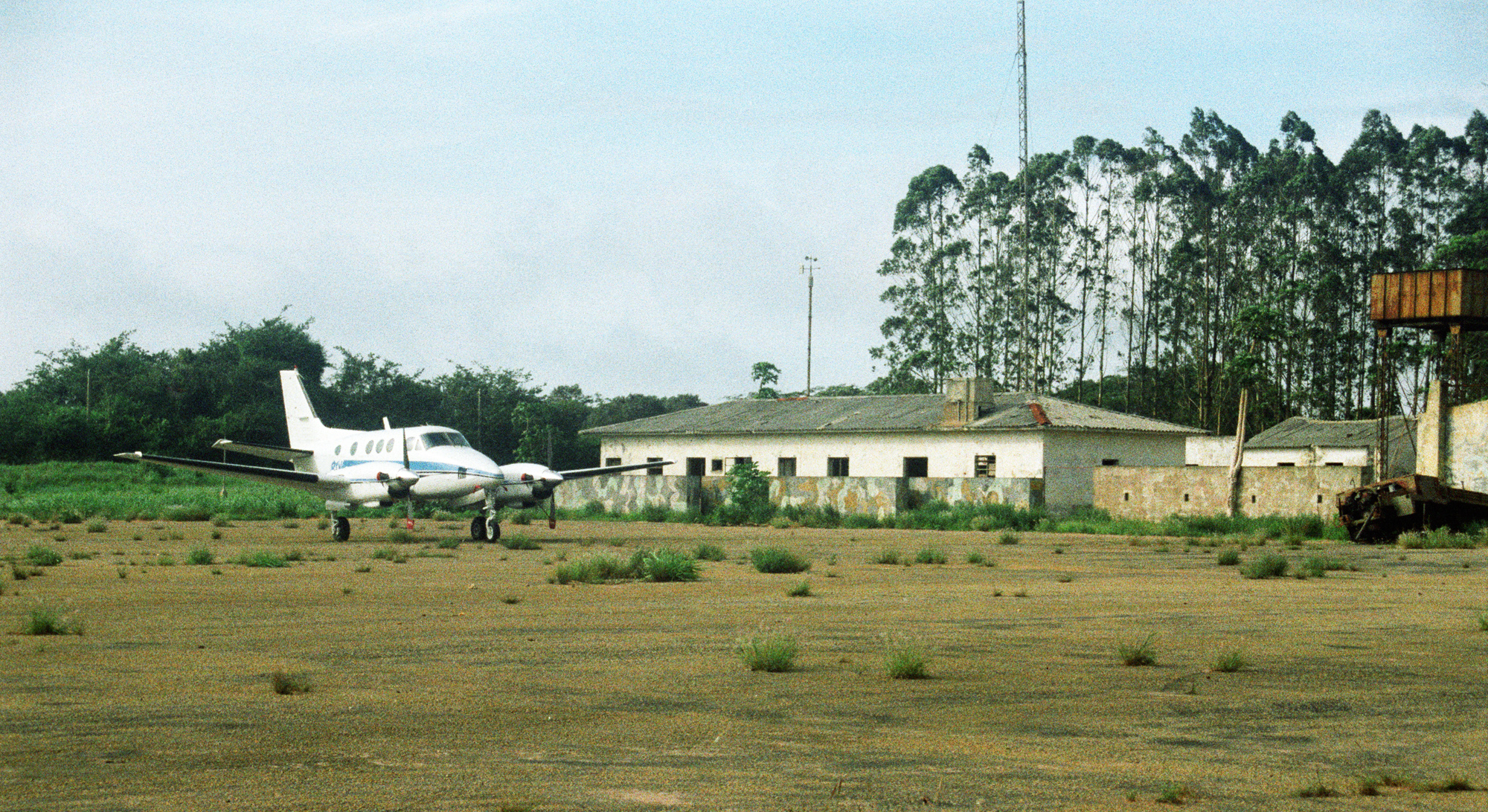
Mueda Airport c. 1995

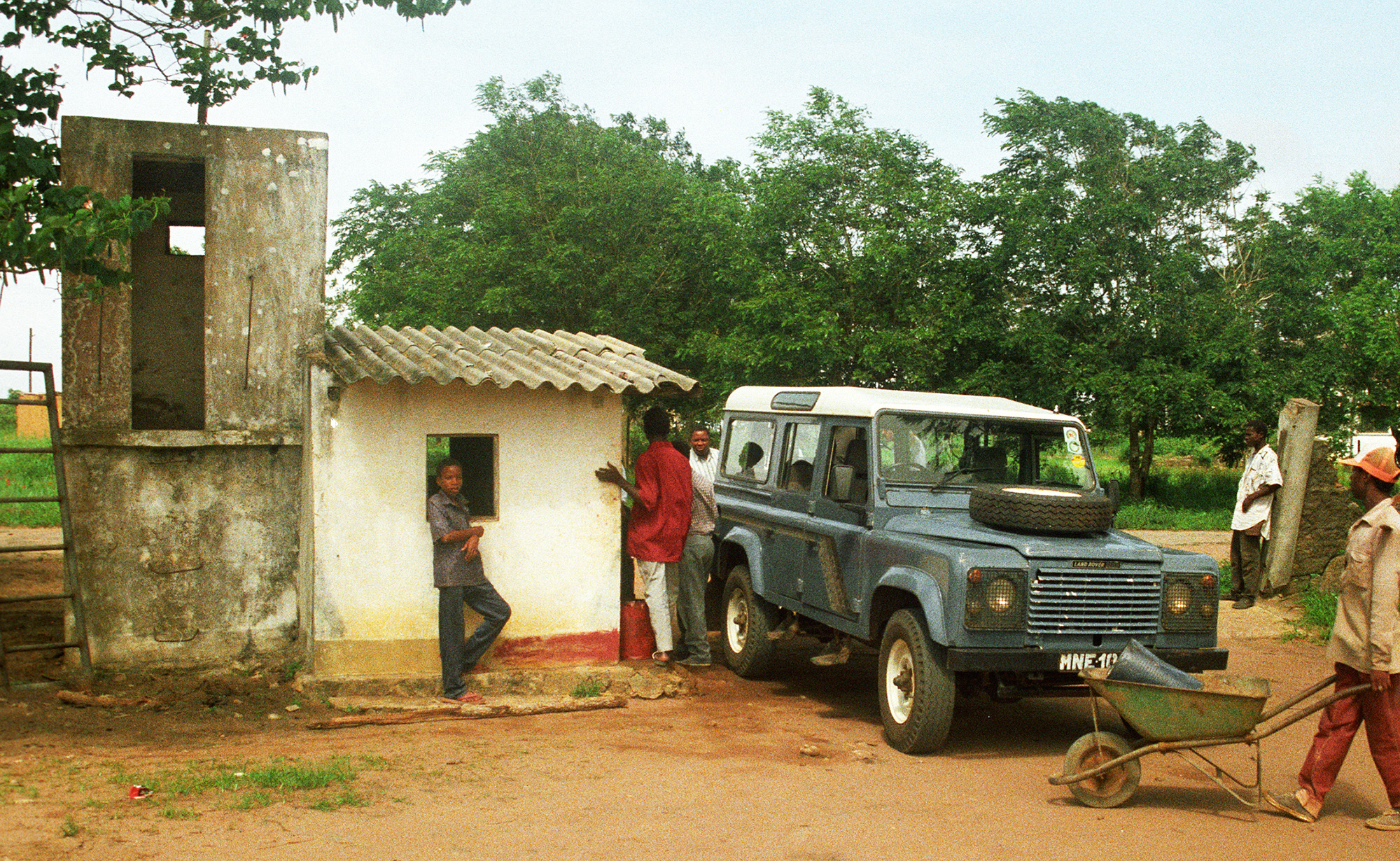
Refueling station in Mueda c. 1995
