= Ndonde people =

Ethnic group from Lindi Region of Tanzania

The Ndonde, also called the Ndonde Hamba, are an ethnic and linguistic group based in Nachingwea District, in the Lindi Region of southern Tanzania and a small portion of neighboring Malawi. In 2002, the Ndonde population was estimated to number between 10,000 and 20,000.

Edward Tingatinga, a Tanzanian painter, has said that he is inspired by the Ndonde mural art tradition.

The main Ndonde language is Ndonde Hamba, also known as Mawanda.
