= Escola Portuguesa de Moçambique =

Location
- Av. para o Palmar, nº562 Maputo; Mozambique
- Coordinates: 25.944040°S 32.612731°E

Information
- Other name: EPM-CELP
- Type: Public international school
- Established: 1999; 26 years ago
- Authority: Portuguese Ministry of Education
- Director: Provisory Commission
- Grades: PreK–12
- Enrollment: 1661 (as of 2022-23)
- Website: epmcelp.edu.mz

Escola Portuguesa de Moçambique - Centro de Ensino e Língua Portuguesa (EPM-CELP) is a Portuguese international school in Maputo, Mozambique. The school is operated by the Portuguese Ministry of Education and serves from Pre-school up to Grade 12.

It opened for the 1999–2000 school year, and was created from the Decree-Law No. 241/99 of 25 June promoting Cooperation between the Portuguese Republic and the Republic of Mozambique. This was modified by Decree-Law n.º 47/2009 of 23 February.

The school's symbol is of a tree within green and red portico. The tree roots represent the school's educational philosophy and are a reference to some verses from works of Luís de Camões.

In the future, the EPM will be the regulatory academy for the Mozambican dialects of the Portuguese language.
