= Mozambican Sign Language =

Deaf sign language of Mozambique

- Native to: Mozambique
- Native speakers: 150,000 (2021)
- Language family: unknown

Language codes
- ISO 639-3: mzy
- Glottolog: moza1235

Mozambican Sign Language (Portuguese: Língua de Sinais Moçambicana) is the principal language of the deaf community of Mozambique. It is reported to have "some dialectal variation", and to be spoken in at least the three largest cities of Maputo, Beira, and Nampula. As of 1999, there were efforts at standardization. MSL is not based on Portuguese Sign Language—or for that matter on American Sign Language—but other than that, its origin is not recorded.
