= Chuwabu language =

Bantu language spoken in Mozambique

Chuwabu
- Cuabo
- Native to: Mozambique
- Native speakers: 1.0 million (2017)
- Language family: Niger–Congo?: Atlantic–Congo; Volta-Congo; Benue–Congo; Bantoid; Southern Bantoid; Bantu; Southern Bantu; Makhuwa languages; Chuwabu
- Dialects: Central Chuwabo; Nyaringa; Marale; Karungu; Maindo
- Writing system: Latin

Language codes
- ISO 639-3: Either: chw – Chuwabo cwb – Maindo
- Glottolog: chuw1238 Chuwabu main1272 Maindo
- Guthrie code: P.34

Chuwabo (Echuwabo), also spelled Cuabo and Txuwabo, is a Bantu language spoken along the central coast of Mozambique.

Maindo, though customarily considered a separate language, is close enough to be a dialect of Chuwabo.
