= Makwe people =

Ethnic group from Mtwara Region of Tanzania

The Makwe are an ethnic and linguistic group based on the Indian Ocean coast in northern Mozambique and southern Tanzania. In 2003 the Makwe population was estimated to number 32,000, of which 22,000 live in Mozambique and 10,000 live in Tanzania . In Tanzania the Makwe language is also known as Maraba.
