= Makonde Plateau =

Geographic feature in southeast Tanzania

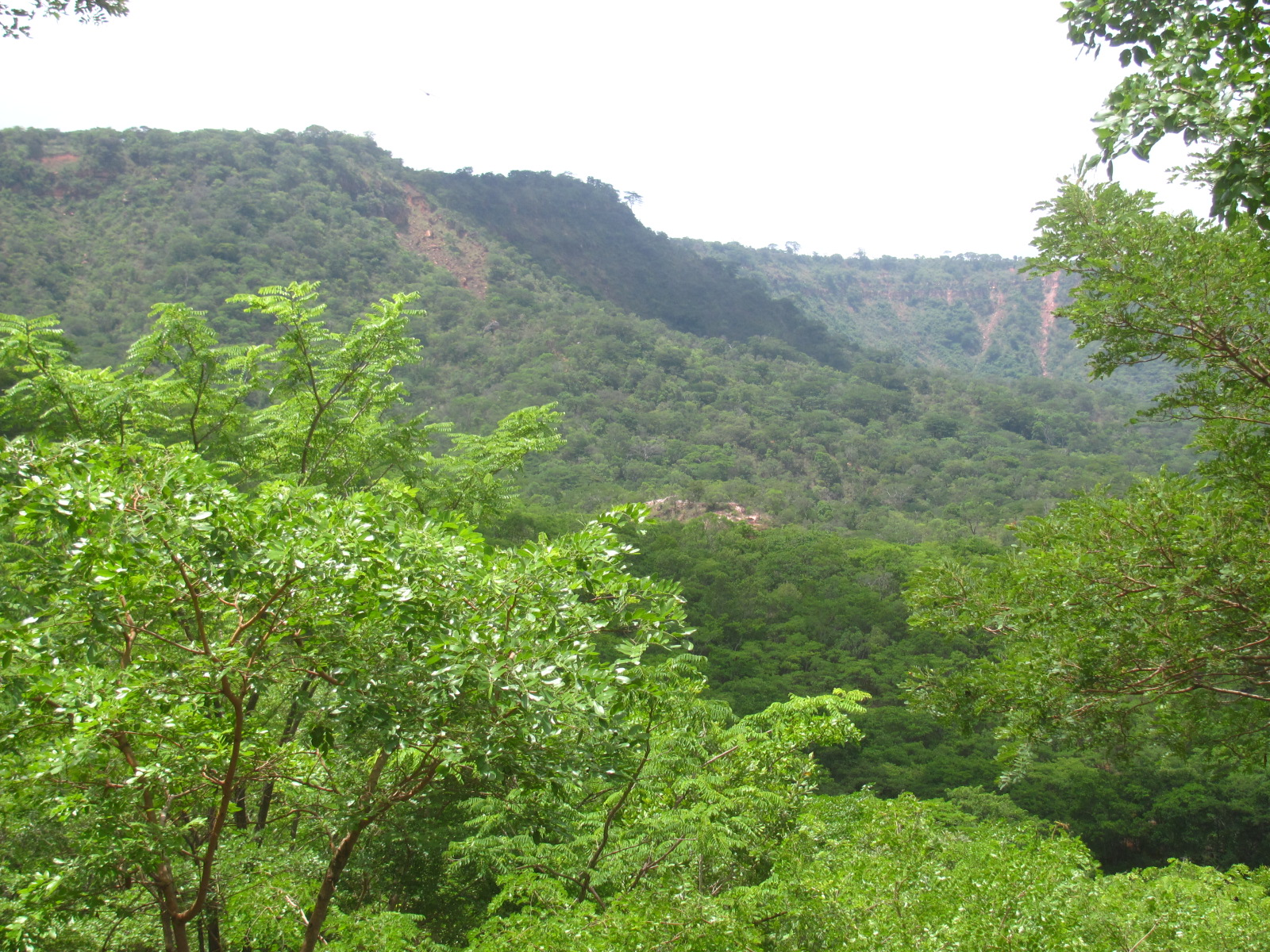

Highest point
- Elevation: 900 m (3,000 ft)
- Coordinates: 10°53′46″S 39°14′42″E

Geography
- Location within Tanzania
- Country: Tanzania
- Regions: Mtwara Region and Lindi Region

The Makonde Plateau, also known as the Newala Plateau, is a plateau in southeastern Tanzania. It is mostly within Mtwara Region, with the northeast corner in Lindi Region.

The Makonde Plateau is a roughly rectangular, rising from the coast west of Mtwara Region. There are steep escarpments along its western edge and along the Ruvuma River to the south. The Lukuledi River runs along its northern edge. The eastern portion is dissected by many stream valleys, while the western end is higher, reaching 900 meters elevation.

Newala is the plateau's main town. It is located on the southwest corner of the plateau, and has expansive vistas over the plains to the west, and south across the Ruvuma River into Mozambique.

The Makonde people inhabit the plateau and the adjacent lowlands. The Makonde people also inhabit the Mueda Plateau, which lies immediately south of the Ruvuma River in Mozambique. The Mueda Plateau is also referred to as the Makonde or Maconde plateau.

The Makonde Plateau is in the Southern Zanzibar-Inhambane coastal forest mosaic ecoregion.
