= Ngoni language (Mozambique) =

Ngoni
- Xingoni
- Native to: Mozambique
- Language family: Niger–Congo?: Atlantic–Congo; Volta-Congo; Benue–Congo; Bantoid; Southern Bantoid; Bantu; Northeast Bantu; Southern Tanzanian Highlands Bantu; Manda-Ngoni; Ngoni

Language codes
- ISO 639-3: xnq
- Glottolog: moza1251

Ngoni is a Bantu language of Mozambique. It is not an Nguni language, but only retains the name. It is only marginally mutually intelligible with Tanzanian Ngoni, with about 60% cognate vocabulary; speakers of the two languages resort to a third language, such as Swahili, to communicate. A lexicostatistical study found only 24% of core vocabulary.
