= Mwani language =

Bantu language spoken in Mozambique

Mwani
- Kimwani
- Native to: Mozambique
- Ethnicity: Mwani
- speakers: L1: 150,000 (2017); L2: 20,000 (no date)
- Language family: Niger–Congo?: Atlantic–Congo; Volta–Congo; Benue–Congo; Bantoid; Southern; Bantu; Northeast; Northeast Coast Bantu; Sabaki; Mwani
- Dialects: Kiwibo; Kisanga; Kinkojo; Kinsimbwa
- Writing system: Latin

Language codes
- ISO 639-3: wmw
- Glottolog: mwan1247
- Guthrie code: G.403

The Mwani language, also known by its native name Kimwani, (Kimwani [kiˈmwani]) is a Bantu language spoken on the coast of the Cabo Delgado Province of Mozambique, including the Quirimbas Islands. Although it shares high lexical similarity (60%) with Swahili, it is not intelligible with it. It is spoken by around 167,150 people (including 147,150 who speak it as a first language and 20,000 who use it as their second language). Speakers also use Portuguese (the official language of Mozambique), Swahili and Makhuwa language. Kiwibo, the dialect of the Island of Ibo is the prestige dialect. Kimwani (sometimes spelled as Quimuane) is also called Mwani (sometimes spelled as: Mwane, Muane) and Ibo. According to Anthony P. Grant Kimwani of northern Mozambique appears to be the result of imperfect shift towards Swahili several centuries ago by speakers of Makonde, and Arends et al. suggest it might turn out to be a Makonde–Swahili mixed language.

== Name ==
The name of the language comes from the word "Mwani", meaning "beach". The prefix "Ki" means the language of, so "Kimwani" literally means "language of the beach".

== Sounds ==
Kimwani (similar to Swahili) is unusual among sub-Saharan languages in having lost the feature of lexical tone (with the exception of some verbal paradigms where its use is optional). It does not have the penultimate stress typical of Swahili; it has movable pitch accent. Labialization of consonants (indicated by a [w] following the consonant) and palatalization of r (ry; [rj]) are frequent. Nasalization of vowels occurs only before a nasal consonant n followed by a consonant.

=== Vowels ===
Kimwani has five vowel phonemes: /a/, /e/, /i/, /o/, and /u/, that is: its vowels are close to those of Spanish and Hawaiian. It does not have a distinction of closed and open mid vowels typical of Portuguese or French and found in some other Bantu languages like Lingala, Fang, and perhaps Sukuma.

The pronunciation of the phoneme /i/ stands between International Phonetic Alphabet [i] and [e]. Vowels are never reduced, regardless of stress. The vowels are pronounced as follows:

- /a/ is pronounced like the "a" in Arabic hajj
- /e/ is pronounced like the "e" in beat
- /i/ is pronounced like the "y" in yam
- /o/ is pronounced like the "o" in or
- /u/ is pronounced like the "u" in Sue.

Kimwani has no diphthongs; in vowel combinations, each vowel is pronounced separately.

=== Consonants ===
Consonants of Kimwani
| | | Labial | Alveolar | Palatal | Velar | Glottal |
|---|---|---|---|---|---|---|
| Nasal | | m | n | ɲ | ŋ | |
| Plosive & affricate | voiceless | p | t | tʃ | k | |
| Plosive & affricate | voiced | b | d | dʒ | g | |
| Fricative | voiceless | f | s | ʃ | | h |
| Fricative | voiced | v | z | | | |
| Trill | | | r | | | |
| Approximant | | w | l | j | | |

== Orthography ==
Kimwani can be spelled in three ways: using orthography similar to Swahili, using a slightly modified spelling system used in Mozambique schools or using a Portuguese-based spelling. Here are the differences:

Kimwani spelling systems differences
| | Swahili language spelling | Modified spelling | Portuguese spelling | Translation |
|---|---|---|---|---|
| /tʃ/ | chala | cala | tchala | finger |
| /dʒ/ | juwa | juwa | djua | Sun |
| /k/ | kitabu | kitabu | quitabo | book |
| /ŋ/ | ng'ombe | ng'ombe | ngombe | cow |
| /ɲ/ | nyoka | nyoka | nhoca | snake |
| /s/ | fisi | fisi | fissi | hyena |
| /z/ | meza | meza | mesa | table |
| /ʃ/ | kushanga | kushanga | cuxanga | to admire |
| /w/ | wakati | wakati | uacate | time |
| /j/ | kipya | kipya | quípia | new |
| /i/ | sukili | sukili | suquile | sugar |
| /u/ | ufu | ufu | ufo | flour |

== Numbers ==
| Mwani | English |
|---|---|
| moja | one |
| mbili | two |
| natu | three |
| n’né | four |
| tano | five |
| sita | six |
| saba | seven |
| nane | eight |
| kenda | nine |
| kumi | ten |
| kumi na moja | eleven |
| kumi na mbili | twelve |
| ishirini | twenty |
| thelathini | thirty |
| arubaini | forty |
| hamsini | fifty |
| sitini | sixty |
| sabini | seventy |
| themanini | eighty |
| tisini | ninety |
| mia | one hundred |
| mia mbili | two hundred |
| elfu | one thousand |
| elfu mbili | two thousand |
