= Mozambican Portuguese =

Variety of Portuguese language

- português moçambicano, português de Moçambique
- Speakers: Native speakers: 5 million (2020); L2 speakers: 8 million (2020)
- Language family: Indo-European: Italic; Latin; Romance; Western Romance; Ibero-Romance; West-Iberian; Galician-Portuguese; Portuguese; Mozambican Portuguese
- Writing system: Latin (Portuguese alphabet); Portuguese Braille

Official status
- Official language in: Mozambique
- Regulated by: Academia de Ciências de Moçambique

Language codes
- ISO 639-3: –
- Glottolog: None
- IETF: pt-MZ

Mozambican Portuguese (Portuguese: português moçambicano) is a dialect of Portuguese spoken in Mozambique. Portuguese is the official language of the country.

Barwe and Mozambican Portuguese

Several variables factor into the emergence of Mozambican Portuguese. Mozambique shares the linguistic norm used in the other Portuguese-speaking African countries and Portugal. Mozambican Portuguese also enriches the Portuguese language with new words and expressions.

== Speakers ==
According to the 1997 census, 40% of the population of Mozambique spoke Portuguese. 9% spoke it at home, and 6.5% considered Portuguese to be their mother tongue. According to the general population survey taken in 2017, Portuguese is now spoken natively by 16.6% of the population aged 5 and older (or 3,686,890) and by one in every five people aged 15 to 19. First language speakers make up 38.3% of the urban population (and 43.9% of all urban teenagers aged 15 to 19) and 5.1% of the total population in rural areas. Also, according to the "Padrão Linguístico" report, based on the data obtained from the 2017 census, Portuguese is already the main primary or native language in both the city and the province of Maputo where it is spoken as a first language respectively by approximately 69% and 54,7% of the population. This data, as well as the percentage of native speakers in the other provinces, is well illustrated in the maps below.

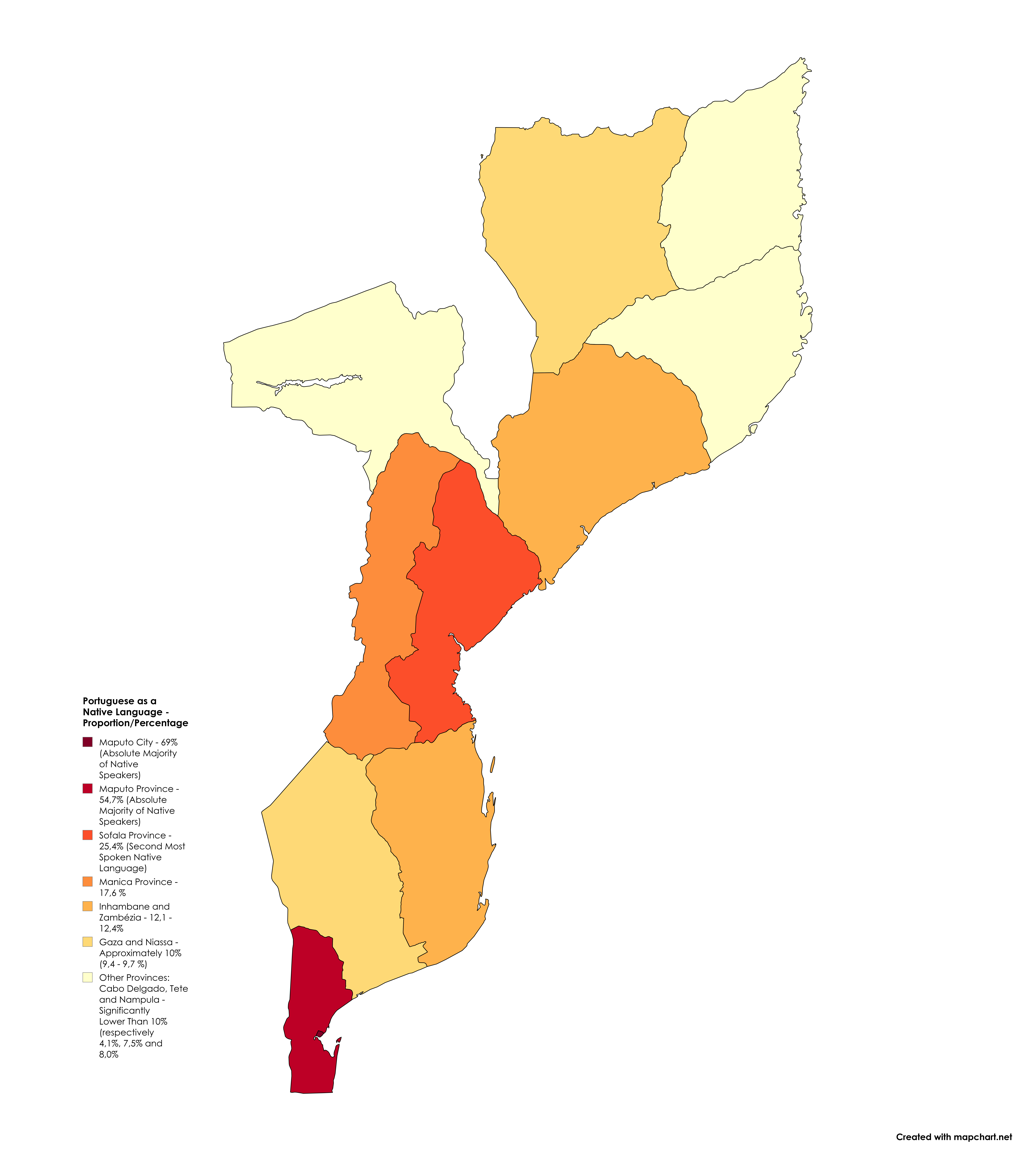
Portuguese as a Native Language in Mozambique - Proportion of Speakers

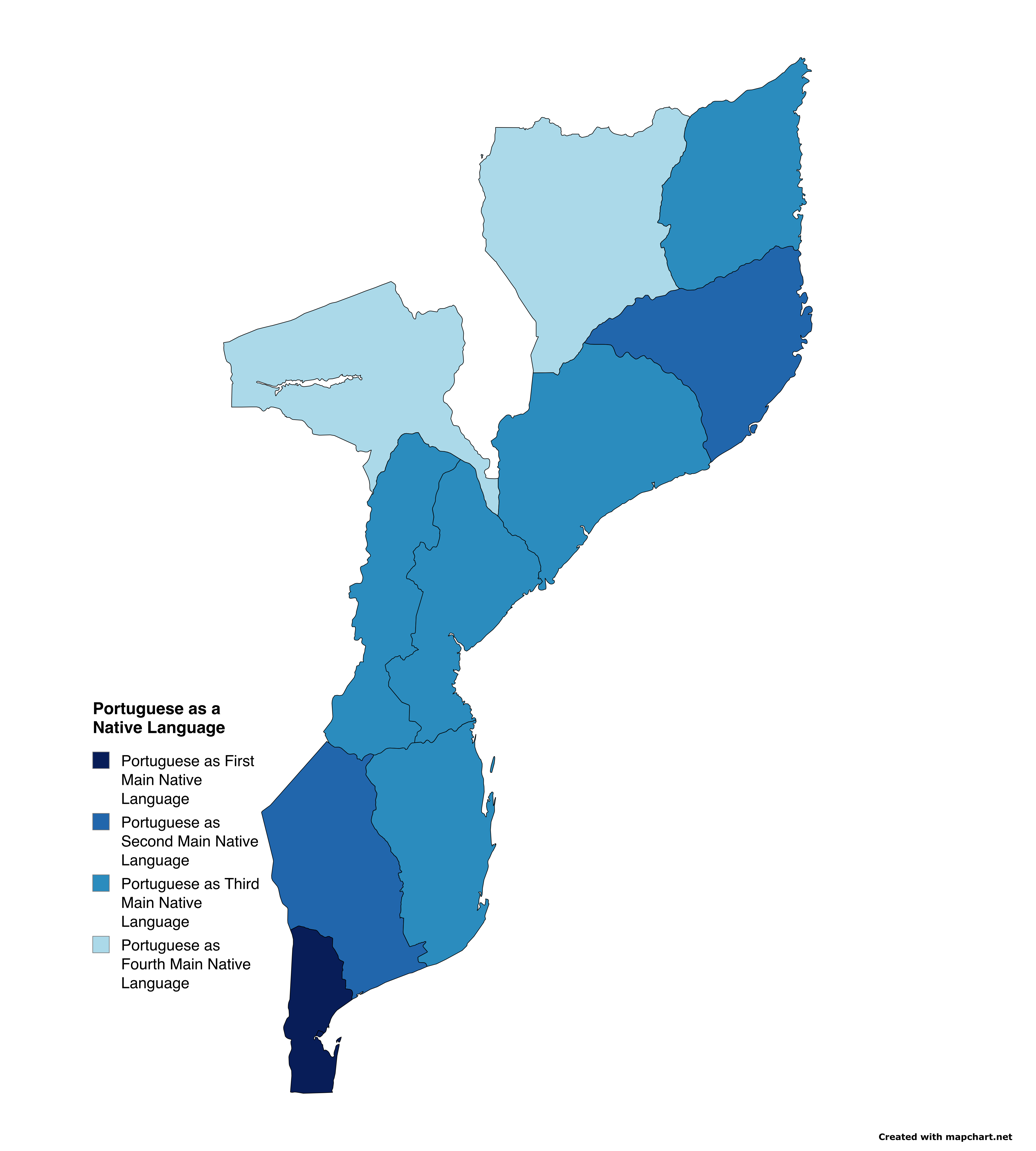
Portuguese as a Native Language in Mozambique - Geographical Distribution

== Historical and social context ==
Portuguese is a post-colonial language. Introduced during the colonial era, Portuguese was selected as the official language of the new state as it was ethnically neutral. It was also the common language of the elites who received their post-secondary education in Portugal. Portuguese played an important role in the rhetoric of the independence movement, being seen as a potential vehicle for the articulation of a national identity.

Mozambique has extraordinary ethnolinguistic diversity, with no one language dominating demographically. Portuguese serves as a lingua franca allowing communication of Mozambicans with fellow citizens of other ethnicities, including especially white Mozambicans. Of those Mozambicans who speak Portuguese, the majority are non-native speakers, thus spoken with accents of African languages. The lack of native speakers is due, in part, to the exodus of massive number of white Mozambicans to places such as Portugal, South Africa, and Brazil and to the fact that the country is far from the rest of the Lusosphere. This left very few native speakers of Portuguese in Mozambique. But in cities like Maputo, it is the native language of majority of residents.

The standard Mozambican Portuguese used in education, media and legal documents is based on European Portuguese vocabulary used in Lisbon, but Mozambican Portuguese dialects differ from standard European Portuguese both in terms of pronunciation and colloquial vocabulary.

== Phonology ==
Standard European Portuguese is the norm of reference in Mozambique. In terms of pronunciation, however, Mozambican Portuguese shows several departures, some of which are due to the influence of other languages of Mozambique:

- Vowel reduction is not as strong as in Portugal.
- The elision of word-final 'r' (for example, estar as [eʃˈta] instead of [eʃˈtaɾ])
- Occasional pronunciation of the initial and final 'e' as [i] (for example, felicidade as [felisiˈdadi] instead of [felisiˈdadɨ] or [fɨlisiˈðaðɨ]).
- /b, d, ɡ/ are pronounced as plosives [b, d, ɡ] in all positions.

The above tendencies are stronger in vernacular speech and less marked in cultivated speech, thus the pronunciation of first-language speakers sound more European Portuguese and the enumerated conditions listed above except latter.

The variation of sounds of Portuguese spoken in Mozambique is conditioned by the phonology of the Bantu languages. The variety Mozambican is generally characterized by the occurrence of only the multiple vibrant liquid consonant [R] in different lexical contexts. If it is also characterized by the aspiration of the digraph composed by the liquid velar [l] and by the aspirated [h], moving away from European Portuguese and also from Brazilian Portuguese, in the latter where, in different regions, occurrences of other achievements of the vibrant are recorded.

== Lexicon ==
There are many words and expressions borrowed from indigenous languages of Mozambique into Portuguese. Examples include:

- chima from the Emakhuwa, Cisena and Cinyungwe languages, is a type of porridge
- xituculumucumba from Xirona is a type of bogeyman
- machamba from Swahili refers to agricultural land
- dumba-nengue from Xirona is a term used for informal trade or commerce
- madala from Xichangana is a person of high status or esteem
- nhamussoro from Cindau is a person who can mediate between the living and the dead

Mozambican Portuguese also borrowed words of Arabic origin, because of national Islamic presence.

- metical (Mozambican currency, from mitqāl, an Arabic unit of weight, from taqāl, weigh).

One also finds neologisms in Mozambican Portuguese such as

- machimbombo the word for bus also shared with other lusophone African countries.
- cronicar, the word crónica turned into a verb
- desconseguir meaning 'to fail' a negation of the verb conseguir using the prefix 'des-' rather than não.
- depressar instead of ir depressa
- agorinha instead of agora mesmo
- tirar dinheiro meaning financiar, 'to finance'
- tirar lágrimas meaning chorar, 'to cry'
- assistir televisão instead of 'ver a televisão'
- comer dinheiro ('eat money') meaning 'to fritter money away'
- mata-bicho ('kill the beast') meaning 'breakfast'

There are also words which, as a result of semantic expansion, have acquired additional meanings:

- estrutura which in addition to 'structure' also means 'authority'
- situação which is used to mean 'conflict' or 'war'.
- calamidade can mean clothes donated to victims of natural disasters or conflict. It also refers to divorcées and widows who have begun a new relationship.
- nascer, 'to be born' has the additional meaning of 'to give birth to'

Many of these words came to Portugal, which was settled by returning Portuguese refugees after Mozambican independence. These words were also brought to South Africa and Brazil by Portuguese refugees after independence.

== See also ==
- African Portuguese
- Languages of Mozambique
- Escola Portuguesa de Moçambique
- São Tomean Portuguese
- Southern African Development Community
