= Makonde language =

Bantu language spoken in East Africa

Makonde
- Chi(ni)makonde
- Native to: Tanzania, Mozambique, Malawi, Kenya
- Ethnicity: Makonde, Ndonde Hamba
- Native speakers: (2.1 million cited 1987–2016)
- Language family: Niger–Congo?: Atlantic–Congo; Volta-Congo; Benue–Congo; Bantoid; Southern Bantoid; Bantu; Rufiji–Ruvuma; Ruvuma; Makonde languages; Makonde
- Dialects: ? Matembwe–Machinga; Mabiha; Ndonde Hamba (Mawanda)
- Writing system: Latin

Language codes
- ISO 639-3: Variously: kde – Makonde mvw – Machinga njd – Ndonde Hamba wtb – Matambwe
- Glottolog: mako1251 Makonde mach1265 Machinga mata1313 Matambwe
- Guthrie code: P.23,24,25

- Person: Mmakonde
- People: Wamakonde
- Language: Kimakonde
- Country: Umakonde

Makonde (Swahili: Kimakonde, Portuguese: Maconde) is the language spoken by the Makonde, an ethnic group in southeast Tanzania and northern Mozambique. Makonde is a central Bantu language closely related to Yao. The Matambwe (Matembwe) and Mabiha (Maviha) dialects are divergent, and may not be Makonde.

A mosquito-borne viral fever first identified on the Makonde Plateau is named Chikungunya, which is derived from the Makonde root verb kungunyala (meaning "that which bends up", "to become contorted," or "to walk bent over"). The derivation of the term is generally falsely attributed to Swahili.

== Phonology ==
The following are the consonants and vowels of the Makonde language:

=== Vowels ===
	Front	Back
High	i	u
Mid	e	o
Low	a	

There also tends to be a rising final vowel sound /vv́/ within vowel combinations.

=== Consonants ===
		Labial	Alveolar	Palatal	Velar	Glottal
Plosive	voiceless	p	t		k	
Plosive	voiced	b	d		ɡ	
Plosive	prenasal	ᵐb	ⁿd	ᶮɟ	ᵑɡ	
Affricate				tʃ		
Fricative			s			h
Nasal		m	n	ɲ	ŋ	
Lateral			l			
Approximant		ʋ		j	w	
