= Mueda Plateau =

Geographic feature in Northern Mozambique

- Location within Mozambique

Highest point
- Coordinates: 11°24′S 39°20′E

Geography
- Location: Mozambique

The Mueda Plateau, also known as the Maconde Plateau, is a plateau in Cabo Delgado Province of northeastern Mozambique.

== Geography ==
The Mueda Plateau lies between the Ruvuma River on the north, which forms the border with Tanzania, and the Messalo River on the south. It is named for the town of Mueda, the principal town on the plateau.

The highest portion of the plateau reaches above 1000 meters elevation. The western edge of the plateau forms a steep escarpment, dropping to rolling plains. The plateau has an area of 1715 square kilometers. The Macomia Plateau lies to the south, across the Messalo River. The Makonde Plateau lies to the north, across the Ruvuma River in Tanzania.

The plateau is composed of includes metamorphic and volcanic rocks. The soils of the plateau are classified as nitisols.

== Climate ==
Mueda, at an elevation of 847 meters, has an average annual rainfall of 1,093 mm, and a mean annual temperature of 21.9 °C. Most of the rainfall occurs during the October-to-April wet season.

== Ecology ==
The Mueda Plateau is in the Southern Zanzibar-Inhambane coastal forest mosaic ecoregion. The natural vegetation is a mosaic of plant communities, including miombo woodland, dry deciduous and semi-deciduous forest, dry deciduous thicket, and grassland. Miombo woodland is characterized by species of Brachystegia and Julbernardia which form open-canopied woodlands and savannas. Dry deciduous and semi-deciduous forests generally have a closed canopy, and trees are often dry-season deciduous and/or sclerophyllous. Typical dry forest species include Manilkara sansibarensis, Pteleopsis myrtifolia, Warneckea sansibarica, and Baphia macrocalyx. Dry forests subjected to human disturbance from timber harvesting, livestock grazing, and shifting cultivation are often more thicket-like.

It is estimated that 2,332 km^{2} of the plateau was densely vegetated with woodland or forest 150 to 100 years ago. A survey of forest cover from 2002 satellite data found that only 89 km^{2} of the plateau is still densely vegetated, a 96.2% reduction over more than a century.

== People ==
The Makonde people inhabit the plateau and the adjacent lowlands. The Makonde Plateau, which lies immediately north of the Ruvuma River in Tanzania, is also inhabited by the Makonde. The name 'Makonde' is derived from the typical woodland thickets of the plateau.

The soil is light and sandy but fertile, and the Makonde people on the plateau traditionally practiced a form of swidden agriculture with a three-crop rotation. Trees were cut down to stumps, which provide support for vine crops (beans, pumpkins, and cucumbers) followed by a maize crop, and then millet. At the end of the growing season, the tree stumps were allowed to re-grow for a six- to nine-year fallow period.
