= Makonde people =

Ethnic group of Tanzania, Mozambique, South Africa and Zimbabwe

Wamakonde
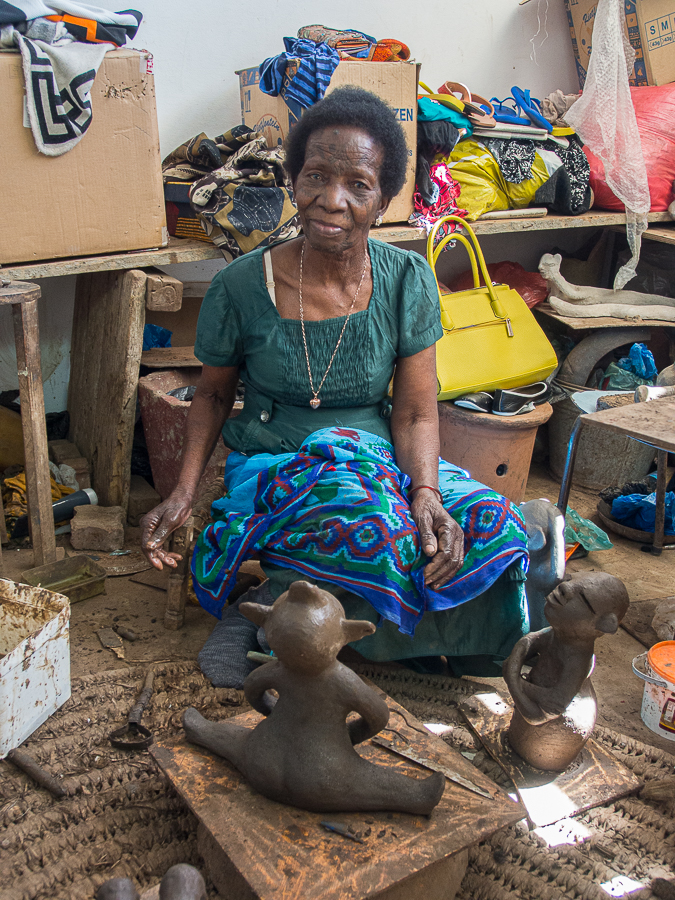
- A makonde artist, Reinata Sadimba, showcasing Makonde artwork at a museum in Maputo, Mozambique

Regions with significant populations
- Tanzania: 1,200,000
- Mozambique: 240,000
- Kenya: 3,764
- Mayotte: 1,400

Languages
- Kimakonde, Kiswahili, English, Portuguese, French

Religion
- In Tanzania: Majority Islam Minority Ancestor Worship In Mozambique: Majority Christianity Minority Islam and Ancestor Worship

Related ethnic groups
- Yao, Mwani, Makwe and Other Bantu peoples, Swahilis|Mwanis|Makuas|Yaos|Andondes|[[Vandondes]|Makwes }}

- Person: Mmakonde
- People: Wamakonde
- Language: Kimakonde
- Country: Umakonde

The Makonde are an ethnic group in southeast Tanzania, northern Mozambique, and Kenya. The Makonde developed their culture on the Mueda Plateau in Mozambique. At present, they live throughout Tanzania and Mozambique and have a small presence in Kenya. The Makonde population in Tanzania was estimated in 2001 to be 1,140,000, and the 1997 census in Mozambique put the Makonde population in that country at 233,358, for an estimated total of 1,373,358. The ethnic group is roughly divided by the Ruvuma River; members of the group in Tanzania are referred to as the Makonde, and those in Mozambique as the Maconde. The two groups have developed separate languages over time but share a common origin and culture.

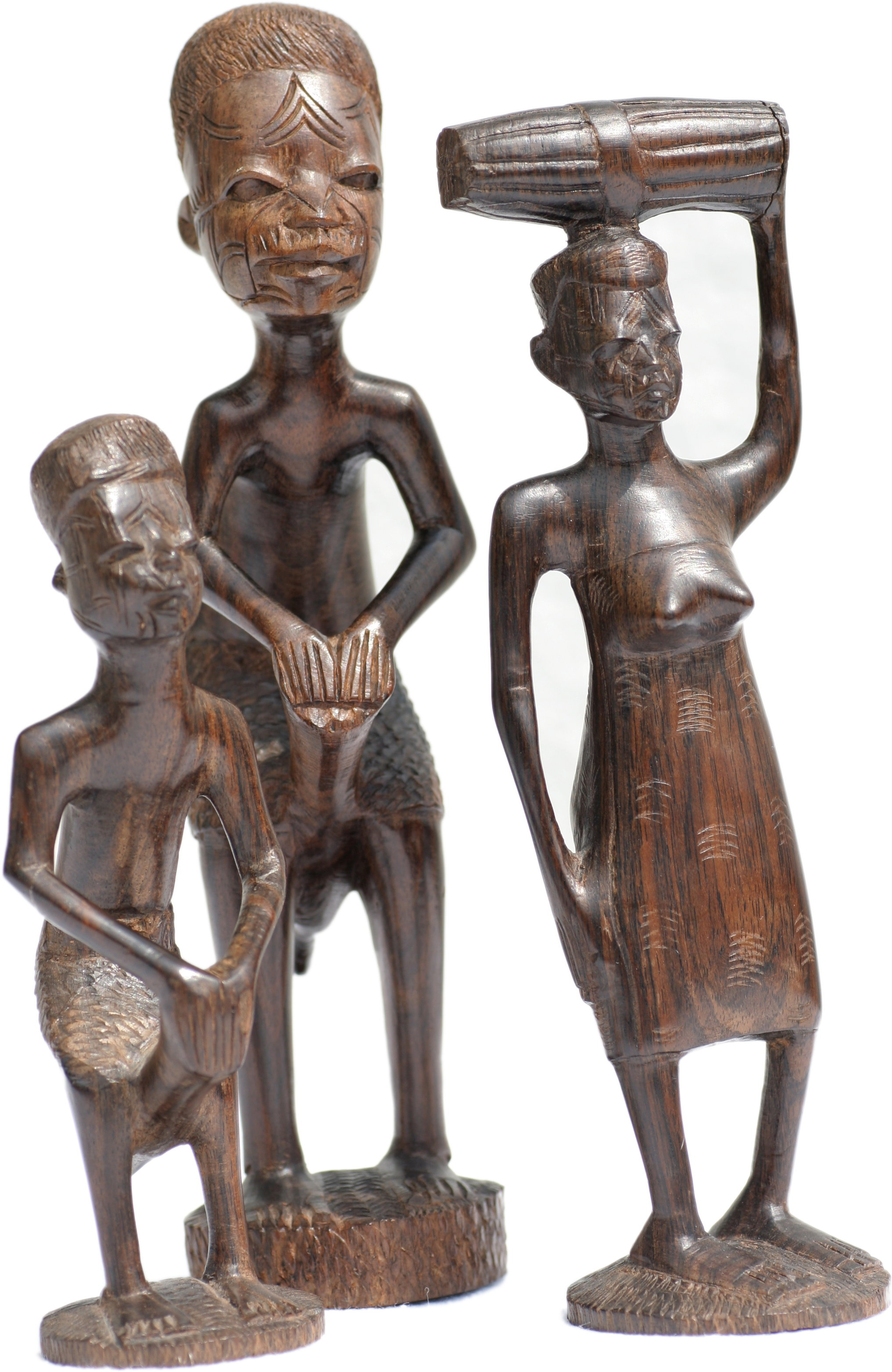
Modern Makonde wood carvings

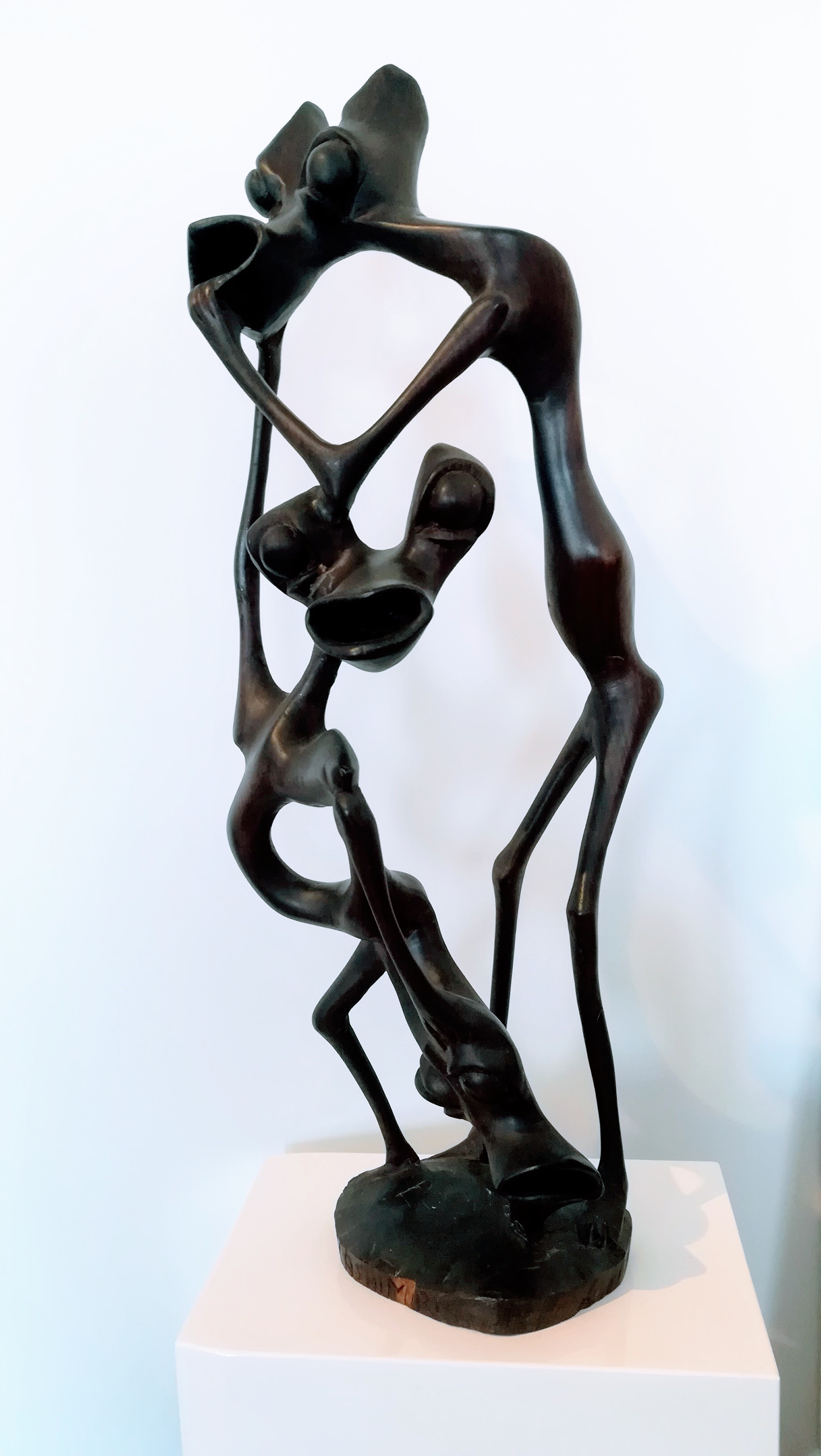
Makonde sculpture, Shetani-style

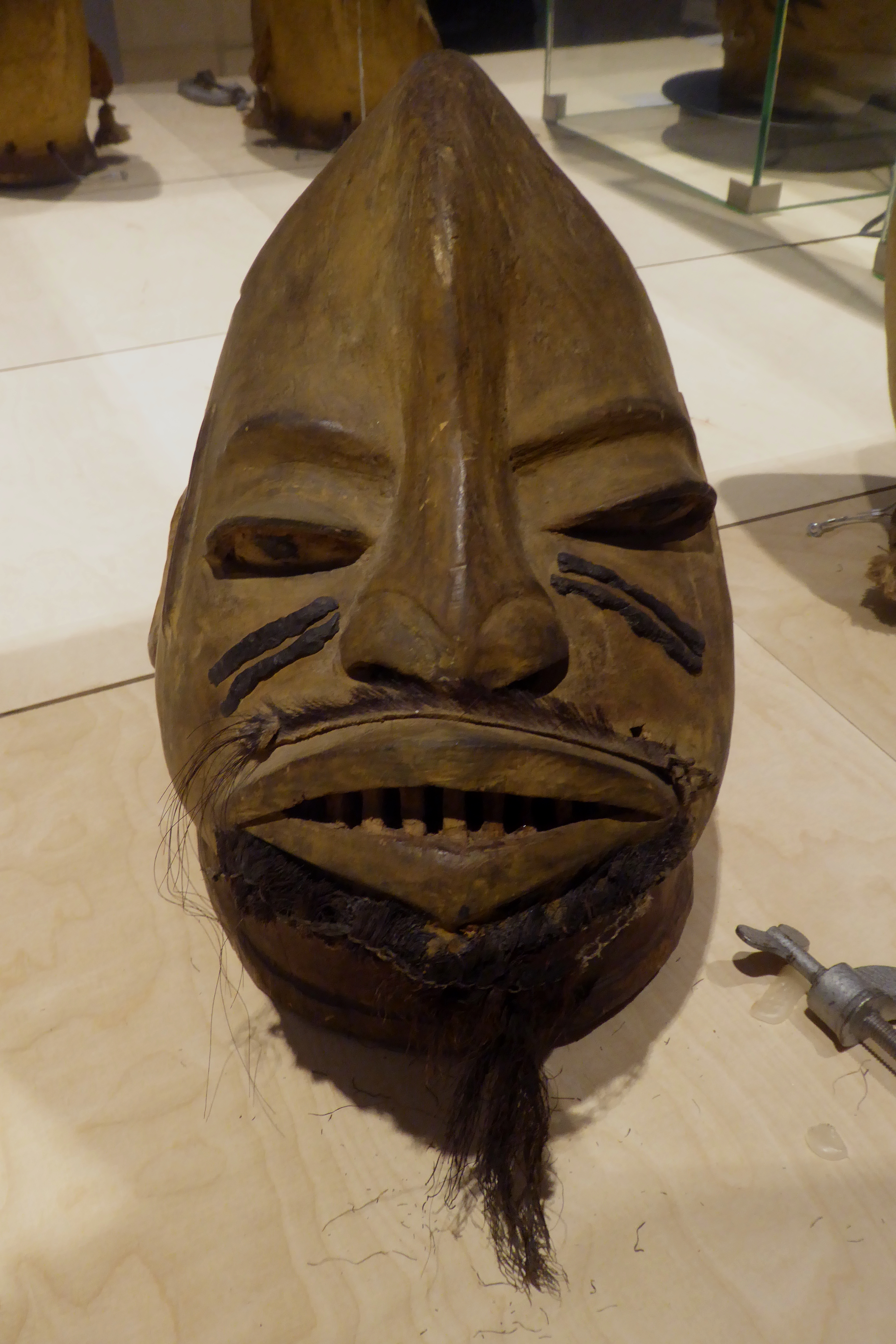
A typical mapiko mask worn by dancers during a Makonde initiation ceremony.

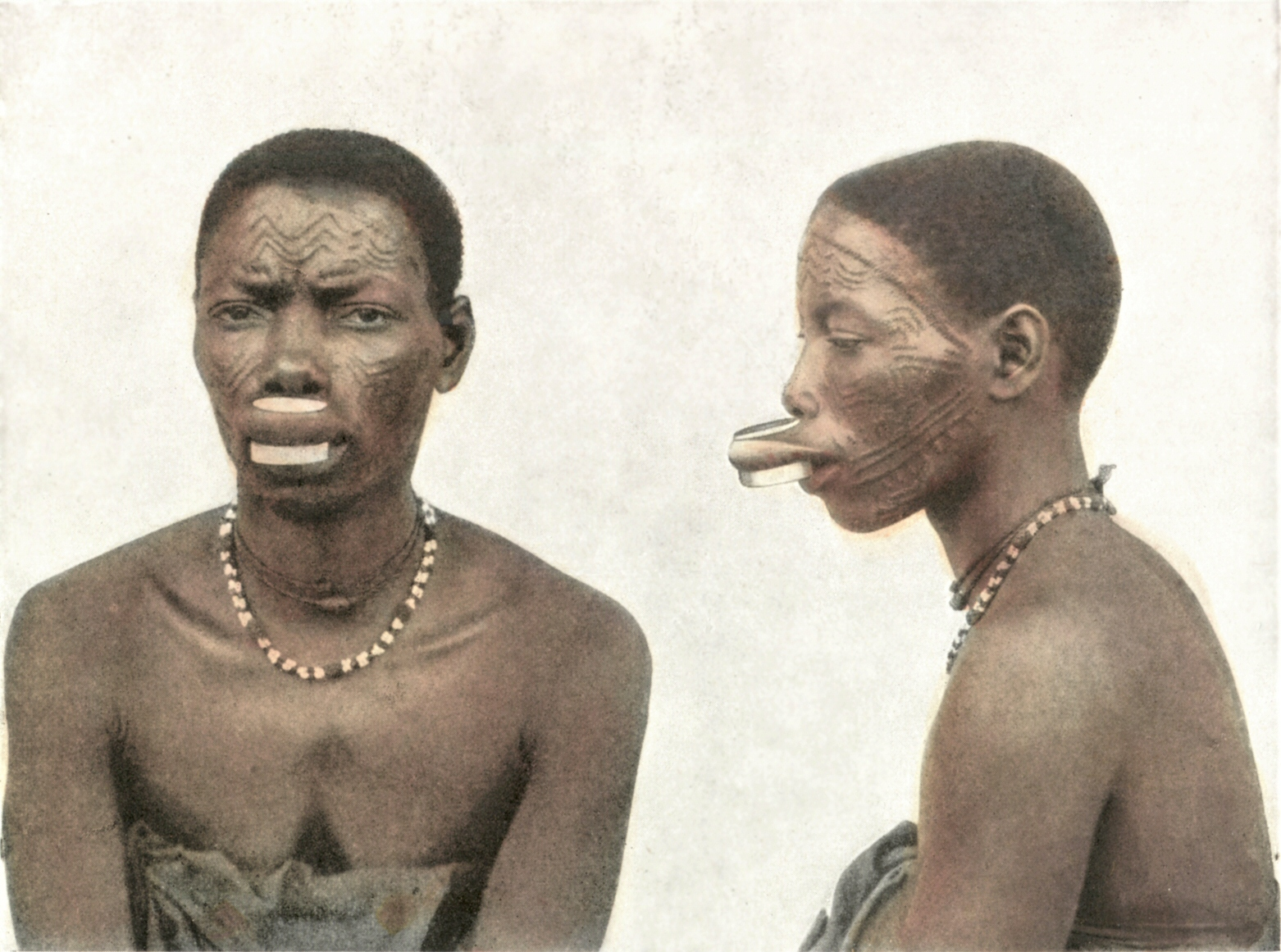
Traditional Makonde tattoos, now rarely observed. Photo circa 1900.

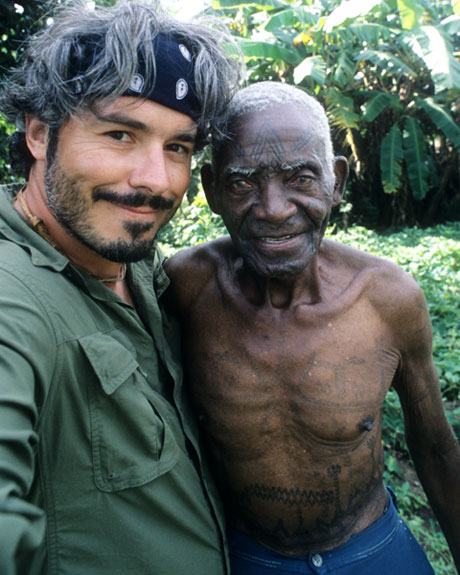
Makonde man in traditional tattoos (Dinembo)

== History ==
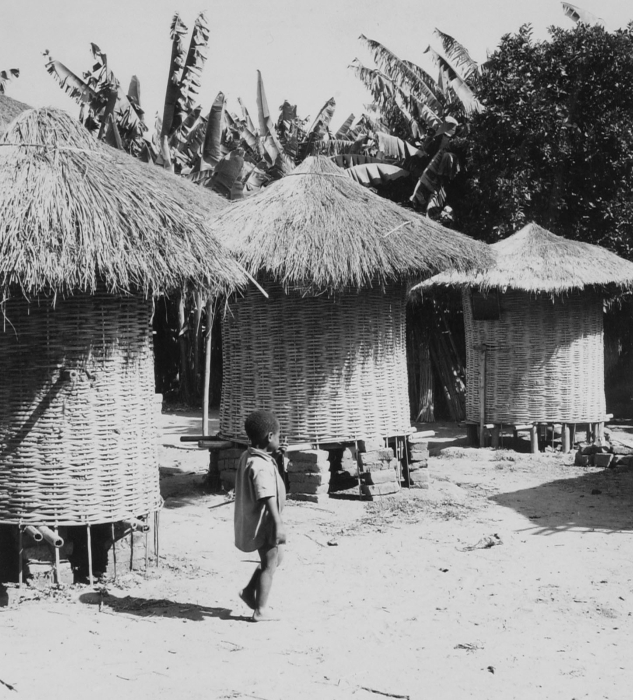
Makonde granary

The Makonde successfully resisted predation by African, Arab, and European slavers. They did not fall under colonial power until the 1920s. During the 1960s, the revolution which drove the Portuguese out of Mozambique was launched from the Makonde homeland of the Mueda Plateau. For a time, the revolutionary movement FRELIMO derived some of its financial support from the sale of Makonde carvings and the group became the backbone of the revolutionary movement. The Maconde of Mozambique, due to their role in the resistance to Portuguese colonial rule, remain an influential group in the politics of the country.

They speak Makonde, also known as ChiMakonde, a Bantu language closely related to Yao. Many speak other languages such as English in Tanzania, Portuguese in Mozambique, and Swahili and Makua in both countries. The Makonde are traditionally a matrilineal society where children and inheritances belong to women and husbands move into the village of their wives. Their traditional religion is an animistic form of ancestor worship and still continues, although Makonde of Tanzania are nominally Muslim and those of Mozambique are Catholic or Muslim. In Makonde rituals, when a girl becomes a woman, Muidini is the best dancer out of the group of girls undergoing the rituals.

The Makonde are best known for their wood carvings, primarily made of blackwood (Dalbergia melanoxylon, or mpingo), and their observances of puberty rites.

=== Kenyan citizenship ===
Some Makonde people from Mozambique had relocated to Kenya in the 1950s. Early in the 21st century, efforts began to obtain Kenyan identity cards to allow the Makonde to exercise their rights and privileges as Kenyan citizens. In 2016, a group of 300 Makonde people trekked from Kwale to Nairobi. The group was led by Diana Gichengo, an inclusion activist, and accompanied by other human rights supportive stakeholders. They headed to the State House in Nairobi to persuade the president to push their recognition as Kenyan citizens. President Kenyatta gave them a warm welcome. After a meal on 13 October 2016, the president ordered the relevant ministry to provide the Makonde with identity cards by December 2016.

== Makonde art ==
The Makonde people regard wood as a crucial part of their cultural and spiritual lives, as it is a basic material in daily life, but also in creative practice. Traditionally, wood has been used for the building of houses, to carve ritual figures and masks for initiation rites, and to create sculptures of fertility and lineage. In these functions, wood became conceptualized in terms of Makonde ideas of liveliness, creation, and ties or connecting linkages between worlds or spaces, here, the physical and spiritual. Traditionally, wood is a material that the Makonde would carve ritual devices, figures, and masks, household objects, when that art was commandeered after the 1930s to become an important part of the contemporary art of Africa. The most internationally recognized was George Lilanga.

=== Cultural significance of wood ===
Modern Makonde artists often choose ebony, a dense, historically revered wood associated with durability and refinement, but they are often more interested in the act of making than the permanence of the object made. The wood has many natural textures and irregularities that can spark the imagination and inform the artist’s inventive process and final form.

Makonde philosophers regard wood as anything but an inert substance. For them, wood is a living medium, imbued with spiritual life and renewal. When the artist carves wood, she engages in a conversation between human creativity and the natural life force within the wood. The sacredness of art resides in the process of creating rather than the permanence of the work of art. In this way, the Makonde understanding of wood – or, more specifically, ebony – articulates a cosmological perspective that connects artistic practice, nature, and spirituality in a single web.

=== Materials and early practices ===
In the past, the Makonde carvers used whatever wood was available on the Mueda Plateau, accounting for commonly used soft wood types (e.g. njala), that would permit them to carve for ritual use more readily. The wood was used to make mapiko masks for male initiation, create figurines that were used to impart moral teachings, and produce items of domestic benefit, such as stools and containers. Some of these items were designed for temporary or ceremonial use, intended to be hidden, burned, or destroyed after fulfilled duties. The impermanence was valued more than preserving items as keepsakes, and secrecy was an important part of the educational and spiritual significance of the carvings, however function is its value was applied over meaning.

=== Techniques and craftsmanship ===
Typically, Makonde carving is performed monoxylously, or from a single block of wood. The artist first visualizes or sketches out the form, and then they round it out using an adze or wood chisel. The artist will then work in finer details with knives and rasps, and then sand the item smooth, followed by applying oils or waxes to maintain the fine surface and sheen. The carver is sensitive to the grain, colors, and normal irregularities of the wood, and in many cases, knots, defects, and twists are incorporated into the final design to respect the natural structure of the wood and facilitate the expression of the artist.

Some sculptures exist independently of any individual artist, and an artist may use assistants to do the hard work of preparing or polishing a sculpture, while they themselves maintain the final authorial eye. The mode of production represents a balance between collective labor and individual genius, building on centuries of technical mastery from generation to generation, and evolving alongside new materials and markets.

=== Genres and iconography ===
Throughout time, Makonde sculpture has diversified into several easily identifiable types, many of which still play an important role in categorizing Makonde art today.

- Binadamu – Realistic human forms that depict everyday life scenes, work, and family. The sculptures themselves aspire for realism and mimic dignity, identity, and cultural practice.
- Ujamaa – Communal design or the "Tree of Life" style where adjacent human forms climb over each other in a posture of support. The forms refer to family, unity and the reciprocal flow of relationship with one another. The ujamaa style itself relates to postcolonial notions of collective power and national identity.
- Shetani – Spirit-figures that are completely abstract or semi-abstract representations of supernatural beings, ancestors, or the distinctions between the visible and invisible world. The figures are imaginative and even grotesque, highlighting the artist's individuality and expressive capacity.

These styles indicate a merging of continuity with pre-colonial ritual symbolism and adaptation to a new audience. The shetani style in particular has become synonymous with Makonde modernism, including spiritual implications and surrealistic abstraction that resonates in a broader African and global arts context.

== Initiation rituals ==
Initiation rituals are a significant cultural practice among the Makonde people, reflecting the change from childhood to adulthood. These events contain symbolism and learning while providing a key function as educational systems and rites of passage, reaffirming cultural values, secrecy, and respect for community knowledge. Children learn about appropriate behavior and community relationships through routines, stories, music, and art. The initiation rituals bring the children together to finalize the teaching, and to share knowledge with them in the form of creative and expressive means of dance, sculpture and song.

For boys, this initiation period contains a period of seclusion, instruction, and circumcision, which represents a new birth and the acquisition of new responsibilities as adults. Fire plays an important role in the ceremony, symbolizing new life and the continuity of the cultural group. The local community leaders plan the logistics of the event, including the fathers of the shiputu rite, who bear at least the burden of organizing the events and medicine-men, who bear the spiritual authority of the rite and sacred objects associated with the ceremony. Instruction is focused on discipline, endurance, and respect—especially respect to maternal figures, but many lessons involve the use of clay and wooden figures to represent proverbs and morals.

When the months-long process ends, the boys are welcomed back into their families as men, with new names, clothing, and celebrations that reaffirm their place in the community.

Girls hold their own initiation rite, the ciputu, that marks puberty, encourages preparation for womanhood, and expectation. It is held openly and not in secret as the boys' rite but has its own taboo. The girls spend several days in seclusion inside a closed house, during which time they are instructed about the duties of a wife and basic sexual biology. Female members of the family (usually older relatives) assist, instruct, and guide the girls in the rites as preparation for womanhood. This rite illustrates a stage of maturity for young girls, social roles and continuity of life. At the end of this period, the girls take a ceremonial bath, accompanied by the singing and drumming of the community, gathered outside the house. The girls are then anointed with oil and dressed in new garments created just for the occasion. As they file out of the house, the community welcomes them and a ceremonial mdimu dance is performed by mapiko dancers wearing elaborate wooden masks. Traditionally, after the initiation rites are complete, tattoos were applied to the face and body to mark these young men and women as Makonde adults, but fewer Makonde now undergo tattooing due to changing standards of beauty.

At the core of these rituals is a spirituality-based worldview. The Makonde see life-as-a-force as a continuum that joins the living with the dead in a connection that can lead to illness and misfortune if balance is disturbed. Through magic, ritual, and education, acts are done to protect the individual and produce harmony in the set of relations that constitute this connected and spiritual life force order.

== Makonde witchcraft and sorcery ==
The Makonde maintain an active system of witchcraft and sorcery, sustained by people willing to pay for these services. Magic plays an influential role in local culture, politics and economics. Makonde sorcerers are often community leaders and are feared and respected as healers and protectors. They are frequently accused of murder and cannibalism, and are known to sometimes draw people away from seeking medical attention or contacting the police, when trust in healing and magic outweighs confidence in Western medicine or law enforcement. Recently, Makonde sorcerers have been accused of trafficking in human organs or bones for use in the preparation of magical substances. As in many other countries, accusations of witchcraft in present-day Mozambique have led to vigilante justice in which suspected witches or sorcerers have been killed by angry mobs.

== Notable Makonde people ==
- Benjamin Mkapa, third President of Tanzania
- George Lilanga, Tanzanian artist
- Filipe Nyusi, fourth President of Mozambique
- Reinata Sadimba, Mozambican artist
