= Muatide massacre =

2020 massacre in Mozambique

- Part of Insurgency in Cabo Delgado
- Location: Muatide football field, Cabo Delgado Province, Mozambique
- Date: November 6-8, 2020
- Attack type: Beheading
- Deaths: 50+
- Perpetrator: Islamic State - Central Africa Province

Between November 6 and 8, 2020, jihadist militants from Ahlu Sunnah Wal Jamaah (ASWJ) (Note: Also known as the Islamic State in Mozambique (ISM).) executed over fifty civilians in the village of Muatide. The massacre took place four days into the group's occupation of the town, and many of the victims were undergoing male initiation rites. The bodies of residents from other occupied villages were brought to the football field in the town, and ASWJ fighters hunted down remaining civilians that had fled into the bush.

== Background ==
The jihadist group Al-Shabaab, also known as Islamic State - Mozambique (ISM), Ansar al-Sunna, and Ahlu Sunnah wal Jamaah, has waged an insurgency in northern Mozambique's Cabo Delgado Province since 2017. The group has been known to launch raids into villages sympathetic to or controlled by the Mozambican Army (FADM), and brutally execute civilians and soldiers by decapitation. In April 2020, Ansar al-Sunna executed over fifty-two people in the village of Xitaxi after the residents refused to fight for the group. Similar massacres took place in Quissanga and Mocímboa da Praia later that summer.

== Massacre ==
On October 31, ASWJ began an offensive in Muidumbe District, attacking the towns of Magaia, Nchinga, 24 de Marco, Miteda, Muambula, Namacande, and Muatide. Mozambican soldiers fought back in Namacande and nearby towns the following day, but were defeated by the insurgents. This offensive ramped up on November 2, with ASWJ attacking civilians on the road between Palma and Mueda. Muatide was used as ASWJ's base of operations during the offensive. Residents stated that ASWJ did not attack civilians on the first day, but began kidnapping and beheading people two days into the occupation. The first resident to be killed in Muatide was a teacher, and in Muambula, local rulers were beheaded first.

Between November 6 and November 8, boys from the ASWJ-occupied towns that were undergoing male initiation rites were brought to the football field in Muatide. Fifteen of the boys and five adults were killed and their bodies brought from 24 de Marco, and twenty-four children and six adults from the other villages were killed and had their bodies brought to the field. Many other civilians had been killed at Muatide as well. Some government workers and teachers, who had heeded a request by a Muidumbe official to return to their villages by November 1, were killed and piled into the field as well. A resident of Muatide who fled the massacre stated he saw the decapitated bodies of dozens of people on the field. While he did not see the massacres in person, the survivor stated that ASWJ insurgents began searching the bush for the civilians that fled, and decapitated them. Other residents testified that the villagers who were killed in the bush were brought back the field with the rest of the massacred civilians.

Survivors talking to Voice of America in Mueda a week after the massacre confirmed initial reports that over fifty people had been killed at the football field in Muatide. Many survivors were scared to return to the village, as ASWJ would kidnap and behead those returning to look for food.

== Aftermath ==
The massacre was considered by an analyst speaking to the BBC "one of the worst of the war." The day after the massacre on November 4, ASWJ insurgents raided the town of Nampanha, and a day after attacked the village of Nanjaba. In Nanjaba, ASWJ killed two civilians and kidnapped six women, with residents fleeing into the bush as ASWJ torched the entire village to the ground.

At least fifty people were killed in total at Muatide. The exact death toll is unknown due to a lack of free press in Cabo Delgado, and reports from Pinnacle News being the only primary sources of the incident until December. Like the massacre at Xitaxi in April that killed a similar number of people, analysts at Cabo Ligado assessed that ASWJ likely targeted Makonde residents and Christians in Muidumbe District harsher compared to other districts due to Muidumbe having a larger population of both. However, the deadlier attacks in Muidumbe could have also been a result of more popular government support in the district.

== Reactions ==
Mozambican authorities denied the existence of any massacres in Muidumbe District. The Catholic Bishop of Pemba acknowledged attacks, but claimed that the beheading of fifty civilians in Muatide was an exaggeration. Cabo Delgado governor Valige Tauabo denied any attacks or massacres occurred in Muidumbe.

United Nations secretary general António Guterres condemned the massacre in a statement, along with French president Emmanuel Macron.

== See also ==
- Xitaxi massacre
- Battle of Mocímboa da Praia
- Mocímboa da Praia offensive
