= Battle of Mbau =

- Part of the 2021 Cabo Delgado offensives of the insurgency in Cabo Delgado
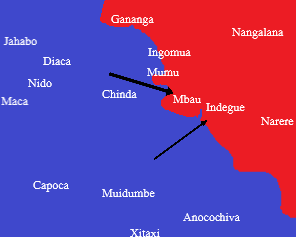
- Map of operations on Mbau
Date	12 August 2021 – 22 August 2021
Location	Mbau, Mocímboa da Praia, Cabo Delgado
Result	Mozambican-Rwandan Victory

Belligerents
Mozambique; Rwanda	Islamic State; Al-Shabab

Commanders and leaders
Xavier Antonio	Abdulaim (POW); Muhamudu †

Strength
30 military vehicles, 4 helicopters	80–100

Casualties and losses
	11

The Battle of Mbau was a battle by the joint Mozambican-Rwandan armed forces against ISIS and Al-Shabab in their headquarters of Mbau, a town 50 kilometers southwest of Mocimboa da Praia. The attack on the location was part of the 2021 Cabo Delgado offensives. Mbau was known as the headquarters of Al-Shabaab and the Mozambican counteroffensive on the town resulted in the loss of Mbau, Siri 1, and Siri 2.

== Background ==
Al-Shabaab with assistance from ISIS had taken control of Mbau during its offensive in Cabo Delgado in August 2020 and has committed numerous atrocities against civilians in the area. Fighting had taken around the town, but Mozambican and Rwandan forces had been repelled from the region.

== Fighting ==
=== Offensive on the Town ===
Mozambique as well as Rwandan forces announced a counteroffensive during the insurgency to retake Mbau on 12 August 2021. It was reported that there were more than 30 military vehicles and 4 helicopters arriving in Macomia for the offensive.

=== Fighting ===
Fires were reported in the Mbau forest after ISIS had left it during its retreat to Mbau on 17 August. On 19 August, Rwandan and Mozambican troops entered the town along with other towns near the area. On 21 August, Rwandan forces as well as Mozambican forces took control of most of the town, with ISIS troops on the outskirts. It was reported that ISIS fighters had cut down trees to slow down the allied forces. On 22 August, Mozambican and Rwandan forces confirmed the liberation of the town.

== War Crimes ==
Human Rights Watch reported that Al-Shabaab used child soldiers after one of them escaped the Mbau Al-Shabaab Training Centre where he was held captive and later turned into a child soldier. Numerous civilians have also been killed in Mbau during the fighting.

== Aftermath ==
Shortly after the recapture of the town, Ugandan president Yoweri Museveni said he would like to join the Mozambican and Rwandan forces in their counteroffensive. Mozambican forces also seized a boat escaping Mbau after the takeover. It was also reported that leader of a Renamo splinter group was captured after he massacred 51 men in Limala, near Mbau.
