= Messalo River =

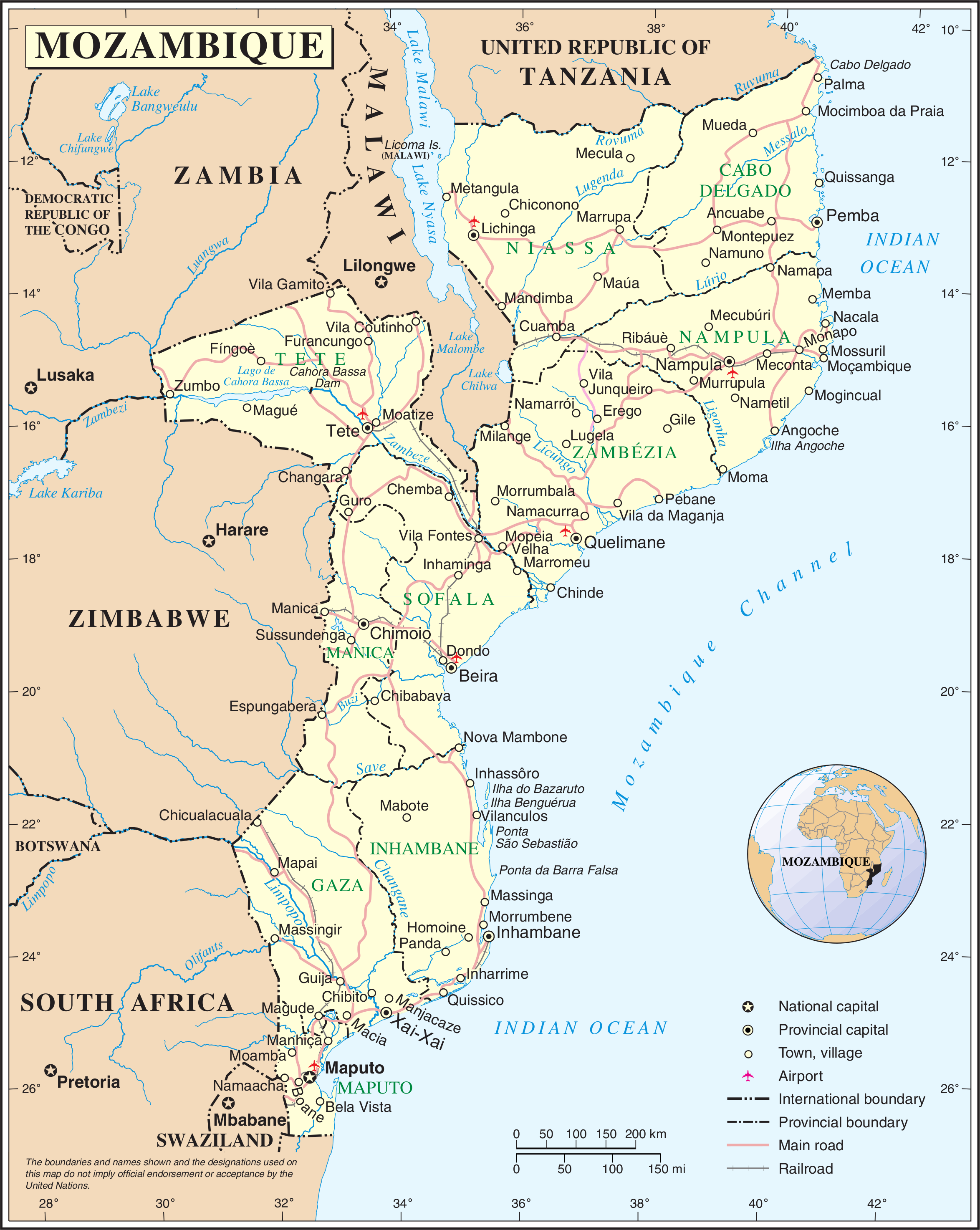

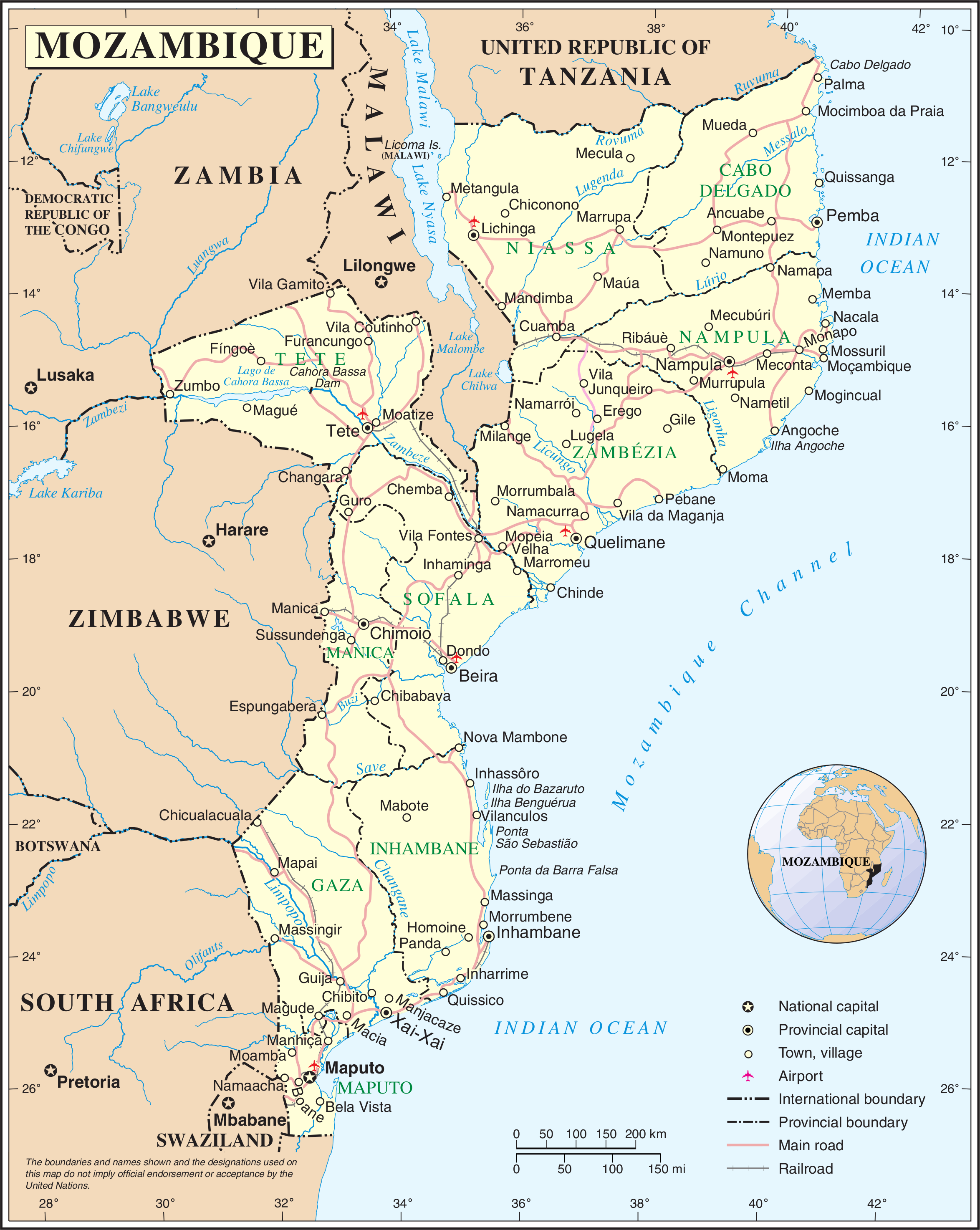
- Map of Mozambique. The Messalo is located in the northeast flowing through Cabo Delgado Province.

Location
- Country: Mozambique

Physical characteristics
- Mouth
  - location: Mozambique Channel
- Length: 530 km (330 mi)
- Basin size: 24,000 km^{2} (9,300 sq mi)

The Messalo (Portuguese: Rio Messalo) is a major river of northeastern Mozambique. It flows through Niassa Province and Cabo Delgado Province, passes near Chai, and flows into the Mozambique Channel of the Indian Ocean at Quiterajo beach at 11°40′25″S 40°26′25″E. The Messalo River is 530 km (330 mi) in length while the Messalo River Basin is 24,000 km^{2} (9,300 sq mi) in size. The river flooded its banks in March 2000 during the 2000 Mozambique flood.

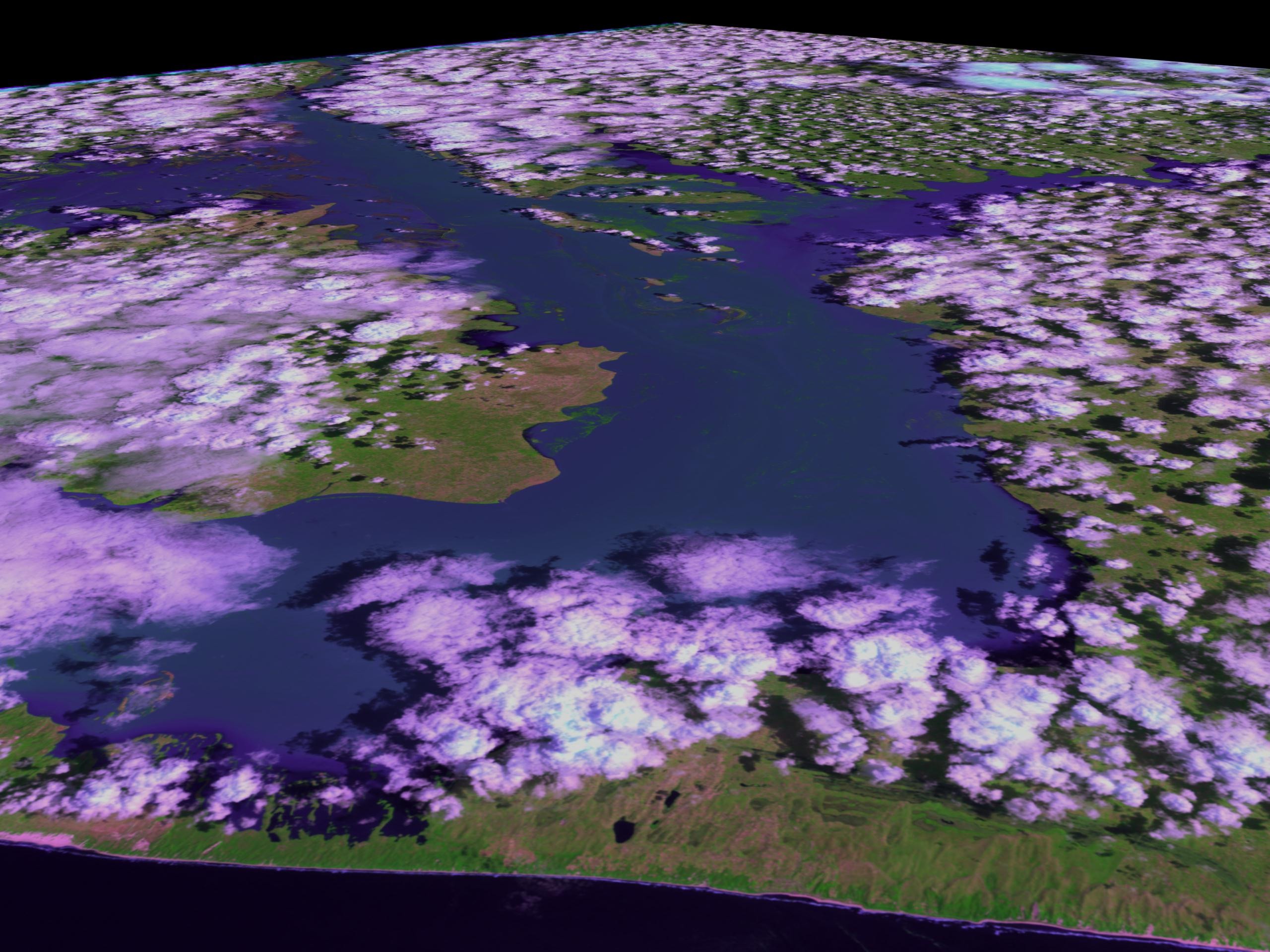
Floods in Mozambique in 2000

The 247 highway crosses the Messalo River. The major settlements on the river include Natulo and Marere (on the coast).

== Geography ==
The Messalo River drains a catchment area of 24,000 km^{2} (9,300 sq mi). It is the 8th largest river among the 18 major river basins that drain Mozambique.

Mesalo River, the second largest river in the Cabo Delgado Province in northern Mozambique, delimits on its south the coastal area, along the Indian Ocean coastal belt, in the Macomia District; other coastal area boundary limits are set by the Diquide to the south and the coast line on the east. The estuary encompasses 5,000 hectares (12,000 acres) of pristine mangrove forests unaffected by anthropogenic interference.

Agriculture

Agriculture, which is mostly at the subsistence level, practiced along rivers, swamps and lakes near the villages, covers cultivation of rice, cassava, millet, maize, sweet potatoes, beans and coconuts. Along the Messalo River, alluvial grasslands offer fertile soils that have moisture retaining potential in the dry season. These lands are used for the cultivation of rice and other crops. There are possibilities of rising two crops of rice. Rice plantation is done in Nov/Dec and harvested around May/June. However, there are complaints of crops getting destroyed due to wild life depredations.

== Fauna and flora ==
The Messalo Wildlife Area, named after the river, is a 33,000 hectares (82,000 acres) inland safari area. It is characterized by acacia and palm savannah, coastal forest, and miombo woodland. The river delta of the Messalo and the Zambezi are home to some of the most dense mangrove forests in the region.

Lion, leopard and elephant inhabit the area. The Nothobranchius sp. Messalo river MZHL 05-12 MZHL 05-12, a species of killifish endemic to the Messalo River is also an aquarium display species, which spawns on peat or similar spawn substrata and fully adopts to neutral water conditions with water temperature in the range of 24–27 °C (75–81 °F).

In the coastal estuary of the river, its wetlands are a breeding ground for birds, several fish and crustacean species. Alluvial silt is deposited in the estuary. In general, the coastal belt, which subsumes the Messalo estuary (the hot spot of biodiversity), has rich marine vegetation, apart from mangroves, such as sea grass meadows. The wild life, in the mostly uncharted region of the coastal zone, includes marine wildlife comprising turtles and dugongs in large numbers. Wildlife found consists of elephant, buffalo, various antelope (waterbuck, eland, greater kudu, sable, suni, oribi, duiker), pigs and primates, elephant shrew, predators such as hyena, leopard, wild dog (in packs of 20 or more), lion (in large numbers of 2000 or more); African elephant and the wild dog species are categorized as 'endangered' in the IUCN Red List of Threatened Animals. Elephants, black rhinoceros, impala, zebra, Lichtenstein's hartebeest, wildebeest, cheetah and reedbuck, though reported in the past, await reconfirmation. The coastal zone does not have any human population within its limits, except for a few villages along the 10 kilometres (6.2 mi) stretch of main road to Mocimboa de Praia (Macomia-Mocimboa road) bordering the project boundary. Fishing is an important vocation for the people living in the estuary, though "Transient fishermen" competing with them in this economic activity is a disadvantage. Molluscs and crustaceans are gathered by women in the intertidal zone for their consumption. Sea cucumbers are also harvested and dried for commercial sale. White lime or building material is produced by using specific varieties of gastropods (Chicoreus ramosus, Fasciolaria trapezium).
