= 2024 Mucojo attack =

2024 attack on soldiers in Mozambique

- Part of Insurgency in Cabo Delgado
Date	February 9, 2024
Location	Mucojo, Mozambique
Result	Islamic State victory

Belligerents
Mozambique	Islamic State; Mozambique Province

Casualties and losses
25 killed	Unknown

On February 9, 2024, militants from the Islamic State – Mozambique Province stormed a military position of the Mozambique Defence Armed Forces on Friday morning 9 February 2024 in Mucojo, Macomia District in the Cabo Delgado Province, Mozambique.

25 soldiers were killed in the attack. The death toll was confirmed by the Macomia district administrator Tomás Badae. There was no way out for the soldiers, because the roads leading to Mucojo were closed by the attackers, and because of communication problems, it is unclear if the militants are still in Mucojo. Some civilians were forced to carry food to an area north of Mucojo. There were no civilians killed or injured in the attack. There are no reports about casualties on the attackers side.

The Islamic State claimed they had killed 20 soldiers in the clash. It was the second time within two months that Mucojo was attacked and occupied by the militants. It was also the deadliest attack on Mozambique troops since 2021.

== See also ==
- Battle of Mucojo
