= 2021 Cabo Delgado offensives =

Aspect of ongoing armed conflict in Mozambique

- Part of the War against the Islamic State, the insurgency in Cabo Delgado
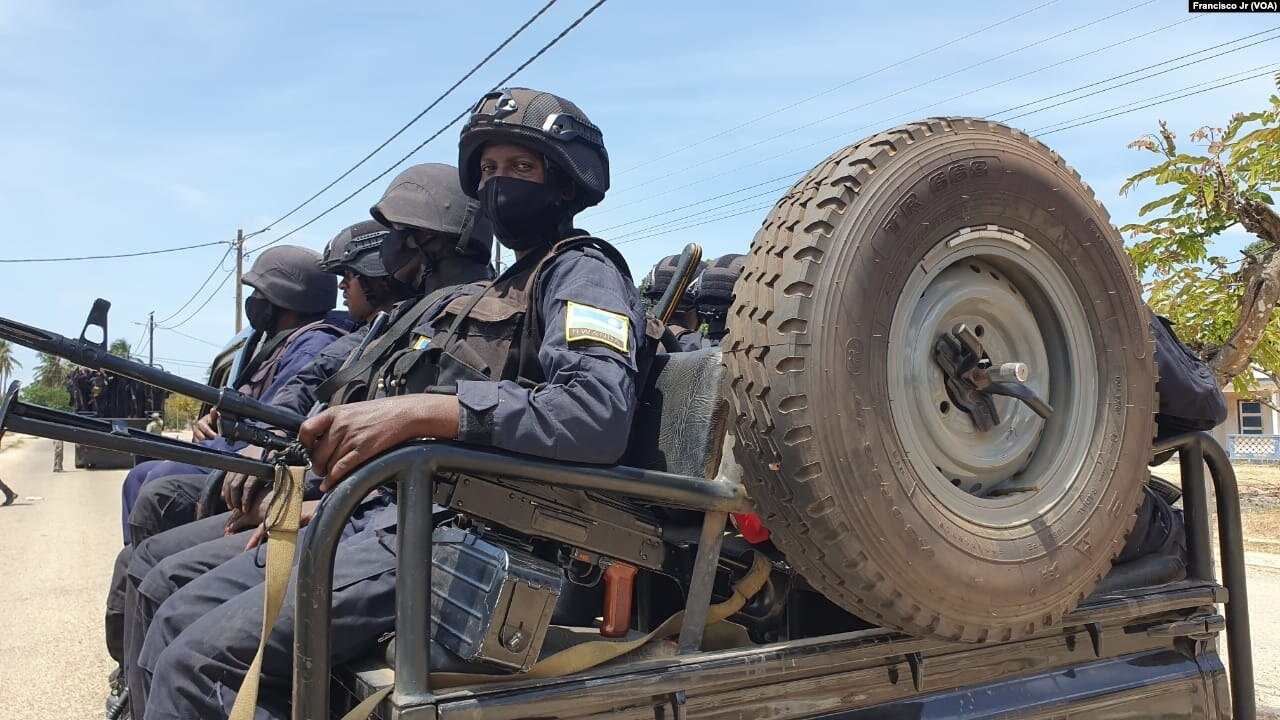
- Rwandan forces in Mocimboa da Praia, October 2021
Date	July – August 2021 (first offensive); August – late September 2021 (second offensive); October – November 2021 (minor offensives)
Location	Cabo Delgado Province, Mozambique; spillovers into Niassa Province and Mtwara Rural
Status	Pro-government victory: Much territory retaken in Cabo Delgado Province; Reduction of rebel activity; Insurgents launch counter-offensive in November 2021
Territorial changes	Mocímboa da Praia and other areas retaken by Mozambican government

Belligerents
Mozambique; Rwanda; SADC: Tanzania; South Africa; Botswana; Lesotho	Islamic State

Commanders and leaders
(Mozambique) Cristóvão Artur Chume (Rwanda) Innocent Kabandana (Rwanda) "Frank" (South Africa) Xolani Mankayi	Bonomade Machude Omar (alias "Ibn Omar") "Sheikh Dr. Njile North"; Rajab Awadhi Ndanjile † "Muhamudu" †

Units involved
Mozambique Defence Armed Forces (FADM); Rwanda Defence Force (RDF): Special Forces Brigade; Standby Force Mission in Mozambique (SAMIM): (South Africa) SANDF special forces; (South Africa) 43 South African Brigade; (Botswana) BDF special forces; Cabo Delago Province militias (Tanzania) Tanzanian police (border defense)	Islamic State's Central Africa Province (IS-CAP); Al-Shabaab

Strength
(Mozambique) ? (Rwanda) 1,000; 738	Unknown

Casualties and losses
(Mozambique) Unknown (Rwanda) 4+ killed, several wounded (Tanzania) 1 killed (Lesotho) 1 wounded	70 killed (by 5 August)

From July to November 2021, the Mozambique Defence Armed Forces (FADM) and Rwanda Defence Force (RDF), and belligerents from Southern African Development Community (SADC) states, conducted offensives in Cabo Delgado Province, Mozambique, against local rebels loyal to the Islamic State's Central Africa Province (IS-CAP). The first offensive succeeded in retaking the important town of Mocímboa da Praia which had previously fallen to rebels as a result of the insurgency in Cabo Delgado.

== Background ==
The insurgency in Cabo Delgado Province began in 2017 when radicalized locals took up arms. Despite the area's wealth in natural resources, it had long been neglected and marginalized by the Mozambican central government. The rebels belonged to an Islamist group known by a variety of names, locally called al-Shabaab. The Mozambican government mismanaged the crisis, and the Mozambique Defence Armed Forces (FADM) were unable to crush the rebellion. From 2018, there were growing indications that the local rebels had begun to align with the Islamic State (IS). The group and its regional branch, IS-CAP, eventually started to describe the Cabo Delgado insurgents as their followers. In 2020, the rebels were able to greatly expand their influence, even capturing the strategically important town of Mocímboa da Praia in a major offensive. In early 2021, the insurgents reduced their activity geographically, and instead focused on well-defended areas which were still controlled by the government in the insurgency's core zones. Most importantly, the rebels attacked and destroyed the town of Palma from March to April 2021. By mid-2021, around 3,000 people had been killed and up to 800,000 civilians been displaced as a result of the insurgency. The gradual escalation of violence has given rise to self-defense militias, many of whom are formed by ex-FADM soldiers and civil war veterans. Even though these groups claim to oppose the rebels, and are known to be fairly effective fighters, some militias are suspected of criminal activities as well as cooperation with the insurgents. Militias are also known to murder and torture suspected rebels and captured insurgents.

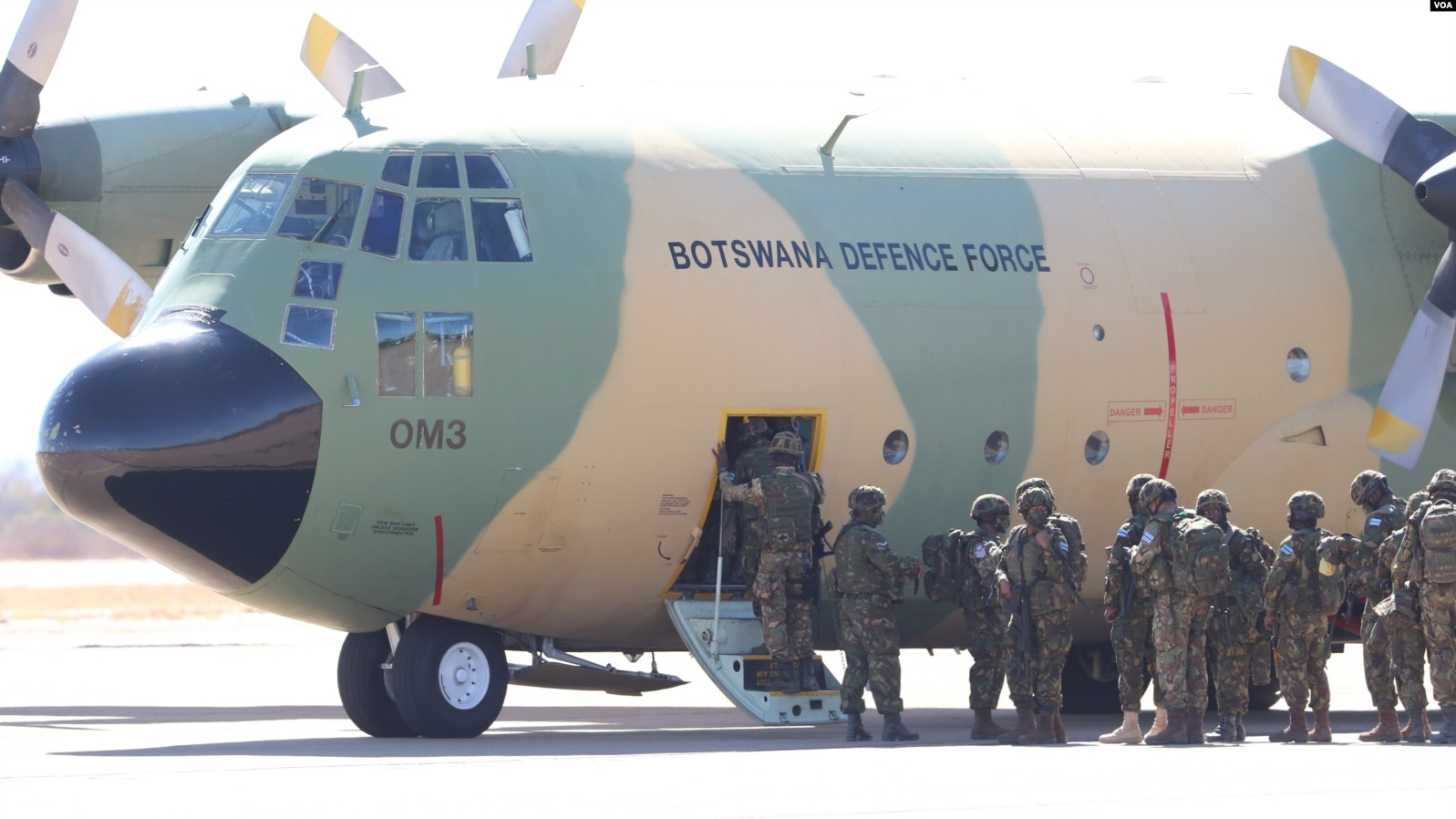
Botswana soldiers board a Botswana Defence Force plane to Mozambique, July 2021

On 9 July 2021, Rwanda sent 1,000 personnel (700 soldiers, 300 policemen) to assist the Mozambican government against the rebels. The contingent is led by Maj. Gen. Innocent Kabandana, an ex-special forces commander and veteran of the Rwandan Civil War. The Rwanda Defence Force (RDF) is known for being a well-trained and well-equipped force. The states of the Southern African Development Community (SADC) also sent units, while other foreign states such as Portugal started support missions. SADC assembled the so-called "Standby Force Mission in Mozambique" (SAMIM) commanded by South African Major General Xolani Mankayi, a veteran of the South African National Defence Force's intervention in the Burundian Civil War. However, the initial SADC force consisted of just 738 soldiers and 19 civilian experts, limiting its ability to operate and provide effective military aid to Mozambique. As international troops became more involved in the Cabo Delago insurgency, IS simultaneously increased the number of claims for attacks in Mozambique.

== Offensives ==
=== First offensive ===
Soon after their arrival, the Rwandans launched an offensive alongside FADM. Simultaneous to this offensive, Tanzania strengthened its border defenses, with the Tanzanian police carrying out operations to catch retreating rebels in Kibiti District. The FADM-RDF forces receive substantial backing by local militias. The Rwandans first focused on Palma, Nangade, and Mueda districts, proceeded to Muidumbe, and finally began to advance into Mocímboa da Praia District whose north became the offensive's main area. The RDF-led forces began a two-pronged attack aimed at retaking Mocímboa da Praia, with one force advancing from Palma along the coast, while the other moved from the south-west using the N380 road.

The Rwandans quickly broke through rebel defenses in the N380 corridor and seized the important town of Diaca. From 24 July to at least 28 July, IS-CAP and pro-government forces clashed at Awasse; IS claimed that its forces had put up a fierce defense and killed several pro-government soldiers. It was later confirmed that the Rwandans had indeed suffered several casualties during the battle of Awasse. In turn, the RDF claimed to have killed many rebels. Later on, the joint Rwandan-Mozambican forces and allied militias fully captured the strategically important settlement after Awasse's garrison retreated to Mocímboa da Praia. These successes were attributed to the Rwandans' ability to react quickly and professionally to repeated rebel ambushes along the roads. On 27 July, rebels raided the village of Chacamba, killing and kidnapping several civilians.

From 28 to 30 July, insurgents battled security forces and militias at Chai, Macomia District, as the rebels repeatedly attacked the local army barracks. On 30 July, RDF and FADM skirmished with insurgents at Nova Familia, Nangade District, during which three Rwandans were wounded and 13 rebels killed. the insurgents fled, raiding a nearby a nearby village before escaping into the bush. Meanwhile, IS repeatedly made claims of its forces raiding villages in Cabo Delgado throughout July, reportedly killing many militiamen. These attacks mostly took place in areas which were outside the offensive's area, suggesting that IS was trying to draw attention away from its failing defense in Mocímboa da Praia District.

The Rwandan and Mozambican troops as well as the militias moved along the N380, and were able to enter western Mocímboa da Praia on 1 August. Fighting intensified on the next day, as the Mozambican Navy conducted an amphibious landing of FADM and RDF troops with aerial support by Mozambican helicopters. Combat passed in the following night. The pro-government forces resumed their assault on 3 August, and were able to mostly evict the rebels from the settlement after intense clashes. Despite the substantial resistance, however, the insurgents appeared to spare their resources, operating in smaller groups and using hit-and-run tactics instead of trying to fully stop the government advance. Meanwhile, joint FADM-RDF columns continued advanced in the N380 corridor and further south in Mocímboa da Praia District, while FADM helicopters attacked suspected insurgents at Quelimane village and the mouth of the Messalo River. Fighting was also reported at Awasse, Chinda, and Mbau. By 4 August, the pro-government forces cobducted smaller-scale clearing operations in Mocímboa da Praia. In the next days, the rebels carried out a number of counter-attacks against Mocímboa da Praia, and raided the settlements of Mandimba, Chacamba, Nune, and Quissama in Nangade District.

On 8 August, the Rwandan military spokesman Ronald Rwivanga declared that the RDF and FADM had retaken Mocímboa da Praia from the insurgents. The FADM later claimed that at least 33 rebels at been killed in the fighting at the town, and that important insurgent commanders had been captured without providing evidence for these statements. The town was left depopulated and largely destroyed. The pro-government forces then began to secure the area around the town, while preparing for a further push southward. On 10 August, FADM helicopters killed two civilians. Security force began to construct a new bridge across the Messalo River on the next day, intending to use it for the next offensive operations.

=== Second offensive ===
After fully securing Mocímboa da Praia, the combined Rwandan and Mozambican units launched another offensive south of the town. This operation initially concentrated on southern Mocímboa da Praia District, but also seemed to extend into the districts of Macomia and potentially Quissanga. The SADC states also began to assist the offensive, with SAMIM troops becoming involved in combat operations for the first time.

By 14 August, security forces were possibly clashing with rebels at Mbau, Mangoma, and Ntotwe. On the same day, Tanzanian and Batswana soldiers reportedly battled rebels at Chicuaia Velha, Nangade District. On 18 August government forces recaptured Marere south of Mocimboa da Praia. On 20 August government forces captured Mbau, killing 11 militants. Mbau had served as the rebels' "military and spiritual headquarters"; the RDF later reported that the insurgents had even built bunkers there. On the same day, rebels reportedly ambushed SAMIM troops in Naquitengue, near Mbau, and attacked the RDF at Naquitengue, reportedly resulted in 12 insurgent deaths. Three days later, Rwandan troops captured an insurgent base called "Ubaua" in Quissanga District; the base was possibly already abandoned, as no fighting was reported. On the same day, a FADM soldier accidentally killed a civilian in Chitunda without being punished for this, resulting in locals complaining about the military acting with impunity. On 24 August, rebels massacred ten fishermen at Mucojo, Macomia District. Two days later, the FADM stopped a boat which was possibly smuggling food supplies to rebels off Mocimboa da Praia District. A joint FADM-RDF unit captured a rebel base near Ntchinga, Muidumbe District, on 27 August. On 28 August, SAMIM troops reportedly raided an insurgent position at Muera River, capturing equipment and documents.

On 1 September, the RDF and rebels battled along the Messalo River valley, with the Rwandans claiming to have inflicted heavy losses on their opponents. Rebels counter-attacked in Mocímboa da Praia District on 3 September, aiming at Mocímboa da Praia town and the area close to Muera River. The attacks against the town were reported as being launched from the north and west, suggesting that the insurgents were still present in substantial numbers in the districts of Palma and Nangade. Meanwhile, SAMIM troops of Tanzanian and Basotho origin began deployment to Nangade. In addition, security forces had begun to resettle displaced civilians at Palma which had mostly been deserted since early 2021. By mid-September, pro-government forces were reportedly attempting to eliminate the rebel base known as "Siri 1" in southern Mocímboa da Praia District, and heavy fighting was still reported in the Messalo River valley. On 12 September, insurgents ambushed a Rwandan convoy between Mbau and Indegue, Mocímboa da Praia District, with a land mine. SAMIM troops also began to deploy in Niassa Province; groups of insurgents were suspected of having retreated or otherwise relocated to Niassa. Other bands of rebels were moving further south, away from the combat zone of the Messalo River. These groups relocated to Quissanga and Macomia District, where the rebels began a series of attacks on local villages, massacring dozens of civilians. SAMIM claimed to have captured the "Sheikh Ibrahim base" in northern Macomia District from rebels on 14 September.

On 20 September, rebels launched a raid into Tanzania, targeting the minor village of Kagera, Mtwara Rural, where they looted, kidnapped and murdered civilians. Two days later, SAMIM soldiers attacked a rebel camp near Quiterajo, Macomia District, killing five militants and freeing 87 abducted civilians. On 23 September, insurgents launched attacks at the N380 road, ambushing Mozambican soldiers near Namoja, Quissanga District, and raiding the towns of Lindi, Songueia, and Quissanga II. Local civilians claimed that these attacks had been actually conducted by rogue policemen and militiamen, although they provided no proof for their allegations. Rebels also raided Tapara, northern Quissanga District, on the same day.

On 24 September, SAMIM reported that its troops had destroyed a rebel base near Chitama, southeastern Nangade District, killing 17 insurgents. The pro-government forces suffered two losses during the operation, with one Tanzanian soldier killed and one Basotho soldier wounded. Meanwhile, the RDF and FADM claimed to have captured the "Siri I" and "Siri II" bases as well as several villages from the rebels. On 25 September, pro-government forces reportedly overran another militant base at Chitama, killing several rebels including a commander named Rajab Awadhi Ndanjile who had led the rebel forces operating in Nangade District and a founding member of the insurgency. At the end of September, the Rwandans gave a press conference in Mbau, claiming that the insurgents had been mostly evicted from the RDF's areas of operation. According to Cabo Ligado, their statements effectively passed the responsibility of combating the remaining rebels south of the Messalo River to SAMIM and FADM.

=== Continued pro-government operations ===
From late September to early October, rebels continued hit-and-run attacks on civilian targets in Mueda, Nangade, and Palma, killing and kidnapping several civilians, while several reports emerged according to which pro-government militias and Mozambican security forces were abusing civilians and killing prisoners. On 1 October, FADM and insurgents battled at Miangalewa. Five days later, pro-government forces ambushed insurgents in Limala, southern Mocimboa da Praia District, killing a rebel leader known as "Muhamudu". By 13 October, SAMIM resumed its offensive operations, freeing 47 kidnapped civilians at Bilibiza and Namuluco, Quissanga District.

On 20 October, rebels launched another raid into Tanzania, targeting Kilimahewa village, Tandahimba District. They burnt a warehouse and captured several civilians, although a TPDF contingent arrived in time to rescue the hostages. For the rest of the month, insurgents attacked civilians in Macomia District. Four days later, SAMIM reportedly destroyed three rebel bases in northern Macomia District, rescuing 13 kidnapped civilians. Surviving militants fled to the north of the Messalo River. A joint RDF-FADM force overran an ad hoc rebel camp at Naquitengue, near Mbau, on 27 or 29 October, reportedly killing 20 militants and capturing vehicles as well as weaponry. Around the same time, SAMIM killed 5 rebels during a clash in Quissanga District. From 1 to 10 November, SADC conducted a minor offensive in eastern Muidumbe District; the operation reportedly succeeded in destroying a number of rebel bases. On 6–7 November, five rebels voluntarily surrendered to pro-government forces in Macomia and Muidumbe District. This was unusual, as the insurgents severely punish any desertion, while government forces often outright murder or torture any captured rebels; according to Cabo Ligado researchers, the surrenders thus suggest that the supply situation of the insurgents had become very dire. Rebels also attacked Ntuleni, between Palma and Mocimboa da Praia, on 7 November, but a combined RDF-FADM force pursued, cornered and destroyed the raiding party with the help of drones.

== Aftermath ==
By mid-November, the rebels were conducting a counter-offensive to counter the pro-government advances of the previous months. From 8 to 14 November, the rebels increased their attacks on settlements, targeting Lijungo, Nangade District, and the villages of 5º Congresso, Nanjaba, and Nambini in Macomia District. The Islamic State claimed responsibility for some of these raids and other attacks on civilian targets in the area. The raids prompted pursuits by joint FADM-SAMIM groups that managed to catch up with the Lijungo and 5º Congresso attackers, killing several. In addition, FADM-SAMIM troops successfully ambushed insurgents at Mandimba, eastern Nangade District, on 9 November, while militiamen claimed to have killed four rebels near 5º Congresso three days later. The rebels also expanded their operations in Mueda District, raiding several localities from 12 to 16 November, and launching more cross-border attacks into Tanzania. Pinnacle News claimed that the rebels set up a new base at Nambungali, northern Mueda District. Clashes also continued further south from 18 to 19 November, centered at 5º Congresso and other sites in Nangade as well as Macomia Districts. Two days later, insurgents attempted to storm a camp in Mueda District, but were repelled by a local militia.

By the end of November, northern Macomia District was heavily contested, and the insurgents appeared to have moved their operations partially into Niassa Province. Despite this, the government offensives had greatly weakened the rebels by the end of 2021, with a significant reduction of fatalities being reported due to fighting.

== Analysis ==
The reconquest of Mocímboa da Praia was a major symbolic and strategic success for the Mozambican government, especially as it had previously struggled to contain the rebellion. Furthermore, the town can be used as staging point for further counter-insurgency operations and opens up roads, possibly ending the state of siege for several northern communities. Even though the first offensive was a success, however, the pro-government forces were unable to inflict substantial casualties on the insurgents. The RDF admitted by 5 August that just 70 rebels had been killed up to that point. In addition, the government forces were not able to rescue kidnapped civilians. Overall, the Islamists appeared to have conducted a fighting retreat during the first offensive, evacuating their personnel and sparing their fighters for future battles instead of holding territory.

Observers argued that the intervention of Rwandan troops had proven crucial for the first offensive, as their support had enable the FADM to break through in areas such as the N380 corridor where its previous counter-insurgency operations had failed to dislodge the rebels. In contrast to FADM soldiers who often retreated when ambushed by rebels, the RDF soldiers have the "training, leadership, and experience" to break through ambushes. Analysts of the Cabo Ligado project argued that this was the main difference to the Mozambican security forces, as the Rwandans differed very little in their operational doctrine from the FADM. The Rwandans have also won approval from local civilians due to their disciplined conduct and attempts to treat locals fairly. Many locals began to treat the Rwandans as "heroes", waving Rwandan flags and acquiring pictures of Rwandan President Paul Kagame. In sharp contrast, the locals generally suspect Mozambican security forces of being abusive and corrupt, although thousands of locals signed up to join the military or police to protect their families.

By mid-September 2021, surrendered rebels described the insurgency as being in a state of chaos, with many militants deserting. Kidnapped civilians also stated that the rebels had begun to suffer from a significant lack of supplies. In the next two months, the rebels were struggling to gather food, as the pro-government forces had driven them off their fields. However, the rebels were still capable of offensive actions, as proven when they launched a counter-offensive in November 2021. Cabo Ligado argued that despite having been weakened, "IS-affiliated insurgents in northern Mozambique are proving resilient".
