= Xitaxi massacre =

2020 mass murder in Mozambique

- Part of Insurgency in Cabo Delgado
- Location: Xitaxi, Muidumbe District, Mozambique
- Date: April 7, 2020
- Deaths: 52+
- Perpetrator: Islamic State - Central Africa Province
- Motive: Refusal from civilians to join ISCAP

On April 7, 2020, jihadists from Islamic State – Central Africa Province in Mozambique killed at least fifty-two young civilians in Xitaxi, Muidumbe District, Mozambique after the young men of the village refused to join the group. The massacre was one of the deadliest massacres perpetrated by Mozambique's cell of the Islamic State.

== Background ==
Beginning in 2017, radicalized Islamists in northern Mozambique's Cabo Delgado Province began conducting attacks on villages and Mozambican Armed Forces (FADM) across the province, and attempting to create an Islamic State in Mozambique. The group gained recognition from Islamic State affiliates in the DRC, and became part of Islamic State – Central Africa Province (ISCAP). In early 2020, ISCAP launched offensives against FADM across Cabo Delgado, seizing roads and territory in Quissanga and Muidumbe. The group even captured Mocímboa da Praia briefly.

== Massacre ==
When ISCAP invaded the town of Xitaxi in early April, they attempted to recruit the young men of the town into joining the group. The young men refused, and were called to a meeting in the center of the town. They were subsequently all "brutally and cruelly" beheaded by the militants. At least fifty-two people were killed in the massacre, and FADM and Mozambican provincial police only gained access to Xitaxi weeks after the massacre.

== Aftermath ==
Many of Xitaxi's residents and families of the victims fled the town after the massacre, with many ending up in refugee camps across the country. A survivor of the massacre speaking to Mail and Guardian stated that the bodies were abandoned in the immediate aftermath of the attack, and some were eaten by dogs. The Xitaxi massacre was one of the deadliest massacres committed by ISCAP since the start of the insurgency.

Mozambican interior minister Amade Miquidade stated that on April 7, thirty-nine ISCAP militants were killed when they attempted to attack the city of Muidumbe. Fifty-nine more were killed in a battle on the Quirimbas Islands on April 10, and thirty-one more were killed in a battle on Ibo Island between April 11 and 13.
