= Al-Shabaab (Mozambique) =

Islamist militant group active in Cabo Delgado Province, Mozambique

- Leaders: Abu Yasir Hassan; Bonomade Machude Omar (alias Ibn Omar) †; Farido Selemane Arune
- Dates active: 2015–present
- Headquarters: Mbau (2020–2021); Siri (2018-2021) "Seina" (2024-)
- Active regions: Cabo Delgado Province, Niassa Province, Mozambique and Kitaya, Mtwara Region, Tanzania
- Ideology: Sunni Islamism; Salafism; Salafi jihadism
- Size: 300 (2025)
- Part of: Islamic State (elements)
- Wars: the Islamist insurgency in Mozambique

Al-Shabaab (Arabic: الشباب, lit. 'The Youth'), also known as Ansar al-Sunna (Arabic: أنصار السنة, transl. 'Supporters of the Tradition') or Ahlu Sunna Wal Jammah, is an Islamist militant group active in Cabo Delgado Province, Mozambique. Since October 2017, it has waged an insurgency in the region, seeking to undermine the secular FRELIMO government and establish an Islamic state. It has occasionally captured territory from the government and has been accused of committing atrocities against civilians.

Although al-Shabaab's precise historical origins are not clear, the group has been militarily active since 2015. Its membership primarily comprises poor young Mozambicans and immigrants from other East African countries, but it has dwindled – to an estimated 300 to 1,000 troops – due to counteroffensives which have been waged by the Mozambican government and allied peacekeeping troops. Since 2019, Islamic State (IS) has formally claimed al-Shabaab as an affiliate under IS – Central Africa Province. However, it is not clear if pro-IS sentiment is universal within al-Shabaab, and, despite evidence of some contact and cooperation, the group is still functionally autonomous from IS. As a result of its IS affiliation, al-Shabaab was designated as a terrorist organisation by the United States in 2021.

== Name ==
The group calls itself Ahlu Sunna Wal Jammah (ASWJ), or the derivatives Ahlu al-Sunna, al-Sunnah, or Swahili Sunna. According to historian Eric Morier-Genoud, the term is commonly used by Muslims in northern Mozambique to identify the broader (mainstream) Muslim community in the region; and many locals therefore rejected the militants' appropriation of the name. The group is known to locals as al-Shabaab, and has to some extent reappropriated this nickname since 2020, sometimes referring to itself as al-Shabaab. It is also known locally as Mashababos.

== Organisation and structure ==
=== Ideology and objectives ===
Al-Shabaab has been described as Islamist in its ideology and objectives, insofar as it views the significance of Islam in political as well as religious terms. Its members typically reject the secularism of the existing Mozambican state (and of its ruling party, FRELIMO), and support governance under sharia. The group is typically not prolific in its distribution of propaganda, but in 2020, al-Shabaab members were filmed announcing to a local population that, "We want everyone here to apply Islamic law... We don't want a government from unbelievers, we want a government from Allah."

=== Composition ===
Al-Shabaab's primary base is Mozambique's Cabo Delgado Province, which is not only a Muslim-majority province but also one of Mozambique's poorest; the discovery in 2009 of large natural gas reserves off the coast led to "dashed expectations of rapid economic development". Many of the group's members are young people lacking formal employment and schooling (many are petty traders or fisherman), and many belong to the Muslim-majority Mwani ethnic group. Some claim that the Makonde, the largely Christian group which dominates the interior of Cabo Delgado, has received preferential treatment from the FRELIMO government. There is therefore debate about the extent to which religious extremism alone drives the insurgency: some accounts emphasise an ethnic dimension and its connection to perceived social, political, and economic marginalisation.

Similarly, there is debate about the extent to which al-Shabaab is a "homegrown" Mozambican group. International Crisis Group reports that it incorporates a sizeable contingent of foreign fighters, many of them from neighbouring Tanzania, and many of them former acolytes of Aboud Rogo, a Kenyan cleric who was linked both to al-Qaeda and to Somalia's al-Shabaab before his assassination in 2012. On some accounts, Rogo's followers were among the Mozambican al-Shabaab's founding members. Other accounts point to foreign radicalizing influences, including foreign ideologues such as Rogo and the Wahhabism inherited by Mozambican students who studied abroad in Saudi Arabia, Egypt, or Sudan. In addition to Mozambicans and Tanzanians, al-Shabaab has members who are immigrants from elsewhere in the Great Lakes region and from Somalia. Members are known to speak Portuguese, the official language of Mozambique; Kimwani, the local language in coastal Cabo Delgado; and Swahili, the lingua franca of the Great Lakes region.

According to the United States Department of State, al-Shabaab is led by Abu Yasir Hassan, who is Tanzanian by birth. The group raises funding from illicit activities, including smuggling of wood, charcoal, ivory, and rubies, and possibly human trafficking; and from external donations, including through transnational religious networks. Members have been trained locally – by hired Islamic militants from elsewhere in East Africa, or by disgruntled former police officers and security force members – or, in some cases, travelled abroad to train with other militant groups.

== History ==
=== Origins ===
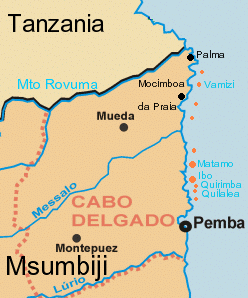
Map of Cabo Delgado Province, where al-Shabaab is active.

The precise origins of al-Shabaab are not clear. Most accounts trace the group's emergence to 2013 or 2014. However, Morier-Genoud spoke to a local Sufi sheikh who claimed that al-Shabaab was present in Mocímboa (and in conflict with local communities there) by 2010 at the latest; and al-Shabaab may also have roots in earlier sectarian groupings in the region. It is clear that the organisation emerged as a religious group among the youth of northern areas of Cabo Delgado province, and began carrying out religious activities – including building their own mosques and prayer houses in Mocímboa and elsewhere – independently of established religious leaders, whom they viewed as too close to state authorities.

There is general consensus that al-Shabaab militarised, acquiring an increasing emphasis on violent jihad, in 2015 or early 2016, probably in response to the escalating repression it faced as part as an increasingly confrontational relationship with the Mozambican government and with mainstream Islamic organisations in the region. According to International Crisis Group, al-Shabaab's membership experienced a boost in 2016 when it was joined by a contingent of expelled ruby miners. At the Mozambican national Islamic Conference in November 2016, mainstream religious leaders – mostly from the Islamic Council of Mozambique (CISLAMO) – expressed concern about the rise of al-Shabaab, described as an "emergent sect" in Cabo Delgado province and as prone to intolerance and violence. The conference identified an al-Shabaab presence in at least four districts of Cabo Delgado: Mocímboa da Praia, Montepuez, Palma, and Nangade; and possibly also Macomia and Quissanga. During this period, the group's de facto headquarters were at Mocímboa.

=== Cabo Delgado insurgency ===
Al-Shabaab rose to national and global prominence when it launched an insurgency in northern Mozambique, the ongoing insurgency in Cabo Delgado. It began with a series of attacks on police in the port town of Mocímboa de Praia on 5 October 2017. Evidence suggested that most of those involved in the attacks were locals, resident to and well known in the area. Although not particularly successful, the attacks inaugurated a long-running rural guerrilla warfare campaign by al-Shabaab, which by 2020 had killed several hundred people and displaced hundreds of thousands. During that period, the group typically operated in small units, pursuing minor military objectives, and often using blunt weapons.

However, from 2020, and beginning with a 23 March raid on Mocímboa de Praia, al-Shabaab began to stage large-scale raids, often attacking multiple district capitals in quick succession. Its new and more ambitious approach may have been facilitated by its capture of large stockpiles of weapons belonging to the Mozambican security services. Arguably its most significant military victory thus far was its capture of Mocímboa de Praia in early August 2020; it held the town for a year, until an August 2021 offensive by government and allied forces. During this period, the group was headquartered at Mbau, outside Mocímboa, although this territory was also lost in August 2021. In 2021, in a new phase of the war – now involving Southern African Development Community (SADC) peacekeeping troops – observers described al-Shabaab as capable of launching sophisticated attacks, although it had not yet demonstrated, for example, explosive device capabilities. Also since 2020, the group has apparently gained an augmented interest in political activities, distributing food and money to local populations and making political speeches critical of FRELIMO. According to American estimates, al-Shabaab attacks killed more than 1,300 civilians and displaced nearly 670,000 people in northern Mozambique between October 2017 and March 2021.

However, the government counteroffensive made some gains against the group. At the end of 2021, officials associated with the Southern African Mission in Mozambique (SAMIM) said that military operations had killed 200 militants. The mission also said that, in early February 2022, the group's fighting force had dwindled, from an estimated 3,000 troops to only 300 – though other observers estimated closer to 1,000 remained active. International Crisis Group said that the decrease in numbers was "mainly because many foreign jihadists have fled the country while Mozambican insurgents have melted into the civilian population rather than surrender or be killed".

== Relationship with the Islamic State ==
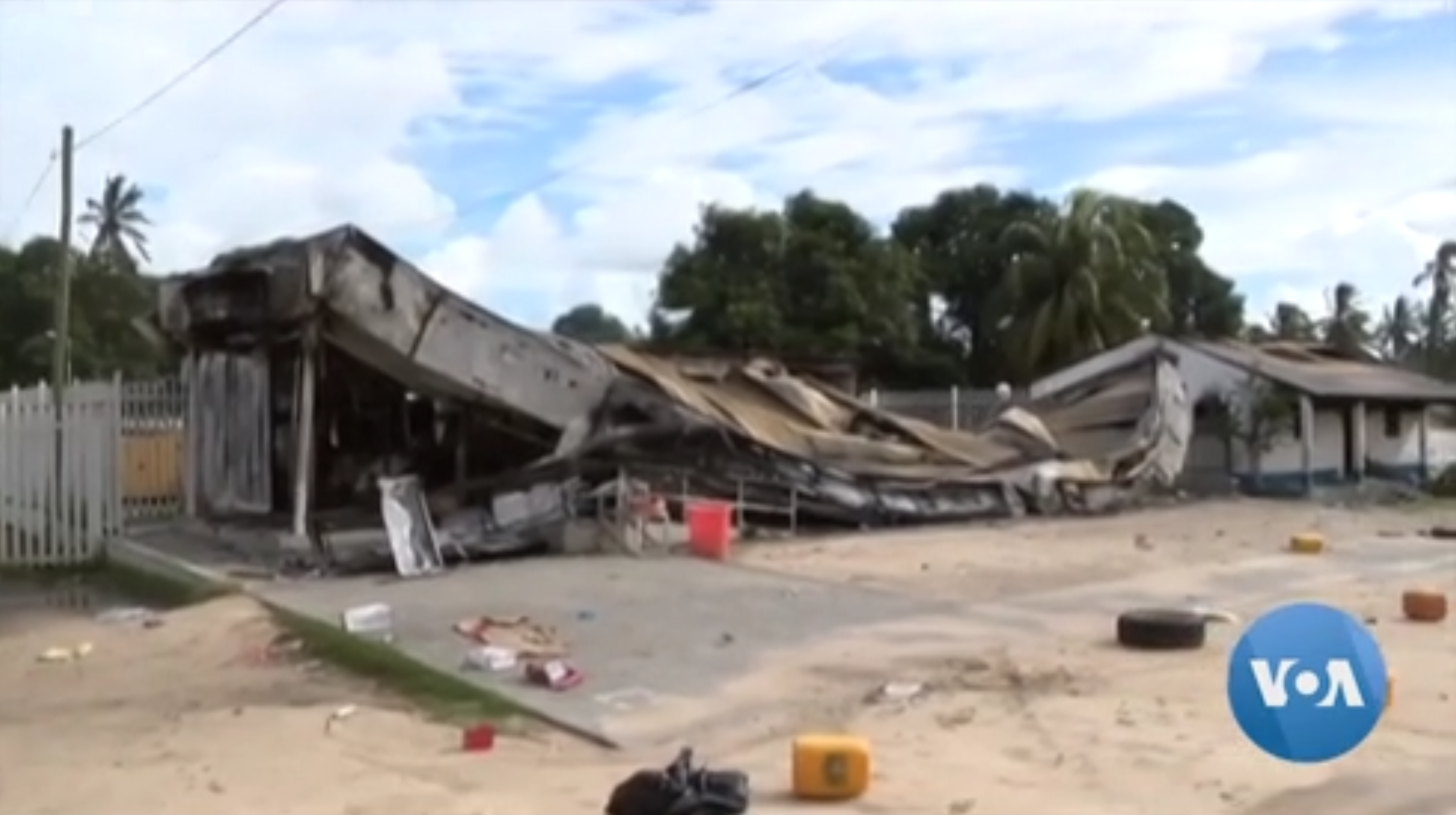
A building destroyed in the 2021 Battle of Palma.

Al-Shabaab was officially affiliated with an Islamic State branch, the Central African Province (ISCAP), although it is not clear if all members of al-Shabaab endorsed this identification. According to the United States Department of State, the Islamic State announced the launch of ISCAP in April 2019 and it acknowledged al-Shabaab as an affiliate in August 2019, although al-Shabaab may have pledged allegiance to the Islamic State as early as April 2018. For this reason, the Department of State refers to al-Shabaab as "ISIS-Mozambique". Islamic State officially claimed its first ever attack in Mozambique in June 2019, following an al-Shabaab attack on Mozambican forces in Mocímboa de Praia. During the rest of 2019, the Islamic State's media claimed responsibility for thirteen additional attacks in Mozambique under the ISCAP banner. Thereafter, however, Islamic State propaganda about ISCAP activities in Mozambique has been somewhat sparse – it took two weeks to claim al-Shabaab's 2020 seizure of Mocímboa da Praia, for example – possibly due to resource constraints at Islamic State Central.

Although reports stated that the ISIS affiliation had led to a large influx of foreign fighters which had amounted to a virtual takeover of al-Shabaab, most observers believe that al-Shabaab remains substantively autonomous from the Islamic State. According to the Combating Terrorism Center, it and other African affiliates of the Islamic State have "historically evolved under their own steam and acted with a significant degree of autonomy". Al-Shabaab also has few visible ties to the Allied Democratic Forces (ADF), ISCAP's second wing, which is based in the eastern Democratic Republic of Congo, where it has mounted a geographically and politically distinct insurgency of its own. Although there is evidence of contact between the ADF and al-Shabaab (including reports which state that some al-Shabaab leaders were trained in Congo several years ago), and although ADF-affiliated Ugandans have been arrested in Mozambique, they remain functionally "distinct groups with distinct origins".

Some reports have also suggested that religious, commercial, and military links exist – particularly via assistance with training – between al-Shabaab and other "radical Islamist" groups in Somalia, Tanzania, Kenya and the broader Great Lakes Region.

== War crimes ==
Observers charge al-Shabaab militants with numerous war crimes, including the mass murder of civilians on various occasions. In addition, the group has been accused by UNICEF and Human Rights Watch of recruiting thousands of child soldiers. Some rebel fighters were reportedly as young as twelve.

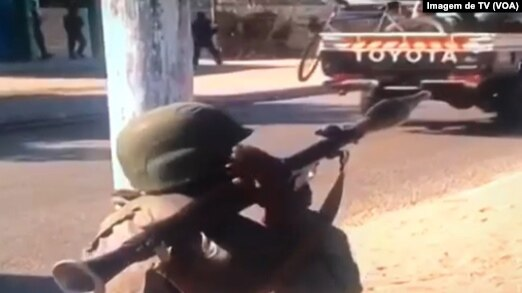
Al-Shabaab insurgent during Battle of Mocímbia da Praia (June 2020)

== Terrorist designation ==
In March 2021, the United States designated al-Shabaab as a terrorist organization, and also designated its leader, Hassan, as a Specially Designated Global Terrorist.
