= Mocímboa da Praia Airport =

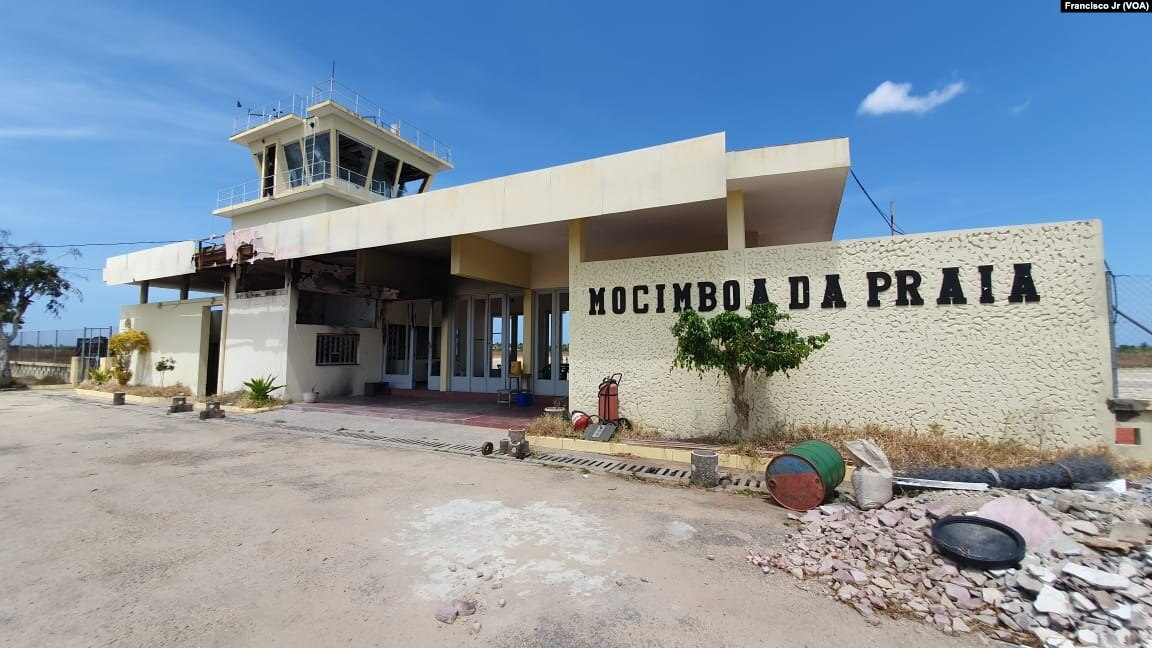
- IATA: MZB; ICAO: FQMP

Summary
- Airport type: Public
- Operator: Aeroportos de Moçambique
- Serves: Mocímboa da Praia, Mocímboa da Praia District, Cabo Delgado Province, Mozambique
- Elevation AMSL: 36 m / 118 ft
- Coordinates: 11°21′31.524″S 40°21′17.7372″E

Map
- Location of the airport in Mozambique

Runways
Direction	Length		Surface
Direction	m	ft	Surface
02/20	2,000	6,560	Asphalt
- Source: GCM, STV

Mocímboa da Praia Airport (IATA: MZB, ICAO: FQMP) is an airport in Mocímboa da Praia, Mocímboa da Praia District, in the Cabo Delgado Province of Mozambique.
