= Battle of Mucojo =

Military engagement in Mozambique

- Part of the Insurgency in Cabo Delgado
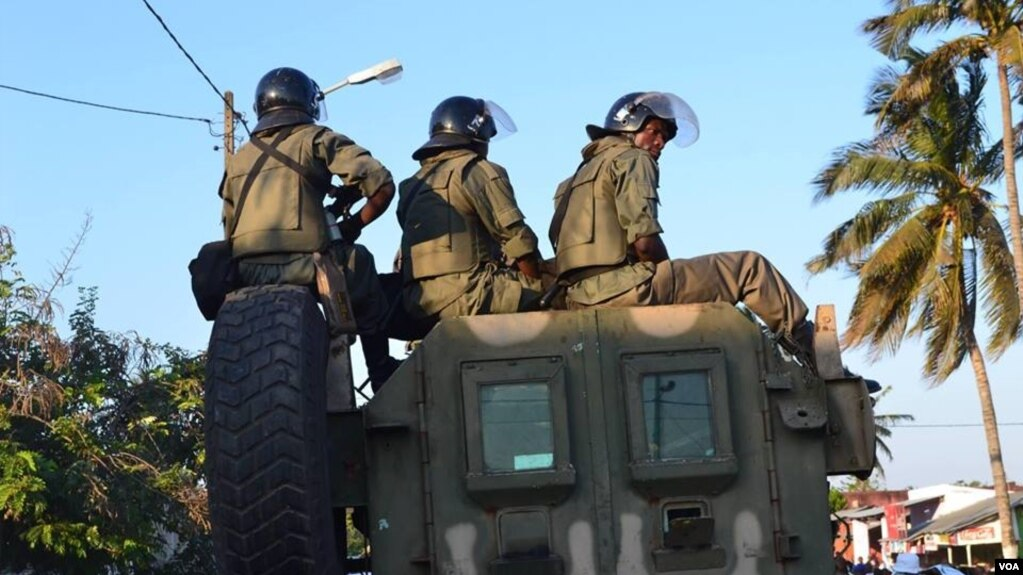
- Mozambican military in Mucojo
Date	22 April 2021 – 29 October 2021
Location	Mucojo, Macomia, Cabo Delgado, Mozambique
Result	Mozambique Victory

Belligerents
Mozambique; Rwanda	anti-Islamist militants	Islamic State; Al-Shabaab

Commanders and leaders
Unknown	Unknown	Ali (POW)

Casualties and losses
- 12+ civilians killed

The Battle of Mucojo was a military engagement between unidentified Anti-Islamist militants, Islamic State affiliates, and the Mozambique Defence Armed Forces in the coastal town of Mucojo during the Insurgency in Cabo Delgado. It started on 22 April 2021 when anti-Islamist militants took control of Mucojo and nearby villages including Lumumua. The militants started a killing spree near Mucojo after the Mozambique Army retook many villages near Mucojo.

== Battle ==
On 22 April 2021, militants took and occupied the town of Mucojo and Pangane with the Mozambican military retaking the towns. The village had been sieged by Mozambican and Rwandan troops since May 2021

On 28 August, militants of an unknown group raided and re-occupied the town of Mucojo. Reports came that the town and a nearby village were captured, with the Mozambique military confirming the claim. The militants were identified as anti-Islamic as they beheaded an Islamic imam. The militants continued to kill civilians and behead fisherman. Members of ISIL and Al-Shabaab, attacked Mucojo and killed most of the anti-Islamic militants in Mucojo and the nearby town of Quiterajo. The town's mayor was later killed by the Islamist militants with him being beheaded. The Mozambique army later retook the village, but it was recaptured by the Islamist militants when Al-Shabaab members retreated from Tanzania to Mucojo. Militants later burned the village down, with 164 houses destroyed.

On 9 September, militants raided and occupied Oluma, a village near Mucojo. The island of Vamize was also occupied by militants, off the shore of Mucojo.

On 30 September and throughout 8 October, militants had fully occupied all of the villages nearby Mucojo. On 26 October, militants in Mucojo started an offensive into southern Tanzania. On 29 October, Mozambican and Rwandan forces captured all of Mucojo, ending the occupation.

By 2022, unrest continued in Mucojo, with incidents of looting being reported.
