= MZB =

MZB may refer to:

- Marion Zimmer Bradley (1930–1999), an American author of fantasy novels
- Mocímboa da Praia Airport, Mozambique airport IATA code
- Mozabite language ISO 639-3 code
