= Siri (Mozambique) =

Coordinates: 11°41′1.32″S 40°19′29.43″E

Siri also known as Siria or Syria was a military camp and former headquarters of Al-Shabaab insurgent group in Mozambique located in Mbau administrative post in the Cabo Delgado province.

== History ==
The base was reportedly bombed in May 2020, and again in October 2020 claiming to have killed between 22 and 108 insurgents.

According to a testimony of two girls who escaped the camp, it was not hit during the May bombing. The base was located among a dense vegetation necessitating use of lanterns and lamps. Insurgents from several nationalities were present there. The camp was surrounded by a perimeter fence and included two buildings.

The base was captured by Rwandan forces in early September 2021 during the 2021 Cabo Delgado offensives, seizing large amounts of weaponry, fuel, ammunition and combat vehicles.

In late 2024 Islamists reportedly moved back to the Messalo river area setting up new HQ named "Seina" south of the river.
