= Awasse =

- Town
- Location within Mozambique
- Coordinates: 11.51047°S 40.02740°E
- Country: Mozambique
- Province: Cabo Delgado
- District: Mocímboa da Praia
- Administrative post: Diaca
- Time zone: UTC+02:00 (CAT)

Awasse is a village in Mocímboa da Praia District in Cabo Delgado Province, Mozambique.

== History ==
On 9 August 2020, Islamic State insurgents took the town of Awasse during the Mocímboa da Praia offensive. A well-carried out ambush took place on Sunday just before Awasse, killing 55 recruits and injuring 90 more. On 15 December government forces attacked Awasse but were forced to retreat by insurgents.

On 26 July 2021 government forces recaptured Awasse. Three insurgents were reportedly killed and one Rwandan soldier was injured.
