= Timeline of the Iraqi insurgency (2023) =

This is a timeline of events during the Islamic State insurgency in Iraq (2017–present) in 2023.

== Chronology ==
=== January ===
- In January 2023, 6 Iraqi security personnel, 19 IS militants and 21 civilians were killed.

=== February ===
- In February 2023, 10 Iraqi security personnel, 56 IS militants and 39 civilians were killed.

=== March ===
- In March 2023, 3 Iraqi security personnel, 42 IS militants and 28 civilians were killed.

=== April ===
- In April 2023, 2 Iraqi security personnel, 10 IS militants and 24 civilians were killed.

=== May ===
- In May 2023, 6 Iraqi security personnel, 26 IS militants and 6 civilians were killed.

=== June ===
- In June 2023, 4 Iraqi security personnel, 21 IS militants and 4 civilians were killed.

=== July ===
- In July 2023, 3 Iraqi security personnel, 12 IS militants and 3 civilians were killed.

=== August ===
- In August 2023, 1 French soldier, 4 Iraqi security personnel, 8 IS militants and 5 civilians were killed.

=== September ===
- In September 2023, 4 Iraqi security personnel, 8 IS militants and 9 civilians were killed.

=== November ===
- In November 2023, 4 Iraqi security personnel, 3 IS militants and 51 civilians were killed.

=== December ===
- In December 2023, 3 Iraqi security personnel, 10 IS militants and 2 civilians were killed.

== See also ==
- Timeline of the Islamic State (2024)
