= Timeline of the Islamic State (2024) =

2024 ISIS-related events, including airstrikes and bombings

This is a timeline of Islamic State (IS)-related events that occurred in 2024.

== Timeline ==
=== January ===
- 2 January – Nigerian airstrikes in Kwatan Dilla, Abadam killed Islamic State – West Africa Province (ISWAP) leader Ba'a Shuwa and scores of his fighters.
- 3 January – 2024 Kerman bombings: Two suicide bombings took place near a ceremony commemorating the assassination of Qasem Soleimani, killing 103 people and wounding 284 others. IS claimed responsibility for the attacks a day after.
- 4 January – In a speech published on Al-Furqan, IS spokesperson Abu Hudhayfah Al-Ansari called for supporters to attack Israeli and Jewish targets in the United States and Europe and to "avenge" the killings of Palestinians by the Israel Defense Forces during the Gaza war.
- 6 January:
  - IS claimed responsibility for an attack on a bus in Dashte Barachi, Kabul, which killed five people and injured 15 others.
  - An IS attack mortally wounded two Hashed al-Shaabi members in Saladin Governorate.
- 9 January:
  - IS killed at least 14 Syrian soldiers on a military bus near Palmyra.
  - IS claimed responsibility for a bombing on a minivan belonging to Kabul's main prison, killing three people and injuring four others.
- 11 January:
  - Iranian authorities claimed they identified the ringleader and bomb-maker of the Kerman bombings, and arrested 35 other people with alleged links to the attacks.
  - Israel Police and the Shin Bet made a joint statement announcing the arrests of two IS supporters from East Jerusalem who were planning to conduct bombing attacks against security forces in the Israeli capital.
- 12 January – Pakistani authorities captured two Islamic State – Khorasan Province (IS-K) would-be suicide bombers near Peshawar who were planning to target regional politicians.
- 14 January – IS militants shot at an Iraqi army position near Haditha, killing three soldiers and injuring one.
- 15 January:
  - 2024 Iranian missile strikes in Iraq and Syria: The Islamic Revolutionary Guard Corps (IRGC) launched airstrikes in Erbil targeting an alleged Mossad headquarter and several sites in Syria which it said were linked to IS.
  - A clash between Boko Haram and ISWAP on the islands of Kandahar and Kaduna Ruwa killed dozens of militants.
- 25 January – The US and Iraq agreed to start talks about ending the presence of the US-led coalition in the country. Iraq said that IS was defeated and the coalition's goal was accomplished.
- 28 January – 2024 Istanbul Church shooting: Two IS-affiliated gunmen shot and killed a man in Santa Maria Church, Istanbul during Sunday Mass. Both gunmen, along with 47 people with suspected ties to the attack, were arrested.
- 30 January – 2024 Sibi bombing: IS claimed responsibility for a bombing targeting an election rally for Tehreek-e-Insaf which killed four people and injured five others.

=== February ===
- 2 February – ISWAP gunmen opened fire on police officers at a police station in Gajiram, killing four.
- 7 February – 2024 Balochistan bombings: IS claimed responsibility for two bombings in Pishin and Killa Saifullah which killed at least 30 people and injured over 40 others.
- 8 February:
  - The commander of the Syrian Democratic Forces (SDF) warned that the attacks on US bases by Iran-backed militias could cause IS to resurge.
  - Under code name 'Operation Heroes-49', Turkish authorities detained 147 people who were suspected of having ties to IS.
- 9 February:
  - Pakistani forces killed Abdul Shakoor, an IS-K member it said was behind the 2024 Balochistan bombings. The Inter-Services Public Relations said that he was planning to conduct further attacks in Balochistan.
  - Mucojo attack: IS fighters conducted a raid in Mucojo, killing at least 25 Mozambican soldiers. The attack was the group's deadliest on Mozambican troops since 2021. They also killed a bus driver near Meluco, and left a note urging Christians to convert to Islam or pay a jizya, or else they would be killed.
- 12 February:
  - Pakistani forces confirmed the killing of senior IS-K leader Surat Gul during a counter-terrorism raid.
  - Filipino officials said that the mastermind of the Mindanao State University bombing was killed during a clash between IS supporters and government forces.
- 13 February:
  - Turkish police arrested a Russian citizen working at Akkuyu nuclear plant during a probe on IS.
  - An IS attack east of Hama province killed nine Syrian soldiers and injured three others.
- 15 February – Filipino officials arrested a woman declared by the United States as a facilitator for the Islamic State's Philippines branch.
- 18 February – A gun battle between Filipino troops and the IS-aligned Maute group left six soldiers and two rebels dead near Munai.
- 19 February – Allied Democratic Forces (ADF) rebels killed 13 people in Mambasa Territory, Ituri Province, in eastern Democratic Republic of the Congo.
- 20 February – ADF rebels armed with machetes and guns killed 11 people in Beni Territory.
- 24 February – Iraqi authorities said they captured two IS members during an operation outside of the country. The location of the operation was not disclosed.
- 25 February – A landmine left by IS killed 13 truffle hunters in Raqqa Governorate.

=== March ===
- 1 March – IS claimed responsibility for a roadside bombing which killed one Iraqi soldier and wounded at least four others in Tarmiya.
- 2 March – A 15-year-old boy who pledged allegiance to IS stabbed an Orthodox Jewish man in Zürich, Switzerland.
- 3 March – 2024 Karabulak clash: Six alleged IS members were killed during a counter-terrorism operation that resulted in a shootout in Karabulak, Russia. A man walking by was reportedly killed in the crossfire.
- 6 March:
  - IS militants killed 18 villagers collecting truffles and injured 16 others near Kobajeb, Syria. At least 50 people were missing and are suspected to have been kidnapped.
  - Mozambican authorities reported that at least 72 children were missing and suspected to be kidnapped by IS following recent jihadist attacks in Cabo Delgado.
- 7 March – The Federal Security Service (FSB) announced the killing of two Kazakh nationals in Kaluga, who were suspected to be IS militants plotting an attack against a synagogue in Moscow.
- 10 March – The Iraqi Army announced that it killed ten IS militants within the past 24 hours.
- 16 March – A landmine planted by IS in Raqqa Governorate killed 16 people and injured nine others.
- 17 March:
  - The Maute group ambushed Filipino soldiers as they were returning to their base in southern Philippines, killing four.
  - Ugandan security forces were put on high alert following a statement by deputy military spokesperson Deo Akiiki announcing that ADF rebels had crossed into the country from the Democratic Republic of the Congo.
- 19 March – German police arrested two Afghan nationals who were suspected of plotting an attack against the Swedish parliament in support of IS.
- 20 March:
  - Head of ISIS in India Haris Farooqi and his aide were arrested in Dhubri, Assam, after crossing from Bangladesh.
  - 2024 Tillabéri attack: A Niger Armed Forces unit was ambushed near Teguey, Tillabéri Region, resulting in the death of at least 23 soldiers and 30 attackers. 17 other soldiers were injured in the attack. The Islamic State claimed responsibility three days later.
- 21 March – 2024 Kandahar New Kabul Bank bombing: IS claimed responsibility for a suicide bombing at a branch of the New Kabul Bank in Kandahar, claiming it was targeting the Taliban. The Taliban claimed that three people died and 12 were injured, while the Mirwais Hospital claimed 20 people were killed and over 50 were injured.
- 22 March – IS claimed responsibility for the Crocus City Hall attack in Krasnogorsk, claiming it was targeting Christians. At least 140 people were killed and over 360 were injured.
- 23 March – Russian authorities detained 11 people in connection to the Crocus City Hall attack, including the four perpetrators.
- 24 March – An IS bomb and shooting attack killed 11 truffle hunters in Raqqa Governorate, and three others were kidnapped.
- 26 March:
  - Turkish authorities arrested 147 people suspected of having ties with IS across 30 provinces.
  - German interior minister Nancy Faeser said in a statement that IS-K poses "the greatest Islamist threat to security in Germany," and announced temporary border controls during the soccer 2024 European Championship, which begins on 14 June.
  - Spanish police arrested a man in Barcelona who they said had been carrying out "intensive efforts to encourage terrorism" and had suspected links to IS.
- 27 March – Eight members of the Maute group and seven members of the Bangsamoro Islamic Freedom Fighters surrendered to the Filipino military and handed over various firearms in Maguindanao del Sur.

=== April ===
- 2 April:
  - Iranian authorities arrested two alleged IS-K members in Qom.
  - ADF rebels killed over a dozen and kidnapped 15 others in North Kivu. The Armed Forces of the Democratic Republic of the Congo (FARDC) responded, killing four attackers and rescuing four people.
- 4 April:
  - Israel Police and Shin Bet foiled a plan by IS supporters to attack a police station in East Jerusalem and the Teddy Stadium.
  - A suspected IS suicide bombing in Sarmada killed Al-Nusra Front co-founder Abu Maria al-Qahtani and injured two of his companions.
- 6 April:
  - Iranian police arrested three IS members, including a senior operative, and detained eight others following clashes in Karaj.
  - Turkish authorities announced that they detained 48 people with suspected ties to IS.
  - A teenager was arrested in Coeur d'Alene, Idaho for plotting to attack churches across the town in the name of IS. The attack was scheduled to coincide with the end of the month of Ramadan.
- 8 April – Italian police arrested a Tajik national suspected of being an IS member after he arrived at Rome Fiumicino Airport.
- 9 April – A pro-IS media outlet published threats against stadiums holding UEFA Champions League games, prompting increased security measures.
- 11 April – A man from Baqa al-Gharbiyye was arrested by Israeli police for planning several IS attacks, including a plot to poison the Sea of Galilee.
- 12 April – German authorities arrested four teenagers planning Islamist attacks against churches and synagogues in the name of IS.
- 13 April – Swiss authorities announced that they arrested three teenagers over the Easter weekend for planning bombings in the country and allegedly supporting IS. The arrests were connected to the arrests in Germany on 12 April.
- 15 April – ADF rebels killed 10 to 15 civilians and a police officer, set vehicles on fire, and looted and set fire to a health center over the weekend in Mulekera, North Kivu Province.
- 18 April – Israeli authorities arrested an IS operative in the West Bank.
- 20 April – IS claimed responsibility for a bombing in the Koht-e Sangi neighborhood of Kabul that killed one and injured three others.
- 21 April – Iraqi authorities hanged 11 people who had been sentenced to death for joining IS.
- 24 April – Philippine law enforcement killed Abu Sayyaf militant Nawapi Abdulsaid during a gunbattle in Hadji Mohammad Ajul.
- 25 April – Fifty women and children who were family members of IS militants were handed over to a delegation from Tajikistan by Kurdish authorities in northeastern Syria.
- 30 April – Malian state TV announced the killing of senior IS commander Abu Huzeifa in Indelimane, Mali, by a joint force made up of soldiers from Mali, Burkina Faso, and Niger. Hezeifa had been linked to several attacks in the Sahel, including the Tongo Tongo ambush in 2017 that killed four American soldiers.

=== May ===
- 1 May – IS claimed responsibility for an attack on a Shiite mosque in Guzara District on 29 April that killed six worshippers and injured one.
- 10 May – The FBI and Department of Homeland Security (DHS) warned that terror groups including IS could target LGBTQIA+-related events and venues during the upcoming Pride Month.
- 13 May – Five Iraqi soldiers, including a commander, were killed in an IS attack between the governorates of Diyala and Saladin.
- 14 May – British police arrested two men accused of planning an IS-inspired attack against Jews and law enforcement in northwest England.
- 17 May – IS-K claimed responsibility for the 2024 Bamyan shooting in Afghanistan, that led to the deaths of 6 people, including 3 Spanish tourists, as well as injuring 8 people, including one Lithuanian, one Norwegian, one Australian and another Spaniard. The majority of the targeted victims were foreign tourists.
- 19 May – ADF commander and bomb-maker Anywari Al Iraq was captured by the Ugandan military.
- 20 May – Four Sri Lankan nationals were arrested at Ahmedabad Airport over suspicions of planning a terror attack on behalf of IS.
- 24 May – The FSB announced the arrests of over 20 people in connection to the Crocus City Hall attack.
- 31 May:
  - Sri Lanka Police arrested the suspected handler of the four Sri Lankans arrested on 20 May in Colombo.
  - An American airstrike near Bosaso, Somalia killed three IS militants. It was later revealed that the target was Islamic State – Somalia Province leader Abdul Qadir Mumin, but his death was unconfirmed.

=== June ===
- 4 June – Insikt Group, a cybersecurity firm part of Recorded Future, warned that extremist groups such as IS and al-Qaeda could target the 2024 Paris Olympics.
- 5 June – 2024 Beirut US embassy shooting: A gunman wearing IS insignia attacked the US embassy in Beirut, injuring a security guard.
- 6 June – Georgian authorities detained two possible IS affiliates in Batumi over illegal firearms charges.
- 7 June:
  - Suspected ADF rebels killed between 41 and 80 people in the villages of Masala, Mahihi, and Keme in Beni Territory.
  - German authorities arrested a suspected IS-K supporter in Cologne Bonn Airport.
- 9 June – Security was heightened at the 2024 ICC Men's T20 World Cup in Nassau County International Cricket Stadium after IS-K published a threat against it.
- 11 June:
  - IS senior member Abu Zainab was killed by Iraqi security forces in Raqqa, Northern Syria.
  - Eight Tajik nationals were arrested in New York City, Philadelphia, and Los Angeles over potential IS ties.
- 12 June:
  - An IS attack in the Sukhna desert, Homs Governorate, killed 16 Syrian soldiers, including an officer.
  - An attack in Mayikengo, Lubero Territory, killed at least 42 people. IS later claimed responsibility.
- 14 June:
  - Europol and Eurojust announced that European and American police shut down a large number of IS-linked online servers in the US, Germany, the Netherlands and Iceland. It also said that Spanish police arrested nine "radicalized" individuals.
  - Four IS supporters from countries such as Uzbekistan and Georgia were sanctioned by the US following a joint investigation with Turkey.
  - Fifteen suspected IS supporters were arrested in Bishkek and other parts of Kyrgyzstan.
- 16 June:
  - Rostov-on-Don pre-trial detention center hostage crisis: Six IS-linked prisoners were killed by Russian forces after taking two prison guards hostage in Rostov-on-Don.
  - CENTCOM claimed that it executed a targeted killing via an airstrike in Syria on senior IS official and facilitator Usamah Jamal Muhammad Ibrahim al-Janabi.
- 17 June:
  - A man was arrested in 'Ara, Israel, over suspected plans to join Islamic State – Somalia Province.
  - Spanish media reported that the IS-linked propaganda center I'lam Foundation was dismantled and a planned attack on Real Madrid fans and players in Santiago Bernabéu Stadium was thwarted in the previous week.
- 18 June – US officials warned that IS – Somalia Province could host top leaders of the wider organization, including its caliph, Abu Hafs al-Hashimi al-Qurashi.
- 19 June – An Iraqi national was detained by German authorities in Esslingen for planning to conduct attacks on behalf of IS.
- 23 June:
  - The Niger Armed Forces claimed that it killed senior IS member Abdoulaye Souleymane Idouwal during a raid in the Tillabéri Region.
  - 2024 Dagestan attack: The Institute for the Study of War suspected that the Islamic State – Caucasus Province was responsible for the attacks in Derbent and Makhachkala, Dagestan, that killed 20 people.
- 24 June:
  - The Turkish Interior Ministry announced that 31 people with suspected ties to IS were detained during a week-long operation.
  - Malaysian authorities arrested eight people with suspected ties with IS over the weekend.
- 26 June – The DHS identified over 400 Central Asian immigrants who entered the United States through an IS-linked smuggling ring within the past three years, 50 of whom remain unaccounted for.
- 29 June:
  - Five bombs planted by IS years earlier were discovered by UNESCO in the walls of al-Nouri Mosque.
  - 2024 attack on the Israeli embassy in Belgrade: A man attacked the Israeli embassy in Belgrade, Serbia, with a crossbow, wounding a security guard before being shot dead. He had earlier pledged allegiance to IS.

=== July ===
- 6 July – Canadian authorities charged a woman with terrorism-related offenses after she left for Syria to join IS.
- 7 July – A senior IS commander was killed by Taliban forces during a raid in Nangarhar Province.
- 8 July – A Russian playwright and theatre director were sentenced to six years in prison for "justifying terrorism" over a play based on the stories of women who were recruited by IS.
- 10 July – An Iraqi court sentenced the widow of former IS leader Abu Bakr al-Baghdadi to death for collaborating with the organization and detaining Yazidi women.
- 13 July – Four Iraqi police officers were killed and three were injured during clashes with IS in Diyala Governorate.
- 14 July – Iraqi authorities recovered 139 bodies of IS victims in the mass grave-turned Alo Antar hole, west of Mosul.
- 15 July:
  - An Israeli airstrike on a car on the al-Saboura highway in Syria killed prominent businessman Mohammad Baraa Qatarji, who was sanctioned by the US for links to IS and the Syrian government.
  - 2024 Muscat mosque shooting: Three suicide attackers targeted a Shiite mosque in Wadi Kabir, Oman, killing six people and wounding at least 28 others. IS claimed responsibility the following day.
- 17 July – CENTCOM reported that IS attacks in Iraq and Syria were set to double compared to 2023.
- 25 July – Turkish authorities detained 72 people linked to IS across 13 provinces.
- 27 July – Belgian authorities charged three Chechen natives of planning a terrorist attack on behalf of IS-K.
- 31 July – A father and son were charged for planning a terrorist attack on behalf of IS in Toronto, Canada.

=== August ===
- 2 August – A British man was sentenced to 11 years in prison by the Birmingham Crown Court for being a member of IS.
- 7 August – 2024 Vienna terrorism plot: Austrian authorities arrest two men over terror plot on Taylor Swift concerts in Vienna inspired by IS and al-Qaeda. A third suspect was arrested two days later.
- 8 August – The United Nations' counterterrorism office warned that IS-K increased its capabilities and could potentially carry out more attacks outside of Afghanistan. It also warned that parts of Africa from Mali to northern Nigeria could fall to IS and its allies.
- 9 August – Delhi Police arrested Rizwan Ali, a wanted member of IS's Pune module, on the Delhi-Faridabad border.
- 11 August – ISKP claims responsibility for an explosion on a bus in the Hazara-dominated Dashte Barchi area in Kabul, killing 1 civilian and injuring 13 others.
- 22 August – Shin Bet announced that an Israeli doctor for Soroka Medical Center was indicted earlier in August for pledging allegiance to IS.
- 23 August:
  - 2024 Solingen stabbings: A stabbing at a festival in Solingen, Germany killed three people and injured eight others. ISIS claimed responsibility the following day, claiming that it targeted Christians in response to the killing of Muslims in Palestine and elsewhere.
  - Surovikino penal colony hostage crisis: Four IS-linked prisoners took twelve people hostage at the IK-19 penal colony in Surovikino, Russia. Four prison staff were killed and three others were injured. The perpetrators were subsequently killed by snipers.
  - Iranian authorities arrested 14 IS-K members in raids in four provinces throughout the country.
- 25 August – Turkish authorities arrested 72 people suspected of collaborating with IS during an operation across 13 cities.
- 29 August – A joint US and Iraqi raid in four areas of western Iraq killed 15 IS members and injured seven US personnel.
- 30 August:
  - Turkish authorities detained 119 suspected IS associates in an operation across 23 provinces.
  - ISWAP claims responsibility for an attack on a school in Yobe holding Shias, killing 3 students.

=== September ===
- 1 September:
  - Iraqi Prime Minister Mohammed Shia' Al Sudani declared that IS was no longer a threat to Iraq.
  - The US and SDF captured senior IS leader Khaled Ahmed al-Dandal, who had helped five militants escape the Raqqah Detention Facility the week prior.
- 2 September – A suicide bombing targeting Taliban government employees in southern Kabul killed six people and injured 13 others. IS claimed responsibility the following day.
- 6 September – A Pakistani man was arrested near the Canada–United States border for planning a shooting attack at a Jewish center in Brooklyn, New York, in support of IS on the anniversary of the October 7 attacks.
- 12 September – 2024 Qorodal bus shooting: IS militants armed with machine guns opened fire at a bus in central Afghanistan, killing 14 Shiite civilians and injuring six others.
- 14 September – The Turkish National Intelligence Organization announced the arrest of an IS member who planned the 28 January Istanbul church shooting.
- 15 September:
  - A bomb planted by IS in Kuchlak, Pakistan, exploded near a police car, killing two officers and injuring two others.
  - The Syrian Observatory for Human Rights reported that an IS attack between Ithriya and Khanasir killed five Syrian militants with ties to Hezbollah.
- 16 September – A US airstrike on an IS camp in central Syria killed 28 militants, including four senior members. CENTCOM announced the strike on 29 September.
- September 22 – The Islamic State claimed responsibility for an attack on MILF fighters, killing 3 of them in Shariff Aguak, and the killing of a Filipino spy in Ampatuan, southern Philippines.
- September 25 – Islamic State militants launched an ambush on Nigerien forces near the village of Ikniwan in the Tillia area, Tahoua Region, which resulted in the deaths of 30 soldiers, and the injuries of others.
- 27 September – The US announced that it would withdraw troops engaged in the US-led coalition against IS from some bases in Iraq by 2025.

=== October ===
- 1 October – The chief of the United States Africa Command announced that Islamic State – Somalia Province had doubled in size throughout the past year.
- 2 October – IS claims responsibility for an ambush on Iraqi soldiers in Kirkuk, killing 4 soldiers and wounding 4 others.
- 4 October – A Yazidi woman who was kidnapped by IS from northern Iraq and trafficked to the Gaza Strip was freed in an operation involving Israel, the US, and other countries. She was subsequently repatriated to Iraq.
- 5 October – IS claims responsibility for two unrelated attacks in Ituri Province of the Democratic Republic of the Congo, killing 15 and 3 Christians.
- 8 October – An Afghan man was arrested in Oklahoma City for planning an attack on Election Day on behalf of IS.
- 9 October – A man who set bushfires in Melbourne was sentenced to eight years in prison for pledging allegiance to IS in a video in 2021.
- 10 October – 5 Israeli-Arab citizens from Tayibe, Israel, were arrested for a plot to carry out car-bombings at Tel Aviv's Azrieli Mall on behalf of IS.
- 18 October – The Internal Security Department of Singapore announced that it arrested a teenager in August who planned to carry out a stabbing attack against non-Muslims near a community centre in Tampines. He was reportedly radicalized by IS propaganda.
- 20 October – A suspected IS affiliate from Libya was arrested in Bernau for allegedly planning a shooting attack against the Israeli embassy in Berlin.
- 22 October – A joint US-Iraqi raid in the Hamrin Mountains killed eight IS militants, including Jassim al-Mazroui Abu Abdul Qader, the group's leader in Iraq. Two US soldiers were also injured.
- 28 October – US airstrikes on IS camps in central Syria killed 35 militants.

=== November ===
- 4 November – The US announced that 95 operations against IS in Iraq and Syria since 29 August resulted in the deaths of 163 militants and the capture of another 33.
- 6 November – A man was arrested at John F. Kennedy International Airport after planning to depart to Qatar and join IS in Syria.
- 14 November – The FBI announced that it arrested Anas Said in Houston, who allegedly created propaganda for IS and considered carrying out attacks against US soldiers, synagogues, and the Israeli Consulate in Houston.
- 15 November – IS-K claimed responsibility for a shooting that killed Sufi Hameed, the leader of Jamaat-e-Islami in Bajaur District.
- 21 November – A UN agency reported that foreign fighters increased IS–Somalia's size to between 600 and 700 members, doubling the group's membership.
- 22 November – An American-Albanian dual national was arrested in New York over alleged support for IS and distributing instructions on how to make explosives.
- 23 November – Iraqi security forces arrested the emir of IS's Kurdistan faction and six other militants in Kirkuk Province.
- 29 November – An indictment was filed against an Israeli man from Jisr az-Zarqa who pledged allegiance to IS.

=== December ===
- 2 December – The Swedish Prosecution Authority charged three people for the preparation of an IS-linked terrorist crime.
- 8 December:
  - The US announced that it conducted approximately 75 strikes on IS targets in the Syrian Desert aiming to prevent it from taking control of parts of Syria following the fall of the Assad regime.
  - Two Lebanese IS sympathizers and a suspected Turkish accomplice from Mannheim and Hesse respectively were arrested by German authorities for allegedly planning an Islamist attack.
- 10 December – IS militants killed 54 Syrian soldiers fleeing a rebel offensive in Al-Sukhnah, Homs Province.
- 11 December – An IS suicide bombing in Kabul killed seven people, including Taliban refugee minister Khalil Haqqani. Haqqani was the highest ranking Taliban official killed since 2021.
- 16 December – American airstrikes on IS camps and members in Syria killed 12 militants.
- 19 December – Iraqi foreign minister Fuad Hussein warned that IS seized a large amount of abandoned Syrian weapons and is reorganizing its forces.
- 20 December:
  - A man from Springfield, Virginia, was convicted of funding IS after raising over $185,000 in cryptocurrency for the group.
  - An American airstrike in Deir ez-Zor killed two IS militants, including the group's leader in Syria, Abu Yusif.
- 23 December – A suspected IS supporter from Howden was accused of plotting a terrorist attack using mustard gas.
- 29 December – France carried out airstrikes against IS positions in Syria.
- 31 December – Puntland authorities announced that eight militants were killed following IS attacks on security forces in the Dharjale and Bari regions. IS claimed responsibility the following day, claiming that it killed 22 security personnel and injured dozens of others.
