= Battle of Mocímboa da Praia =

2020 conflict in Mozambique

- Part of the Insurgency in Cabo Delgado
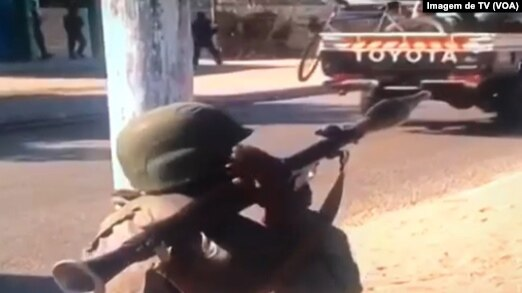
- Insurgent in Mocimboa da Praia during the battle
Date	June 27–29, 2020
Location	Mocimboa da Praia, Cabo Delgado Province, Mozambique
Result	Al-Shabaab captures the city on June 27, Mozambican forces and allies recapture it on June 29

Belligerents
Mozambique; Dyck Advisory Group	Islamic State - Central Africa Province

Commanders and leaders
Horacio Arosio Charles †	Unknown

Casualties and losses
- Unknown, but heavy

On June 27, 2020, jihadists from al-Shabaab raided the city of Mocímboa da Praia in the Cabo Delgado Province of Mozambique. Al-Shabaab fighters attacked the city following brutal crackdowns against civilians by the Mozambican government, and in their attacks, destroyed homes and killed more civilians. A Mozambican counteroffensive aided by South African mercenaries of the Dyck Advisory Group renewed fighting in the city, with the mercenaries being criticized for their indiscriminate shooting of civilians.

== Background ==
Islamist militants aligned with the Islamic State – Central Africa Province (ISCAP) have been waging an insurgency against the Mozambican government in the northern Cabo Delgado Province since 2017. Mozambican government forces launched an offensive against Ahlu Sunna wal Jama'a (ASWJ), the main jihadist group in Cabo Delgado, a few weeks prior to the attack on June 27, and had recaptured the city from the jihadists on June 9.

In the week leading up to the battle, Mozambican forces in Mocimboa da Praia were accused of atrocities that were "so brutal that multiple sources described the attack as a direct response to government violence." In the Nanduadua neighborhood of the town, government forces raped women and arrested men suspected of being insurgents during door-to-door raids on June 25. The local muezzin was injured so badly he couldn't perform calls to prayer the next morning, and many of those arrested were severely injured in custody, with one dying. The bodies of twenty-six people were also discovered on June 26, which residents identified as civilians were arrested the night prior.

Government forces also kidnapped civilians in the villages surrounding Mocimboa da Praia, and cracked down heavily on the press in the city. These crackdowns pushed younger men to join the ranks of the jihadists.

== Battle ==
ASWJ fighters attacked the city around 4am on June 27. The fighters launched the attack from multiple axes, with some engaging in combat with government forces in the south of the town and others raiding government and police buildings in the center of the town. The jihadists used RPGs and a SPG-9 along with an 82mm mortar, the first use of a mortar in the insurgency, although they had been documented in captured ASWJ loot in May. In the initial attack, ASWJ fighters destroyed civilian homes and infrastructure as well, and killed and abducted civilians. As many of the fighters were from Mocimboa da Praia, many of the civilian attacks were the result of personal grievances between the fighters and the victims, although other killings were completely arbitrary. Mozambican forces repelled the initial attack by the jihadists, but were overrun in a second attack. Mozambican forces, when they realized they were being overrun, attempted to blend in with civilians, leading to ASWJ seizing the city unopposed. Some Mozambican soldiers holed up in the town's bank, but were all massacred. Once in control of the town, ASWJ looted the military barracks and district administration building, along with cutting off cell phone service to the town. ASWJ continued to kill civilians when roaming the city after its capture.

Despite being expelled from the town on ground, Mozambican forces and South African mercenaries from the Dyck Advisory Group (DAG) launched a counteroffensive by air. Three helicopters piloted by DAG mercenaries fired directly into Mocimboa da Praia "to flush out the insurgents", while Mozambican forces launched a small ground counteroffensive. A civilian in the town stated that two of the helicopters did not shoot at a group of civilians with their hands up, and another group with some bandits embedded were all shot dead. Another resident stated that DAG helicopters destroyed the town's hospital, as the jihadists were inside thinking that the hospital wouldn't be destroyed. Afterwards, the helicopters "shot against everything and everyone", not discerning between jihadists and civilians. A source close to DAG stated that twelve ASWJ fighters were killed, and one Mozambican soldier was killed and thirteen more were wounded. Another source stated that the Mozambican government's offensive sparked heavy fighting on the afternoon of June 27, but was ultimately unable to dislodge the jihadists. The commander of the Mozambican forces, Horacio Arosio Charles, was killed in the fighting.

== Aftermath ==
Many residents fled the fighting through the mangroves, headed towards the village of Pemba. Others fled by boat to islands such as Muichanga. Boats took refugees from Pemba to other areas north of Cabo Delgado in the days following the battle. When the residents returned, bodies were strewn all throughout the city. In a July 7 interview, Mocimboa da Praia mayor Carlos Momba stated that there was "no infrastructure" in the town. Bodies were still being discovered in the neighborhoods of Muengue and 30 by July, where clashes were heaviest. The jihadists continued to hold a presence in the town, with pro-Islamic State graffiti appearing in July. The lack of infrastructure and ever-present fears of a second battle forced more civilians to flee to Awasse and Mueda.

The Mozambican government claimed the recapture of the city on June 29. DAG helicopters continued to shoot indiscriminately in the town in the days following the battle, and then shot into the forests where many jihadists, civilians, and hostages had fled. One imam taken hostage by ASWJ was killed in the forests by DAG. The war crimes committed by DAG and the indiscriminate firing on civilians was heavily criticized by human rights foundations such as Amnesty International and the Centre for Democracy and Development. The insurgents were present on the main exits and entrances to the city until July 3, kidnapping women from nearby villages. The insurgents launched another offensive on the city in August, capturing it.
