= Diaca =

- Town
- Location within Mozambique
- Coordinates: 11.5358°S 39.9374°E
- Country: Mozambique
- Province: Cabo Delgado
- District: Mocímboa da Praia

Population (2007)
  - Total: 17,356
- Time zone: UTC+02:00 (CAT)

Diaca is a town and administrative post in Mocímboa da Praia District in Cabo Delgado Province, Mozambique.

== History ==
On 21 May 2021 the town was recaptured by Mozambican forces.

== Settlements ==
- Awasse
- Chinda
