= Marere =

- Town
- Location within Mozambique
- Coordinates: 11.65972°S 40.36265°E
- Country: Mozambique
- Province: Cabo Delgado
- District: Mocímboa da Praia
- Administrative post: Mbau
- Time zone: UTC+02:00 (CAT)

Marere is a village in Mocímboa da Praia District in Cabo Delgado Province, Mozambique.

== History ==
On 9 June 2020 government forces launched an attack on insurgent base in Marere forcing them to withdraw north.

On 18 August 2021 government forces recaptured Marere during the 2021 Cabo Delgado offensives.

On 24 May 2025 the village was looted by the insurgents.
