= Mucojo =

Mucojo Portuguese: Mucojo Swahili: Mucojo (موثوجو)
- Town
- Location within Mozambique
- Coordinates: 12°3′55″S 40°28′45″E
- Country: Mozambique
- Province: Cabo Delgado
- District: Macomia
- Elevation: 18 m (59 ft)

Population (2015)
  - Total: 1,683
- Time zone: UTC+02:00 (CAT)

Mucojo is a town in Macomia District in Cabo Delgado Province, Mozambique. It has been the site of the heaviest and worst fighting of the Insurgency in Cabo Delgado.

== History ==
The Mucojo residents have for long been supporters of the FRELIMO and still are.

The town has been the site of the heaviest and bloodiest fighting during the Battle of Mucojo. The Mozambican Army as well as the Rwandan Army have been fighting militants in Mucojo since 2020. The town has switched hands between anti-Islamic militants, Islamic State affiliates, and the Mozambican army, and at times even the locals. The town was finally liberated on 29 October by Mozambican and Rwandan forces.

On 6 September 2022, the Mwani population of Mucojo rebelled and killed the head of the town, a member of the Makonde.

== 2022 Floods ==
During the 2022 Mozambican floods, Mucojo was badly affected and relief groups came to its aid.

== Airfield ==
There is a domestic airfield on the outskirts of the town.
