= Macomia =

- Location within Mozambique
- Country: Mozambique
- Province: Cabo Delgado Province
- District: Macomia District

Population (2012)
  - Total: 35,682
- Time zone: UTC+3 (EAT)

Macomia is a city located in the Cabo Delgado Province in northern Mozambique. It is the seat of the eponymous Macomia District.
