= Mocímboa da Praia offensive =

2020 Islamic State operation during the Insurgency in Cabo Delgado

- Part of the War against the Islamic State, the Insurgency in Cabo Delgado
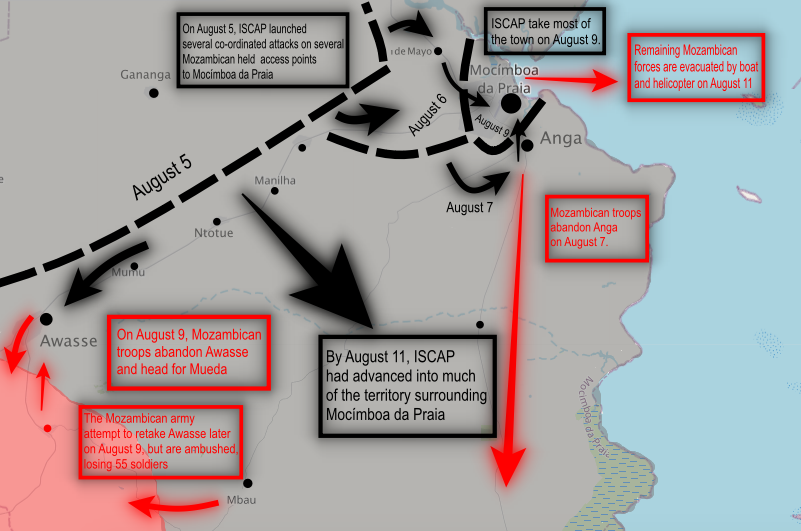
- Day by day map of the offensive. Grey shows ISCAP control and arrows show troop movement. Dotted lines are the frontlines.
Date	5–11 August 2020 (6 days)
Location	Mocímboa da Praia, Mocímboa da Praia District, Mozambique
Result	Islamic State victory

Belligerents
Islamic State	Mozambique

Units involved
Islamic State's Central Africa Province; Al-Shabaab	Mozambique Defence Armed Forces (FADM); Dyck Advisory Group (DAG) mercenaries

Strength
1,000+	Unknown

Casualties and losses
86+ killed	(Mozambique) 110+ killed One HV32 vessel destroyed
- Unknown civilian losses

The Mocímboa da Praia offensive was a six day long offensive in northern Mozambique by Islamic State's Central African Province (IS-CAP) to capture the town of 30,000. The offensive, part of the insurgency in Cabo Delgado, was a major success for IS-CAP, as they captured Mocímboa da Praia.

== Offensive ==
The offensive actions started on August 5, 2020, when IS-CAP insurgents attacked the villages of Anga, 1 de Maio, Awasse, and the outskirts of Mocímboa da Praia on the same night. On August 6, IS-CAP attacked two military bases in Mocímboa da Praia, killing or wounding 50 soldiers and seizing dozens of rifles and RPG-7s. The government also repeated an attempted assault on the city, killing 16 insurgents. On August 8, the government pulled out of Ntotue, a strategic town in between Mocímboa da Praia and Awasse. On August 9, IS-CAP took the town of Awasse and were in control of the outskirts of Mocímboa da Praia. A well-carried out ambush took place on Sunday just before Awasse, killing 55 recruits and injuring 90 more. By the 10th the city of Mocímboa da Praia was completely cut off from food and ammunition. South Africa's Dyck Advisory Group attempted to airdrop ammunition onto the city under siege but dropped it too far from the Mozambican military. As a result, the Mozambicans suffered casualties trying to recover the supplies. On Tuesday, August 11, the Mozambican army, outnumbered and low on ammunition, was forced to retreat by boat from the city. In the retreat, an HV32 interceptor vessel was hit with an RPG and sank. 55 soldiers were killed in running battles during the siege of the city. The insurgents lost a total of 70 men during the battle for the city.

== Aftermath ==
Following the offensive, IS-CAP declared Mocímboa da Praia its capital. Several local civilians welcomed the rebels, and were reportedly seen cheering them on. Despite attempts by the Mozambican security forces to retake the town, it remained under rebel control as of March 2021.

A combination of Rwandan and Mozambican forces launched an effort to retake the city at the beginning of August 2021. This offensive was ultimately successful.

As Mocímboa da Praia has traditionally served as a major hub for smuggling in narcotics and minerals, observers believe that the conquest has allowed IS-CAP to impose taxes which provide it with a steady revenue stream.

== See also ==
- Battle of Palma
- 2021 Cabo Delgado offensives
- 2025 Mocímboa da Praia attacks
