= Mbau, Mozambique =

Mbau
- Town
- Location within Mozambique
- Coordinates: 11.62710°S 40.17700°E
- Country: Mozambique
- Province: Cabo Delgado
- District: Mocímboa da Praia

Population (2007)
  - Total: 11,263
- Time zone: UTC+02:00 (CAT)

Mbau is a town in Mocímboa da Praia District in Cabo Delgado Province, Mozambique.

== History ==
Al-Shabaab with assistance from ISIS had taken control of Mbau during its offensive in Cabo Delgado in August 2020 and has committed numerous atrocities against civilians in the area. Fighting had taken around the town, but Mozambican and Rwandan forces had been repelled from the region.

On 22 August 2021, Mozambican and Rwandan forces confirmed the liberation of the town.

== Settlements ==
- Marere
