= Mocímboa da Praia =

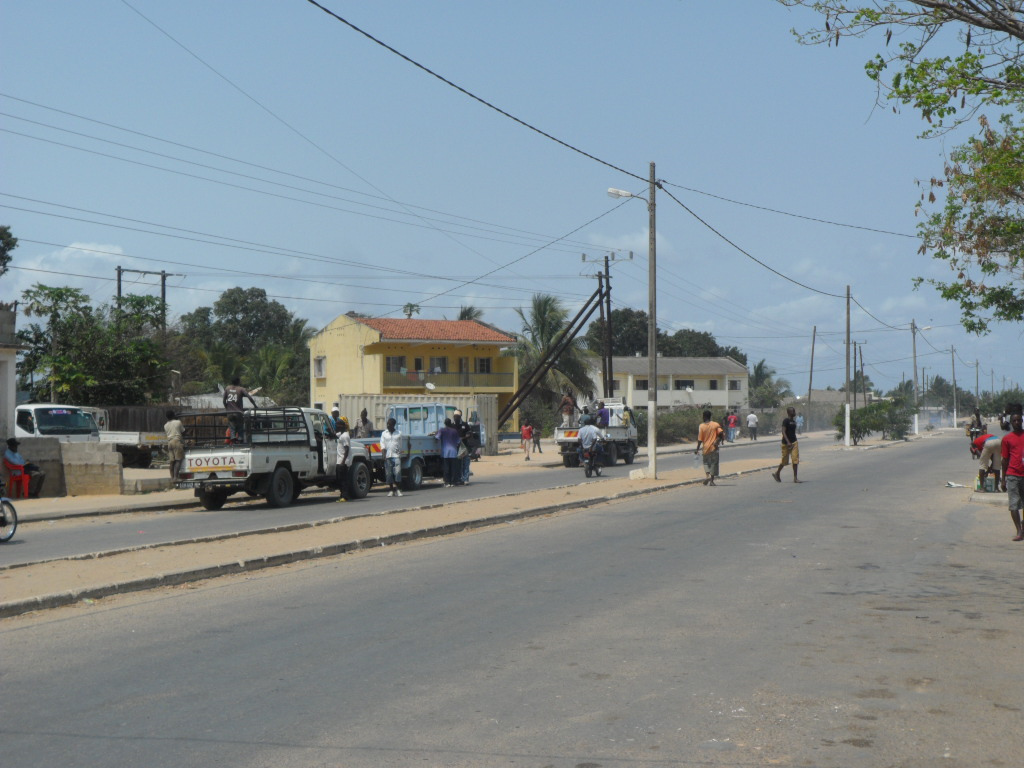

- Location within Mozambique
- Coordinates: 11°21′S 40°20′E
- Country: Mozambique
- Provinces: Cabo Delgado Province

Population (2017)
  - Total: 127,705

Mocímboa da Praia is a port town in northern Mozambique, lying on the Indian Ocean coast, in Cabo Delgado Province. It is used as a border post for travel to and from Tanzania even though it is 127 km from the border by road. It is the seat of Mocímboa da Praia District.

== History ==
The city was prominent during the colonial period due to its port, which served the export market, and because of easy access to Tanzania and the north. The Portuguese army had a base there during the independence struggle. During the Mozambican Civil War it was a safe area for internally displaced people. Many people resettled here after the 1992 peace accords.

In 2017, an Islamic extremist group linked to ISIL named "Ansar al-Sunna" attacked the city during the Insurgency in Cabo Delgado, killing 17 people. Another attack took place on March 24, 2020, which briefly gave the militants control of the city before they were driven out by the Mozambique Defence Armed Forces. Islamist insurgents took control of the city on August 12, 2020, after defending government forces ran short of ammunition and evacuated, some by sea. The insurgents controlled the city for 12 months while the government tried to organise forces to regain control. In August 2021 these efforts were successful and a combination of Rwandan and Mozambican forces retook the city.

== Economy ==
Its economy relies mainly on fishing and logging.

== Demographics ==
Year	Population
2017	127,705
