= Macomia District =

Coordinates: 12.067°S 40.370°E

- District
- District location in Mozambique
- Country: Mozambique
- Province: Cabo Delgado Province
- Capital: Macomia

Area
  - Total: 4,252 km^{2} (1,642 sq mi)

Population (2015)
  - Total: 91,033
  - Density: 21.41/km^{2} (55.45/sq mi)
- Time zone: UTC+3 (EAT)

Macomia District is a district of Cabo Delgado Province in northern Mozambique. It covers 4,252 km² with 91,033 inhabitants.
