= Mocímboa da Praia District =

Coordinates: 11°21′S 40°20′E

Mocímboa da Praia District Wilaya ya Mokimboa da Praia (Swahili)
- District
- District location in Mozambique
- Country: Mozambique
- Province: Cabo Delgado Province
- Capital: Mocímboa da Praia

Area
  - Total: 3,524 km^{2} (1,361 sq mi)

Population (2015)
  - Total: 108,093
  - Density: 30.67/km^{2} (79.44/sq mi)
- Time zone: UTC+3 (EAT)

Mocímboa da Praia District is a district of Cabo Delgado Province in northern Mozambique. The district capital is Mocímboa da Praia town.

== Administrative posts ==
- Mocímboa da Praia
- Mbau
- Diaca
