= Operation Phantom Strike =

2007 military operation

- Part of the Iraq War
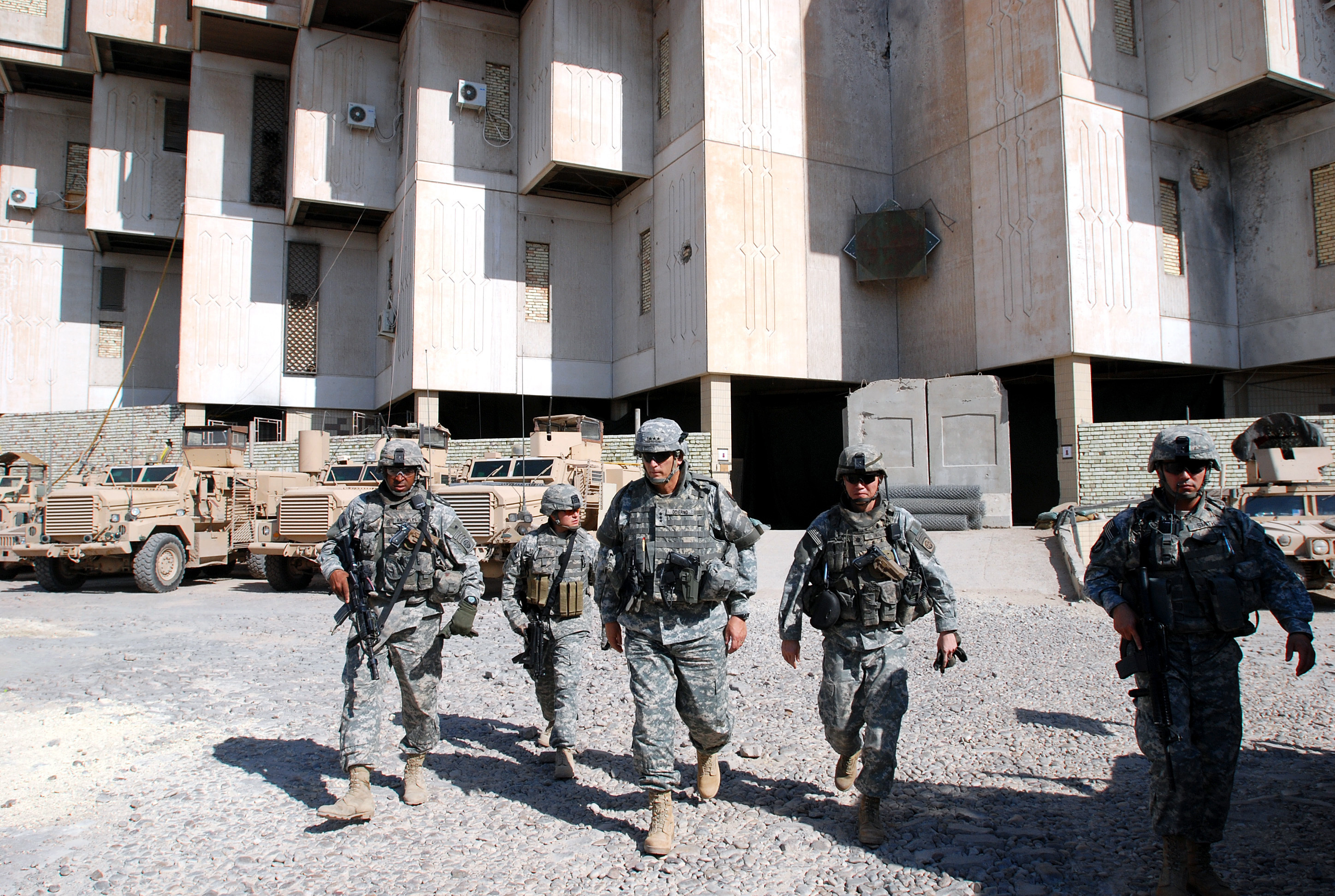
- U.S. Army Command Sgt. Maj. LaMarquis Knowles, Warrant Officer Eric Barreras, Lt. Gen. Ray Odierno, commander of Multi-National Corps – Iraq, and Lt. Col. Richard Kim walk toward the helipad at Combat Outpost Callahan in North Baghdad, Iraq.
Date	15 August 2007 – January 2008
Location	Iraq
Result	Coalition victory

Belligerents
United States; Iraq	Islamic State of Iraq Mahdi Army Other Iraqi insurgents

Commanders and leaders
Abboud Qanbar (United States) David Petraeus	Unknown

Strength
16,000+	Unknown

Casualties and losses
(United States) 11 killed	330+ killed, 83 captured

Operation Phantom Strike was a major offensive launched by the Multi-National Corps – Iraq on 15 August 2007 in a crackdown to disrupt both the al-Qaeda-affiliated Islamic State of Iraq and Shia insurgent operations in Iraq. It consisted of a number of simultaneous operations throughout Iraq focused on pursuing remaining ISI terrorists and Iranian-supported insurgent groups. It was concluded in January 2008 and followed up with Operation Phantom Phoenix.

== Background ==
In mid-October 2006, al-Qaeda announced the creation of Islamic state of Iraq (ISI), replacing the Mujahideen Shura Council (MSC) and its al-Qaeda in Iraq (AQI).

Two major combined Coalition-Iraqi Security Force offensive operations launched in early-to-mid-2007, Operation Imposing Law in Baghdad and Operation Phantom Thunder in the belts surrounding the capital, reduced the effectiveness of extremist groups throughout Iraq, denied insurgents safe havens, support zones and supply lines. A number of significant ISI and Shia insurgent leaders were captured or killed, and large segments of the Iraqi population liberated from ISI intimidation.

The operation was announced by President of the United States George W. Bush on 18 August 2007 in his radio address. In his words,

In recent months, American and Iraqi forces have struck powerful blows against al Qaeda terrorists and violent extremists in Anbar and other provinces. In recent days, our troops and Iraqi allies launched a new offensive called Phantom Strike. In this offensive, we are carrying out targeted operations against terrorists and extremists fleeing Baghdad and other key cities -- to prevent them from returning or setting up new bases of operation. The terrorists remain dangerous and brutal, as we saw this week when they massacred more than 200 innocent Yezidis, a small religious minority in northwestern Iraq. Our hearts go out to the families of those killed, and our troops are going to go after the murderers behind this horrific attack.

== Sub-Operations ==
=== Multi-National Division – North (MND-N) Operations ===
==== Operation Lightning Hammer I & II ====
Began on 15 August 2007 with soldiers from the 3rd Brigade Combat Team, 1st Cavalry Division, partnering with members of the 5th Iraqi Army Division, performed a late-night air assault into targeted locations to capture or kill ISI members responsible for the violence against Iraqi civilians. The operation dubbed Lightning Hammer consisted of approximately 16,000 Iraqi Security and Coalition Forces and was a large-scale offensive to defeat ISI and other terrorist cells seeking safe haven throughout the Diyala River Valley.

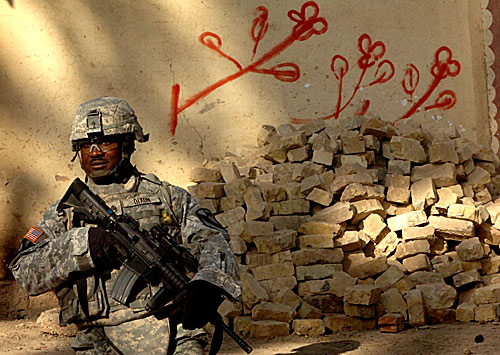
Staff Sgt. Donnie Dixon pulls security while conducting an Operation Lightning Hammer patrol in Mukeisha, Iraq, 14 Aug 2007.

Taking advantage of concentrated forces in Diyala province, Lightning Hammer's goal was to target al-Qaeda elements that fled from Baqouba into the outlying regions north of Diyala's capital city. In addition to the thousands of soldiers and their ISF counterparts participating in Lightning Hammer, attack helicopters, close-air support, Bradley Fighting Vehicles and tanks complement the combined effort.

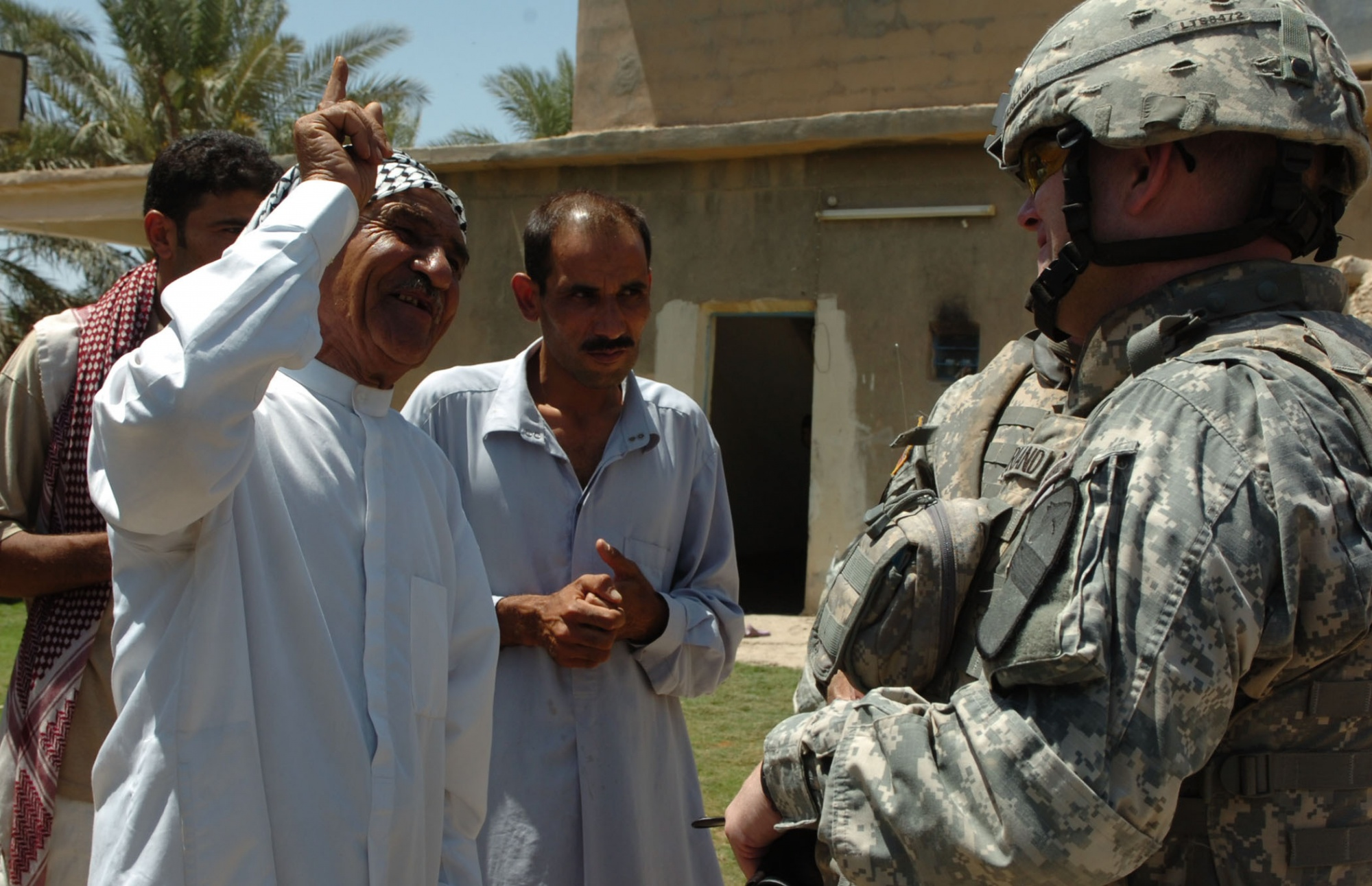
Col. David W. Sutherland, commander of coalition forces in Diyala province, Iraq, speaks with Sheik Sammi, a tribal leader in Sheik Sa'ad Village, to ensure that the local citizens feel secure and are being treated with respect during Operation Lightning Hammer, 14 Aug 2007.

More than 300 artillery munitions, rockets and bombs were dropped throughout the night and into morning, blocking ISI movements and suppressing suspected ISI targets. This barrage set the stage for subsequent nighttime helo-borne and ground assaults into the Diyala River Valley by 5th Squadron, 73rd Cavalry Regiment, and 6-9 Armored Reconnaissance Squadron, respectively. These forces combined with other units already conducting operation Lightning Hammer elsewhere in Diyala and Salah ad Din provinces, totaling approximately 10,000 Coalition Forces and 6,000 Iraqi Security Forces. The 5-73 Soldiers defeated several ineffective small arms attacks, killing three ISI gunmen, detaining eight, and uncovering a weapons cache, numerous IEDs and a booby-trapped house.

In a supporting offensive north of Baqouba, the 5th Iraqi Army Division and 5-20th Infantry Regiment discovered an ISI hideout, complete with bedrolls, believed to house 25 fighters, along with a substantial weapons cache of IED making material, mortars and rocket propelled grenades. The cache was destroyed in place.

Operation Lightning Hammer concluded on 22 August 2007, with the death of 26 insurgents and capturing of 37 others. A follow-up operation called Lightning Hammer II was conducted in early September which killed another 16 insurgents.

==== Operation Iron Hammer & Operation Iron Reaper ====
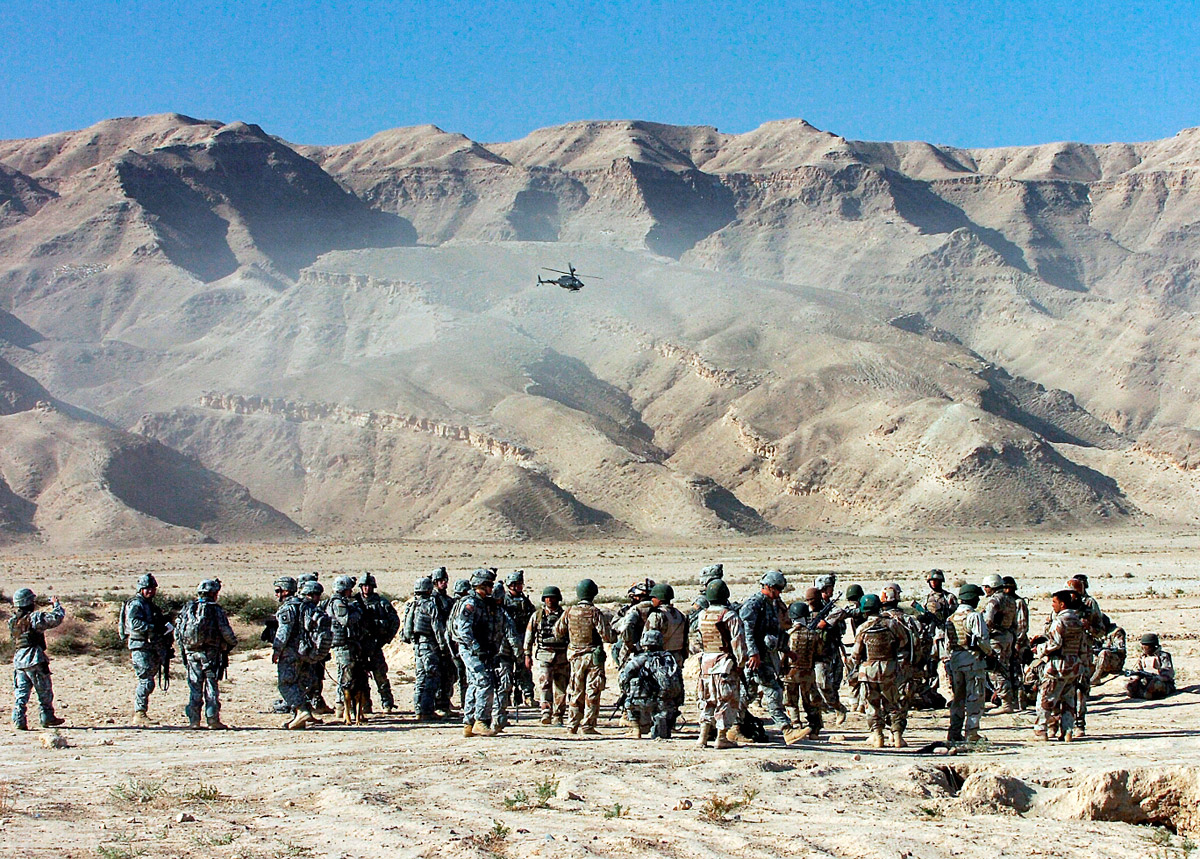
1st Brigade Combat Team, 101st Airborne Division Soldiers, along with Soldiers from the 4th Iraqi Army Division prepare to extract from an objective along the Hamrin Mountain Range during Operation Bulldog Hammer.

Following the transfer of authority for MND-N from the 25th Infantry Division (Task Force Lightning) to the 1st Armored Division (Task Force Iron) in late October 2008, Operation Iron Hammer was launched as a follow-up to Lighting Hammer II in November 2007. The operation was jointly planned by the two commands. The initial focus of the operation was the Za'ab Triangle, a rural area in the Kirkuk province, an Islamic State in Iraq safe haven and a likely location for an insurgent withdrawal from Coalition forces following their defeat in Diyala. The operation ultimately expanded to include all five US brigade combat teams in all four provinces in MND-N's area of operations. All 4 of the Iraqi Army divisions in the area were also involved. 79 arms caches, 29,000 liters of nitric acid, 500 mortar and artillery rounds, and one of the largest EFP caches ever found in Iraq were uncovered during the two-week operation.

Operation Iron Hammer was in turn followed by Operation Iron Reaper on 27 November 2007. Iron Reaper looked to continue to disrupt Islamic State in Iraq elements in northern Iraq. In particular, the Khalis corridor in Diyala, the Za'ab triangle and western Mosul were targeted by 4 of the 5 US brigades, as well as the 2nd, 3rd and 5th divisions of the Iraqi army. As a result of reconciliation efforts made during Iron Hammer, a new Concerned Local Citizens group was also established in Hawijah, southwest of Kirkuk.

==== Multi-National Division – Center (MND-C) Operations ====
===== Operation Marne Husky =====
On 15 August 2007, Operation Marne Husky was launched. It targeted insurgents in the Tigris River Valley who had been forced to withdraw from safe havens in Arab Jabour and Salman Pak by previous operations. The operation involved a series of air assaults across the southern Baghdad Belts because the canals and irrigation in the area limited Coalition mobility. Seven air assaults were launched by soldiers from the 4th BCT/25th Infantry Division and pilots from the 3rd Combat Aviation Brigade of the 3rd Infantry Division. 80 insurgents were captured and 43 killed as a result of this operation, which also saw the first sustainable Concerned Local Citizen movements south of Baghdad. In September 2007, Marne Husky evolved into Operation Marne Torch II.

===== Operation Marne Torch II =====
This operation involved the continued development and support of the Concerned Local Citizen groups by the Coalition forces, particularly the 2nd Heavy Brigade Combat Team (HBCT) of the 3rd Infantry Division. A force of between 700 and 1000 men was raised which enabled the Coalition forces to target Islamic State in Iraq with greater precision. Approximately 250 ISI operatives were killed or captured during the operation, including 6 high-valued targets. Marne Torch II was followed in mid-October by Operation Marne Anvil.

===== Operation Marne Anvil =====
Instead of previous operations which focused on Sunni extremists and ISI, Marne Anvil targeted Shia extremists linked with Muqtada al-Sadr's Jaysh al-Mahdi (JAM) located east of Baghdad. It was succeeded by Operation Marne Courageous in November.

===== Operation Marne Courageous =====
Marne Courageous was launched on 16 November 2007, targeting key ISI supply depots in the Yusufiyah area of the Euphrates River Valley, south east of Baghdad. It began with a major air assault conducted by 450 soldiers of the 3BCT/101st Airborne Division, 150 Iraqi soldiers and 70 Concerned Local Citizens near the villages of Owesat and al-Betra. Marne Courageous was followed by Operation Marne Roundup on 15 December 2007.

===== Operation Marne Roundup =====
The focus of this operation was Iskandariyah, Babil province. On the first day of the operation, Coalition forces uncovered and destroyed a large tunnel network used by ISI to hide weapons and fighters along the banks of the Euphrates River. A large cache was turned over to coalition forces by a Concerned Local Citizen group on the same day.

Operation Marne Roundup concluded at the beginning of January 2008 with the launch of Operation Marne Thunderbolt, part of the new corps-level Operation Phantom Phoenix.

=== Units ===
==== United States and Coalition Units ====
- 3rd Brigade Combat Team, 1st Cavalry Division
- elements of 4th Brigade, 25th Infantry Division
- elements of 3rd Brigade, 82nd Airborne Division
- elements of 3rd Brigade, 2nd Infantry Division
- elements of 4th Brigade, 2nd Infantry Division
- elements of 25th Combat Aviation Brigade
- 5th Squadron, 73rd Cavalry Regiment
- 6-9 Armored Reconnaissance Squadron
- 5-20th Infantry Regiment
- 5th Mobile Public Affairs Detachment
- 115th Mobile Public Affairs Detachment Oregon Army National Guard

==== Iraqi Units ====
- Iraqi Security forces
- Elements of the 4th and 5th Iraqi Army Divisions
- Iraqi Police units from Diyala province
- 5th Division, Iraqi Army

== See also ==
- Iraq War troop surge of 2007
- Operation Together Forward (Unsuccessful attempt to secure Baghdad in 2006)
- Operation Fardh al-Qanoon (Also known as Operation Imposing Law or Baghdad Security Plan)
- Operation Phantom Thunder (Previous nationwide offensive (June–August 2007))
  - Operation Arrowhead Ripper
  - Operation Commando Eagle
  - Operation Marne Torch
- Operation Phantom Phoenix (Follow-up offensive (8 January – 28 July 2008))
- List of coalition military operations of the Iraq War
- Units under General Petraeus' command
