= Operation Phantom Phoenix =

2008 military operation

- Part of the Iraq War, Iraqi insurgency, and the Iraqi civil war
Date	8 January 2008 – 28 July 2008
Location	North-central Iraq
Result	Partial Coalition victory: Coalition victory in Diyala and Salah ad-Din provinces; Indecisive outcome in Mosul and Kirkuk provinces

Belligerents
United States; Iraq (Georgia (country)) Georgia; United Kingdom	Islamic state of Iraq; Other Iraqi Insurgents

Commanders and leaders
(United States) David Petraeus (United Kingdom) Gordon Brown (Iraq) Babaker Shawkat Zebari (Georgia (country)) Davit Kezerashvili	Ayyub al-Masri; Abdul Basit al-Nissani †

Strength
United States: 24,000; Iraqi Security Forces: 130,000; Sons of Iraq: 14,000	Unknown

Casualties and losses
(United States) 59 killed 568 security forces killed 2 missing 7 captured 208 Sons of Iraq killed 4 captured (Georgia (country)) 3 killed (United Kingdom) 1 killed	890 killed, 2,500+ captured

Operation Phantom Phoenix was a major nationwide offensive launched by the Multinational Force Iraq (MNF-I) on 8 January 2008 in an attempt to build on the success of the two previous corps-level operations, Operation Phantom Thunder and Operation Phantom Strike and further reduce violence and secure Iraq's population, particularly in the capital Baghdad. The offensive consisted of a number of joint Coalition and Iraqi Army operations throughout northern Iraq as well as in the southern Baghdad Belts.

The northern operation was designated Operation Iron Harvest. Its objective was to hunt down the remaining 200 Al-Qaeda extremists remaining in the province of Diyala following the end of the previous offensive. The operation also included targeting insurgent elements in Salah ad-Din province and Nineveh province. The southern operation was designated Operation Marne Thunderbolt and targeted insurgent safe havens in the belts to the south-east of Baghdad, particularly the Arab Jabour region.

Additionally, Phantom Phoenix's aims were the remaining car, truck and suicide bomb networks in Baghdad as well as al-Qaeda's financial network.

== Background ==
In mid-October 2006, al-Qaeda announced the creation of Islamic state of Iraq (ISI), replacing the Mujahideen Shura Council (MSC) and its al-Qaeda in Iraq (AQI).

According to Lt General Raymond Odierno, the goal of the operation was to provide security for the nine major cities in Iraq, with an emphasis on securing Baghdad. The operation built on the previous two major operations, Operation Phantom Thunder and Operation Phantom Strike, which were launched at the conclusion of the US troop build-up in June 2007, in order to eliminate insurgent safe havens throughout the Baghdad Belts and secure the population of Baghdad.

"Working closely with the Iraqi Security Forces, we will continue to pursue al-Qaeda and other extremists wherever they attempt to take sanctuary. [Phantom Phoenix] will synchronize lethal and non-lethal effects to exploit recent security gains and disrupt terrorist support zones and enemy command and control...[The operation will include] a series of joint Iraqi and Coalition division and brigade level operations to pursue and neutralize remaining al-Qaeda in Iraq and other extremists. [In addition], the non-lethal aspects of this operation are designed to improve delivery of essential services, economic development and local governance capacity".

— Lt General Raymond Odierno, Commanding General, Multi-National Corps-Iraq

=== Coalition military units involved ===
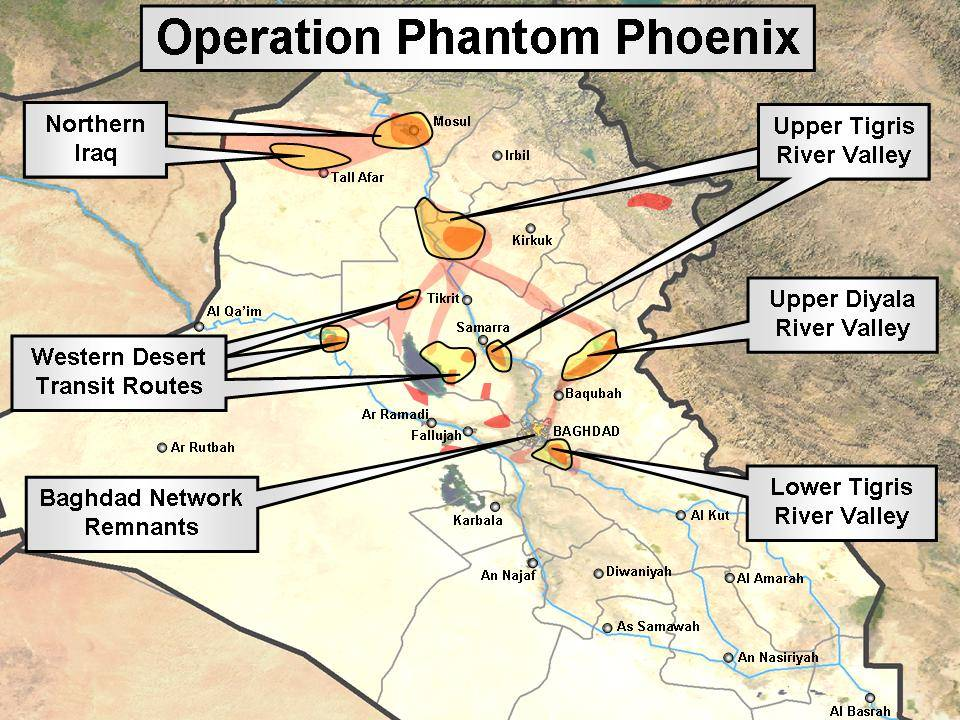
MNF-I chart showing the focus of Operation Phantom Phoenix

==== Multi-National Division-North ====
- 4th Stryker Brigade Combat Team (BCT), 2nd Infantry Division – Diyala province.
- 3rd Armored Cavalry Regiment – Nineveh province.
- 1st BCT, 10th Mountain Division – Kirkuk area
- 1st BCT, 101st Airborne Division – Salah ad-Din province.

==== Multi-National Division-Center ====
- 3rd Infantry Division – southern Baghdad Belts.
  - 2nd BCT, 3rd Infantry Division
  - 3rd HBCT, 3rd Infantry Division
  - 3rd Aviation Brigade
- 3rd BCT, 101st Airborne Division
- 214th Fires Brigade

== Operation timeline ==
=== Diyala and Salah ad-Din operations ===
On 8 January 2008, Multi-National Division-North (MND-N) launched Operation Iron Harvest against Al Qaida in Iraq elements in the Diyala province with operations concentrated on Muqdadiyah. Following up on Operation Iron Reaper launched in November 2007, Iron Harvest consisted of two sub-operations: Operation Raider Harvest, carried out by the 4th BCT of the 2nd Infantry Division in Diyala province; and Operation Warrior Harvest, carried out by the 1st BCT of the 10th Mountain Division in Kirkuk province (formerly At-Ta'mim province). During the first month of the operation, a contingent of US Marines supported the 4th BCT of the 2nd Infantry Division (Operation Raider Harvest). They were requested from MNF-W to provide support with MRAPs and ground forces. They assisted in conducting cordon-raids, convoy operations, patrols, and worked with US Army Special Forces.

In the lead up to the operation an information blackout aimed at most of the MNF-I's New Iraqi Army comrades was implemented—it has been reported that the Iraqi army had previously used unencrypted forms of communications including regular cellphones and radio.

Following the communications blackout, American troops began a major offensive to drive Sunni insurgents from strongholds in the Diyala and Salah ad-Din provinces. Despite the preemptive measures, insurgents are believed to have gained prior knowledge of the operation plans and pulled out before the Americans arrived. It has been speculated by MNF-I commanders that militants may have been tipped off by communications leaks or by the visible movements of troops and machinery preceding the operation. However, some insurgents remained in the province to engage the coalition troops in a possible attempt to delay further advances.

Seven American battalions, accompanied by Iraqi Army units, advanced into a 110-square-mile (280 km^{2}) area in the northern Diyala River valley. Decoy operations were attempted in Baqubah and Wajihiya to the south to mislead the insurgents however advance units noticed an unusual number of women and children fleeing south in cars in the days before the operation. Insurgent fighters left the villages days before, but some remained behind or returned to plant car bombs.

During fighting in Diyala over the course of 24 hours up to 24 insurgents were killed and ten captured. In Salah ad-Din at the same time three US soldiers were killed and two wounded after their vehicle hit an IED.

On the second day of the operation American troops involved in the operation suffered further casualties. Six soldiers were killed and four wounded in a blast as their patrol investigated a house which was rigged with explosives.

Fighting continued near Muqdadiyah on day three of the offensive. Eight insurgents were killed in Muqdadiyah and another two insurgents were killed elsewhere in Diyala.

On day 7, 15 insurgents were killed when heavy fighting erupted in Buhriz, a small village south of Baquba. During house searches by Iraqi Police, three Iraqi policemen and two Awakening Council militiamen were killed when the house they were searching blew up because of booby traps laid by militants. Another two policemen were missing. Another Awakening Council militiaman was killed in fighting on the outskirts of town.

On day 10, an IED killed three US soldiers in Salah ad-Din and wounded two.

On day 12, Coalition and Iraqi Army forces reported 121 militants killed, and 1,023 suspected militants captured so far. Also, on the same day there was an attempted attack on the governor of Diyala province. Three security personnel were killed and two wounded when a bomb exploded at his residence.

By day 16, Coalition troops cleared a key route between Baghdad and Baqubah of improvised explosive devices. The area of the road between Khan Bani Sa'ad and Baqubah had been so heavily covered in IEDs that vehicles had to take other routes to get back and forth from Baghdad and Baqubah. It was also confirmed that 41 of all the insurgents killed in Diyala by then during the operation were al-Qaeda in Iraq operatives.

On day 19, Iraqi Security Forces, advised by US Special Forces, detained an extremist leader and a terrorist financier in separate operations in Safwan, Iraq. Iraqi and US forces also detained the leader of an extremist group believed to be responsible for mortar and explosive projectile attacks against Iraqi and Coalition Forces.

By 10 February 2008 Coalition forces and Iraqi Security Forces had conducted 74 different operations at the company level and above as part of Iron Harvest. Seventy high-value individuals were captured or killed, in addition to hundreds of other lower-level enemy fighters. 430 weapons caches, 653 IEDs, 42 HBIEDs, 35 VBIEDs, and 3 VBIED factories were all found and cleared.

On day 42, Iraqi army and police forces backed by US aircraft and fighters from local anti-Al-Qaida Awakening Council group carried out a raid at dawn on insurgent hideouts on the open areas near Lake Tharthar, 120 km north of Baghdad in Salah ad-Din province, on Saturday, killing 10 suspected insurgents, including a local leader, and capturing 4 others, a provincial police officer said. Abdul Basit al-Nissani, a local leader of the al-Qaida in Iraq network, blew himself up after he was surrounded by the security forces while crossing a small river, he said.

On 25 March, UK SAS troops conducted a raid on a bomb-making team that left one UK soldier dead along with two insurgents and nine civilians, including women and children. Four British soldiers were wounded.

On 13 April Coalition forces from MND-N discovered a mass grave south of Muqdadiyah. The grave contained between 20 and 30 bodies which are estimated to have been buried for nearly eight months.

On 15 April, in Baquba as many as 36 people were killed and at least 66 more were wounded during a car bombing near the courthouse. The VBIED (vehicle borne improvised explosive device) was determined to have contained over 1,000 pounds of home-made explosives (HME).

On 17 April, near Tuz Khormato in the village of al-Bu Mohammed, at least 50 people were killed and 55 more were wounded when a suicide bomber blew up his explosives at a funeral for two US-allied Awakening Council militia members killed a day earlier. The older bomber was dressed in traditional garb and allowed to enter the funeral freely.

=== Fighting in Ninawa and Kirkuk ===
As part of Operation Phantom Phoenix, security operations were conducted against Al-Qaeda's last major urban stronghold in the city of Mosul. An offensive was started in late January. A day after Iraqi reinforcements began arriving in the region, five US soldiers were killed when an American patrol was ambushed in the city.

The offensive also included operations in the cities of Tal Afar and Kirkuk, also major urban centers in the north of the country. Operations were also conducted in the north-western Jazeera Desert between Mosul and the Syrian border, focusing on the towns of Baji and Sinjar.

By late April, Coalition Forces had made small gains in the north and intelligence reports suggested that Al-Qaeda was regrouping and infiltrating squads of suicide bombers into Baghdad from the north.

In mid-May, a major Iraqi military operation codenamed Operation Lion's Roar (later renamed to Operation Mother of Two Springs) was conducted in Mosul which resulted in the capture of 1,480 insurgents, 300 of them wanted suspects. The operation ended by late May and with it the Ninawa and Kirkuk provinces were declared secured by the Iraqi Army. However, in early June remnant insurgent forces conducted a string of suicide bombings in the north leaving dozens of people dead, many of them members of the security forces. The US military also came under attack in the Hawija area, south of Kirkuk, leaving four soldiers dead and 20 more wounded in two separate attacks within a four-day period. By late that month it was reported that all security gains made by the security forces during operation Lion's Roar had disintegrated. Insurgents managed to re-enter the city and gunmen were seen roaming the streets in force.

=== Southern Iraq ===
On 8 January, Operation Marne Thunderbolt was launched by Multi-National Center (MND-C) and was the largest operation carried out by the 3rd Infantry Division to date. Its objective was to eliminate al Qaida in Iraq safe havens in Arab Jabour. The operation was spearheaded by the 5th squadron of the 7th Cavalry regiment. It is notable for the unusual amount of air power used during the operation.

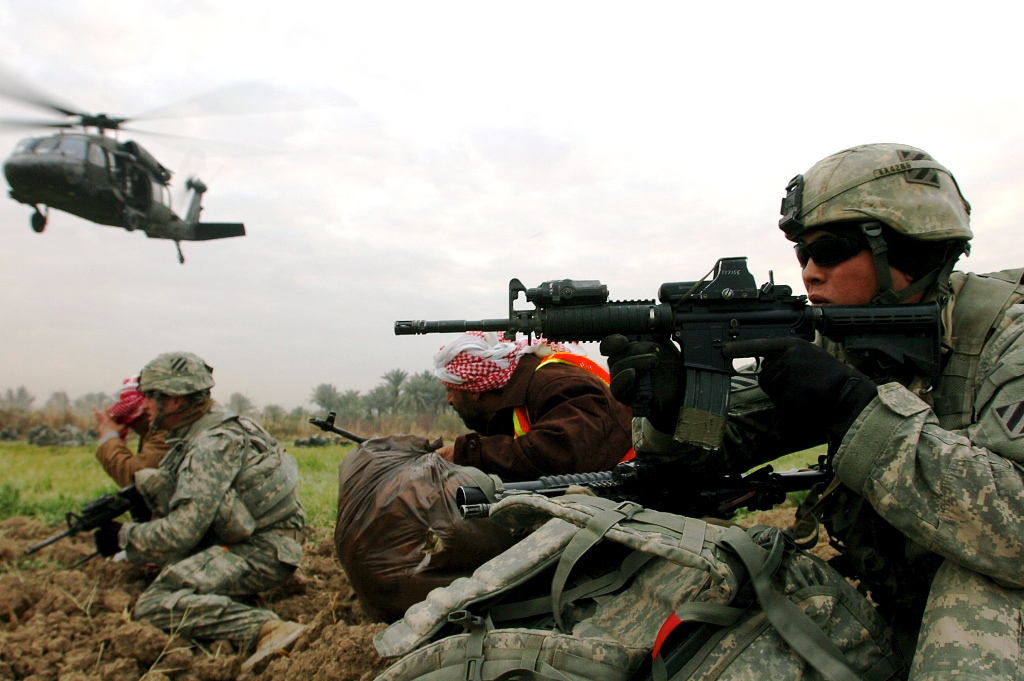
US soldiers and Sunni Arab tribesmen scan for enemy activity in a farm field in southern Arab Jabour, following an air assault as part of Operation Browning, 20 January 2008

On day three of the offensive two B-1 bombers and four F-16 fighters carried out massive air-strikes on Arab Jabour, a Sunni district on the southern outskirts of Baghdad. Arab Jabour, a mainly rural district, was one of a few areas of Baghdad that remained under the control of insurgents after Operation Law and Order the previous year. The planes dropped 47 bombs on targets in Arab Jabour in ten separate strikes. The entire raid lasted for ten minutes and the total tonnage of the bombs was 40,000 pounds (18,100 kg). The 40 targets hit in the huge barrage of air-strikes consisted mainly of large weapons caches, explosives, tunnels and powerful roadside bombs buried deep underground – key defensive elements for Al Qaeda in Iraq insurgents reported Army Col. Terry Ferrell. After the raids ground operations followed up and 12 suspected insurgents were captured near Arab Jabour.

On day 14, US warplanes pounded suspected Al-Qaeda havens and weapons caches in Arab Jabour for the third time since the operation began, hitting more than 30 targets in a 35-bomb blitz, the military said. The mainly Sunni Arab Jabour rural area was hit with bombs weighing a total of 19,000 pounds (9,000 kilograms) during the air raids, which aimed to destroy roadside bombs arms caches, and Al-Qaeda havens a military statement said. The raid follows two previous air strikes in the same area on 10 and 16 January. A total of nearly 100 targets were hit with a combined weight of 98,000 pounds of bombs during the three air strikes.

On 15 February 2008, MND-C transitioned from Marne Thunderbolt to Marne Grand Slam. During the initial phase of the operation, the 3rd BCT of the 3rd Infantry Division established a new Combat Outpost in Salman Pak, an area that was a stronghold of the Republican Guard before the war. Coalition forces also established a government center in the area and introduced hundreds of thousands of dollars in micro-grants to rebuild local markets.

On 15 March, the Iraqi Army, with support from a US Military transition team from the 3rd Infantry Division, launched Operation Marne Rugged in the Tigris River valley southeast of the Arab Jabour and Salman Pak regions. The goal of the operation was to secure the approaches to MND-C's area of operations, particularly to control river crossings given the poor condition of bridges and canals in the area.

On 10 April, Iraqi Army soldiers discovered 33 bodies in a mass grave in Mahmudiyah. It was the first such discovery of a mass grave in MND-C's area of operations since it was established as part of the "surge" in 2007.

=== Operation ends ===
Combat operations continued until late July. Heavy casualties were sustained on both sides. Although the Coalition military suffered just over 60 dead, the Iraqi security forces and the Awakening Councils forces suffered more than 770 dead and more than a dozen missing or captured. The insurgents suffered almost 900 dead and more than 2,500 were captured. Diyala province had been almost entirely cleared of insurgent forces. On 29 July, the Iraqi security forces started their own offensive in Diyala province and stated the operation would last for two weeks and will result in the final establishing of law and order in the province. However, in the north the situation was totally different. After Coalition operations initially beat back the insurgents in the northern Ninawa and Kirkuk provinces the rebels came back and heavy fighting was still going on for the north by the end of operation Phantom Phoenix with the security forces still not being able to overcome the last insurgent stronghold in the north, Mosul.

== See also ==
- Operation Phantom Thunder
- Operation Phantom Strike
- Iraq Spring Fighting of 2008
- Ninawa campaign
- Diyala campaign
