= Operation Phantom Thunder =

2007 military operation in Iraq

- Part of the Iraq War
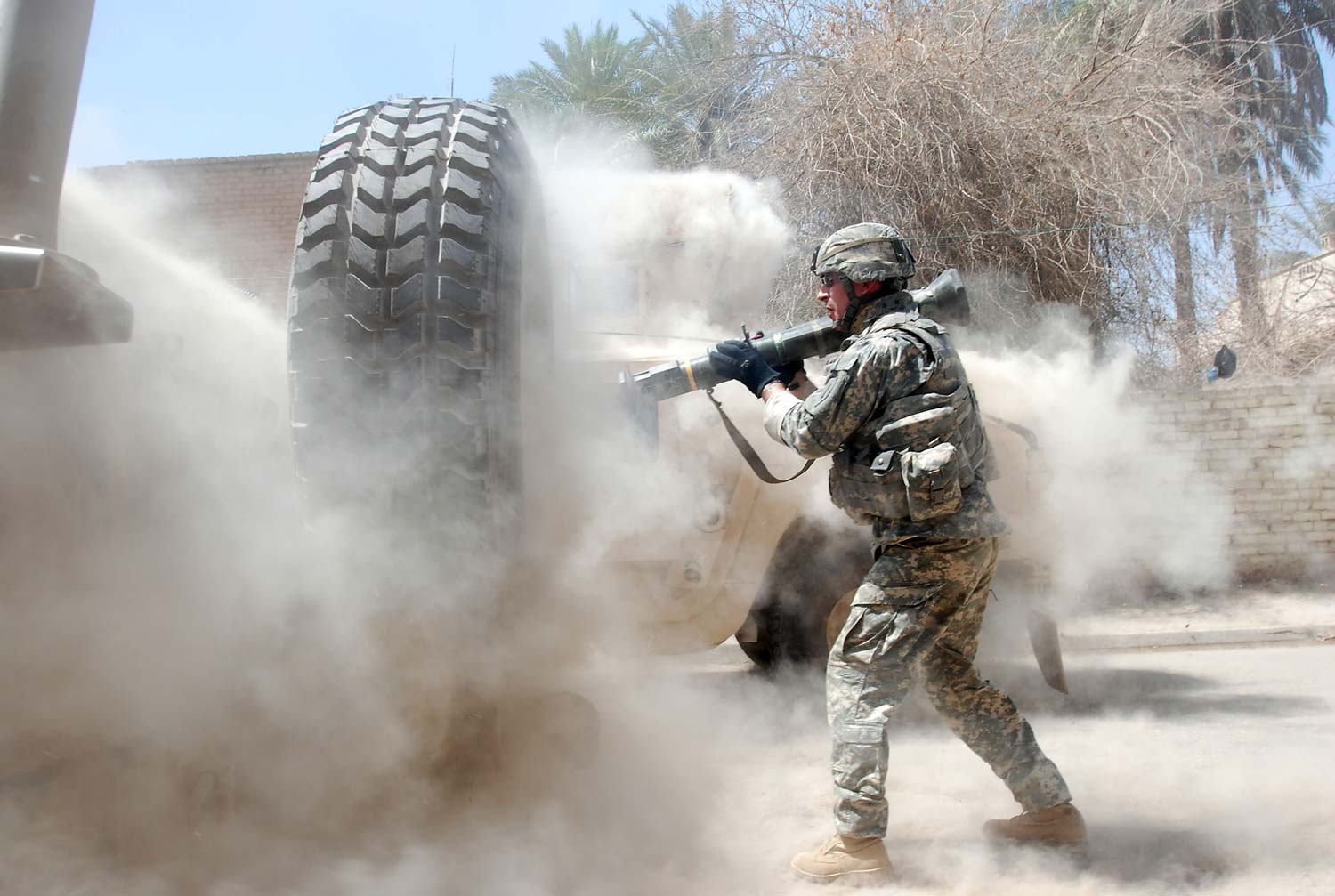
- An American soldier fires an AT4 in the Adhamiyah neighborhood.
Date	16 June 2007 – 14 August 2007
Location	Iraq
Result	Allied victory (Large territories previously held by insurgents come under coalition control; Operations continue with operation Phantom Strike)

Belligerents
United States (Iraq) Iraqi Army (Iraq) Revolution Brigade (Iraq) Awakening Movement	Islamic State of Iraq Mahdi Army Other Iraqi insurgents

Commanders and leaders
(United States) David Petraeus (United States) Raymond Odierno	Abu Omar al-Baghdadi; Abu Ayyub al-Masri

Strength
~28,000 U.S./Iraqi Forces	Unknown

Casualties and losses
(Iraq) 220 security forces killed (Iraq) 20 militia killed 140 killed 1 OH-58 Kiowa and 1 AH-64 Apache shot down	1,196 killed (46 bombers), 6,702 captured, 51 boats destroyed, 1,113 weapons caches destroyed, 382 high value individuals captured or killed, 2,299 IEDs cleared, 52 VBIEDS neutralized, 142 total Battalion-level Joint Operations

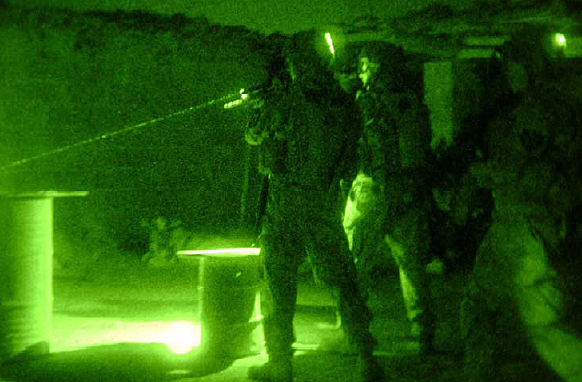
Stryker soldiers assigned to 4th Battalion, 9th Infantry Regiment, prepare to enter a mud stall during the clearing of a village in the outskirts of Baqouba, Iraq, 19 June 2007.

Operation Phantom Thunder began on 16 June 2007, when Multi-National Force-Iraq launched major offensive operations against al-Qaeda and other extremist terrorists operating throughout Iraq. It was the largest coordinated military operation since the 2003 invasion of Iraq. Operation Phantom Thunder was a corps level operation, including Operation Arrowhead Ripper in Diyala Province, Operation Marne Torch and Operation Commando Eagle in Babil Province, Operation Fardh al-Qanoon in Baghdad, Operation Alljah in Anbar Province, and continuing special forces actions against the Mahdi Army in southern Iraq and against Al-Qaeda leadership throughout the country. The operation was one of the biggest military operations in Iraq since the U.S. invasion in 2003.

== Background ==
In mid-October 2006, al-Qaeda announced the creation of Islamic state of Iraq (ISI), replacing the Mujahideen Shura Council (MSC) and its al-Qaeda in Iraq (AQI).

From January to June 2007, in conjunction with the U.S. military's troop surge strategy, an additional five U.S. brigades were deployed to Iraq, with their primary focus on the Baghdad Belts—a series of key areas surrounding the Iraqi capital. This deployment was a critical part of the preparation for Operation Phantom Thunder, a major offensive aimed at stabilizing Baghdad and its surrounding regions by targeting insurgent strongholds.

During this period, U.S. forces engaged in a series of "shaping" operations designed to create favorable conditions for the larger offensive. These operations involved disrupting enemy movements, securing key terrain, and gathering intelligence, all of which were essential to the success of the upcoming main assault.

On 14 June 2007, the Diyala Operational Command was established. This new Iraqi corps-level command structure significantly enhanced coordination among Iraqi security forces across the Diyala province, a region that was a focal point of insurgent activity. The establishment of this command was a pivotal step in enabling the integration of Iraqi and coalition forces, thereby improving the effectiveness of the broader counterinsurgency efforts during Operation Phantom Thunder. This operation marked a significant escalation in coalition and Iraqi efforts to regain control of insurgent-dominated areas and restore stability to Iraq during a critical phase of the conflict.

== The Operation ==
U.S. and Iraqi forces launched attacks on Baghdad's northern and southern flanks mid-June to clear out Sunni insurgents, al-Qaida fighters and Shiite militiamen who had fled the capital and Anbar during the four-month-old security operation. The U.S. wanted to take advantage of the arrival of the final brigade of 30,000 additional U.S. troops to open the concerted attacks.

=== Operation "Imposing Law" ===
Operation Imposing Law had already begun on 14 February in an attempt to take back Baghdad which had come more than 70 percent under insurgent control. It became part of Phantom Thunder when that operation started and during the period of Phantom Thunder 311 insurgents, including 26 bombers, were killed in fighting in Baghdad.

=== Operation "Marne Torch" ===
Operation Marne Torch began on 16 June in the Arab Jabour and Salman Pak area, conducted by the new Multinational Division Central. Arab Jabour, being only 20 kilometers southeast from Baghdad, is a major transit point for insurgent forces in and out of Baghdad. By 14 August, 2,500 Coalition and Iraqi forces had detained more than five dozen suspected extremists, destroyed 51 boats, killed 88 terrorists and discovered and destroyed 51 weapons caches.

=== Operation "Arrowhead Ripper" ===
Operation Arrowhead Ripper began on 18 June, when Multi-National Division-North commenced offensive operations against Al-Qaeda positions in Baquba in Diyala province where fighting had already been going on for months. The operation started with air assaults under the cover of darkness in Baquba. Heavy street fighting lasted throughout the first day of the operation, mainly in the center of the city and around the main city market. On 22 June, Coalition attack helicopters killed 17 al-Qaeda gunmen and the vehicle they were using southwest of Khalis in Diyala province. By 19 August, at least 227 insurgents had been killed in Baquba.

=== Operation "Commando Eagle" ===
Operation Commando Eagle began on 21 June in the Mahmudiyah region southwest of Baghdad, conducted by Multinational Division Central. This region contains the notorious Triangle of Death and was the location where three US soldiers were kidnapped in mid-May 2007. The operation resulted in 31 detainees and the seizure of multiple large weapons caches. The operation was described as "a mix of helicopter borne air assaults and Humvee-mounted movements."

=== Operation "Alljah" ===
Operation Alljah was conducted by Multi-National Forces West. In the western Al Anbar province operations attacked insurgent supply lines and weapons caches, targeting the regions of Fallujah, Karma and Tharthar. Commanders of the operation expressed belief that Fallujah would be cleared by August and that the regions of Karma and Tharthar would be cleared by July. On 17 June, a raid near Karma killed a known Libyan Al-Qaeda fighter and six of his aides and on 21 June six al-Qaeda members were killed and five were detained during early-morning raids also near Karma. On 23 June, a U.S. airstrike killed five suspects and destroyed their car bomb near Fallujah. Insurgents also struck back in Fallujah with two suicide bombings and an attack on an off-duty policeman that left four policemen dead on 22 June. On 29 June, U.S. forces killed a senior al-Qaeda leader east of Fallujah. Abu 'Abd al-Rahman al-Masri, an Egyptian, was a veteran who served in both battles of Fallujah. On 6 July, a raid west of Fallujah resulted in the killing of an Al-Qaeda in Iraq battalion commander and two of his men and the captured of two more insurgents.

=== Actions taken against the Mahdi Army ===
On 21 June, a joint Iraqi-American operation commenced near Hilla to capture or kill members of Moktada al-Sadr's Mahdi Army. Iraqi Special Forces raided Sadr City and captured a "key insurgent leader" on 20 June, along with two associates.

=== Additional operations ===
Numerous smaller operations had also been conducted against insurgents, which included attacks on retreating insurgent forces from Baquba in the town of Khalis and other insurgents targets throughout Diyala province. In the fighting in Diyala province, an additional 234 insurgents were killed by 14 August beside those killed in operation Arrowhead Ripper, mainly in clashes in and around the town of Khalis. The fiercest of the clashes happened when the U.S.-allied insurgent group 1920th revolution brigade and Al-Qaeda fought a battle at Shrween village in Muqdadiya on 4 July killing 20 members of Al-Qaeda in Iraq.

== Operation conclusion ==
On 14 August, it was announced that the operation ended. Coalition and Iraqi security forces pushed into areas previously not under their control, and they also ejected insurgent groups from their strongholds in Northern Babil, eastern Anbar and Diyala provinces and on the southern outskirts of Baghdad. During the operation, Iraqi and Coalition forces conducted intelligence raids against al Qaeda in Iraq and the Iranian-backed cells nationwide, with a heavy emphasis on cells in Baghdad, Diyala, and central and northern Iraq. Operation Arrowhead Ripper continued for another five days until 19 August with more intense street fighting in Baquba. The operations continued into operation Phantom Strike.

== Military units involved ==
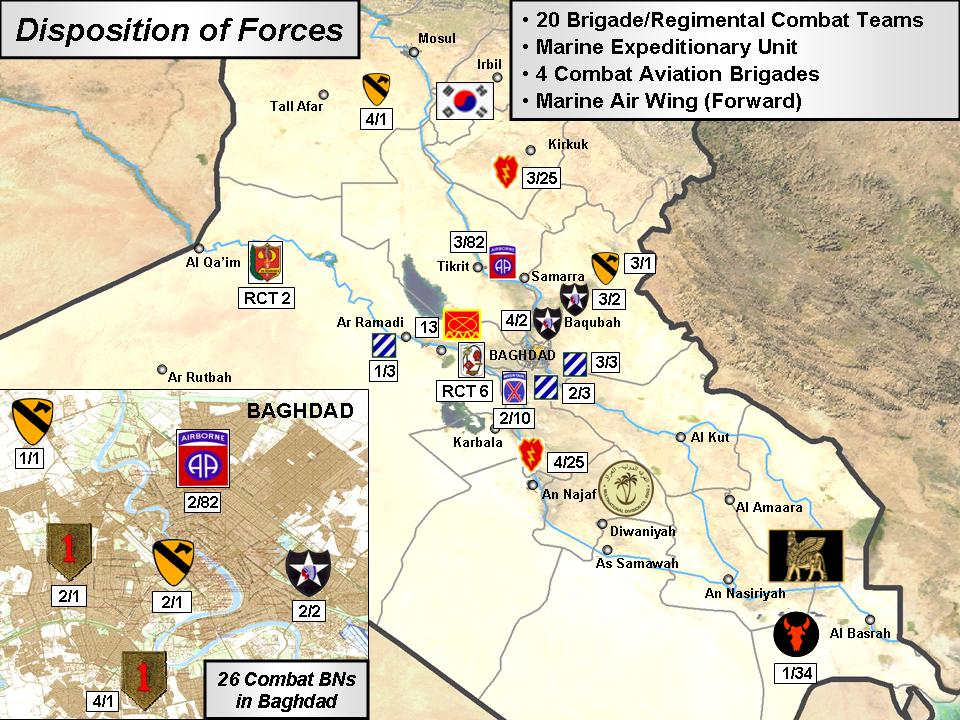
MNF-I map showing disposition of Coalition forces prior to the launch of Operation Phantom Thunder.

US forces reported to be involved were

- 3rd Stryker Brigade Combat Team, 2nd Infantry Division
- 4th Stryker Brigade Combat Team, 2nd Infantry Division
- 3rd Brigade Combat Team, 1st Cavalry Division
- 2nd Brigade Combat Team, 3rd Infantry Division
- 3rd Brigade Combat Team, 3rd Infantry Division
- 4th Brigade Combat Team, 25th Infantry Division
- 25th Combat Aviation Brigade
- 2nd Brigade Combat Team, 10th Mountain Division
- 13th Marine Expeditionary Unit
- Regimental Combat Team 2
- Regimental Combat Team 6
- Task Force 88

Iraqi forces reported to be involved were

- 1st Division
- 4th Division
- 5th Division
- 1st Iraqi National Police Mechanized Brigade

== See also ==
- Iraq War troop surge of 2007
- Operation Fardh al-Qanoon
- Operation Marne Torch
- Operation Arrowhead Ripper
- Operation Commando Eagle
- Operation Phantom Strike
- Operation Phantom Phoenix
- Coalition military operations of the Iraq War
