= Operation Alljah =

2007 military operation in Iraq

- Part of the Iraq War (Operation Phantom Thunder)
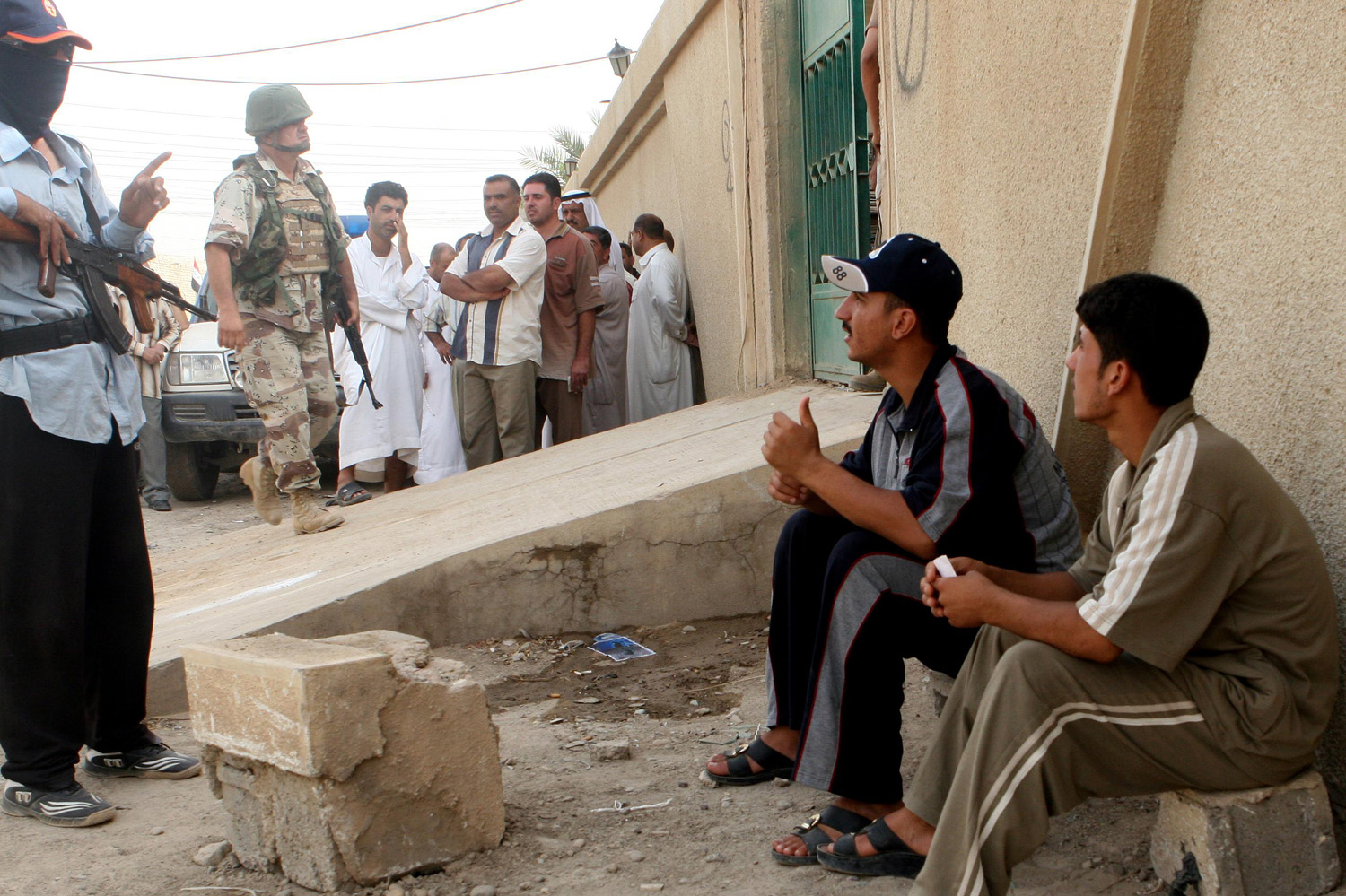
- An Iraqi policeman talks with two Iraqi civilians as they wait in line to receive new identification cards at a police precinct in Fallujah on 30 June 2007. As part of Operation Alljah, Marines and Iraqi Security Forces sectioned the city into precincts and set up operational stations where Iraqi civilians come in to receive identification cards, food, reimbursements and a chance to join the neighborhood watch program.
Date	17 June 2007 – 14 August 2007
Location	Fallujah and Karma, Iraq
Result	Security responsibility handed over to local police

Belligerents
United States; New Iraqi Army	Islamic State of Iraq; Other Iraqi Insurgents

Commanders and leaders
(United States) LtCol William F. Mullen III	Unknown

Strength
Unknown	Unknown

Casualties and losses
(United States) 6 killed (Iraq) 20 killed	39 killed (10 bombers)

Operation Alljah was an operation launched by Coalition forces in Iraq, mainly U.S. Marines, on 17 June 2007 to secure the neighborhoods of Fallujah. The strategy of the operation was somewhat based on a successful operation in Ramadi conducted in 2006. Insurgents in the town of Karma nearby were also targeted during the operation, which was part of the overall operation Phantom Thunder.

== Strategy ==
The strategy for Operation Alljah is based on a successful strategy used in the city of Ramadi. Fallujah was divided up into 11 sections managed by individual units of Iraqi policemen. U.S. commanders tried to keep the Iraqis in leading roles, with coalition forces in support.

To separate the parts of the city so that each isolated section could be dealt with more easily, the coalition forces set up barriers, leaving a limited number of access points to get between the districts of the city. This was intended to make it harder for wanted people to move throughout the city, and isolate trouble areas.

Each precinct had a building set as a base of operations, where civilians can receive various services, including food and limited damage reimbursement. These buildings also serve as recruitment centers and bases of operations for the Iraqi police in those precincts. The precinct headquarters also issue ID cards, which make it less of a hassle to get through checkpoints. The ID cards also make it easier to track suspects within the city.

== The Operation ==
In the western Al Anbar province operations attacked insurgent supply lines and weapons caches, targeting the regions of Fallujah, Karma and Tharthar. Commanders of the operation expressed belief that Fallujah would be cleared by August and that the regions of Karma and Tharthar would be cleared by July.

On 17 June, a raid near Karma killed a known Libyan Islamic State of Iraq fighter and six of his aides and on 21 June six Islamic State of Iraq members were killed and five were detained during early-morning raids also near Karma. Insurgents also struck back in Fallujah with two suicide bombings and an attack on an off-duty policeman that left four policemen dead on 22 June. The next day, a U.S. airstrike killed five suspects and destroyed their car bomb near Fallujah. On 29 June, U.S. forces killed a senior Islamic State of Iraq leader east of Fallujah. Abu 'Abd al-Rahman al-Masri, an Egyptian, was a veteran of both battles of Fallujah. On 6 July a raid west of Fallujah resulted in the killing of an Islamic State of Iraq battalion commander and two of his men and the capture of two more insurgents.

On 14 August, Marines in Fallujah formally handed over full responsibility for the security of Fallujah to local police. The same day the overall operation Phantom Thunder ended.

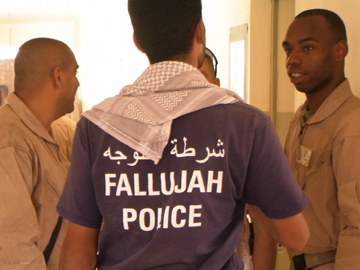
2nd Battalion 6th Marines Team 2 work with Fallujah Police to secure the first precinct.

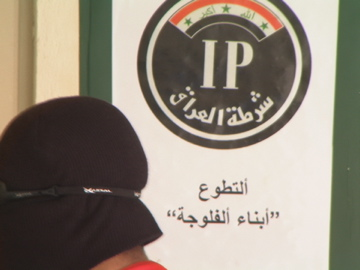
Iraqi Police deemed crucial to the success of Operation Alljah.

== Units involved ==
- Regimental Combat Team 6
  - 2nd Battalion 6th Marines
  - 3rd Battalion 6th Marines
  - 2nd Battalion 7th Marines
- Company B, 2nd Tank Battalion
- Department of Defense Security Forces, Tactical Response Team
- 2nd Marine Logistics Group
- 5th Battalion 10th Marines Civil Affairs Group (C.A.G)
- 3rd Battalion, 509th Parachute Infantry Regiment
- 2nd Battalion 5th Marines Golf Company

== See also ==
- 2007 in Iraq
- Iraq War
