= Battle of Baqubah =

Battle of the Iraq War

Second Battle of Baqubah Mar-Aug 2007
- Part of the Iraq War (Diyala province campaign)
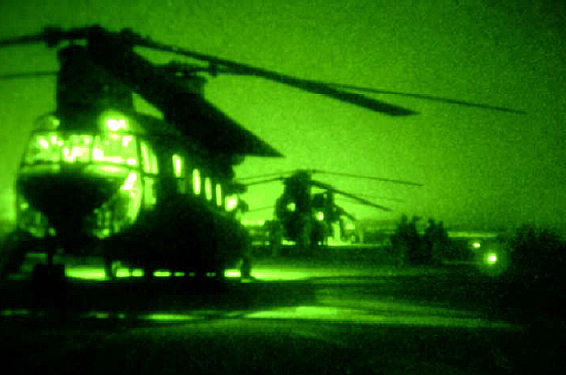
- Soldiers assigned to the 5th Battalion, 20th Infantry Regiment, have a short meeting at an airfield in Baqouba, Iraq before an air assault into an outlying village of the city, 18 June 2007.
Date	10 March – 19 August 2007 (5 months, 1 week and 2 days)
Location	Baqubah, Iraq
Result	Coalition victory
Territorial changes	City largely secured by Coalition forces although insurgent presence remained in the city and surrounding areas

Belligerents
United States; Iraq	Islamic State of Iraq

Commanders and leaders
COL Stephen Townsend; LTC Antonia; LTC Smiley †; LTC Goins	Abu Omar al-Baghdadi; Abu Hamza al-Muhajir

Strength
Approximately 700 combat troops and 2,000 support troops between 14 March and 17 June 2007, Approximately 2,000 combat troops and 5,000 support troops between 18 June and 31 August 2007.	Approximately 2,000-3,000

Casualties and losses
22 killed 40 wounded (U.S. Task Force Regulars 14–17 March June 2007); 9 killed, 15 wounded (U.S. Operation Arrowhead Ripper 18–31 June August 2007); (Iraq) 7 security forces killed 15 wounded 2 militia killed 3 police killed	382+ killed, some 100 detained

The Battle of Baqubah II (March–August 2007) took place during the Iraq War in the capital of the Iraqi province Diyala, to the north-east of Baghdad. It began in early March 2007, when U.S. and Iraqi forces commenced preliminary operations to "establish a presence in Diyala beyond their Forward Operating Base".

In June 2007 as part of a larger country wide offensive, Operation Arrowhead Ripper was launched to gain control of Baqubah and its surrounding areas from the insurgents. Baqubah was largely pacified as a result of this operation although insurgent presence still remained in the capital and throughout the province.

In August 2007, Operation Phantom Strike was launched throughout northern Iraq in order to capitalize on the gains made during Operation Phantom Thunder. As part of this offensive, Operation Lightning Hammer was launched to the northeast of Baqubah.

== Background ==
In mid-October 2006, the Mujahideen Shura Council announced the creation of Islamic State of Iraq (ISI), replacing the Mujahideen Shura Council (MSC) and its al-Qaeda in Iraq (AQI).

In late 2006, al-Qaeda in Iraq forces began a quiet troop build-up in Baqubah, naming it the capital of their "Islamic State of Iraq". As a result of the Baghdad Security Plan, in early 2007 al-Qaeda in Iraq forces withdrew from Baghdad in large numbers and began furthering operations in Diyala province. Emma Sky describes it as, at that time, the most violent part of Iraq. The insurgents fortified the province with observation posts, fighting positions, mines, and booby-trapped houses, as well as establishing supply bases and training camps. The large majority of these forces were positioned in the city of Baqubah, which was of great importance to al-Qaeda forces, having been declared the Capital of the Islamic State of Iraq. Military Intelligence templated the al-Qaeda forces within the city at 2,500 fighters, and an additional 500 support forces.

== Timeline ==
=== Battle for Baqubah II begins ===
A tactic employed by the insurgents in Buhriz was hit-and-run attacks with RPGs. With the support of Apache gunships firing Hellfire missiles, U.S. forces were able to inflict between 40 and 50 insurgent casualties on 14 March.

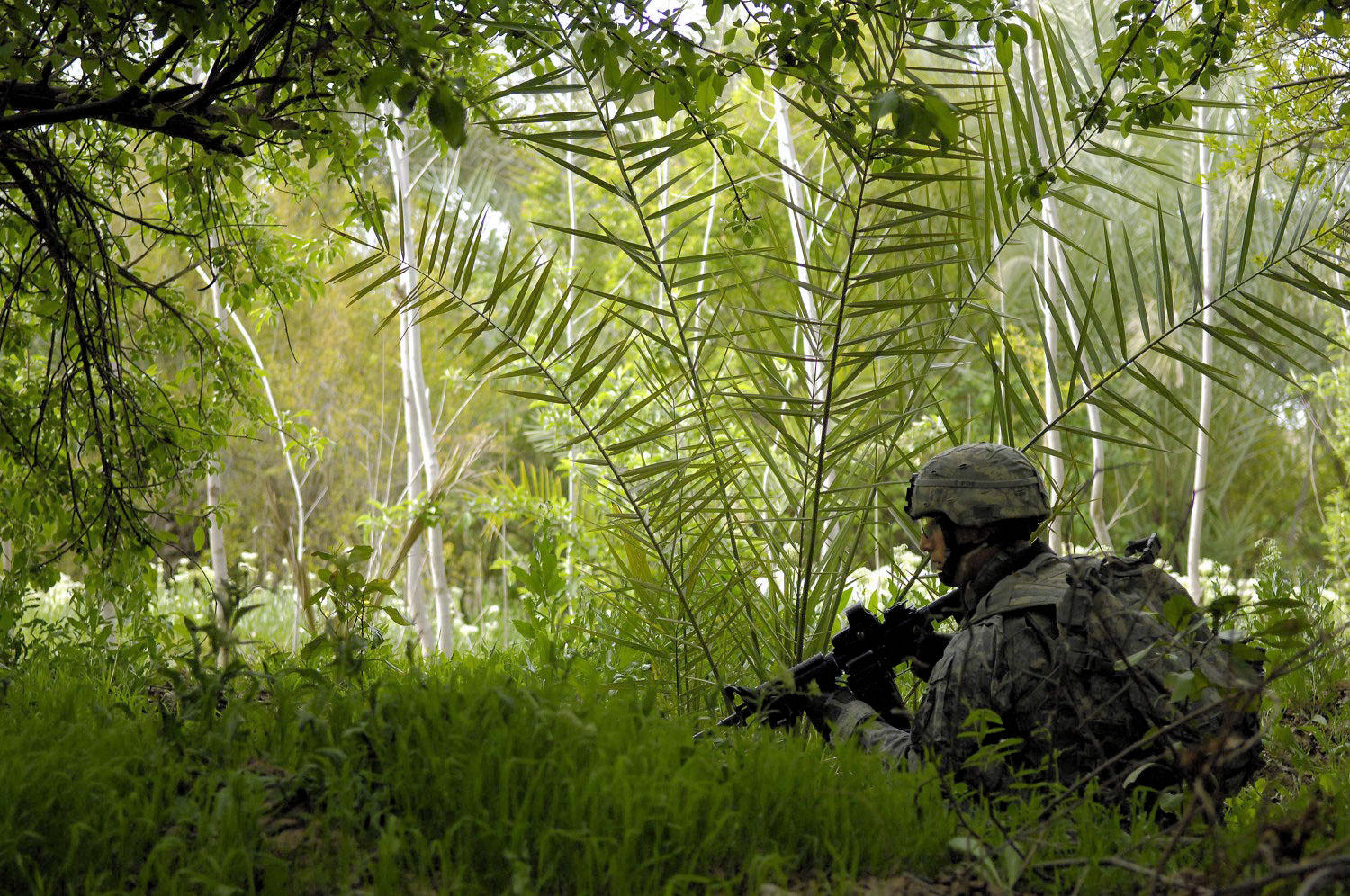
Soldiers from the 5th Battalion, 20th Infantry Regiment, conduct operations in Buhriz, 20 March 2007

A decision was made on 15 March to consolidate the task force and begin clearance operations of the palm groves surrounding Buhriz. What followed was close quarters jungle warfare more reminiscent of Vietnam than Iraq. The insurgent forces used a hit and run strategy, employing snipers, mines, prepositioned ambush sites, and escape routes. Insurgent forces were also confirmed to have fired at least one SA-7 missile at an Apache attack Helicopter, resulting in a very near miss. After a fierce week-long battle, Buhriz was predominantly under the control of American forces. While insurgents were no longer able to operate openly in Buhriz, there were still a small number of hit and run attacks, to include the use of mines, small arms, and snipers in this neighborhood. One such sniper attack on 24 May 2007 resulted in the death of a soldier from Task Force Regulars.

Over the next two months, a task force built around the 5-20 INF battalion which had expanded to include Alpha and Bronco Troop 1-14 Cavalry and two companies (A and B) of the 1st battalion, 12th Cavalry, systematically cleared the eastern half of Baqubah, and some of its outlying villages in the toughest fighting the battalion experienced during its 15-month deployment.

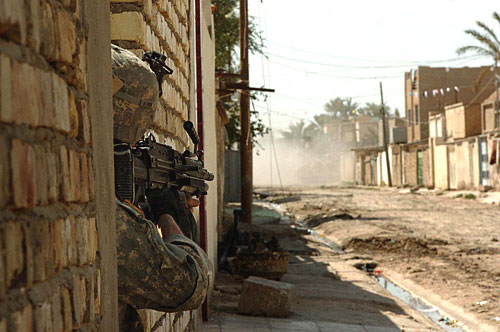
A soldier assigned to the 1st Platoon, Company B, 1-12 Combined Arms Battalion, 3rd Brigade Combat Team, 1st Cavalry Division, guards a street in the neighborhood of Tahrir in Baqubah, Iraq, 28 March 2007

The heavily fortified, and well defended Al-Qaeda controlled neighborhoods of Tahrir and New Baqubah were the next to be taken by American forces. The offensive's forward progression was again slowed by the use of large ambushes initiated by deep-buried mines or car bombs. One such ambush, on 5 April, resulted in a Bradley fighting vehicle being destroyed and the death of one American soldier. Of note, Army medic Christopher Waiters was eventually awarded the Distinguished Service Cross for his heroic actions that day which saved the lives of two additional American soldiers in the destroyed Bradley vehicle. Another similar attack initiated by a large deep buried mine killed six American soldiers in a Stryker vehicle on 6 May 2007, along with embedded Russian photojournalist Dmitry Chebotayev. The house-to-house fighting seen in eastern Baqubah during this offensive was the fiercest fighting in Iraq at the time. Al-Qaeda in Iraq was pitching a last-ditch effort to retain control of their self-declared capital. On 27 May while clearing Chibernat, a village north of Baqubah, seven Iraqi hostages were rescued from an al-Qaeda torture center. While clearance of eastern Baqubah was being completed, Task Force Regulars was able to successfully isolate and contain the western half of the city, composed of Mufrek, Mujema, and Khatoon. Without adequate forces to clear this western half of Baqubah the commander of Task Force Regular, Lt. Colonol Bruce Antonia, requested additional forces to assist in that task.

=== Operation Arrowhead Ripper ===
In early June Lt. Colonel Antonia's request for assistance was answered. The 3/2 Brigade Command Staff and the Regular's sister Battalion the 1st Battalion 23rd infantry, Tomahawks arrived. In June 2007 U.S. and Iraqi forces launched a major offensive operation throughout Iraq codenamed Operation Phantom Thunder designed to secure the Baghdad Belts. As part of this offensive, Multinational Division North launched Operation Arrowhead Ripper in Diyala province. The 3rd Stryker Brigade Combat Team, 2nd Infantry Division along with members of the 2-505th 82nd Airborne Division, launched the offensive with a quick-strike night-time air assault early on 18 June 2007. By daylight, attack helicopters and ground forces had engaged and killed an estimated 22-plus insurgents in and around Baqubah. In the early morning hours one soldier, from A co 1-12 CAV, was killed when his Bradley fighting vehicle was struck by a large deep buried mine just outside an abandoned clinic on the Southwestern edge of the city. In all 30 insurgents and one U.S. soldier were killed by the end of the first day of the operation, according to military sources.

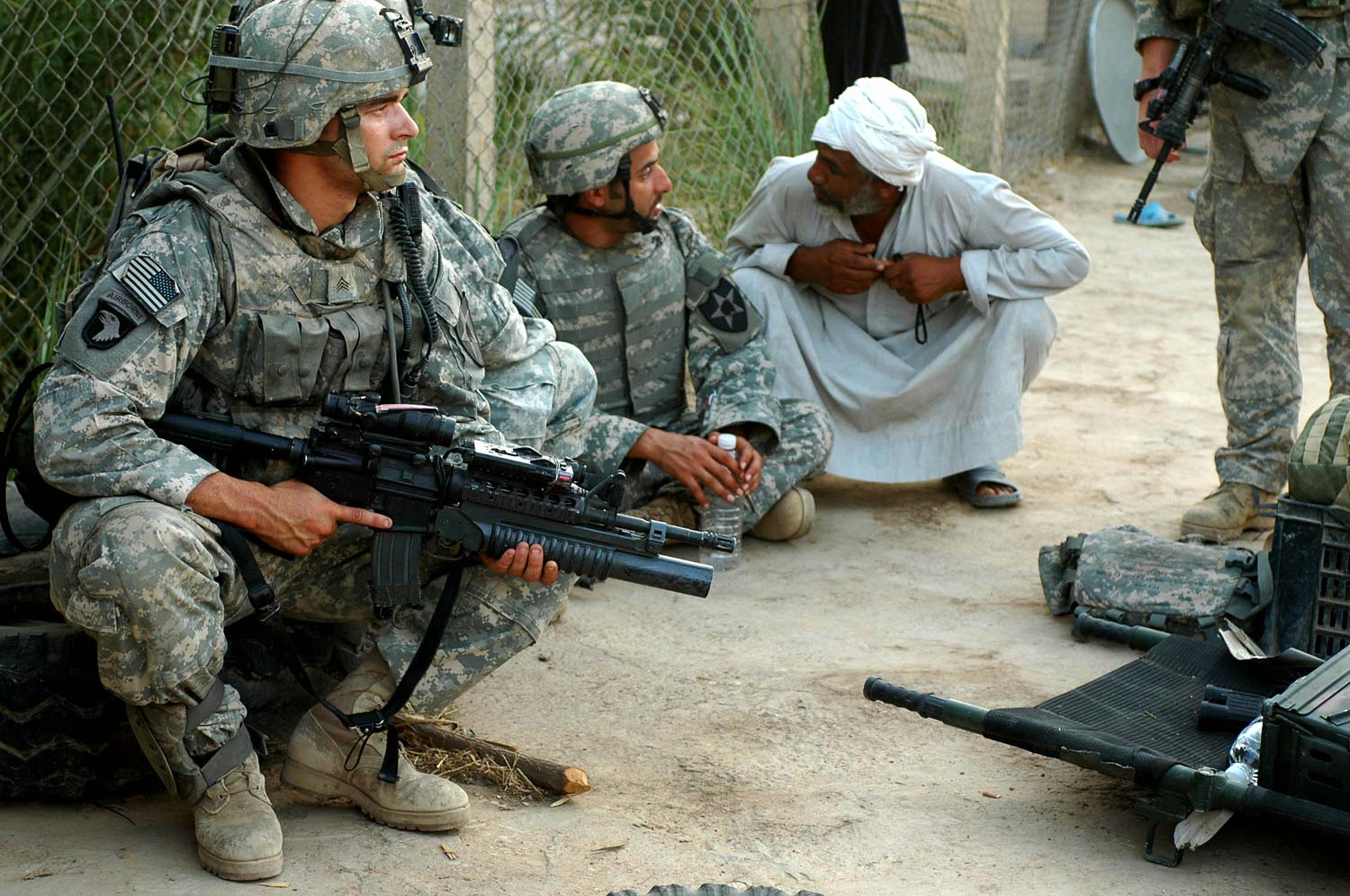
A team leader with Operation Arrowhead Ripper pulls security as an Iraqi man speaks to an interpreter, 19 June, in a village in the outskirts of Baqubah, 19 June 2007.

"The end state is to destroy the al-Qaeda influences in this province and eliminate their threat against the people", said Brig. Gen. Mick Bednarek, deputy commanding general, operations, 25th Infantry Division. "That is the number one, bottom-line up-front, in-your-face, task and purpose".

Approximately 2,000 American combat soldiers, with an additional 4,500 American support troops located on F.O.B. Warhorse, An Iraqi Army Brigade, 500 Iraqi Police officers, 155 mm Howitzer Field Artillery support, an almost continuous Apache attack helicopter presence, American and British close air support, Stryker and Bradley Fighting Vehicles, took part in Arrowhead Ripper.

"One of the keys as we initiate combat actions and operations here is the newly formed Diyala Operations Center", Bednarek said. "It serves as an integration center that will coordinate all activities in Diyala—the police, the army and Coalition Forces from Task Force Lightning.”

"The key significance, though, is getting the Iraqi ministries engaged to provide fundamental goods and services, such as food, fuel, displaced persons support, and education", Bednarek continued. "The governor will have oversight and the people will start to see improved basic services which will build the trust and confidence of the people not only in the provincial government, but in the central government as well".

Throughout the clearance operations in Western Baqubah one trend continued to occur. The local population were overjoyed to be, as they put it, "liberated" by the American Forces. These neighborhoods, while under al-Qaeda control, had been subjected to Sharia, very strict Islamic law, with severe penalties. The local populace talked of things like smoking, women failing to wear appropriate facial and body coverings, or even placing cucumbers too close to tomatoes on a vegetable cart as being very harshly punished. This was the location of several al-Qaeda detention and torture centers, where punishments handed down by these Islamic courts were carried out. These punishments included amputation, eye removal and death just to name a few.

On 23 June two suspected senior Tanzim Qaidat al-Jihad fi Bilad al-Rafidayn leaders were captured and detained to Baghdad; no further information on their identity has been forthcoming. It is feared that most high-profile suspects have fled the area before the operation began.

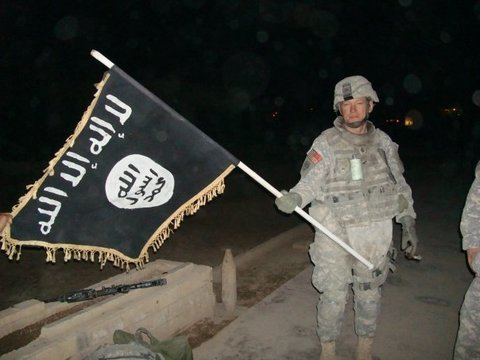
U.S. Army soldier with captured ISI flag.

As of 26 June, significant fighting continued. Insurgent casualties were given as 55 on 23 June. Until 27 June, an estimated five more militants, possibly more, were reported killed by Coalition sources.

By 28 June, fighting in at least parts of the town had ceased. U.S. and allied troops were documented moving about in daylight and relaxed poses. On 1 July, three Iraqi soldiers were killed and three others wounded during a raid on a town house, but although there is some violence such as murders, this generally seems civil rather than (para) military in nature and as of 4 July, there was little indication that the situation in Baqubah is different from other places in Iraq with significant MNF presence.

On the other hand, the town of Al Khalis, approximately 15 km away, seems to have become a major restaging point for insurgents retreating from Baqubah, despite the nearby presence of significant U.S. forces at FOB Grizzly and People's Mujahedin of Iran personnel at "Ashraf City".

On 3 July, MNF troops killed 25 and detained five suspected terrorists and uncovered ten weapons caches during a three-day operation at Mukhisa, northeast of Baqubah, in support of Operation Arrowhead Ripper.

However, fighting flared up again some days later, with numerous reports of casualties later that week. Residents reported that the shelling was intense, and the Iraqi Islamic Party (ISP) has accused the Multi-National Forces operating in the area of committing a new massacre in Baqubah. "The operations led by the U.S. forces in western Baqubah led to the death of more than 350 people, most of whom are still under the rubble," the ISP said in a statement. The majority of American shelling and aerial bombardment that occurred during July and August was to defeat the overwhelming number of explosive laden houses, that were rigged and left behind as traps by the fleeing al-Qaeda forces. One such home was detonated on American forces attempting to clear it of insurgent forces on 6 August, and resulted in four American deaths. The U.S. army admits that nearly 80 per cent of al-Qaeda leaders fled the area, in June, during the initial stages of the operation.

15 July Aco 1-12 Cavalry engaged insurgents in the Mechanics area of Southern Baqubah, killing two and wounding three.

16 July, Aco 1-12 Cav members were ambushed while patrolling in insurgent occupied areas of Palm Groves south of Baqubah on the Diyala river. Several friendly Sunni militiamen were killed and wounded by a mine that initiated the ambush.

On 14 August, the overall operation Phantom Thunder ended and operation Arrowhead Ripper ended 19 August. Baqubah was largely secured by Coalition forces, but still some insurgent presence remained in the city and surrounding areas, but not in such large numbers as it was before the attack on the city.

=== Operation Lightning Hammer ===
Lightning Hammer I was launched on 13 August 2007 as a follow-on to Operation Arrowhead Ripper and was subordinate to Operation Phantom Strike. The aim of the operation was to clear insurgent elements from the Diyala river valley and involved around 16,000 U.S. and Iraqi forces. During the operation, 50 villages in the Diyala province were cleared, 26 members of AQI were killed and 37 suspected insurgents were detained. On 1 September, the operation ended. Lightning Hammer II was launched in early September.

== Order of battle ==
=== Coalition ===
In the city itself:

- 3rd Brigade Combat Team (SBCT), 2nd Infantry Division. Commanded by COL Stephen Townsend
  - 5th Battalion, 20th Infantry. Commanded by LTC Antonia
    - B Troop, 1st Squadron, 14th Cavalry Regiment attached to 5-20.
    - A co 1st Battalion, 12th Cavalry, 1CD Attached to 5-20IN (New Baqubah)
    - B co 1st Battalion, 12th Cavalry, 1CD Attached to 5-20IN (Old Baqubah, Tahrir, & Buritz)
  - Bravo Company, 2-505th PIR
  - 18th Engineer Company
  - 209th Military Intelligence Company
  - 1st Battalion, 23rd Infantry. Commanded by LTC Smiley
  - Delta

Company, 2nd Battalion, 35th Infantry Regiment, 3rd Infantry Brigade Combat Team

    - C Company, 52d Infantry (Anti-Tank) attached to 1-23.
- Elements of the Iraqi Army 5th Division (Iraq)

Supporting the main effort:

- 1-12(-) Cav Commanded by LTC Goins 3rd BCT 1st Cav Division
- 4th SBCT, 2nd Infantry Division
  - 2nd Squadron, 1st Cavalry,
  - Bravo Company, 4th Battalion, 9th Infantry Regiment,
  - Charlie Company, 4th Battalion, 9th Infantry Regiment,
  - Charlie Company, 2nd Battalion, 23rd Infantry Regiment,
  - 38th Engineer Company
  - 2nd Battalion, 12th Field Artillery
- 3rd Brigade Combat Team (BCT), 82nd Airborne Division
  - 1st Platoon, Alpha Company, 1-505th Parachute Infantry Regiment (PIR)
  - 2nd Platoon, Alpha Company, 1-505th Parachute Infantry Regiment (PIR)
  - HQ Platoon, Alpha Company, 1-505th Parachute Infantry Regiment (PIR)
  - 5th Squadron, 73rd Cavalry
  - Scout helicopters from B Troop 1st Squadron, 17th Cavalry, 82nd Aviation Brigade
- 3rd Brigade Combat Team, 1st Cavalry Division
  - 1st Battalion, 12th Cavalry
  - Bandit Troop, 6th Squadron, 9th Cavalry Regiment (Reconnaissance Scouts)
  - 215th Brigade Support Battalion
- 25th Infantry Division
  - Bravo Company, 2nd Battalion, 35th Infantry Regiment, 3rd Infantry Brigade Combat Team
  - 3rd Platoon, Charlie Company, 2nd Battalion, 35th Infantry Regiment, 3rd Infantry Brigade Combat Team
  - Mortar Section, Charlie Company, 2nd Battalion, 35th Infantry Regiment, 3rd Infantry Brigade Combat Team
  - Attack helicopters from the 1st Attack Reconnaissance Battalion, 82nd Aviation Regiment, 82nd Airborne Division attached to 25th Combat Aviation Brigade.
  - Company C, 1st Battalion (Assault), 150th Aviation Regiment, West Virginia Army National Guard, UH-60 Black Hawk helicopters attached to the 25th Combat Aviation Brigade.
  - 72nd MAC Combat Engineer Company, 1st Engineer Battalion, 1st Infantry Brigade
- 571st Military Police Company, 42nd Military Police Brigade
- 3rd Brigade Combat Team (SBCT), 2nd Infantry Division.
  - 296th Brigade Support Battalion
  - 334th Signal Company
  - 209th Military Intelligence Company
- 115th Mobile Public Affairs Detachment
- 5th Mobile Public Affairs Detachment
- 15th Engineer Company, 19th Engineer Battalion.

=== Islamic State of Iraq ===
Details of insurgent forces are unknown. Based on the number of attacks, and the level of control exerted over the local populace, American Intelligence estimated the enemy strength in Baqubah at approximately 2,000 to 2,500 in March 2007. As the Islamic State of Iraq considered the town of Baqubah its "capital", presumably most fighters opposing the MNF troops belonged to the Khalf al-Mutayibeen—the alliance of Islamist Sunni groups behind the ISI.

== See also ==
- List of coalition military operations of the Iraq War
- Operation Commando Eagle
- Operation Imposing Law
- Operation Marne Torch
- Operation Phantom Thunder
- Iraq War troop surge of 2007
