= Stephen J. Townsend =

United States Army four-star general

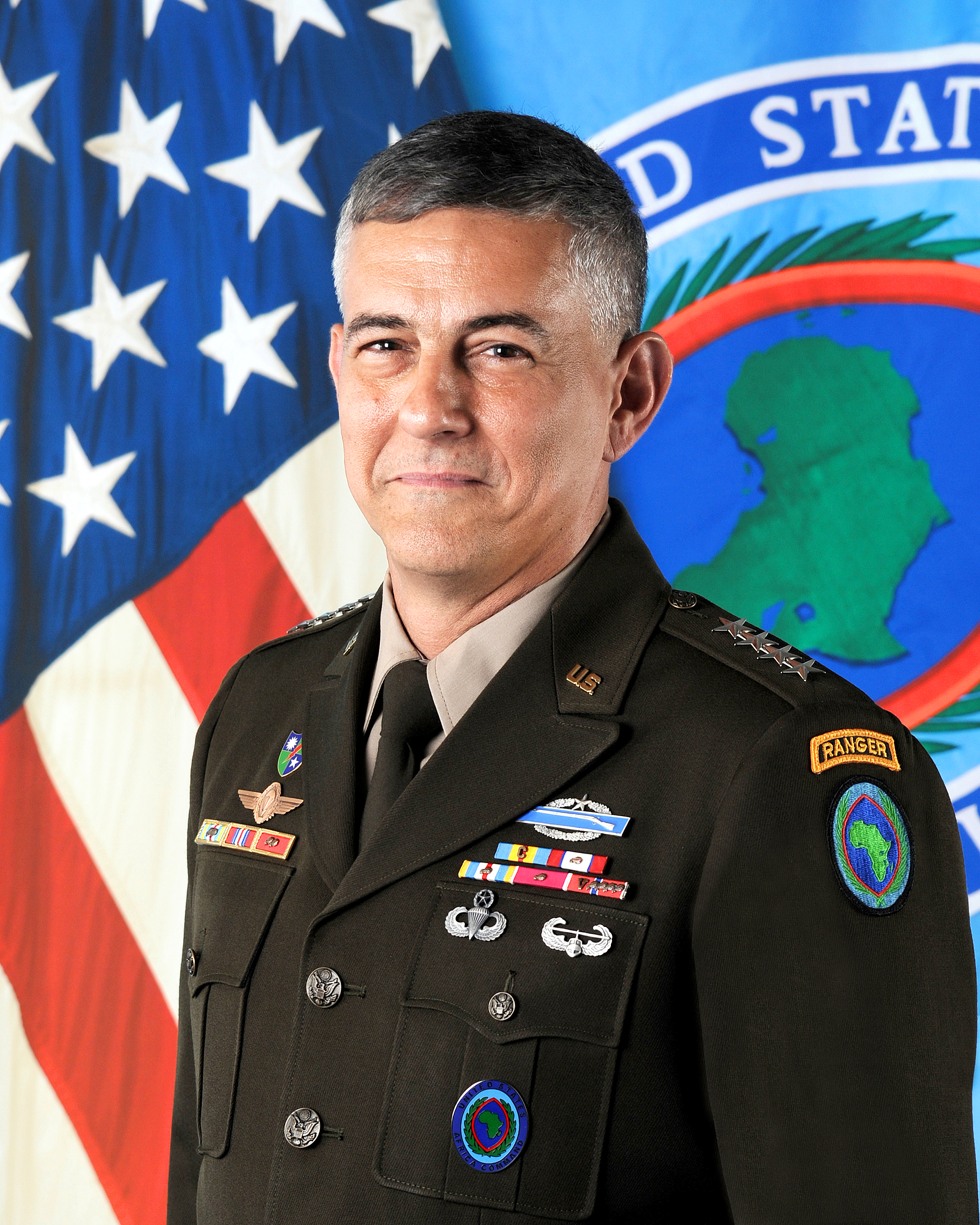
- Official portrait, 2019
- Born: 1959 (age 66–67); Scheinfeld, West Germany
- Spouse: Melissa Crawford
- Children: 2
- Military career
- Allegiance: United States of America
- Branch: United States Army
- Service years: 1982–2022
- Rank: General
- Nickname: "Steve"
- Commands: United States Africa Command; United States Army Training and Doctrine Command; Combined Joint Task Force – Operation Inherent Resolve; XVIII Airborne Corps; 10th Mountain Division; 3d Brigade Combat Team, 2d Infantry Division
- Conflicts: Invasion of Grenada; Operation Uphold Democracy; American invasion of Panama; Global War on Terrorism: War in Afghanistan; Operation Anaconda; Iraq War; Battle of Baqubah; Operation Inherent Resolve; Iraqi Campaign; Syrian Campaign
- Awards: Defense Distinguished Service Medal w/ "C" device Army Distinguished Service Medal (3); Defense Superior Service Medal (2); Legion of Merit (2); Bronze Star Medal (5) w/ "V" device Defense Meritorious Service Medal; Meritorious Service Medal (6)

Stephen J. Townsend (born 1959) is an American retired United States Army four-star general who served as Commander United States Africa Command from 26 July 2019 to 8 August 2022. He previously commanded the United States Army Training and Doctrine Command from March 2018 until June 2019 and XVIII Airborne Corps from May 2015 until January 2018.

Townsend has served with the 82nd Airborne Division, the 7th Infantry Division, the 75th Ranger Regiment, the 78th Division (Training Support), and the 10th Mountain Division. He fought in Operation Urgent Fury, Operation Just Cause, and Operation Uphold Democracy. With the 10th Mountain Division, he served in the War in Afghanistan, leading a task force in Operation Anaconda. Townsend commanded the 3d Brigade Combat Team, 2d Infantry Division leading it in the Battle of Baqubah in the Iraq War, and later served in command of the 10th Mountain Division in the War in Afghanistan. He became commander of XVIII Airborne Corps in May 2015 and, in late August 2016, took command of the Combined Joint Task Force – Operation Inherent Resolve, until III Corps commander Lieutenant General Paul E. Funk II took over command of the operation in 2017.

== Early life and education ==
Townsend was born in Scheinfeld, Bavaria, West Germany, in 1959 to a German art student mother and a Pashtun Afghan medical student father, the result of a love affair. He was adopted soon after birth by an American military family in Germany. His adoptive father, James Townsend, was a staff sergeant in an armored unit. Townsend grew up in Griffin, Georgia, graduating from Griffin High School in 1978. Townsend graduated from North Georgia College in 1982 with a bachelor's degree in psychology. He was commissioned into the Infantry from the Army Reserve Officers' Training Corps thereafter. Townsend also earned a Master of Military Arts and Sciences (MMAS) degree at the United States Army Command and General Staff College, and a Master of Strategic Studies (MSS) degree at the Army War College.

== Military career ==
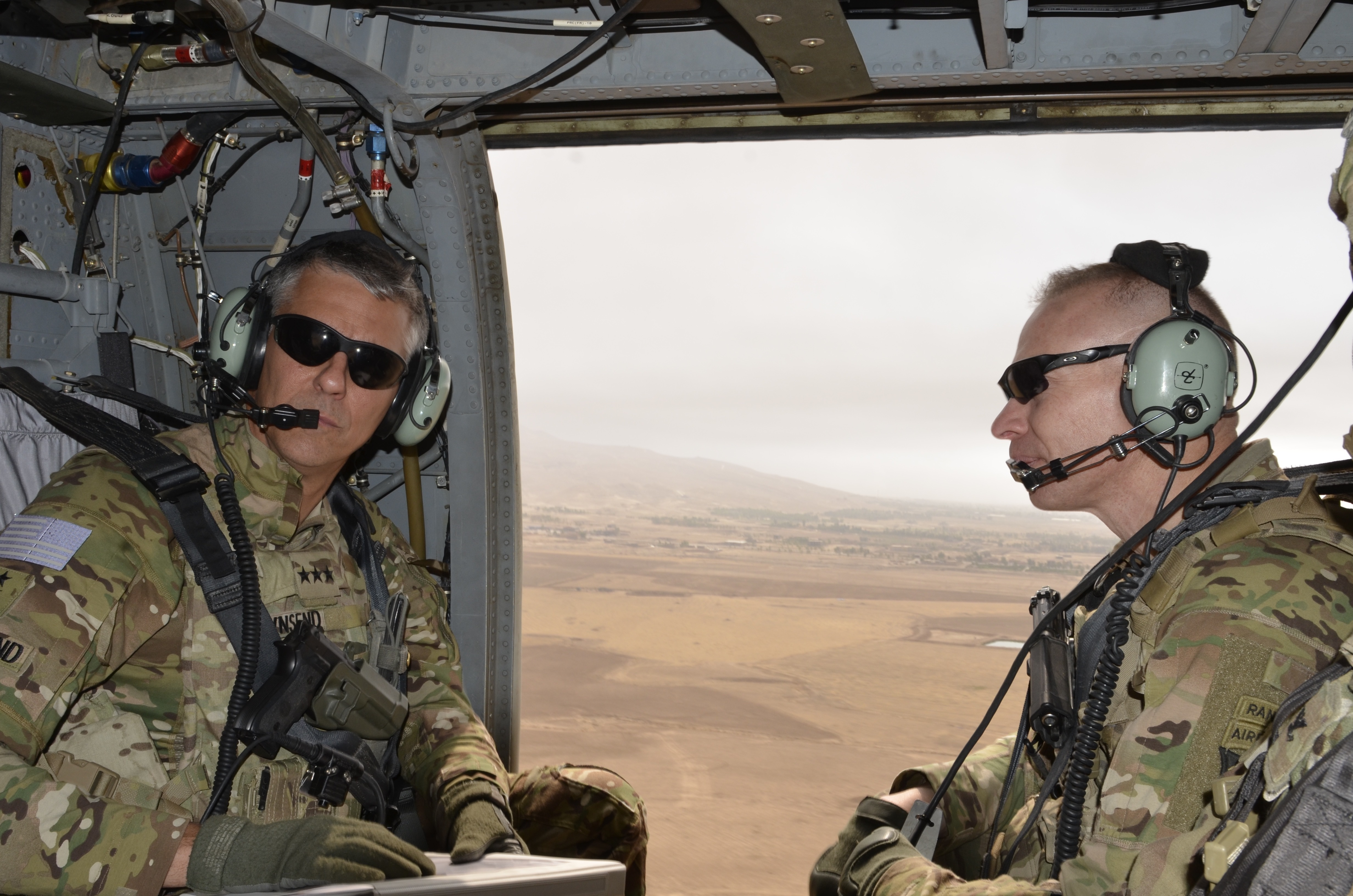
Townsend and Colonel Brett G. Sylvia, the commander of 2nd Brigade Combat Team, 101st Airborne Division, travel to visit troops with Task Force Strike, 101st Airborne Division, Qayyarah West Airfield, Iraq, September 2016.

After receiving his commission as a second lieutenant in 1982, Townsend served as platoon leader, executive officer and assistant plans, operations, and training officer (assistant S3) in 2nd Battalion (Airborne), 505th Infantry, 82nd Airborne Division. He participated in Operation Urgent Fury in Grenada. He was transferred to the 7th Infantry Division (Light) at Fort Ord as the 4th Battalion, 21st Infantry S3. He became commander of the battalion's Company A. After being transferred to Fort Benning, Townsend became S3 (Air) and assistant S3 at 75th Ranger Regiment headquarters. He participated in Operation Just Cause in Panama and later became commander of Company C, 3d Battalion, 75th Ranger Regiment.

Townsend graduated from the Command and General Staff College and returned to Fort Benning, where he was Senior Liaison Office for the 75th Ranger Regiment headquarters and the S3 of the 3d Battalion, 75th Ranger Regiment. He participated in Operation Uphold Democracy in Haiti. Townsend was transferred to United States Pacific Command in Hawaii as J-5 Action Officer. He later became Special Assistant to the Combatant Commander. Townsend was sent to Fort Drum in New York, becoming S3 of the 2d Brigade, 78th Division (Training Support) in 1999. In 2000, he became commander of the 4th Battalion, 31st Infantry in the 10th Mountain Division (Light). Townsend became commander of Task Force Polar Bear, deployed to Afghanistan during Operation Anaconda in 2002. Townsend graduated from the United States Army War College and became Division G3 of the 10th Mountain Division (Light) in 2003. From 2004, he was Director of Operations, C/J3 for Combined Joint Task Force 180 during Operation Enduring Freedom in Afghanistan.

Townsend was appointed commander of the 3d Brigade Combat Team, 2d Infantry Division at Fort Lewis. He led Task Force Arrowhead during the Iraq War. Townsend led the brigade in the Battle of Baqubah in June 2007. Townsend became executive officer for the United States Central Command commander at Tampa, Florida. He then became senior commander at Fort Campbell and then was Deputy Commanding General (Operations) for the 101st Airborne Division (Air Assault) from 2009. Townsend served in the same position for Combined Joint Task Force 101 during Operation Enduring Freedom. He became Director of the Pakistan/Afghanistan Coordination Cell at the Joint Chiefs of Staff. On 4 December 2012, Townsend became commander of the 10th Mountain Division. He also led Combined Joint Task Force 10 and Regional Command East at Bagram.

On 4 May 2015, Townsend became commander of the XVIII Airborne Corps. He was promoted to lieutenant general shortly before. Townsend became commander of Combined Joint Task Force (CJTF) – Operation Inherent Resolve (OIR) on 21 August 2016, replacing Lieutenant General Sean MacFarland. In this capacity he commanded US forces as they engaged in an air war (supported by special forces and limited Marine deployments plus material and intelligence support to bolster allied ground forces) against the Islamic State of Iraq and the Levant (ISIL). U.S. airstrikes killed tens of thousands of ISIL fighters and catalyzed enormous losses in territory for them.

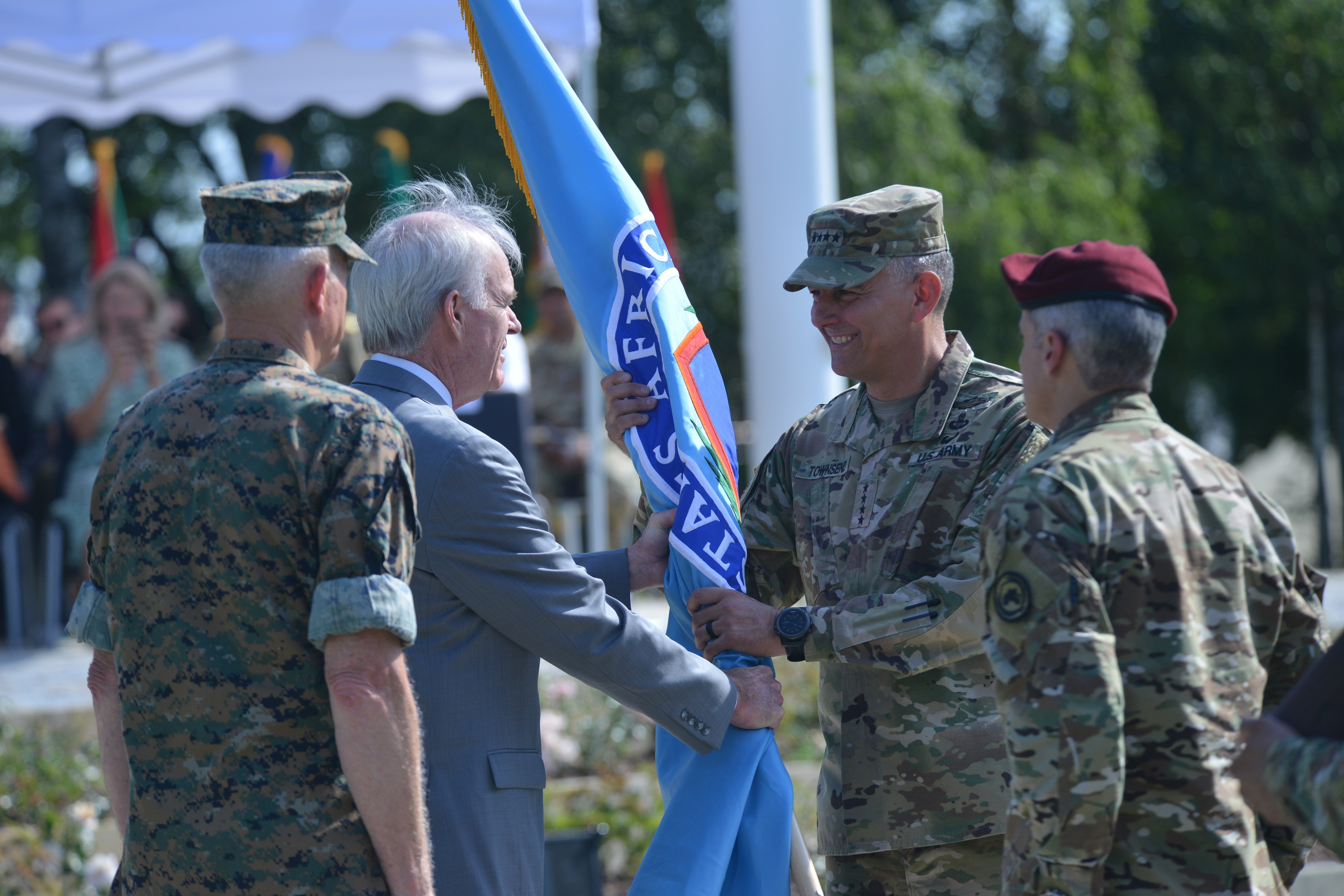
Townsend receives the AFRICOM command guidon from acting Deputy Secretary of Defense Richard V. Spencer on 26 July 2019

Under Townsend, the CJTF-OIR coalition together with allies from the Syrian Democratic Forces, the Iraqi Security Forces, and the Libyan Government of National Accord launched simultaneous successful offensives against ISIL's capitals in Syria, Iraq, and Libya respectively: the Raqqa campaign (2016–2017), the Battle of Mosul (2016–2017), and the Battle of Sirte (2016). By the end of 2017 ISIL no longer held any territory in Iraq or Libya, held very little territory in Syria, and was down to under ten thousand fighters in total. The Iraqi Parliament declared in December 2017 that ISIL had effectively been eradicated from Iraq, though ISIL insurgent activity continued regularly.

On 26 March 2017, United States forces allegedly bombed the Tabqa Dam in Syria using bombs including at least one BLU-109 bunker-buster bomb with a 2,000 lb warhead. This attack was under a "no-strike" list due to the hundreds of thousands people that lived downstream of the dam, roughly 10,000 of which were estimated to have died if the dam failed. Townsend, then in command of the Combined Joint Task Force, called claims that the US had struck the dam "crazy reporting" and "the coalition has taken every precaution to ensure the integrity of Tabqa Dam".

On 27 November 2017, Townsend was nominated for appointment as the next commanding general of United States Army Training and Doctrine Command (TRADOC) and promotion to general. The nomination was confirmed by the United States Senate on 20 December. Townsend took command of TRADOC on 2 March 2018.

Townsend became the fifth commander of the United States Africa Command on 26 July 2019. He leads a command responsible for building defense capabilities, responding to crises, deterring and defeating transnational threats in order to advance United States national interests and promote regional security, stability, and prosperity, all in concert with interagency and international partners. Africa Command is one of seven United States Department of Defense geographic combatant commands. In September 2022, upon his retirement, GEN Townsend was succeeded at AFRICOM by General Michael Langley of the United States Marine Corps.

== Awards and decorations ==
Townsend is the recipient of the following awards:

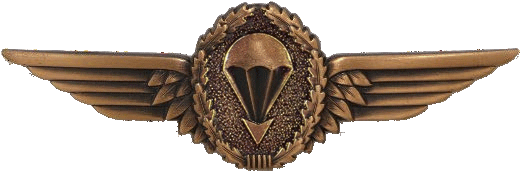
Combat Infantryman Badge with star (denoting 2nd award)
Expert Infantryman Badge
Combat Action Badge
Master Parachutist Badge
Ranger tab
Air Assault Badge
Spanish Parachutist Badge
German Parachutist badge in bronze
United States Africa Command Badge
10th Mountain Division Shoulder sleeve insignia
75th Ranger Regiment Distinctive Unit Insignia
10 Overseas Service Bars

Defense Distinguished Service Medal with "C" device
Army Distinguished Service Medal with two bronze oak leaf clusters
Defense Superior Service Medal with oak leaf cluster
Legion of Merit with oak leaf cluster
Bronze Star Medal with "V" device and four oak leaf clusters
Defense Meritorious Service Medal
Meritorious Service Medal with silver oak leaf cluster
Army Commendation Medal with two oak leaf clusters
Joint Service Achievement Medal
Army Achievement Medal with four oak leaf clusters
Joint Meritorious Unit Award with two oak leaf clusters
Valorous Unit Award
Meritorious Unit Commendation with two oak leaf clusters
National Defense Service Medal with one bronze service star
Armed Forces Expeditionary Medal with two service stars
Afghanistan Campaign Medal with three campaign stars
Iraq Campaign Medal with two campaign stars
Inherent Resolve Campaign Medal with campaign star
Global War on Terrorism Expeditionary Medal
Global War on Terrorism Service Medal
Humanitarian Service Medal with service star
Army Service Ribbon
Army Overseas Service Ribbon with bronze award numeral 6
NATO Medal for Service with ISAF

Military offices
Preceded by Mark Milley	Commanding General, 10th Mountain Division; 2012–2015	Succeeded by Jeffrey L. Bannister
Preceded by Joseph Anderson	Commanding General, XVIII Airborne Corps; 2015–2018	Succeeded by Paul LaCamera
Preceded by Sean MacFarland	Commanding General, Combined Joint Task Force - Operation Inherent Resolve; 2016–2017	Succeeded by Paul E. Funk II
Preceded by David G. Perkins	Commanding General, United States Army Training and Doctrine Command; 2018–2019	Succeeded by Paul E. Funk II
Preceded by Thomas D. Waldhauser	Commander of the United States Africa Command; 2019–2022	Succeeded by Michael E. Langley
