= Operation Imposing Law =

2007 military operation in Baghdad, Iraq

- Part of the Battle of Baghdad (2006–2008) and the Iraq War (Operation Phantom Thunder)
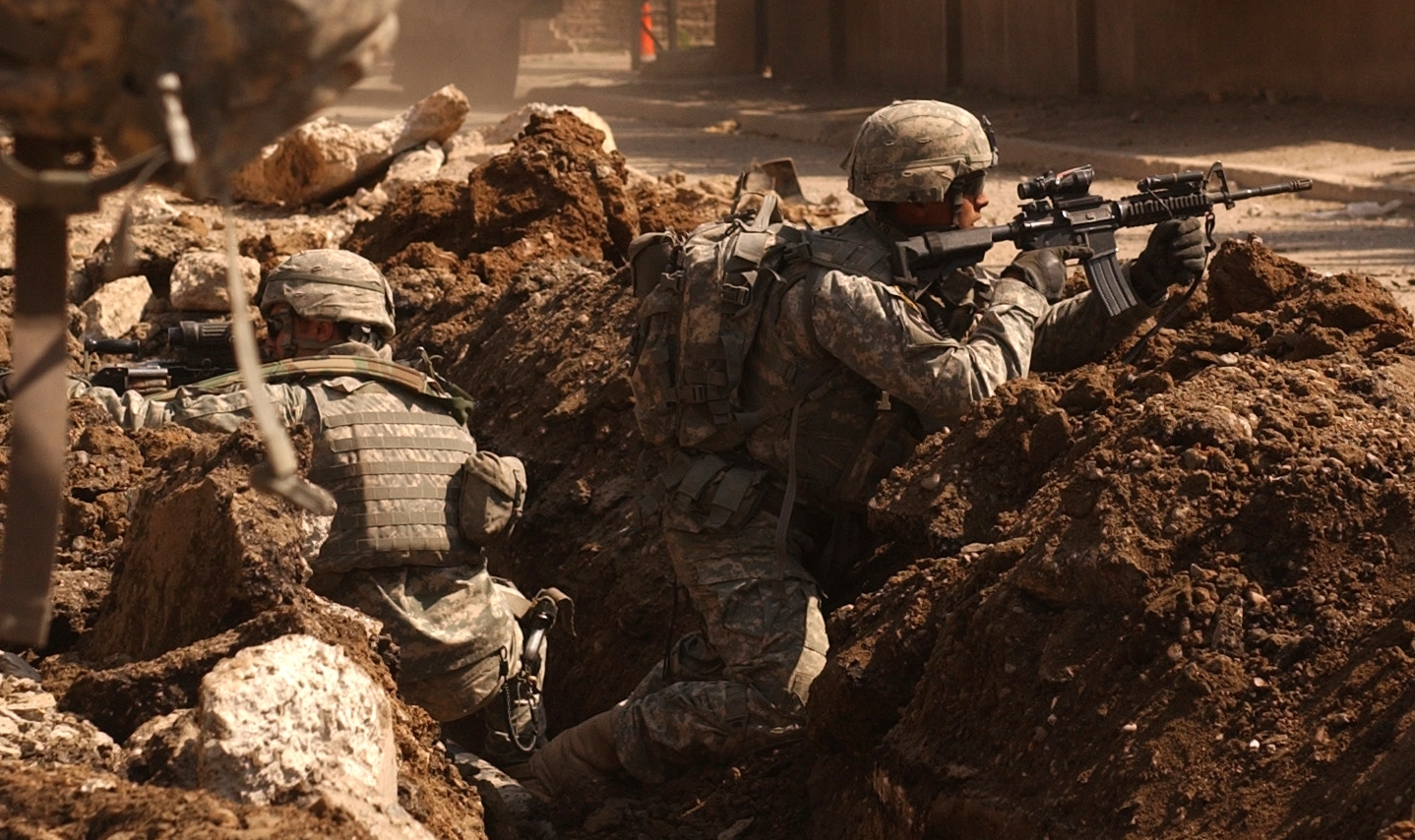
- U.S. soldiers take cover during a firefight with insurgents in the Dora section of Baghdad 7 March 2007
Date	14 February – 24 November 2007 (9 months, 1 week and 3 days)
Location	Baghdad, Iraq
Result	Coalition victory (Whole city, except for Sadr city and the southern portion, come under coalition control)

Belligerents
United States; United Kingdom; Iraq; Poland; Awakening movements in Iraq	Mahdi Army Islamic State of Iraq Other Iraqi Insurgents

Commanders and leaders
(Iraq) Abboud Qanbar (United States) David Petraeus (United Kingdom) James Cowan	Abu Ahmed Al Jarrari

Strength
90,000	Unknown

Casualties and losses
(Iraq) 528 security forces killed, 7 militia killed (United States) 324 killed, 1,000+ wounded (United Kingdom) 18 killed (Poland) 1 killed 4 foreign mercenaries killed 7 foreign contractors killed	1,219 killed (97 bombers)
- 7,482 civilians killed

Operation Imposing Law, also known as Operation Law and Order (Arabic: عملية القانون والنظام, romanized: amaliat al-qaanoon wa an-nazaam), Operation Fardh al-Qanoon (Arabic: فرض القانون) or Baghdad Security Plan (BSP), was a joint Coalition-Iraqi security plan conducted throughout Baghdad. Under the Surge plan developed in late 2006, Baghdad was to be divided into nine zones, with Iraqi and American soldiers working side by side to clear each sector of Shiite militias and Sunni insurgents and establish Joint Security Stations so that reconstruction programs could begin in safety. The U.S. military commander in Iraq, David Petraeus, went so far as to say Iraq would be "doomed" if this plan failed. Numerous members of Congress stated the plan was a critical period for the U.S. presence in Iraq.

== Background ==
In mid-October 2006, al-Qaeda announced the creation of the Islamic State of Iraq (ISI), replacing the Mujahideen Shura Council (MSC) and its al-Qaeda in Iraq (AQI).

On 10 February 2007, General David Petraeus replaced General Casey as the commander of Multi National Force-Iraq and Admiral William Fallon replaced General Abizaid as CENTCOM Commander on 16 March 2007.

The operation was led by Iraqi General Abboud Qanbar, a veteran of the Iran-Iraq and Gulf wars. General Qanbar was a compromise choice because General Mohan al-Furayji, the first choice of the Iraqi Prime Minister, Nouri al-Maliki, to head the operation, was rejected by the U.S. Army.

On the first day of the operation new checkpoints were erected and increased vehicle inspections and foot patrols were reported in some neighborhoods. The operation was billed as a major neighborhood-to-neighborhood sweep to quell sectarian violence in the city of 6 million.

== The Operation ==
In conducting the Baghdad Security Plan (BSP) (Fardh al-Qanoon in Arabic), coalition forces "erected security walls around public gathering spots like markets, rounded up weapons caches, and detained suspected Sunni insurgents and Shiite death squads" and set up "'joint security sites' and even smaller 'combat outposts'."

=== Coalition military order of battle ===
==== Description of the plan ====
In a 16 February 2007, press conference, United States Major General Joseph Fil described the operational design of the Baghdad Security Plan as follows:

"This new plan involves three basic parts: clear, control and retain. The first objective within each of the security districts in the Iraqi capital is to clear out extremist elements neighborhood by neighborhood in an effort to protect the population. And after an area is cleared, we're moving to what we call the control operation. Together with our Iraqi counterparts, we'll maintain a full-time presence on the streets, and we'll do this by building and maintaining joint security stations throughout the city. This effort to re-establish the joint security stations is well under way. The number of stations in each district will be determined by the commanders on the ground who control that area. An area moves into the retain phase when the Iraqi security forces are fully responsible for the day-to-day security mission. At this point, coalition forces begin to move out of the neighborhood and into locations where they can respond to requests for assistance as needed. During these three phrases, efforts will be ongoing to stimulate local economies by creating employment opportunities, initiating reconstruction projects and improving the infrastructure. These efforts will be spearheaded by neighborhood advisory councils, district advisory councils and the government of Iraq."

==== Security districts ====
The nine Baghdad security districts corresponded to Baghdad administrative districts and were named as follows: Adhamiyah, Karkh, Karadah (Kharadah), Kadhimyah, Mansour, Sadr City (Thawr), Al Rashid, Rusafa and Tisa Nissan (9 Nissan).

==== Joint Security Stations ====
The Joint Security Sites (JSS, also known as Joint Security Stations) were occupied by both the Iraqi Security Forces and Provincial Police. In some cases, Combat Outposts (COP) were enlarged to become JSS. On 12 April 2007, MG William Caldwell IV announced that fifty-four of the 75 outposts and stations were operating in the capital, and the number could rise to 102.

JSS were set up in the following neighborhoods:

- Sadr City
- Al-Za'franiya JSS
- Hurriyah JSS
- Ghazaliya JSS—completed March 2007
- Khansa JSS—completed August 2007
- Mansour district
  - Joint Security Station Mansour in the Jamia neighborhood of the Mansour district (completed March 2007)
- Karkh Muthana JSS
- JSS Torch (completed 19 April).
- Mushada JSS
- Yusufiyah JSS
- JSS "Arvanitis-Sigua" in Bayji 130 miles north of Baghdad, being completed May 2007.

=== February developments ===
On the second day of the operation U.S. and Iraqi forces pushed deeper into Sunni militant strongholds in Baghdad, mainly the Doura district in the south, where car-bombs were set off in their advance. In two incidents, car-bombs blew up as U.S. and Iraqi patrols passed and there were at least four civilian casualties. The operation began with very little resistance, and was hailed by Prime Minister Nouri al-Maliki as a "brilliant success". There was a steep decline in violence during the first few days, but American generals were more cautious about making judgments on its success early on, stating that the results will be seen over the course of months.

On 17 February, Iraqi Army spokesman Qasim al-Musawi announced that attacks and killings in Baghdad had already declined by 80%. He also added that the Baghdad morgue usually received 40-50 bodies per day but had received only 20 in the past 48 hours.

On 18 February, car bombings in a crowded market killed 63, which was the first major bombing since the security plan went in place. The insurgent counterattack continued the next day as bombs continued to go off in Baghdad and a U.S. post was destroyed by a bombing which killed two troops and wounded 29.

On 24 February, the Iraqi Prime Minister stated that 400 militants were killed in the operation which was contradictory to the statement given two days before by a senior Iraqi Brigadier, General Qassim Atta al-Mussawi, who said 42 militants were killed and 246 captured. On the same day the Prime Minister gave the statement, insurgents stormed a checkpoint near Baghdad International Airport, killing eight policemen. Also, two suicide bombers struck in Baghdad, one in the southern part killing one person and another outside the SCIRI compound killing three.

The next day a female bomber killed at least 41 and wounded 50 at Baghdad's Mustansiriyah University, while several Katyusha rockets simultaneously killed at least a dozen in a Shiite neighborhood and a bomb detonated near the Green Zone killing two and wounded a dozen civilians.

On 25 February, the Iraqi military announced that during heavy fighting in Baghdad, 13 Iraqi soldiers, including one officer, and 11 militants were killed and 219 militants were captured.

The next day a bomb under a podium where the Sunni Iraqi Vice President was making a speech exploded. The bombing happened in the Mansour district while Adil Abdul-Mahdi was talking to municipal officials. The bomb missed him by a minute as he had just finished the speech and left the podium. The explosion left Abdul-Mahdi injured and at least ten people dead.

=== March developments ===
On 3 March, insurgents captured Iraqi Lieutenant General Thamer Sultan. Sultan was working as an adviser to the Iraqi Defence Minister, and he himself was considered to take up that post in the coming months. Sultan, a Sunni, was a general during Saddam's era. He was rescued the next day when Iraqi agents stormed a house in western Baghdad where he was being held and four of his captors were arrested.

On 4 March, U.S. and Iraqi forces entered Sadr City, the primary stronghold of the Mahdi Army.

On 5 March, a suicide bomber killed 38 and wounded 105 civilians at a Baghdad book market.

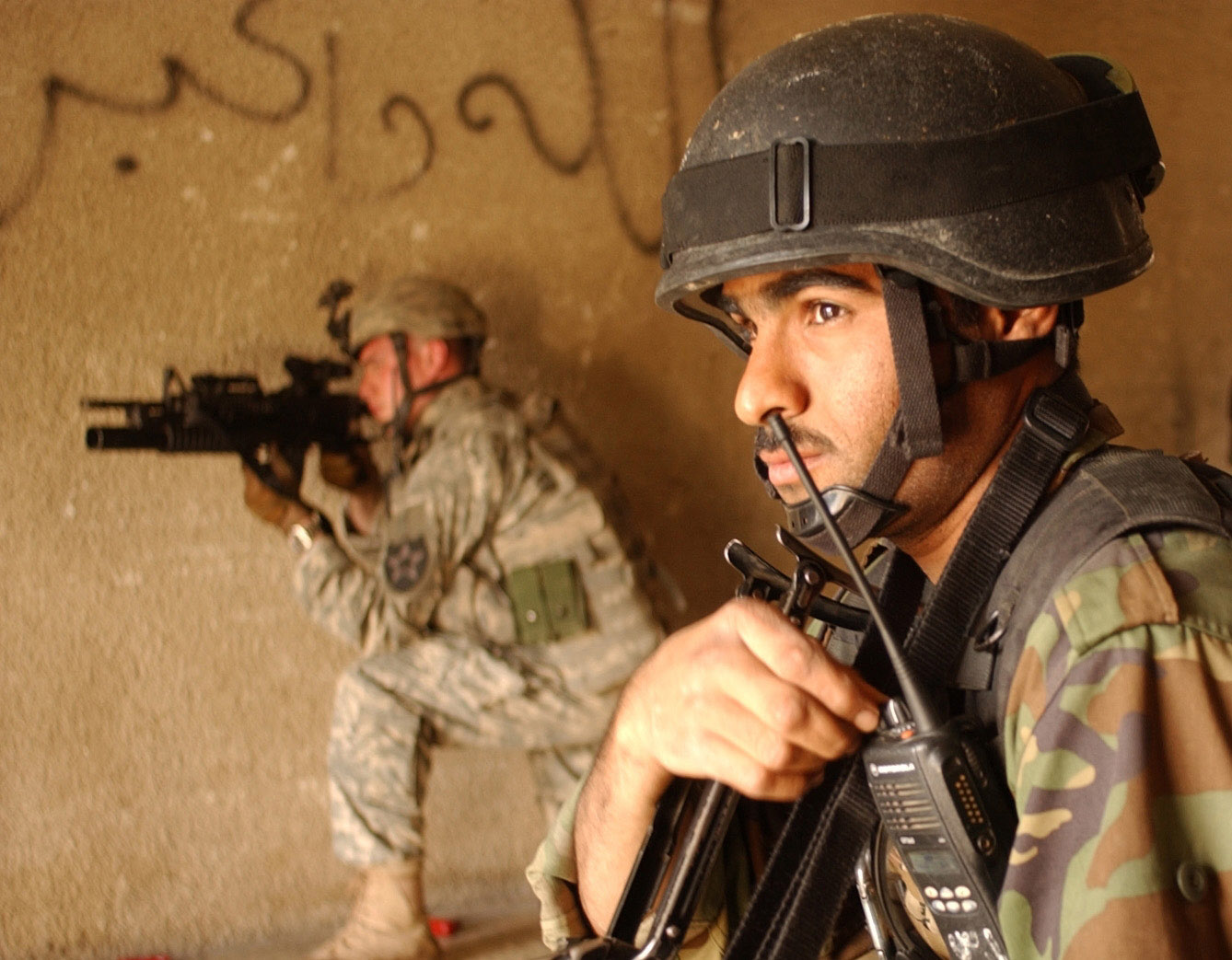
U.S. and Iraqi soldiers on patrol

On 7 March, the Pentagon issued an order that an extra 2,200 military police be sent to Baghdad because of the growing number of captured insurgents. The same day a suicide bomber attacked a police checkpoint in southern Baghdad killing 12 police commandos and 10 civilians.

On 8 March, General David Petraeus stated that: "There is no military solution to a problem like that in Iraq, to the insurgency of Iraq." He went on to say that a political solution was necessary in addition to the enhanced security operation in Iraq, and that the process of establishing peace would take months.

On 15 March, the Iraqi military said that since the start of the operation 265 civilians were killed in Baghdad in comparison to 1,440 the month before the start of the operation. Also they stated that there was significant reduction in assassinations and kidnappings, and the mortar attacks were down by 50 percent but roadside and car bombings remain at a high level. The Iraqi military said that "the statistics are key indications that the security crackdown is bearing fruit".

By 17 March a total of 15 joint US-Iraqi security stations were set up in Baghdad. Another 15 were planned to be built. Of the 15 that were built one was almost destroyed in an insurgent attack in the first days of the operation and another three are besieged by insurgents. On 21 March the Washington Post reported on the precarious conditions of many of the new outposts. The subsequent day several artillery rounds were fired into Al Malaki's office nearly striking the prime minister and the U.N. Secretary General Ban Ki-moon.

On 23 March, the deputy prime minister Salam al-Zubaie was seriously injured in a mosque suicide bombing. It was thought to be an inside job, like the attempt on the Vice President the previous month.

On 24 March, a massive suicide truck bombing completely destroyed a police station killing 33 police officers and wounding 44 others, including 20 policemen, in the Sunni insurgent stronghold of Doura. Heavy fighting continued the next day in the city with another 12 members of the Iraqi security forces killed and 26 more wounded, 6 insurgents were killed.

On 24 March, also, heavy mortar and rocket attacks opened up on the heavily fortified Green Zone. These attacks were some of the most sustained attacks on the Green Zone during the war. By 29 March, one American soldier and one American contractor were killed in the shelling and another 15 people were wounded, some seriously.

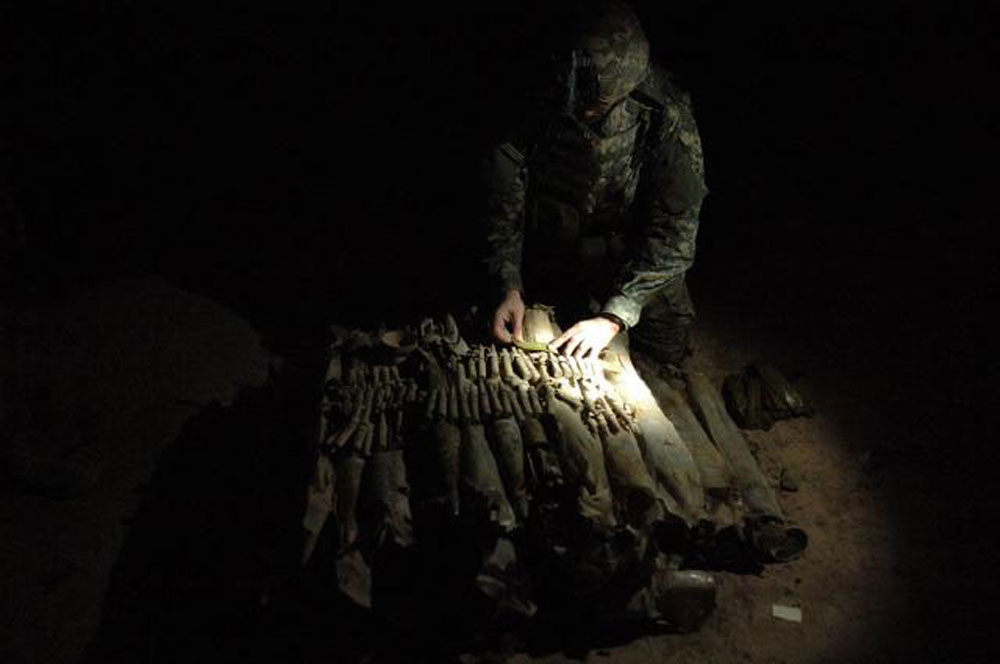
U.S. soldiers find a weapons cache 31 March 2007

=== Results by the end of March ===
By the end of March, despite claims by the Iraqi government that the situation was improving in Baghdad and the rest of the country as a result of the operation, Sunni insurgents continued to inflict massive casualties on Iraqi security forces and civilians, as well as U.S. forces with a constant rate of three soldiers dying per day for the past six months. During the month of March, more than 2,400 civilians were killed as well as more than 300 members of the Army and police forces in the whole country. However, over 1,000 suspected insurgents were captured and many weapons caches were discovered. The government stated that tens of thousands of Iraqis were returning to Baghdad and their old neighborhoods because the security situation had improved and the rate of families leaving the city also dropped from 350 to 25 families per day. But according to an article published by Newsweek, the situation on the ground was different: only a handful of Iraqi families had returned to their homes, and most of them had only done so because of payments from the Iraqi government. According to the Newsweek article, the government offered a bounty of 250,000 dinars to each family that returned to its home, and they also paid a small benefit to families who were displaced.

Only about 40% of the reinforcements were in place at this time. The U.S. command had stated that killings from death squads were going down notwithstanding the continued bombings. By the end of March, a total of 2,762 Iraqi civilians and policemen were killed, a small 3.6% decrease on the monthly death toll from before the crackdown, when 2,864 were killed.

U.S. military spokesman Maj. Gen. William Caldwell expressed disappointment at the high level of violence in Iraq despite a drop in the overall death toll in Baghdad during the U.S.-Iraqi security sweep that had entered its eighth week.

=== April developments ===
The month of April saw more intense fighting between U.S. forces and insurgents in and around Baghdad. The rebel cleric Muqtada al-Sadr called on his Mahdi Army to stop attacking the Iraqi security forces and redouble their efforts to attack American and other foreign forces. In the first nine days of April, 22 American soldiers were killed in fighting in and around Baghdad alone. In the whole country 43 American and 6 British soldiers were killed in the first nine days of April at a rate of around 5 soldiers per day.

10 April saw some of the most intense street fighting of the operation when U.S. and Iraqi troops encountered heavily armed Iraqi insurgents in the Fadhil district during a routine search operation. Apache attack helicopters were called in but most of them had to return to base because the anti-aircraft fire they received was too heavy. In the daylong battle that ensued 4 Iraqi Army soldiers, 14 insurgents and one child were killed, 16 American soldiers were wounded, including one Apache pilot, and three Apache and one Black Hawk helicopter were damaged enough that they had to return to base in mid-battle.

Two days later an insurgent suicide truck bomb attack destroyed the main bridge in north Baghdad's Waziriyah district. The bridge spanning over the Tigris River had been the primary transit point for United States vehicles operating in north Baghdad. On the same day insurgents managed to penetrate the extensive security and fortifications of U.S.-protected Green Zone and detonate a suicide bomb in the Iraqi parliament. The resulting blast killed one member of parliament, with seven more lawmakers being seriously wounded by the blast.

As the offensive entered its second month, on 12 April reports indicated that 1,586 civilians were killed in Baghdad since the start of the offensive which represented a sharp drop from the 2,871 civilians who died violently in the capital during the two months that preceded the security crackdown. However, various reports over the next twelve days indicated another rise in sectarian killings, beside the daily car bombings that have been taking a heavy toll on civilians since the start of the operation, with more than 540 civilians being killed in Baghdad.

Deaths outside of Baghdad increased as militants were flushed out of the city, with 1,504 civilians deaths reported compared with 1,009 deaths during the two months preceding the operation. Overall, the total reported civilian dead in Iraq decreased by about 20%.

On 16 April, cabinet members, who belonged to the Mahdi Army and held three ministries, quit the government on orders from al-Sadr, in response to growing insecurity in Baghdad and the refusal of al-Maliki's government to set a timetable for the American military withdrawal. The Maliki government said that this will not bring down the government and new replacements would be appointed who would work to unify the Iraqi people.

On 18 April, five massive car bombs, including two suicide bombers, exploded in mostly Shiite neighborhoods of Baghdad killing 198 people and wounding 251 others. The deadliest was in the mainly Shiite Sadriyah neighborhood in an attack on a market, which had already been hit by car bombs in previous attacks, where 140 people were killed and 148 were wounded. Prime Minister Nouri al-Maliki ordered the arrest of the Iraqi army colonel who was in charge of security in the area around the Sadriyah market. On the national level the Associated Press reported nearly 240 confirmed civilian fatalities making it the deadliest day since The Associated Press began recording daily nationwide deaths in May 2005. The Department of Defense said the following, "It's been a very bad day in Iraq, obviously, with the number of casualties that have taken place. ... But we've always said that there are going to be good days and bad days ahead. With respect to casualties, this had been a very bad day," according to their spokesman, Bryan Whitman.

On 25 April, the UN said that despite the initial drop in violence civilian deaths and violence in Baghdad had not dropped.

By the end of April more than 300 members of the Iraqi security forces, around 100 U.S. soldiers and around a dozen British servicemen were reported to have been killed in the whole country during that month.

=== May developments ===
On 2 May 2007 another U.S. military brigade with around 3,700 soldiers arrived in Baghdad as reinforcements.

On 3 May 2007 a heavy rocket barrage hit the fortified Green Zone killing four Filipino contractors working for the U.S. government. This happened after three straight days of rocket and mortar attacks on the Green Zone. Also, on the same day, Colonel B.D.Farris, commander of the 2nd Brigade Combat Team, 82nd Airborne Division, was wounded by small arms fire and taken out of action while conducting a survey of the barrier being built around a Sunni neighborhood on 1 May.

From 1 May 2007 to 11 May 2007 a total of 234 bodies were dumped around Baghdad, up 70.8 percent from the 137 bodies dumped around the capital during the first 11 days of April. It clearly showed that the Mahdi Army and the Shia death squads were back in action after the self-imposed ceasefire they went into with the start of the operation back in February.

On 18 May 2007 U.S. forces were involved in clashes in northern Baghdad in which they killed Azhar al-Dulaimi, the mastermind behind the Karbala raid in which five U.S. soldiers were killed by Iraqi insurgent commandos, four of which were first captured and then later executed.

By the end of May, 155 civilians were reported killed in the country during the whole month, 30 percent more than in April, around the same number as in March and an increase against 1,911 killed in January. Also more than 335 members of the Iraqi security forces and 125 coalition soldiers, all American except three, were killed in heavy fighting throughout the country.

=== Fighting in Babil province ===
Mid-April operations expanded south to the so-called "Triangle of Death" in Babil province that borders the southern part of Baghdad. In one month U.S. troops suffered heavy casualties during the fighting in Babil, including 20 killed and three captured, all later executed.

=== May and June Assessments ===
On 23 May, Secretary of Defense Robert Gates announced that as the surge troop strength reaches peak levels this summer, he expected the insurgents and terrorists in Iraq to accelerate their bombings and other attacks to influence US decision-makers to withdraw troops.

It was reported at the end of the month that the U.S. military was trying to get in touch with different elements of the insurgency in an attempt to negotiate a cease-fire. The U.S. military stated that the results of the "surge plan" will probably not be seen by September, in contrast with previous statements.

By 4 June 2007 the situation on the ground had reached a stalemate with the rate of violence on the rise. A United States Army assessment of the security plan through late May was released. The assessment found that due to logistical limitations and Iraqi security force infiltration, insurgents were able to successfully regain control of most security targets; the study found that American and Iraqi forces were able to "protect the population" and "maintain physical influence over" only 146 of the 457 Baghdad neighborhoods. Meaning only less than a third of Baghdad remained under coalition control. Coalition commanders blamed the setback on the high rates of desertions and mutinies among the United States backed Iraqi Security forces; noting that many members of the Iraqi Police were suspected of carrying out clandestine attacks on United States forces in cooperation with the Mahdi Army.

The evidence showing that the primary objective of Operation Law and Order was faltering was further compounded by a Pentagon quarterly report that showed that civilian deaths had increased after the operation: the number of daily civilian casualties after the surge had increased to an average greater than one hundred. Furthermore, the number of officially recorded insurgent attacks had reached an average of a thousand per week. More than 75 percent of the attacks were aimed at U.S. forces. The military reports showing that the key objectives of the surge had thus far failed were expected to increase United States congressional opposition to the already contentious troop surge strategy.

=== Operation Phantom Thunder ===
U.S. and Iraqi forces launched attacks on Baghdad's northern and southern flanks mid-June to clear out Sunni insurgents, al-Qaeda fighters and Shiite militiamen of the Mahdi Army who had fled the capital and Anbar during the four-month-old security operation. The U.S. wanted to take advantage of the arrival of the final brigade of 30,000 additional U.S. troops to open the concerted attacks. In the north an offensive was mounted against Al-Qaeda positions in Baquba in Diyala province where fighting had already been going on for months. In the south the push targeted insurgent forces in the Arab Jabour and Salman Pak area. Arab Jabour being only 20 kilometers southeast from Baghdad which was a major transit point for insurgent forces in and out of Baghdad. By the end of the first day of this new operation two U.S. soldiers and 30 militants were killed along with 12 civilians and more than 200 people were detained by coalition forces. Operation Phantom Thunder ended on 14 August with large swathes of insurgent held territory in the south, west, and east of Baghdad coming under coalition control. But despite that heavy fighting continued in Baghdad itself.

=== Results by the end of September ===
In late September 2007, the military released two reports highlighting successes of Operation Law and Order. On 20 September, the number 2 U.S. commander in Iraq, General Raymond Odierno, announced that Operation Law and Order had reduced violence in Baghdad by 50%. General Odierno also reported that car bomb and suicide attacks reached their lowest number in a year. This was followed by a report on 30 September that U.S. troop deaths had dropped dramatically in September to reach their lowest point since July 2006. According to Brig. General John Campbell, "With a decreasing number of attacks, you get less casualties." The military reports showing that the security situation as a result of the surge had thus far succeeded were not expected to decrease United States congressional opposition to the already contentious troop surge strategy. However, insurgents still had overall control of about 46 percent of Baghdad by 21 September.

=== Attack on the Polish ambassador ===
On 3 October, an attempt was made on the life of the Polish ambassador. Gen. Edward Pietrzyk was in a convoy en route to the embassy. The ambush was well planned. The convoy was hit with three roadside bombs and then the attackers opened fire. In the ensuing firefight the general was wounded with minor burns over 20 percent of his body, including his head and right arm and leg. Two civilians and one Polish soldier were killed and 11 people, including three soldiers, were wounded. In the end Blackwater helicopters arrived and evacuated the ambassador and his people. Three armored vehicles were destroyed.

=== Results by the end of November ===
In November 2007, Brigadier-General Qassim Moussawi, Iraqi spokesman for the nine-month-old Baghdad security plan, said the decline in violence would allow the government to reopen 10 roads that month that had been closed for security reasons. He also said that Baghdad would end the operation soon. These words came at the same time when Iraqi Prime Minister Nouri al-Maliki said that violence decreasing in the capital was a sign of declining sectarian bloodshed.

On 24 November, it was announced that 5,000 soldiers from the 3rd Brigade, 1st Cavalry Division would be withdrawn from Diyala province. With this the U.S. troop surge which began in February effectively ended, and with that the Baghdad security operation as well.

When the operation began mid-February the Coalition had less than 20 percent of Baghdad under its control. But, after months of heavy street fighting, the security in the city increased and attacks fell in November by 55 percent. Also, the sectarian fighting was diminished a great deal, with an average of 6 bodies being found in the city at the end of the operation, in contrast to at least 30 at the beginning in February. The U.S. and Iraqi military were still only managing to hold 40 percent of Baghdad in August when the tide turned after the Mahdi Army declared a cease-fire and large numbers of Sunni insurgent groups switched sides towards the Coalition. In the end only a small portion of the southern part of the city was left in the hands of Al-Qaeda in Iraq elements and the north-eastern, wast, Sadr city district remained under firm Mahdi Army control. Even if the operation ended there were still signs that the insurgency was not gone. A day before the operation ended, on 23 November, a bomb exploded in a pet market killing 15 civilians. The largest bombing in the city for the previous two months, because most of the heavy fighting had already ended mid-September. In all, around 7,500 civilians were killed during the operation along with more than 1,200 insurgents, almost 100 suicide bombers, and more than 870 members of the Coalition, including at least 324 U.S. soldiers. More than 1,000 U.S. soldiers were wounded during the operation. The intensity of the fighting during the operation can best be presented in that among the casualties were at least 4 Coalition generals. On 24 July, Iraqi Brigadier General Kamal Tahir was killed in the Al Kadhmiya district. Also, one American, one Iraqi and one Polish general were wounded.

== See also ==
- Iraq War troop surge of 2007
- Operation Phantom Thunder
- Operation Arrowhead Ripper
- Operation Commando Eagle
- Operation Together Forward
- Operation Marne Torch
- Coalition military operations of the Iraq War
- Iraq Military Operations 2003 to Current - Alphabetical
- Units under General Petraeus' command
