= Operation Commando Eagle =

2007 military operation in Iraq

- Part of the Iraq War (Operation Phantom Thunder)
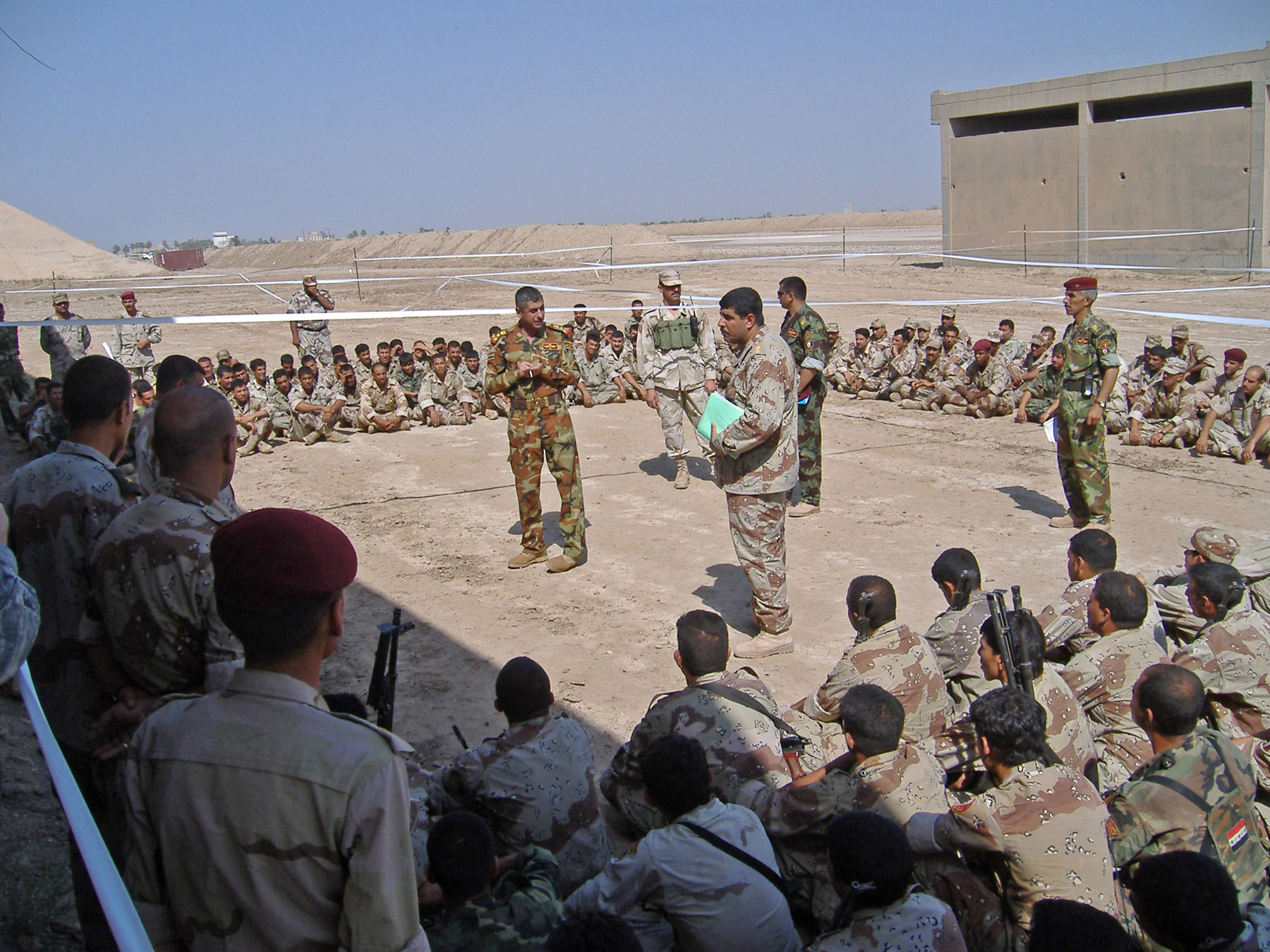
- Iraqi soldiers from the 6th Division are briefed during rehearsals for Operation Commando Eagle, a combined ground and air assault into an Islamic State of Iraq stronghold south-west of Baghdad, 19 June 2007.
| Date | 21 June 2007 – 14 August 2007 |
| Location | Iraq |
| Result | U.S. military raids successful; Disruption of insurgent supply lines |

Belligerents
| United States; New Iraqi Army | Islamic State of Iraq; Other Iraqi insurgents |

Strength
| Unknown | Unknown |

Casualties and losses
| 7 killed (U.S.), 18 killed (Iraqi security forces) | 12 killed, 33 detained |

Operation Commando Eagle was a 2007 military operation in the Iraq War. It began on 21 June 2007, when Iraqi and Coalition forces launched a combined ground and air assault operation against the Islamic State of Iraq and other extremist terrorists operating in the Mahmudiyah region of Babil province. The action was intended to curb terrorist activity southwest of Baghdad through a mix of helicopter assaults and Humvee-mounted movements.

== The operation ==
The operation targeted a series of houses which local citizens indicated were being used by Islamic State of Iraq cells to intimidate them and launch attacks against Iraqi and Coalition Forces.

On 21 June, troops of the 2nd Battalion, 14th Infantry Regiment, 2nd BCT, 10th Mountain Division detained three men when their truck was found to contain documents requesting rockets as well as a spool of copper wire, commonly used to build improvised explosive devices. Soldiers of the 2nd Battalion, 4th Brigade, 6th Iraqi Army Division found a large weapons cache, and soldiers of the 2nd Battalion, 15th Field Artillery Regiment, 2nd BCT, 10th Mountain Division discovered multiple series of caches during the operation.

Task Force 2-15 detained 16 individuals, and Company A, 4th Battalion, 31st Infantry Regiment detained nine men and Troop B, 1st Squadron, 89th Cavalry Regiment detained four, all wanted for terrorist attacks or for possessing illegal weapons.

== Military units involved ==
US forces reported to be involved were the 2nd Brigade Combat Team, 10th Mountain Division. Iraqi forces reported to be involved were the 4th Brigade, 6th Iraqi Army Division.

== See also ==
- Iraq War troop surge of 2007
- Operation Forsythe Park
- Operation Imposing Law
- Operation Phantom Thunder
- Operation Arrowhead Ripper
- Operation Marne Torch
- Coalition military operations of the Iraq War
- List of coalition military operations of the Iraq War
