= Baghdad Belts =

Baghdad Belts أحزمة بغداد
- Region
- Etymology: Named for its geographic belt-like formation around Baghdad
- Interactive map of Baghdad Belts
- Location in Iraq
- Country: Iraq
- Governorates: Baghdad Governorate, Saladin Governorate, Diyala Governorate, Babil Governorate, Wasit Governorate, Al Anbar Governorate
- Strategic significance: 2003 (not formally established; became relevant post-invasion)
- Approximate area spans multiple governorates
- Spread across multiple governorates; data not consolidated
- Time zone: UTC+3 (AST)
- The region played a major role in insurgent activity during the Iraq War.

The Baghdad Belts are the residential, agricultural and industrial areas, as well as communications and transportation infrastructure that encircle the Iraqi capital and connect it to other areas in Iraq. In the Iraq War, they were used by insurgents as staging points for operations in the capital.

== Location ==
The belts can be described as the provinces adjacent to the Iraqi capital and can be divided into four quadrants: northeast, southeast, southwest, and northwest. Beginning in the north, the belts include the Saladin Governorate, clockwise to Baghdad Governorate, Diyala in the northeast, Babil and Wasit in the southeast, and around to Al Anbar Governorate in the west.

== Iraq War, 2003–2011 ==
=== Strategic value ===
Between 2004 and June 2007, Al-Qaeda in Iraq and Shi'ite militias used locations in the Baghdad Belts to supply their combat operations in the capital. According to General Odierno, a top US commander in Iraq, "Attacks occurring in Baghdad often originate in these outlying regions." In 2006, US forces captured a map hand-drawn by then-al Qaida in Iraq leader Abu Musab al-Zarqawi, which showed Al Qaida placed a high priority on controlling the belts as a means of transporting weapons and fighters as well as providing bases in which to construct bomb-making factories.

=== Operation Phantom Thunder ===
Beginning in early 2007, the top US commander in Iraq, General David Petraeus, committed three of the five Surge brigades to the belts. In June 2007, as part of a country-wide offensive to secure the country, a number of operations were launched throughout the belts:

- West of Baghdad – US and Iraqi forces conducted operations around Lake Tharthar
- Northeast of Baghdad – Operation Arrowhead Ripper
- Southeast of Baghdad – Operation Marne Torch
- South of Baghdad – Operation Commando Eagle

== Iraq 2014 ==
During the offensive that the Islamic State of Iraq and the Levant launched against the Iraqi Government in June 2014, some US analysts speculated that the group's strategy was to follow Zarqawi's plan of capturing the Baghdad Belts area before laying siege to Baghdad.

Shiite militias and the Iraqi security forces have been accused of seeking to permanently purge Sunnis from the Baghdad Belt in order to create a majority Shiite territory that is separated from war-torn Sunni regions.
