= Arab Jibor =

Neighborhood in Iraq

Arab Jibor (or Jabour) is a neighborhood of Baghdad, Iraq. It is a predominantly Sunni area to the immediate south-east of Baghdad that lies to the west of the Tigris River. It has an estimated population of 120,000 of which 80% are Sunni. It is a fertile, rural area with many canals and difficult terrain. During the era of Saddam Hussein, many influential Sunnis, including Uday and Qusay Hussein, had weekend homes in the area.

Arab Jabour was a hotbed of the Sunni insurgency, with cells that supported al-Qaeda in Iraq networks in Baghdad. These cells operated until Coalition operations during the troop surge rooted them out during Operation Marne Thunderbolt, which concluded in February 2008.
