= 541st Regiment =

541st Regiment may refer to:

- 541st Coast Regiment, Royal Artillery
- 541st Parachute Infantry Regiment, United States
