= Elmer E. Fryar =

- Born: February 10, 1914; Denver, Colorado, US
- Died: December 8, 1944 (aged 30); Leyte, the Philippines
- Burial place: Remains not recovered; he is listed on the Tablets of the Missing at Manila American Cemetery, Manila, the Philippines
- Military career
- Allegiance: United States
- Branch: United States Army
- Rank: Private
- Units: 511th Parachute Infantry Regiment, 11th Airborne Division
- Conflicts: World War II
- Awards: Medal of Honor; Bronze Star; Purple Heart (2)

Elmer E. Fryar (February 10, 1914 – December 8, 1944) was a United States Army soldier and a recipient of the United States military's highest decoration—the Medal of Honor—for his actions in World War II.

== Biography ==
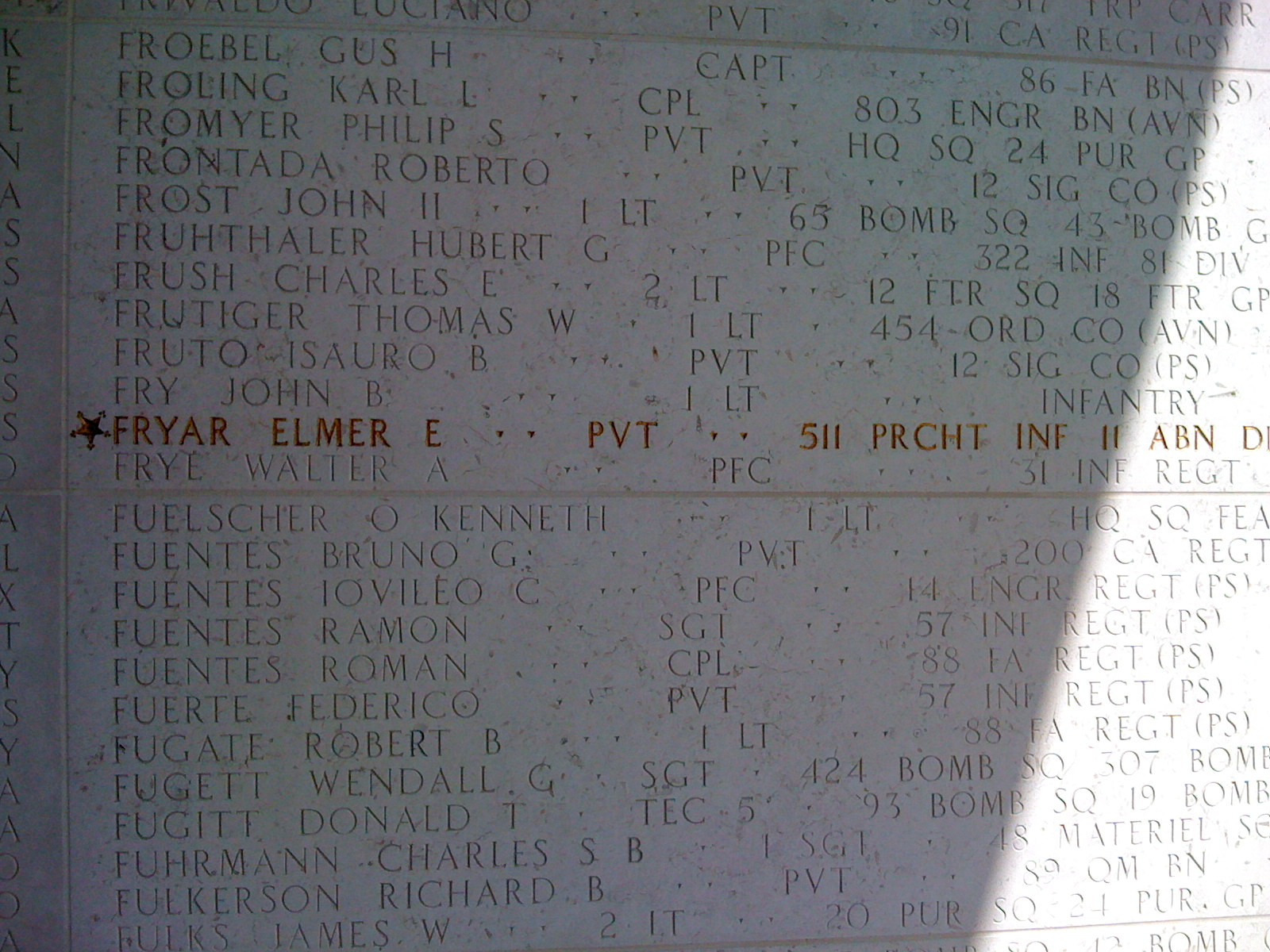
Fryar's name at Manila American Cemetery

At age 19, Fryar joined the Army from his birth city of Denver, Colorado, and served three years. After leaving service in the Army he joined the Marines for four years of service, returning to civilian life in Lakewood, Colorado until the U. S. became involved in World War II. He re-enlisted in the Army, and by December 8, 1944, was serving as a private in Company E, 511th Parachute Infantry Regiment, 11th Airborne Division. On that day, in Leyte, the Philippines, he single-handedly held off an enemy platoon which was trying to flank his company. Later, while helping a wounded soldier to the rear, he saw an enemy sniper aiming at his platoon leader. Fryar jumped forward and blocked the sniper's fire with his body. Although mortally wounded, he managed to kill the sniper with a hand grenade before succumbing. For these actions, he was posthumously awarded the Medal of Honor five months later, on May 9, 1945. Fryar's body was never recovered. He is listed on the Tablets of the Missing at Manila American Cemetery in Manila, the Philippines.

== Medal of Honor citation ==
Private Fryar's official Medal of Honor citation reads:

For conspicuous gallantry and intrepidity at the risk of his life above and beyond the call of duty. Pvt. Fryar's battalion encountered the enemy strongly entrenched in a position supported by mortars and automatic weapons. The battalion attacked, but in spite of repeated efforts was unable to take the position. Pvt. Fryar's company was ordered to cover the battalion's withdrawal to a more suitable point from which to attack, but the enemy launched a strong counterattack which threatened to cut off the company. Seeing an enemy platoon moving to outflank his company, he moved to higher ground and opened heavy and accurate fire. He was hit, and wounded, but continuing his attack he drove the enemy back with a loss of 27 killed. While withdrawing to overtake his squad, he found a seriously wounded comrade, helped him to the rear, and soon overtook his platoon leader, who was assisting another wounded. While these 4 were moving to rejoin their platoon, an enemy sniper appeared and aimed his weapon at the platoon leader. Pvt. Fryar instantly sprang forward, received the full burst of automatic fire in his own body and fell mortally wounded. With his remaining strength he threw a hand grenade and killed the sniper. Pvt. Fryar's indomitable fighting spirit and extraordinary gallantry above and beyond the call of duty contributed outstandingly to the success of the battalion's withdrawal and its subsequent attack and defeat of the enemy. His heroic action in unhesitatingly giving his own life for his comrade in arms exemplifies the highest tradition of the U.S. Armed Forces.

== Legacy ==
The Fryar Fieldhouse opened October 5, 2026, on Fort Wainwright, Alaska—joining the existing fitness center and aquatics facility in the Pvt. Elmer E. Fryar Fitness Complex. The world-class training campus supports year-round physical training, health and readiness for Soldiers of the 11th Airborne Division and other tenant units.

Fryar Drop Zone at Fort Benning

- The physical fitness center at Fort Wainwright in Fairbanks, Alaska, was named the Fryar Fitness Complex in June 2023.
- The parachute landing zone at Fort Benning, Georgia, used for training and graduating students in the U.S. Army Airborne School, is named in Fryar's honor.
- The football stadium on Fort Campbell, Kentucky, onetime home of Fryar's old 11th Airborne Division, also bears his name.
- There is also a U.S. Army Reserve training center named after him in his home state of Colorado.
- In Stadtbergen (near Augsburg/Germany) a street is named Elmer-Fryar-Ring". This street, formerly known as Fryar Circle, was the location of housing for U.S. Army officers during the stationing of U.S. forces in Germany.

== See also ==
- List of Medal of Honor recipients
- List of Medal of Honor recipients for World War II
