= 11th Airborne Division =

Airborne division of the United States Army

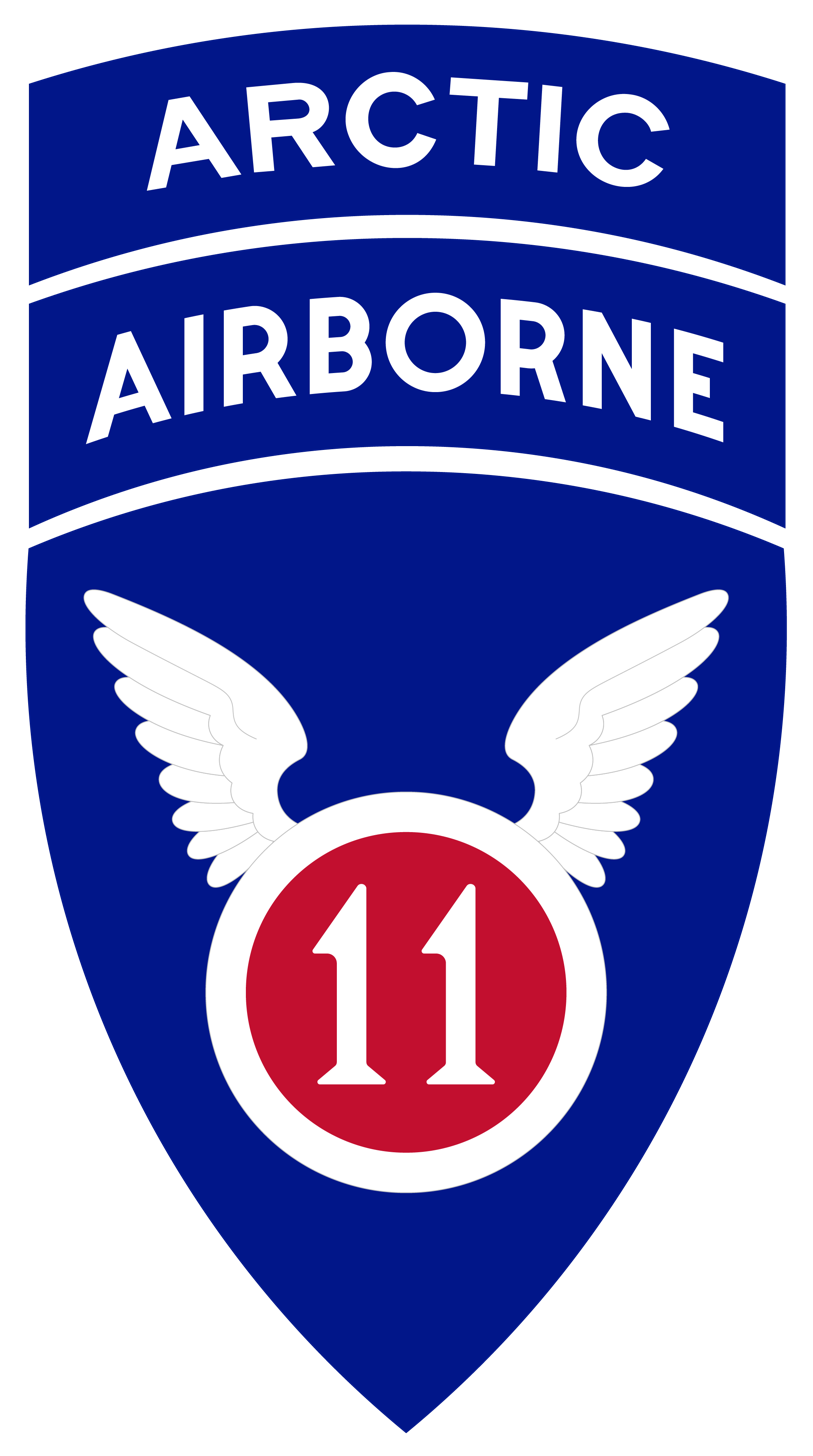
- Shoulder Sleeve Insignia
- Active: 12 November 1942–1 July 1958*; 1 February 1963–1 July 1965; 6 June 2022–present
- Country: United States
- Branch: United States Army
- Type: Light infantry Airborne forces
- Role: Air assault Cold-weather warfare Combined arms Maneuver warfare Urban warfare
- Size: Division
- Part of: I Corps; Alaskan Command
- Garrison/HQ: Joint Base Elmendorf-Richardson, Anchorage, Alaska
- Nicknames: "Arctic Angels" "Angels" (special designation) (hist.)
- Motto: "Americas Arctic Angels-Arctic Tough"'
- Colors: Maroon
- Engagements: World War II; New Guinea campaign; Philippines campaign; Leyte; Luzon with arrowhead; Battle of Manila (1945); Raid on Los Baños; Occupation of Japan; Korean War (187th Regimental Combat Team only)
- Website: 11thairbornedivision.army.mil

Commanders
- Commanding General: MG John Cogbill
- Command Sergeant Major: CSM David P. Hanson
- Deputy Commanding General, Support: BG Thomas E. Burke
- Deputy Commanding General, Operations: BGen Robert W. McBride (Canadian Army)
- Notable commanders: Maj. Gen. Joseph M. Swing; Lt. Gen. Ridgely Gaither; Maj. Gen. Wayne C. Smith

Insignia
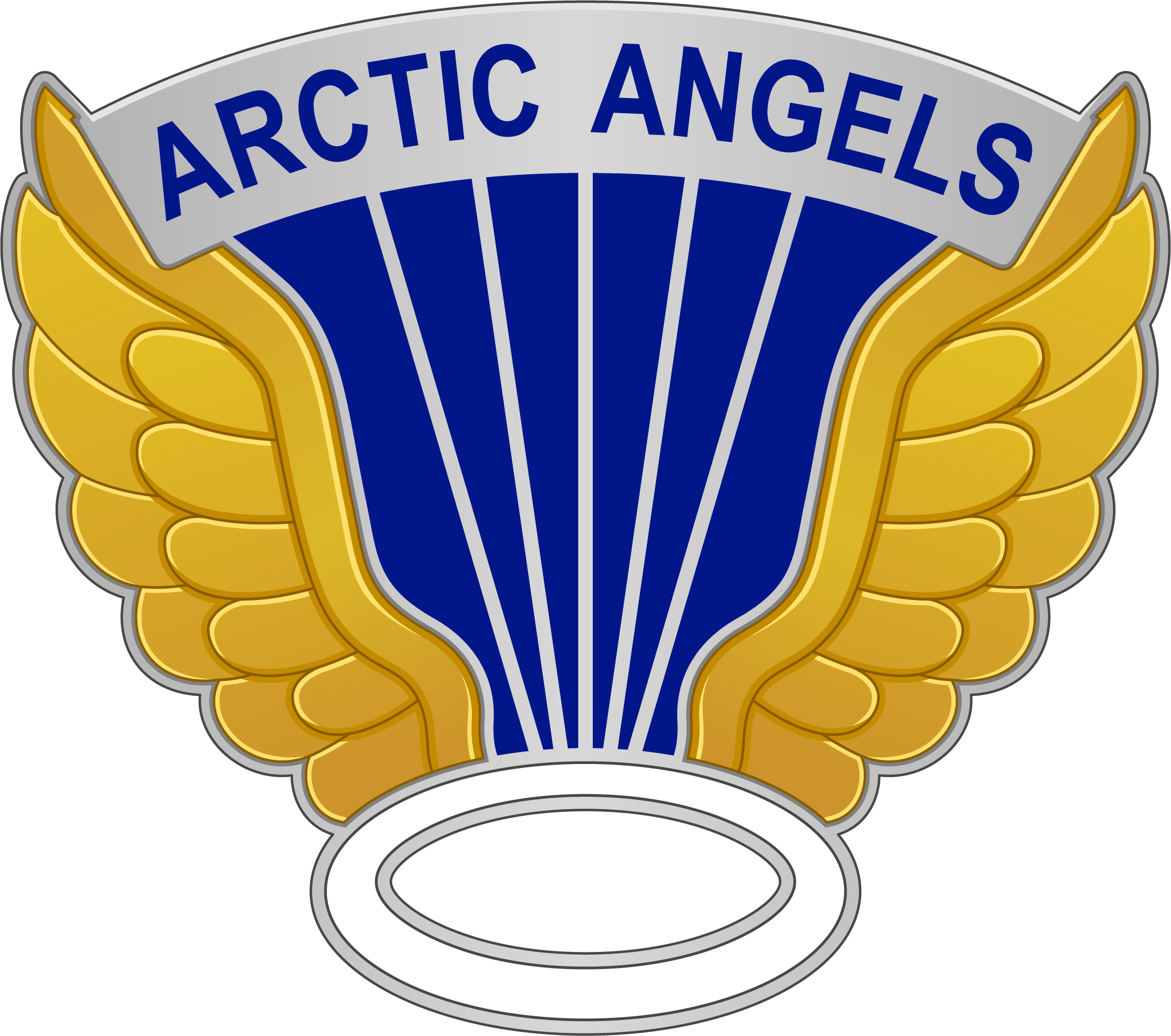
- Distinctive unit insignia

- 11th Airborne Division's WWII airborne background trimming (type 2)

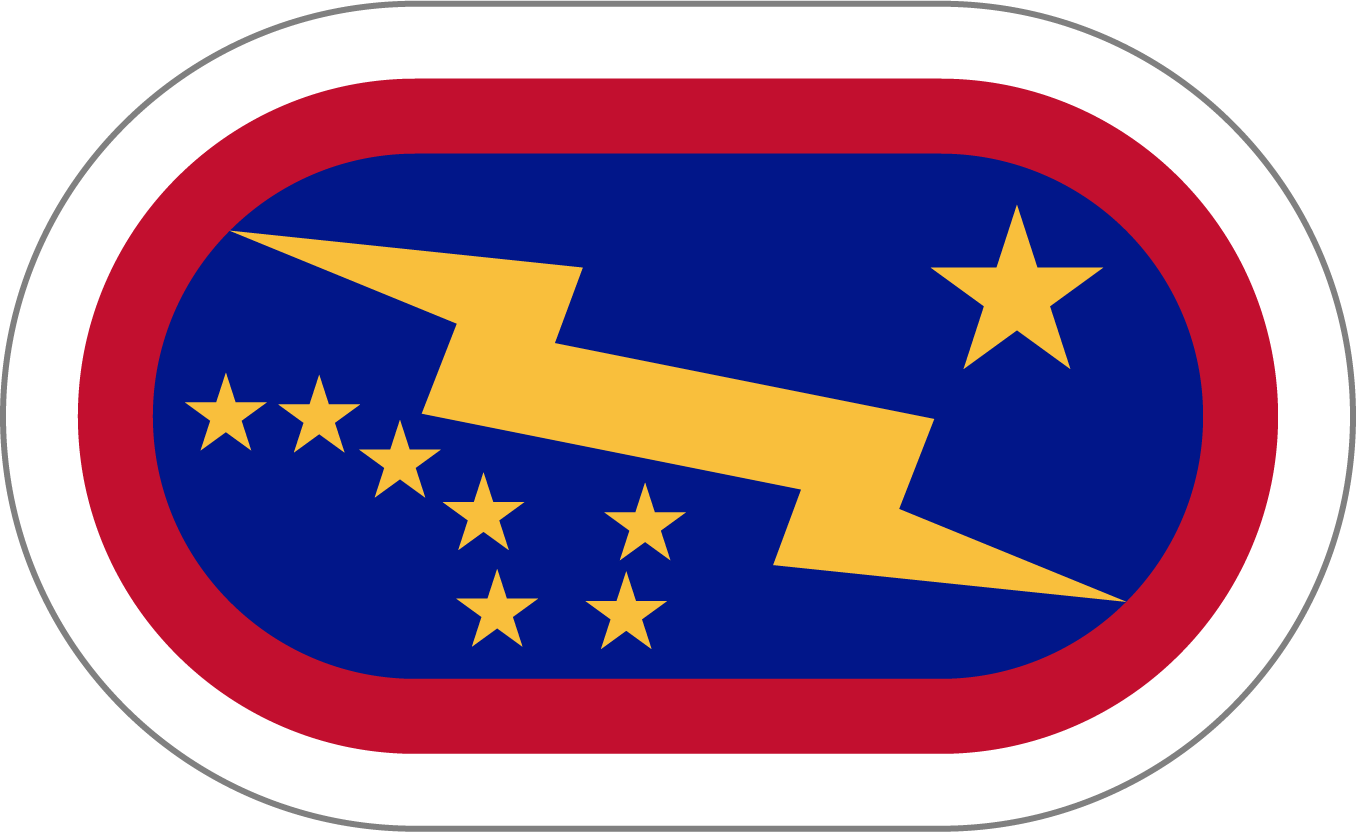
- Current 11th Airborne Division's trimming—an amalgamation of the division's WWII and U.S. Army Alaska trimmings

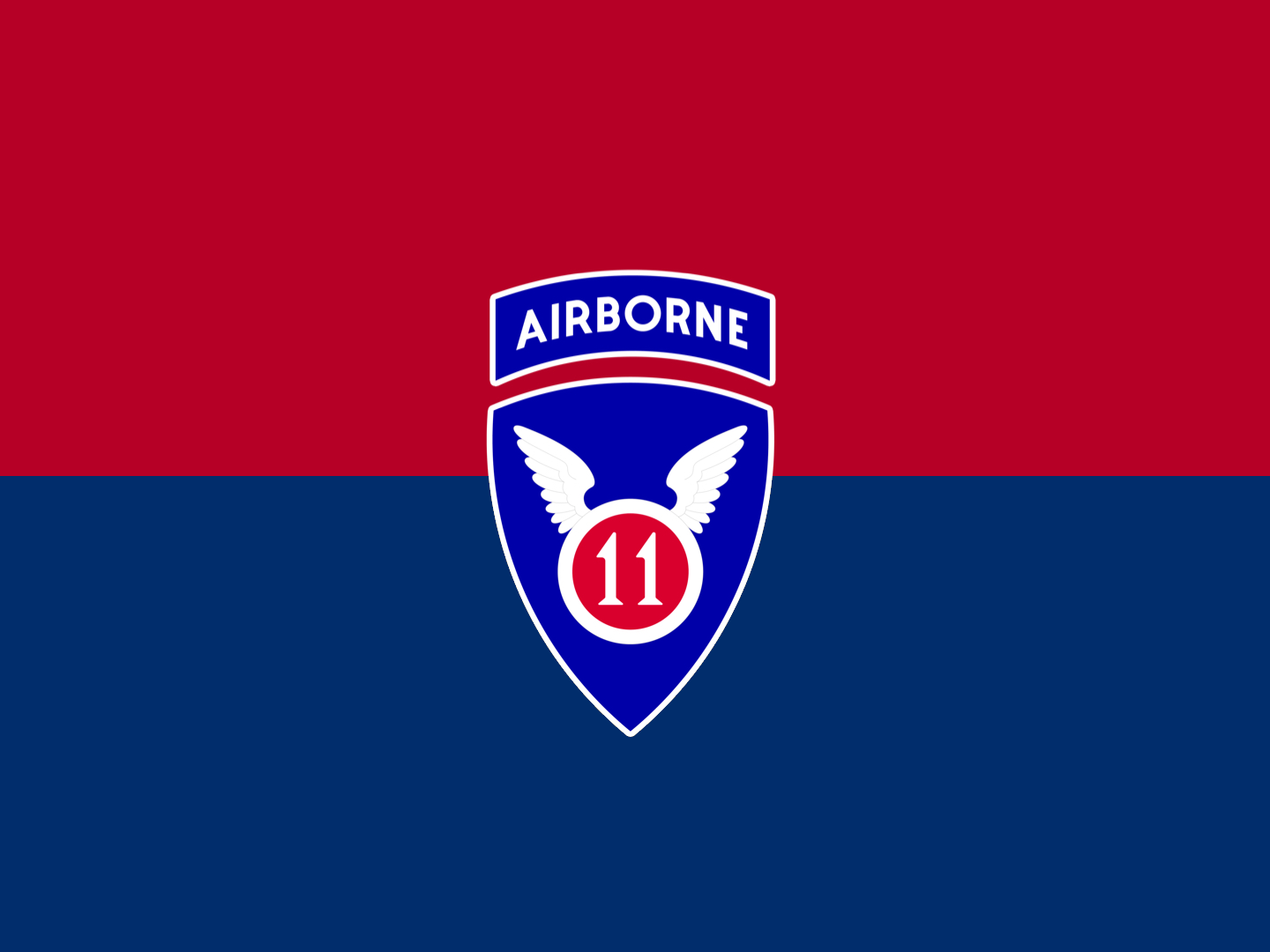
- Flag

The 11th Airborne Division ("Arctic Angels") is a United States Army multirole infantry division made up of specialized light infantry and airborne infantry based in Alaska.

Currently, this unit specializes in arctic warfare, airborne operations, combined arms, maneuver warfare, and urban warfare.

First activated on 25 February 1943, during World War II, it was held in reserve in the United States until June 1944 when it was transferred to the Pacific Theater where it saw combat in the Philippines. On 30 August 1945 the division was sent to southern Japan as part of the occupation force where it remained for four years. One parachute infantry regiment was detached for service in the Korean War. On 30 June 1958 the division was inactivated.

In the summer of 2022 the U.S. Army Alaska headquarters was redesignated as the 11th Airborne Division, and the two Brigade Combat Teams in Alaska, the 1st Brigade Combat Team and 4th Brigade Combat Team, 25th Infantry Division, were transferred to the 11th Airborne Division and redesignated as the 1st and 2nd Infantry Brigade Combat Team of the 11th Airborne Division.

== History ==
=== World War II ===
==== Formation ====
Inspired by the pioneering German use of large-scale airborne formations during the Battle of France in 1940 and later the invasion of Crete in 1941, the various Allied powers decided to raise airborne units of their own. One of the resultant five American and two British airborne divisions, the 11th Airborne Division, was activated in the Army of the United States on 25 February 1943 at Camp Mackall in North Carolina, under the command of Major General Joseph Swing. As formed, the division consisted of the 511th Parachute Infantry Regiment, the 187th Glider Infantry Regiment and the 188th Glider Infantry Regiment, and with a complement of 8,321 men was around half the strength of a regular U.S. infantry division of World War II.

The division initially remained in the United States for training, which in common with all airborne units was extremely arduous to befit their elite status. Training included lengthy forced marches, simulated parachute landings from 34-and-250-foot (10 and 76 m) towers, and practice jumps from transport aircraft; hesitancy in the doorway of an aircraft resulted in an automatic failure for the candidate. The washout rate was high, but there was never a shortage of candidates, especially because in American airborne units the rate of pay was much higher than that of an ordinary infantryman.

Before training was complete a debate developed in the U.S. Army over whether the best use of airborne forces was en masse or as small, compact units. On 9 July 1943, the first large-scale Allied airborne operation was carried out by elements of the U.S. 82nd Airborne Division and the British 1st Airborne Division in support of the Allied invasion of Sicily, code-named Operation Husky. The 11th Airborne Division commanding general, Swing, was temporarily transferred to act as airborne advisor to General Dwight D. Eisenhower for the operation and observed the airborne assault which went badly. The 82nd Airborne Division had been inserted by parachute and had suffered high casualties, leading to a perception that it had failed to achieve many of its objectives.

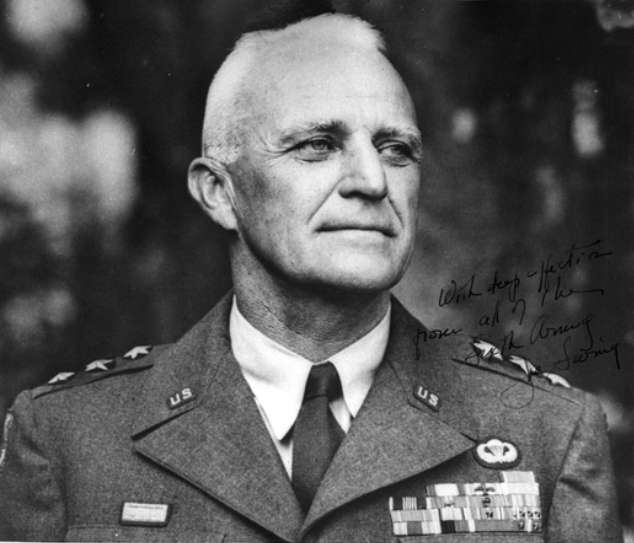
Lieutenant General Joseph M. Swing, commander of the 11th Airborne Division during World War II.

==== Swing Board ====
"I do not believe in the airborne division. I believe that airborne troops should be reorganized in self-contained units, comprising infantry, artillery, and special services, all about the strength of a regimental combat team [...] To employ at any time and place a whole division would require a dropping over such an extended area that I seriously doubt that a division commander could regain control and operate the scattered forces as one unit."

— The conclusion of General Eisenhower's review of the performance of American airborne forces during Operation Husky

Eisenhower reviewed the airborne role in Operation Husky and concluded that large-scale formations were too difficult to control in combat to be practical. Lieutenant General Lesley J. McNair, the overall commander of Army Ground Forces, had similar misgivings: once an airborne supporter, he had been greatly disappointed by the performance of airborne units in North Africa and more recently Sicily. However, other high-ranking officers, including the Army Chief of Staff George Marshall, believed otherwise. Marshall persuaded Eisenhower to set up a review board and to withhold judgement until the outcome of a large-scale maneuver, planned for December 1943, could be assessed.

When Swing returned to the United States to resume command of the 11th Airborne in mid-September 1943, he was given the role of preparing the exercise. McNair ordered him to form a committee—the Swing Board—composed of United States Army Air Forces (USAAF), parachute, glider infantry and artillery officers, whose arrangements for the maneuver would effectively decide the fate of divisional-sized airborne forces. As the 11th Airborne Division was in reserve in the United States and had not yet been earmarked for combat, the Swing Board selected it as the test formation. The maneuver would additionally provide the 11th Airborne and its individual units with further training, as had occurred several months previously in an earlier large-scale exercise conducted by the 101st and the 82nd Airborne Divisions.

==== Knollwood Maneuver ====
The 11th Airborne, as the attacking force, was assigned the objective of capturing Knollwood Army Auxiliary Airfield near Fort Bragg in North Carolina. The force defending the airfield and its environs was a combat team composed of elements of the 17th Airborne Division and a battalion from the 541st Parachute Infantry Regiment. The entire operation was observed by McNair, who would ultimately have a significant say in deciding the fate of the parachute infantry divisions.

The Knollwood Maneuver took place on the night of 7 December 1943, with the 11th Airborne Division being airlifted to thirteen separate objectives by 200 C-47 Skytrain transport aircraft and 234 Waco CG-4A gliders. The transport aircraft were divided into four groups, two of which carried paratroopers while the other two towed gliders. Each group took off from a different airfield in the Carolinas. The four groups deployed a total of 4,800 troops in the first wave. Eighty-five percent were delivered to their targets without navigational error, and the airborne troops seized the Knollwood Army Auxiliary Airfield and secured the landing area for the rest of the division before daylight. With its initial objectives taken, the 11th Airborne Division then launched a coordinated ground attack against a reinforced infantry regiment and conducted several aerial resupply and casualty evacuation missions in coordination with USAAF transport aircraft. The exercise was judged by observers to be a great success. McNair, pleased by its results, attributed this success to the great improvements in airborne training that had been implemented in the months following Operation Husky. As a result of the Knollwood Maneuver, division-sized airborne forces were deemed to be feasible and Eisenhower permitted their retention.

==== Leyte ====
Following the Knollwood Maneuver the 11th Airborne remained in reserve until January 1944, when it was moved by train from Camp Mackall to Camp Polk in Louisiana. After four weeks of final preparation for its combat role, in April the division was moved to Camp Stoneman, California and then transferred to Milne Bay, Papua New Guinea, between 25 May and 11 June. From June to September the division underwent acclimatization and continued its airborne training, conducting parachute drops in the New Guinea jungle and around the airfield in Dobodura. During this period, most of the glider troops became parachute-qualified making the division almost fully airborne. On 11 November the division boarded a convoy of naval transports and was escorted to Leyte in the Philippines, arriving on 18 November. Four days later it was attached to XXIV Corps and committed to combat, but operating as an infantry division rather than in an airborne capacity. The 11th Airborne was ordered to relieve the 7th Infantry Division stationed in the Burauen-La Paz-Bugho area, engage and destroy all Japanese forces in its operational area, and protect XXIV Corps rear-area supply dumps and airfields.

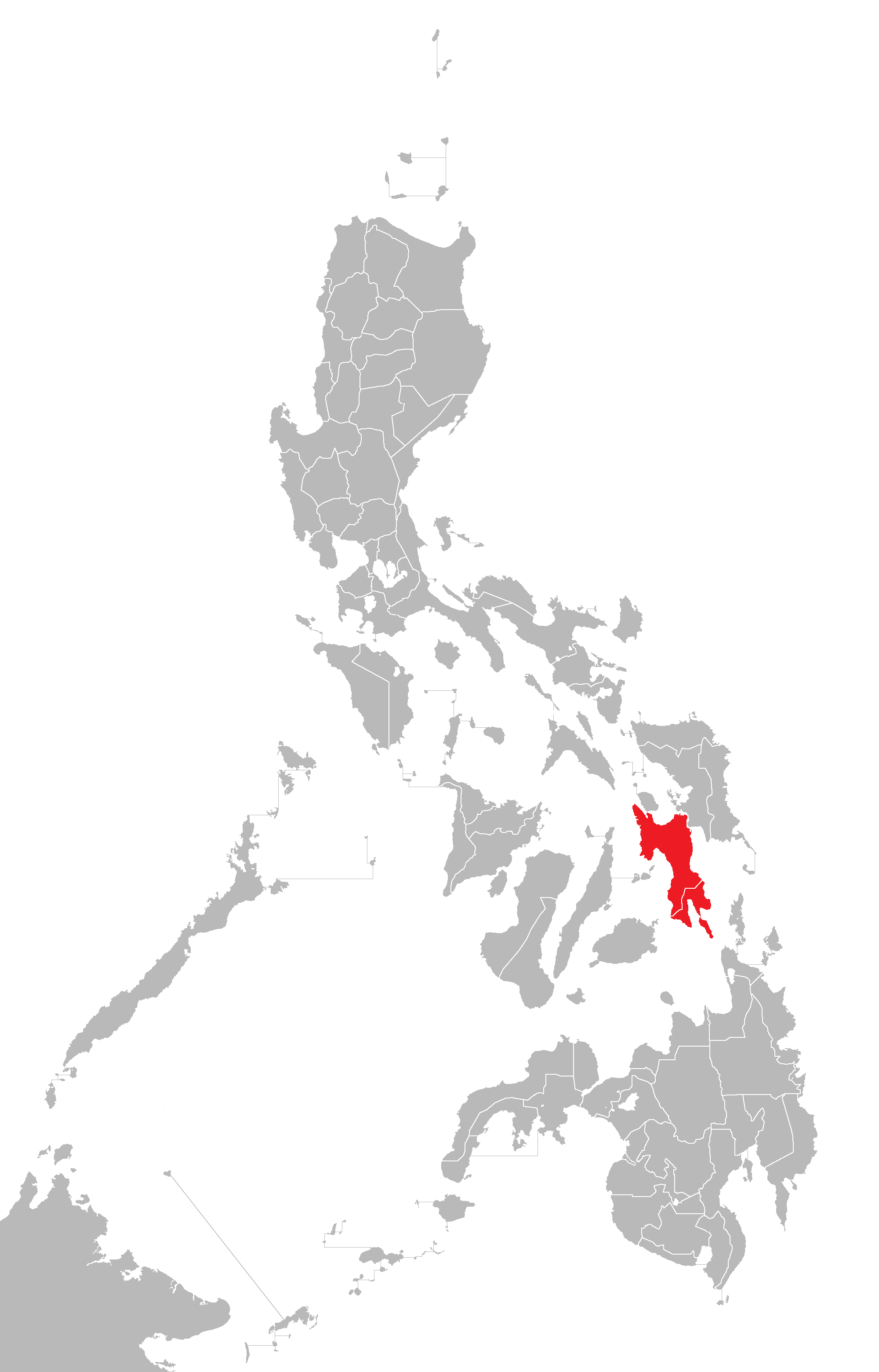
Map of the Philippines with Leyte highlighted

Swing ordered the 187th Glider Infantry Regiment (GIR) to guard the rear installations of XXIV Corps, while the 188th GIR was to secure the division's rear and conduct aggressive patrols to eliminate any enemy troops in the area. The 511th Parachute Infantry Regiment (PIR) was assigned the task of destroying all Japanese formations in the division's operational area, which it began on 28 November when it relieved the 7th Infantry. The 511th PIR advanced overland with two battalions abreast and the third in reserve, but progress proved slow in the face of fierce Japanese resistance, a lack of mapped trails and heavy rainfall (with more than 23 inches (580 mm) falling in November alone). As the advance continued resupply became progressively more difficult; the division resorted to using large numbers of Piper Cub aircraft to drop food and ammunition. Several attempts were made to improve the rate of advance, such as dropping platoons of the 187th GIR from Piper Cubs in front of the 511th PIR to reconnoiter, and using C-47 transport aircraft to drop artillery pieces to the regiment's location when other forms of transport, such as mule-trains, failed.

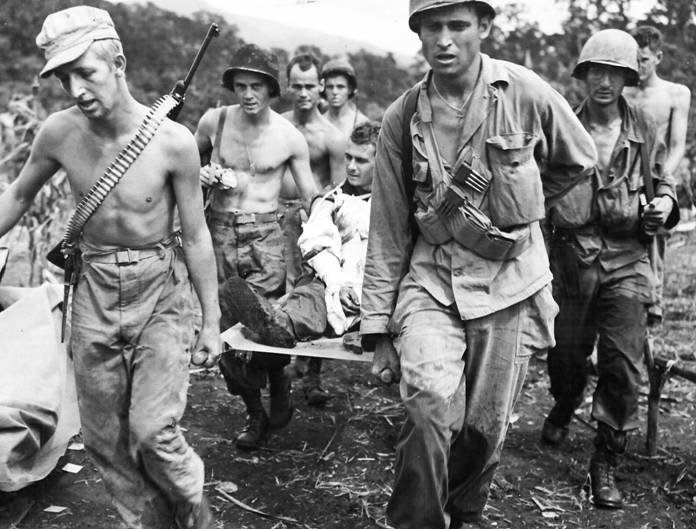
Troops of the 511th Parachute Infantry Regiment evacuate a wounded soldier to an aid station at Manarawat on the island of Leyte, December 1944.

On 6 December the Japanese tried to disrupt operations on Leyte by conducting two small-scale airborne raids. The first attempted to deploy a small number of Japanese airborne troops to occupy several key American-held airfields at Tacloban and Dulag, but failed when the three aircraft used were either shot-down, crash-landed or destroyed on the ground along with their passengers. The second, larger, raid was carried out by between 29 and 39 transport aircraft supported by fighters; despite heavy losses, the Japanese managed to drop a number of airborne troops around Burauen airfield, where the headquarters of 11th Airborne Division were located. Six L-5 Sentinel reconnaissance aircraft and one C-47 transport were destroyed, but the raiders were eliminated by an ad hoc combat group of artillerymen, engineers and support troops led by Swing.

The 511th PIR was reinforced by the 2nd Battalion, 187th GIR, and continued its slow but steady progress. On 17 December it broke through the Japanese lines and arrived at the western shoreline of Leyte, linking up with elements of the 32nd Infantry Division. It was during this period that Private Elmer E. Fryar earned a posthumous Medal of Honor when he helped to repel a counterattack, personally killing twenty-seven Japanese soldiers before being mortally wounded by a sniper. The regiment was ordered to set up temporary defensive positions before being relieved on 25 December by the 1st Batt., 187th GIR, and the 2nd Batt., 188th GIR, who would themselves incur considerable casualties against a heavily dug-in enemy. The 511th PIR was reassembled at its original base-camp in Leyte on 15 January 1945.

==== Luzon ====
On 22 January the division was placed on alert for an operation on the island of Luzon, to the north of Leyte. Five days later the 187th and 188th Glider Infantry Regiments were embarked for Luzon by sea, while the 511th Parachute Infantry Regiment flew by C-46 Commando transport aircraft to Mindoro. At dawn on 31 January the 188th GIR led an amphibious assault near Nasugbu, in southern Luzon. Supported by a short naval barrage, A-20 Havoc light bombers and P-38 Lightning fighter aircraft, a beach-head was established in the face of light Japanese resistance. The regiment moved rapidly to secure Nasugbu, after which its 1st Battalion advanced up the island's arterial Highway 17 to deny the Japanese time to establish defenses further inland. The 2nd Battalion moved south, crossing the River Lian and securing the division's right flank. By 10:30 elements of the 188th had pushed deep into southern Luzon, creating the space for the 187th GIR to come ashore. The 188th's 2nd Battalion was relieved and the regiment continued its advance, reaching the River Palico by 14:30 and securing a vital bridge before it could be destroyed by Japanese combat engineers.

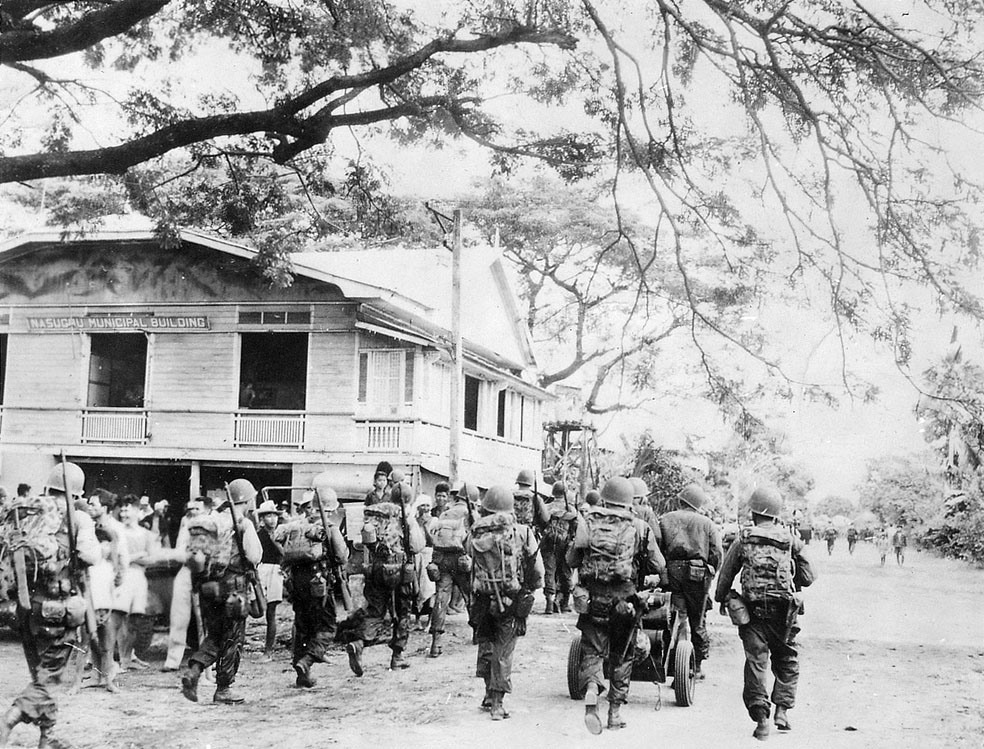
Troops of the 188th Glider Infantry Regiment make their way through the town of Nasugbu on the island of Luzon, 31 January 1945.

Following Highway 17 to Tumalin, the regiment began to encounter heavier Japanese resistance. At midnight the 187th took over the lead and the two glider infantry regiments rested briefly before tackling the main Japanese defensive lines. These consisted of trenches linked to bunkers and fortified caves, and were manned by several hundred infantry with numerous artillery pieces in support. At 09:00 on 1 February the glider infantry launched their assault, and by midday had managed to break through the first Japanese position; they spent the rest of the day conducting mopping up operations. On the morning of 2 February the second line was breached, and by midnight the 188th had broken a third. The divisional reconnaissance platoon was now in the vicinity of Tagaytay Ridge, the intended site of the 511th Parachute Infantry Regiment's first combat drop.

The 511th's airborne operation had originally been scheduled for 2 February, but with Swing's insistence that the drop was only to go ahead if his ground forces were in range to offer support, the dogged Japanese resistance encountered delayed the operation. With only 48 C-47s available, the 511th was forced to deploy in three waves. The regimental staff, the 2nd Battalion and half of the 3rd Battalion would drop first, the rest of the regiment would arrive in the second lift, and the 457th Parachute Field Artillery Battalion would drop in the third.

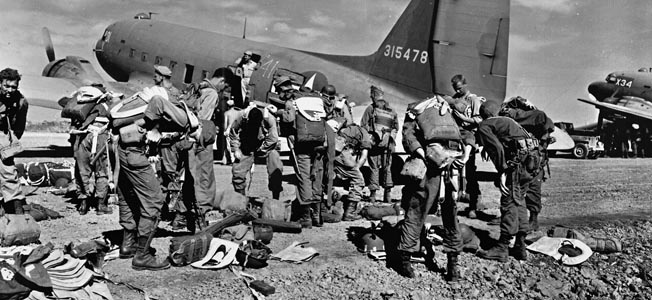
Paratroopers of the 511th Parachute Infantry Regiment prepare for their combat jump on Tagaytay Ridge, 3 February 1945.

At 03:00 on 3 February the troops of the first lift entered their transport planes, and at 07:00 the first transports left Mindoro. Protected by an escort of P-61 Black Widow night fighters, on arriving over Luzon they followed Highway 17 to Tagaytay Ridge. The ridge itself was an open space some two thousand yards (1,800 m) long and four thousand yards (3,700 m) wide, plowed in places, and had been largely cleared of Japanese troops by local Filipino soldiers and recognized guerrillas. At 08:15 the first echelon of the first lift, approximately 345 men, successfully parachuted into the drop zone. The second echelon, consisting of approximately 570 men, were dropped prematurely and landed about eight thousand yards (7,300 m) to the east. The next lift also encountered problems, with 425 men dropping correctly but another 1,325 dropping early due to pilot error and poor jump discipline. However, the entire regiment was assembled within five hours of the first landings. After overcoming minor Japanese resistance, by 15:00 the 511th had made contact with the 188th and 187th, and the entire division was once again assembled as a single formation. The ridge having been cleared of its remaining defenders, the division began to advance towards Manila, with the national highway in Silang, Dasmarinas, Imus and Bacoor where cleared by Fil-American Cavite Guerilla Forces FACGF under General Mariano Castaneda and reaching the Paranaque River by 21:00. The city was protected by the Genko Line, a major Japanese defensive belt that stretched along Manila's southern edge. The line consisted of approximately 1,200 two- to three-story deep blockhouses, many of which emplaced naval guns or large-caliber mortars. Entrenched heavy anti-aircraft weapons, machine-gun nests and booby-traps made of naval bombs completed the defenses, which were manned by around 6,000 Japanese soldiers.

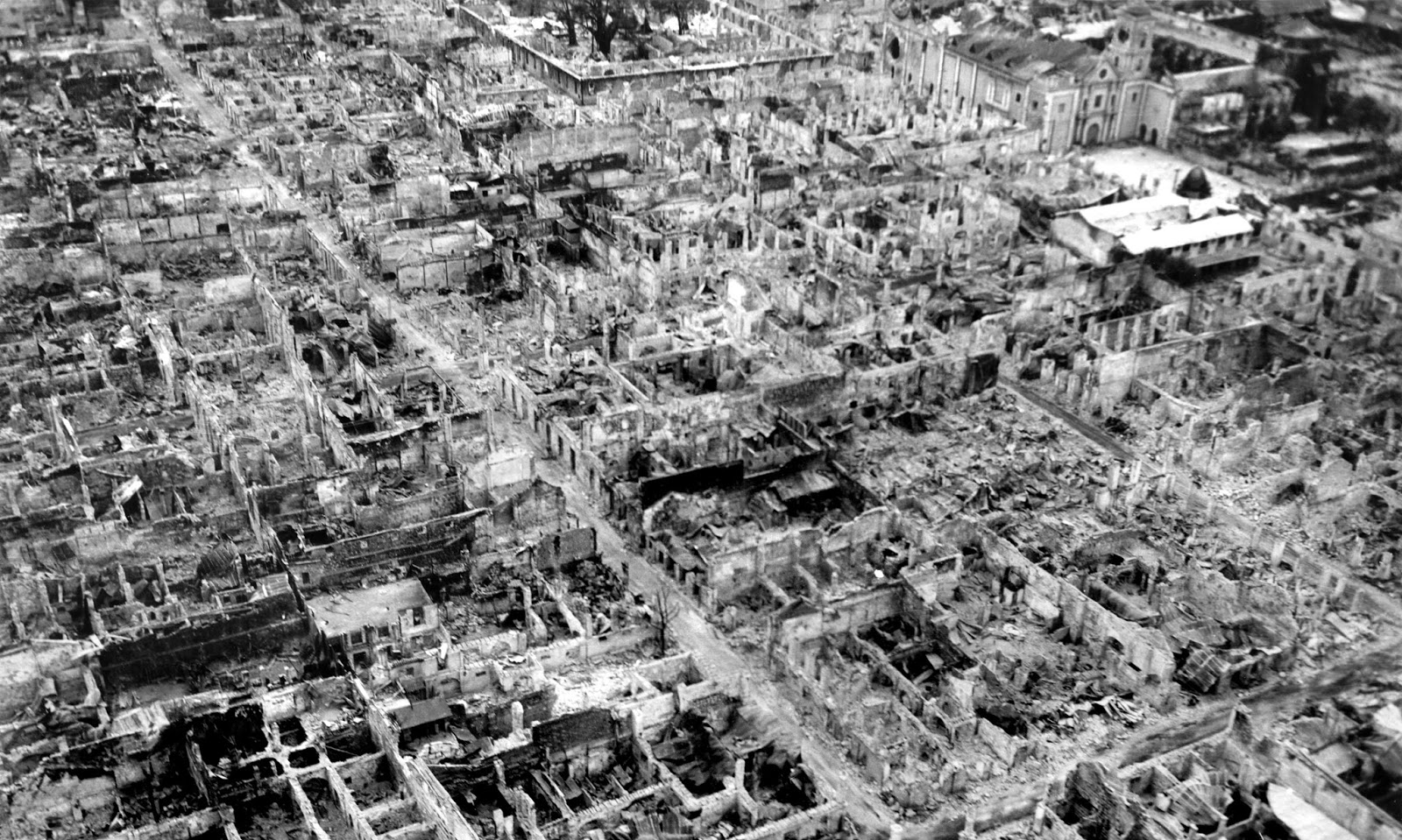
An aerial view of the walled city of Intramuros after the Battle of Manila, May 1945

The 11th Airborne Division was ordered to breach the Genko Line and drive into Manila, where it would link up with other American forces attacking the city from the north. All three regiments were committed to the assault. During the advance on Manila, the division's Chief of Staff, Colonel Irvin R. Schimmelpfennig III, was killed by Japanese small arms fire on 4 February and posthumously awarded the Distinguished Service Cross. Spearheading the division's attack on 5 February, the 511th overcame fierce resistance and broke the crust of the Japanese position, but was soon relieved by the 188th. As the glider regiment took up the push westwards in the face of heavy opposition, the 511th changed their axis of advance and attempted to move into the city from the south.

By 11 February, the division had penetrated as far as Nichols Field, an airfield that formed the center of the Genko Line. This was heavily fortified with a number of entrenched naval guns and a series of bunkers; after a short artillery bombardment on the morning of 12 February, the 187th's 2nd Battalion attacked the airfield's north-west corner while the 1st Battalion and the entire 188th regiment moved in from the south and south-eastern corners. This pincer movement succeeded in taking the airfield and, despite a local counter-attack, by nightfall the position was secured. The following day the division thrust towards Fort William McKinley, the headquarters of Rear Admiral Sanji Iwabuchi, commander of the Japanese defenders on Luzon. During this advance Private First Class Manuel Perez Jr. neutralized several Japanese bunkers which were impeding the division's progress, capturing one single-handedly and killing eighteen Japanese soldiers. Perez was killed by a sniper a month later in South Luzon, and posthumously awarded the Medal of Honor.

On 15 February, the 1st Battalion of the 187th, alongside other American units, launched an attack on Mabato Point. This was an extremely heavily fortified position featuring the same defensive measures as the Genko Line, and it would take six days of hard fighting, multiple airstrikes, and the frequent use of napalm and heavy artillery, before the point was secured. Meanwhile, having taken heavy casualties on its approach to Fort McKinley—particularly when the Japanese detonated a quantity of buried naval depth charges—on 17 February the rest of the 11th Airborne Division assaulted the fort. The 511th led the break-in, and by 18 February the area had been cleared of its defenders. Sporadic fighting continued in Manila until 3 March, when all organized Japanese resistance ended. The commander of the 511th, Colonel Orin D. "Hard Rock" Haugen, died of shrapnel wounds sustained during the battle of Manila on 22 February.

==== Raid at Los Baños ====
A large number of civilian prisoners had been detained by the Japanese on Luzon, mostly in internment camps scattered throughout the island. The largest of these was located on the campus of the Agricultural College of the Philippines at Los Baños, some 40 miles (64 km) south-east of Manila. General Douglas MacArthur had tasked the 11th Airborne Division with rescuing the Los Baños internees on 3 February, but the division's ongoing combat operations around the Genko Line left it unable to divert any resources at that time. All that could be accomplished during February was to gather information, primarily through liaison with the guerilla groups operating in Southern Luzon and around Los Baños. Swing and his command staff were briefed daily by the officer working with the guerilla groups, Major Vanderpool. From the guerillas and a few civilians that had escaped the camp, Vanderpool established that it was surrounded by two barbed-wire fences approximately six feet tall. Several guard towers and bunkers dotted its perimeter, each containing at least two guards. Prisoners left each morning under armed guard to gather food supplies and firewood from a nearby town. Vanderpool was informed that the camp's population consisted of American civilians in three distinct groups: Protestant missionaries and their families; Roman Catholic nuns and priests; and professional workers such as doctors and engineers, and their families. The latter group included several hundred women and children. While all the inmates appeared to be in good health, many had become weak from food rationing.

On 20 February, Swing was finally able to release sufficient troops for a raid on the Los Baños camp, and a four-phase plan was devised by Vanderpool and the divisional staff officers. The divisional reconnaissance platoon would travel across a nearby lake and move to the outskirts of the camp, securing a large adjacent field as the drop zone for a company of paratroopers. Having landed, the paratroopers would eliminate Japanese resistance in the area, secure the camp, and prepare for its evacuation. Fifty-four amphibious Amtracs would transport two additional companies of paratroopers to the lake shore, where a beachhead would be established while the Amtracs continued to the camp to evacuate its occupants. Simultaneously, a task force consisting of a reinforced infantry battalion, two battalions of heavy artillery and a tank destroyer battalion would advance down Highway 1 towards Los Baños to interdict any Japanese attempts to interfere.

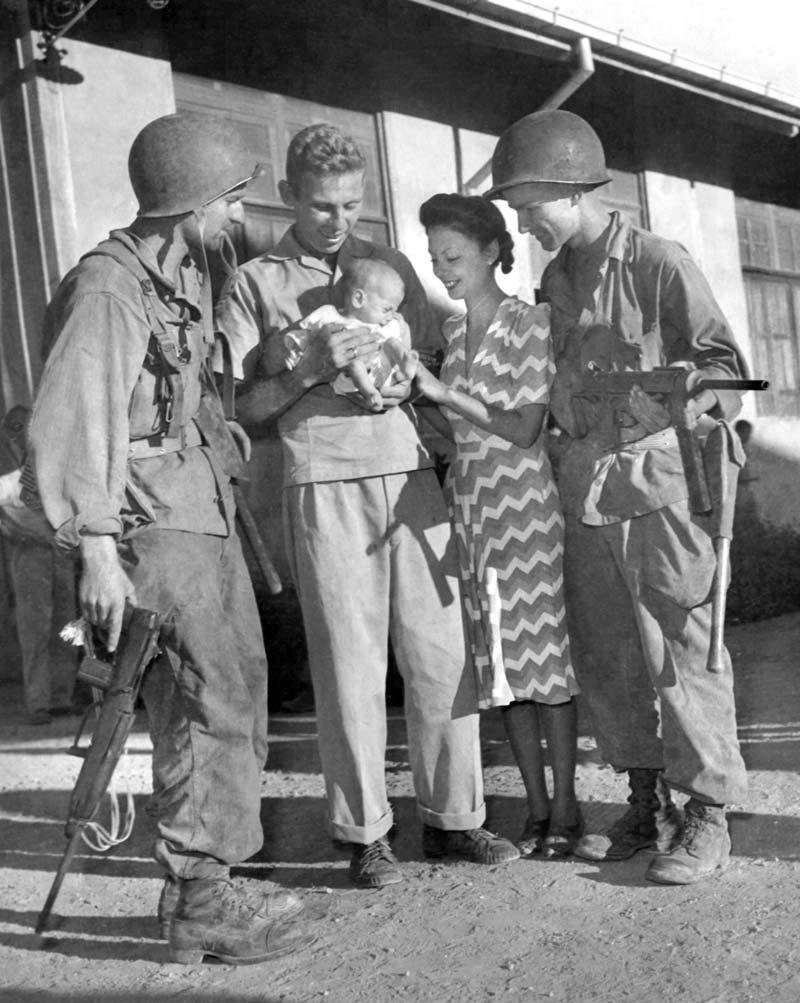
Los Baños internees with 11th Airborne paratroopers after the raid, 23 February 1945.

Assisted by a group of guerrillas, on the night of 21 February the divisional reconnaissance platoon made their way to the lake and collected ten canoes. Despite navigational difficulties, the platoon came ashore near Los Baños at 02:00 the following morning, and after securing the paratroopers' drop zone, concealed themselves in the jungle near the camp. During the afternoon B Company of the 1st Battalion, 511th PIR was transferred to the airfield from which they would be deployed, while the rest of the battalion rendezvoused with the Amtrac convoy. At 07:00 on the morning of 23 February, B Company took off in ten C-47s, arriving over their drop zone shortly afterwards. As the first paratroopers landed, the reconnaissance platoon and the supporting guerilla fighters opened fire on the camp's defences, using bazooka rounds to penetrate the concrete pillboxes, and then entered the camp to engage its garrison. The paratroopers soon joined the battle, and by 07:30 the Japanese guards had been overcome and the internees were being rounded up and readied for evacuation. At the lakeshore the 511th's other two companies had secured their beachhead, and the convoy of Amtracs reached the camp without incident. Priority during loading was given to the women, children and wounded; some of the able-bodied men walked alongside the Amtracs as they returned to the beach. The first evacuation convoy left the camp at approximately 10:00, with B Company, the reconnaissance platoon and the guerrillas remaining behind to provide a rearguard. By 11:30 all of the civilians had been evacuated, and at 13:00 the Amtrac convoy returned for the rearguard, with the last paratroopers leaving the beach at approximately 15:00. Meanwhile, on Highway 1, the taskforce that had been deployed to protect the operation met heavy Japanese resistance and suffered several casualties, but was able to block Japanese forces that advanced on the camp, before retreating to American lines. The raid had been a complete success, liberating 2,147 civilians.

==== Southern Luzon and Aparri ====
On the day that the Los Baños internees were freed, the headquarters of Sixth United States Army assigned the 11th Airborne Division the task of destroying all Japanese formations in southern Luzon, south of Manila. The bulk of the division moved south the following day, with the 187th GIR and the 511th PIR advancing abreast. The 188th GIR was detached from the main advance by Swing; it was to eliminate all Japanese units still operating in the Pico de Loro hills along the southern shore of Manila Bay. These forces belonged to the 80,000-strong Shimbu Group, one of three groups of the Japanese Fourteenth Area Army under General Tomoyuki Yamashita. It would take until the end of April for the 11th Airborne Division—often acting in conjunction with Filipino soldiers, the recognized guerillas and elements of the 1st Cavalry Division—to subdue the Shimbu Group. Conducting combat operations was extremely difficult in the mountainous terrain, and many Japanese units elected to fight to the death rather than surrender. However, all organized resistance in southern Luzon ended on 1 May, when the division captured Mount Malepunyo near the city of Lipa. The 11th Airborne established a base centered around the former Japanese airstrip on the outskirts of Lipa, the runway of which was lengthened by the 127th Airborne Engineer Battalion to accommodate C-47s. Once the engineering work was completed, the division's combat troops participated in several refresher-training courses.

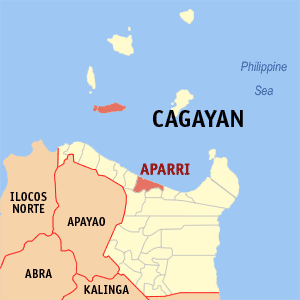
Map of Cagayan showing the location of Aparri

The 11th Airborne's next operation took place on 23 June in the province of Aparri in northern Luzon. By this time the only Japanese forces remaining on the island were positioned to the far north and belonged to the 52,000-strong Shobu Group. This last of General Yamashita's three groups proved to be the most tenacious, forcing Lieutenant-General Walter Krueger, commander of the Sixth United States Army, to commit four infantry divisions, an armored task force and a large band of the Filipino recognized guerrillas. While these forces pinned down the Japanese, the 37th Infantry Division began an advance northwards, defeating a weaker formation and encircling the main Japanese force. To ensure the success of the 37th's drive, Krueger called for an airborne force to land near Aparri and move southwards to meet the advancing 37th.

The 11th Airborne Division was to drop a battalion-sized combat team on Camalaniugan Airfield, approximately ten miles (16 km) south of Aparri. It would then advance southwards, eliminating all Japanese resistance, until it linked up with the leading elements of the 37th Infantry Division. To accomplish this Swing formed a special unit–Gypsy Task Force–comprising the 1st Battalion of the 511th Parachute Infantry Regiment, G and I Companies of the regiment's 2nd Battalion, an artillery battery from the 457th Parachute Field Artillery Battalion, and a platoon of engineers and miscellaneous signal and medical detachments. Gypsy Task Force would be transported by 54 C-47s and 13 C-46s aircraft, as well as six Waco CG-4A Gliders which would land jeeps and supplies for the task force. On 21 June, a detachment of pathfinders from the division was flown in to secure Camalaniugan Airfield, and two days later the transport aircraft carrying the troops of Gypsy Task Force were escorted by fighters to the area. At 09:00 the pathfinder detachment set off colored smoke to mark the drop-zone, but fierce winds and uneven ground around the airfield proved hazardous to the parachutists, causing two deaths and seventy injuries during the drop. Despite these casualties the force was rapidly concentrated, and began its advance southwards. Japanese resistance was stiff, forcing the airborne troops to rely on flamethrowers to eliminate bunkers and fortifications along their route. After three days of fighting and having eliminated a significant portion of Shobu Group, the task force encountered the lead elements of the 37th Infantry Division. Although Shobu Group would continue its resistance until September, its encirclement marked the 11th Airborne Division's final combat operation of the war.

==== Division organization ====
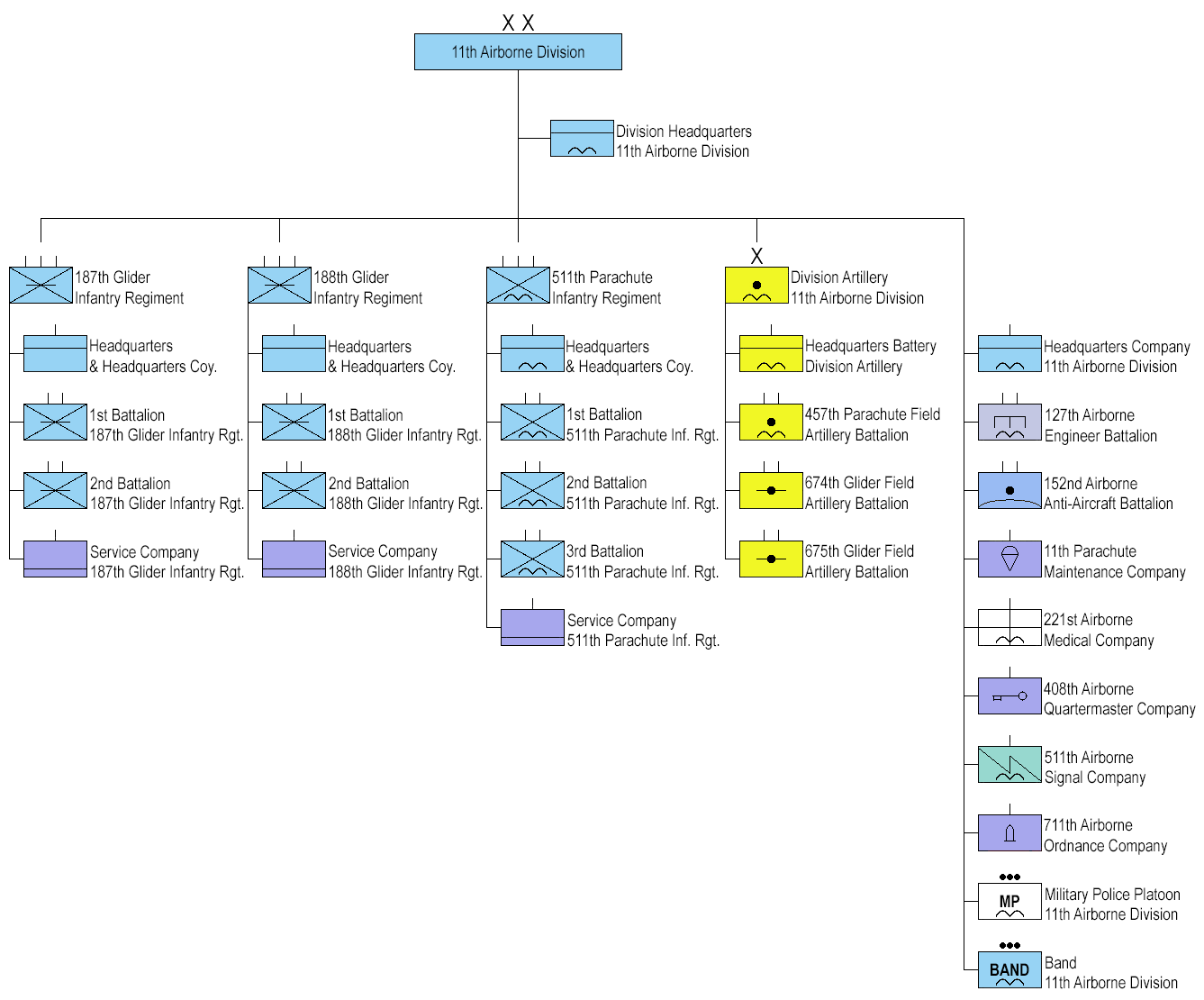
11th Airborne Division organization before 1 March 1945 (click to enlarge)

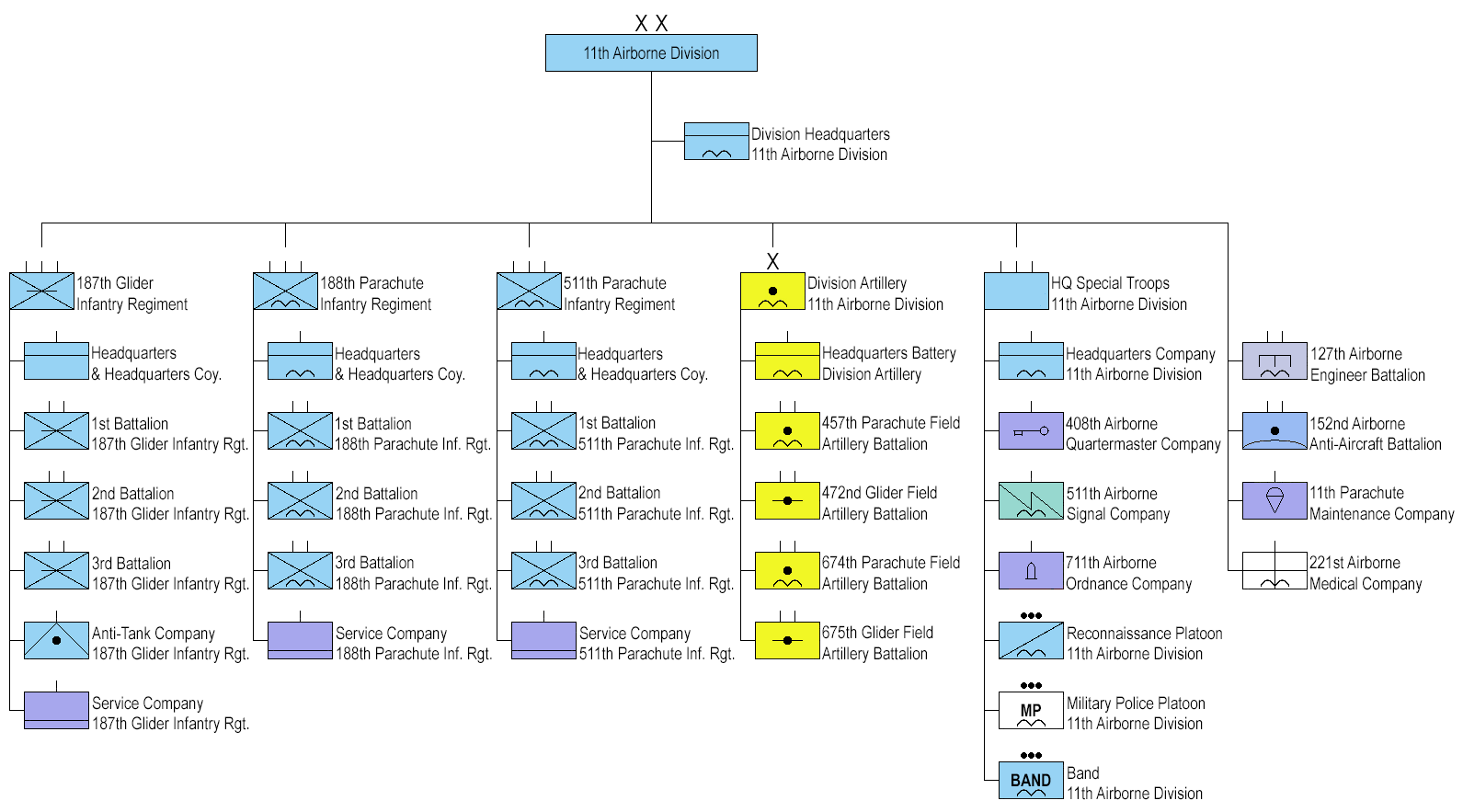
11th Airborne Division organization after 1 March 1945 (click to enlarge)

The 11th Airborne Division was composed of the following units:

- 11th Airborne Division
  - Division Headquarters
  - 187th Glider Infantry Regiment (187th GIR)
    - Headquarters and Headquarters Company
    - 2× glider infantry battalions (3× glider infantry battalions from 1 March 1945)
      - each battalion consists of: 1× Headquarters and Headquarters Company, 3× Rifle companies
    - Anti-Tank Company (assigned 1 March 1945)
    - Service Company
  - 188th Glider Infantry Regiment (188th GIR) (reorganized as 188th Parachute Infantry Regiment on 4 July 1945)
    - Headquarters and Headquarters Company
    - 2× glider infantry battalions (3× parachute infantry battalions from 4 July 1945)
      - each battalion consists of: 1× Headquarters and Headquarters Company, 3× Rifle companies
    - Service Company
  - 511th Parachute Infantry Regiment (511th PIR)
    - Headquarters and Headquarters Company
    - 3× parachute infantry battalions
      - each battalion consists of: 1× Headquarters and Headquarters Company, 3× Rifle companies
    - Service Company
  - 541st Parachute Infantry Regiment (541st PIR) (assigned July 1945, disbanded and its personnel transferred to 187th GIR, 188th PIR, 511th PIR)
    - same organization as 511th Parachute Infantry Regiment
  - 11th Airborne Division Artillery
    - Headquarters Battery
    - 457th Parachute Field Artillery Battalion
      - Headquarters and Headquarters and Service Battery
      - 3× Batteries (M1 75mm pack howitzers)
      - Anti-Aircraft and Anti-Tank Battery (M2 .50-caliber machine guns, M3 37mm Anti-Tank guns, and M1 Bazookas)
    - 472nd Glider Field Artillery Battalion (assigned 1 March 1945)
      - Headquarters and Headquarters and Service Battery
      - 2× Batteries (M1 75mm pack howitzers)
    - 674th Glider Field Artillery Battalion (converted to a Parachute Field Artillery Battalion in March 1945)
      - same organization as 472nd Glider Field Artillery Battalion
    - 675th Glider Field Artillery Battalion
      - same organization as 472nd Glider Field Artillery Battalion
  - Special Troops (Headquarters activated 1 March 45, until then the units below were directly under the Division Headquarters)
    - Headquarters Company, 11th Airborne Division
    - 408th Airborne Quartermaster Company
    - 511th Airborne Signal Company
    - 711th Airborne Ordnance Company
    - Reconnaissance Platoon (assigned 1 March 45)
    - Military Police Platoon
    - Band
  - 127th Airborne Engineer Battalion
    - Headquarters and Headquarters and Service Company
    - 2× Glider engineer companies
    - 1× Parachute engineer company
  - 152nd Airborne Anti-Aircraft Artillery Battalion
    - Headquarters and Headquarters Detachment
    - 3× Automatic weapon batteries (M3 37mm Anti-Tank guns and from June 1944 M1 57mm anti-tank guns)
    - 3× Machine gun batteries (M2 .50-caliber machine guns)
  - 11th Parachute Maintenance Company
  - 221st Airborne Medical Company

==== Casualties ====
- Total battle casualties: 2,431
- Killed in action: 494
- Died of wounds and injuries: 120
- Wounded in action: 1,926
- Missing in action: 11

==== Awards ====
During World War II the division and its members were awarded the following awards:

- Distinguished Unit Citations: 13
- Medal of Honor: 2
  - Private Elmer E. Fryar^{(KIA)}
  - Private First Class Manuel Pérez Jr.^{(KIA)}
- Distinguished Service Cross: 10 (Note: DSC recipients: Colonel Irvin R. Schimmelpfennig III (KIA), Major General Joseph M. Swing, Private First Class Joseph Siedenburg (KIA), 1st Lieutenant Henry G. Hynds, Major Charles P. Loeper (KIA), Colonel Robert H. Soule, Sergeant Pat Berardi/Bernardi (KIA), 2nd Lieutenant Mills T. Lowe, Sergeant Edward B. Reed and Tech Sergeant Robert C. Steele (KIA))
- Silver Star: 432
- Legion of Merit: 10
- Soldier's Medal: 56
- Bronze Star Medal: 1,515
- Air Medal: 41

=== Post-World War II ===
==== Occupation of Japan ====
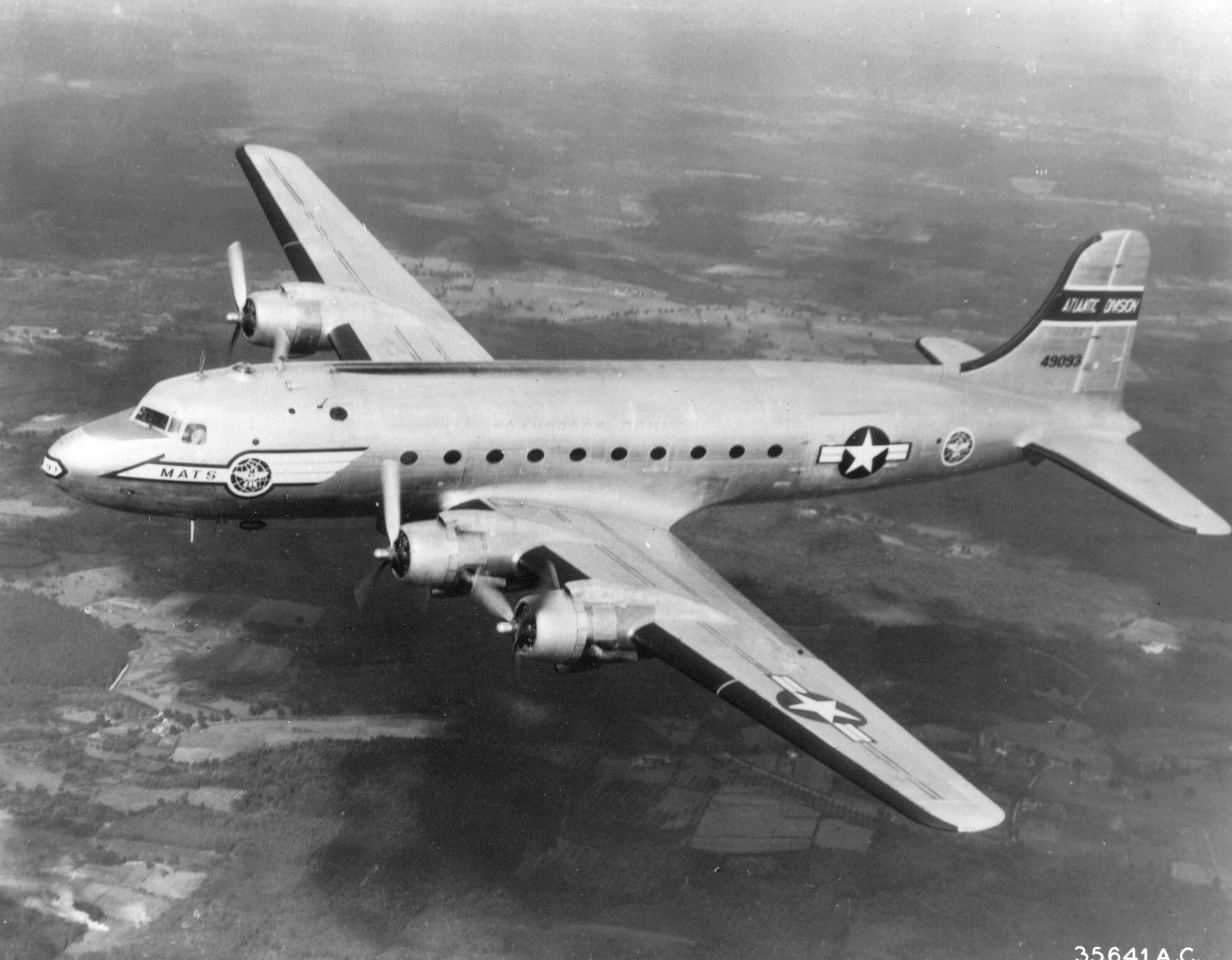
USAF C-54 Skymaster, of the type used to airlift the 11th Airborne Division into Japan

MacArthur made plans to use the 11th Airborne Division in the invasion of Japan; it was to remain as Sixth Army's operational reserve, to be committed if required. However, with the end of hostilities in the Pacific Theater due to the surrender of Japan, the division was instead selected by MacArthur to lead the American forces that would occupy Japan. The divisional staff received orders to this effect on 11 August 1945, and the division was transported to Okinawa on 12 August; an operation that involved 99 B-24 Liberator bombers, 350 C-46s and 150 C-47s to airlift 11,100 men, 120 vehicles and approximately 1.16 million pounds (530,000 kg) of equipment. The 11th Airborne remained on Okinawa for several weeks before, on 28 August, it was ordered to land at Atsugi Airfield outside of Yokohama, on the main Japanese home island of Honshū. Its instructions were to secure the surrounding area, evacuate all Japanese civilians and military personnel within a radius of three miles (4.8 km), and finally occupy Yokohama itself. A large number of C-54 Skymaster transport aircraft were made available, with the first—carrying Swing and his divisional staff—landing at Atsugi Airfield at 06:00 on 30 August. It took a week to fully assemble the division, and by 13 September it had been joined by the 27th Infantry Division, which was airlifted into Japan at the same time. The 11th Airborne Division was later moved from Yokohama to northern Japan, and established camps along the coast of Honshu and on the island of Hokkaido.

Occupation duties in Japan continued until May 1949, when the 11th Airborne was relieved and recalled to the United States. The division was transferred to Camp Campbell in Kentucky and remained a combat formation ready to deploy worldwide. During the early 1950s, the Angels conducted several large scale training operations in Alaska, such as Exercise Snowbird. Angels descended near Denali on the first day from C-119s over the arctic region. Inactivated at Camp Anza, California in December 1945, the 503rd PIR was reactivated and redesignated as the 503rd Airborne Infantry Regiment in February 1951 and assigned to the 11th Airborne Division at Fort Campbell, Kentucky, following the departure of the 187th Airborne Infantry Regiment to Korea as a separate airborne regimental combat team. In 1956 the 503rd went with the rest of the 11th Airborne Division to posts in southeastern Germany.

=== Korean War ===
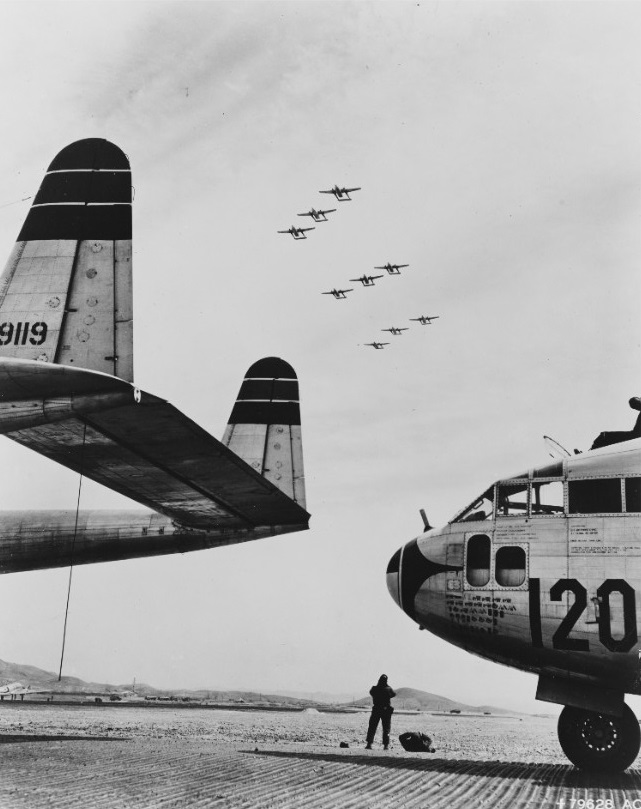
USAF C-119 transport aircraft headed for a drop zone northwest of Seoul with paratroopers of the 187th RCT, 23 March 1951

Training continued until the outbreak of the Korean War in 1950. For service in Korea, the 187th Glider Infantry Regiment—now renamed the 187th Airborne Infantry Regiment—and the 674th Airborne Field Artillery Battalion were detached from the division and re-formed as a separate Regimental Combat Team (RCT). Many personnel from the 511th Parachute Infantry Regiment were transferred to the 187th ARCT to bring it up to full strength for overseas deployment. The 187th made successful combat parachute assaults near the towns of Sukchon and Sunchon, north of the North Korean capital of Pyongyang, as part of the Battle of Yongju. The published purpose of that drop was to capture members of the North Korean Government fleeing Pyongyang and also to free American POWs being moved towards the Chinese border, however, neither objective was realized. The regiment later fought against North Korean and Chinese forces at Suan, Wonju, Kaesong, Munsan-ni, and Inje. During the winter of 1950, the 187th was caught up in the Chinese "Second Phase Offensive" and fought in the Battle of the Ch'ongch'on River. The 187th led the last parachute assault in Korea on 23 March 1951 as part of Operation Tomahawk and took part in the UN May–June 1951 counteroffensive. It redeployed to Japan on 26 June 1951 where it became a strategic reserve but returned to Korea on 24 May 1952 to assist in the suppression of the prisoner rebellion at the Geoje POW Camp, where prisoners had forcibly seized and held Brigadier General Francis Dodd, camp commandant, hostage for four days from 7 May 1952. After this, it once more returned to Japan on 18 October 1952 and made its final return to Korea on 22 June 1953. The unit returned to the United States in July 1955.

Four members of the 187th were awarded the Medal of Honor for their actions in the Korean War: Corporal Lester Hammond, Jr.^{(KIA)}, Corporal Rodolfo P. Hernandez^{(WIA)}, Corporal Joe R. Baldonado^{(KIA)} and Private First Class Richard G. Wilson^{(KIA)}.

=== Operation Gyroscope and First inactivation ===
The 11th Airborne Division was sent to Germany in early 1956 as part of Operation Gyroscope, to replace the 5th Infantry Division stationed in Augsburg and Munich. As the division was en route, the 187th RCT was relocated to Fort Campbell, taking over the camps that the 11th had recently vacated. In July that year the 187th, along with the 508th ARC, was transferred to the newly reactivated 101st Airborne Division.

As the American Army began to restructure its organization (known as the Pentomic Concept), the battalions of the 187th were reorganized as Airborne Battle Groups. In early 1957 the lineage of Company A, 187th AIR was redesignated as HHC, 1st Airborne Battle Group, 187th Infantry and administratively transferred (less personnel and equipment) to Augsburg to join its former parent formation, where it was formed from the existing personnel and equipment of the 11th Airborne Division. HHC, 2d Airborne Battle Group, 187th Infantry, formed from the lineage of Company B, 187th AIR remained with the 101st until 1964 while the 3d Battalion was inactivated. The 11th Division was itself inactivated in Augsburg on 1 July 1958, being reorganized and reflagged as the 24th Infantry Division. The 1st ABG, 187th Infantry and the 1st ABG, 503d Infantry, retained their Airborne designations and jump status within the 24th until both groups rotated back to the US for assignment to the 82d Airborne Division at Fort Bragg, NC.

=== 11th Air Assault Division (Test) ===
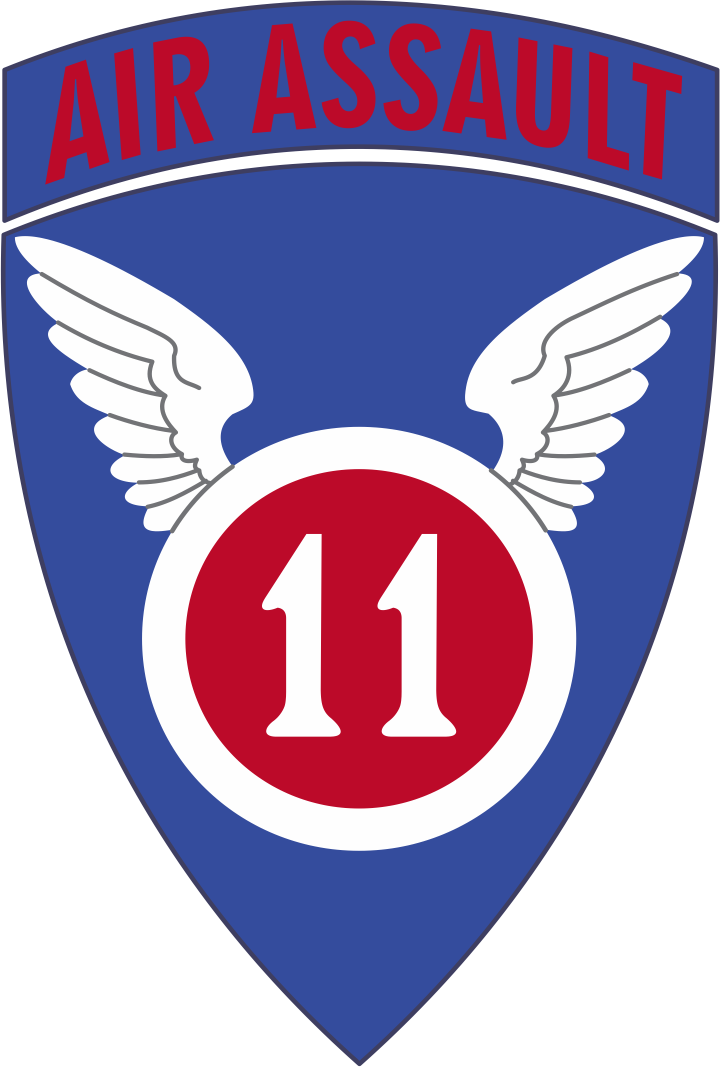
11th Air Assault Division (Test) SSI

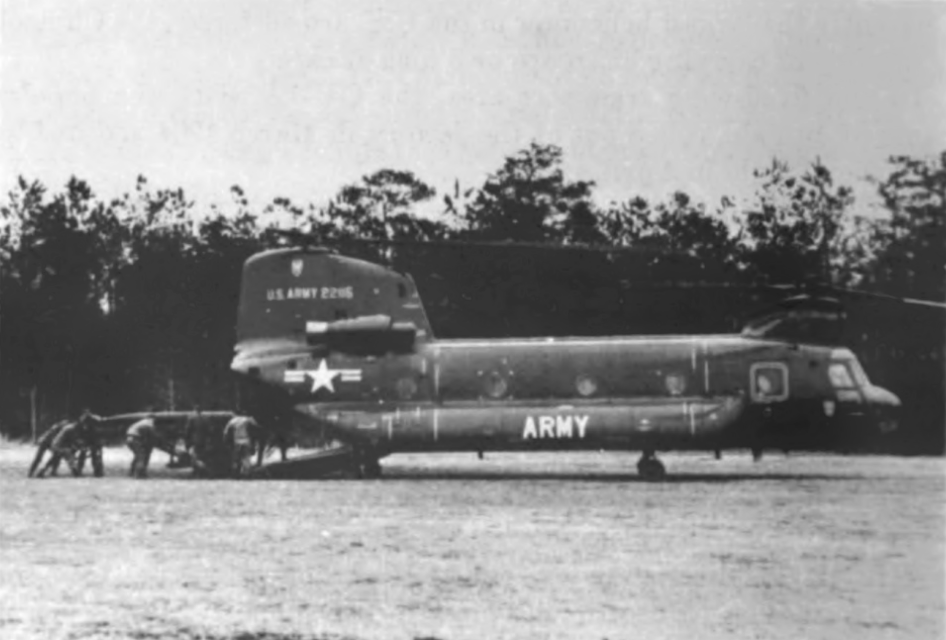
11th Air Assault Division (Test) soldiers load an MGR-3 Little John missile into a CH-47A Chinook for rapid delivery and emplacement exercise

In 1960, Lt. General Gordon B. Rogers chaired the Army Aircraft Requirements Review Board. It recommended selection of the UH-1 Huey and CH-47 Chinook helicopters as primary airlift capability for the U.S. Army. The board also recommended that an operational use study be considered and mentioned the possibility of creating a unit to test operational concepts. Defense Secretary Robert S. McNamara selected Lt. Gen. Hamilton H. Howze, the Army's first director of aviation, to implement the study. McNamara handpicked the board members and, in what many considered a slap in the face, prevented Secretary of the Army Elvis Jacob Stahr Jr., from nominating anyone.

The Howze Board released its findings on August 20, 1962. It proposed huge changes in Army doctrine:

Adoption of the Army of the airmobile concept—however imperfectly it may be described and justified in this report—is necessary and desirable. In some respects the transition is inevitable, just as was that from animal mobility to motor.

To test the concept of helicopter assault, the 11th Airborne Division was reactivated at Fort Benning on 1 February 1963 and redesignated as the 11th Air Assault Division (Test) as a unit of the Regular Army. The 10th Air Transport Brigade was formed around an existing aviation battalion at Fort Benning to manage and fly the helicopters assigned to the division. The 11th Aviation Group was created, consisting of the 227th, 228th, and 229th Aviation Battalions. Elements of its original combat units, the 187th Infantry, the 188th Infantry and the 511th Infantry, were reformed under the new division. The group also included the 11th Aviation Company (General Support), 17th Aviation Company (Airmobile Light), and 478th Aviation Company (Heavy Helicopter).

Under the leadership of Major General Charles W. G. Rich, the Test Director, and Brigadier General Harry W. O. Kinnard, the Division Commander, the group developed an organizational structure and plans for a unit that could move one-third of the division's infantry battalions and supporting units in one single helicopter lift.

The 11th Air Assault Division developed and refined air assault tactics and the equipment required to operate effectively in the role. The 187th and 188th tested helicopters during various exercises, ranging from command and control maneuvers to scouting, screening and aerial resupply, to assess their ability to perform as combat aircraft. In September 1963, Air Assault I exercises tested the Airmobility concept at the battalion level at Fort Stewart in Georgia. Air Assault II, a much larger exercise, was conducted across two states in October 1964. The 11th Air Assault Division operated against the 82nd Airborne Division and the 11th thoroughly dominated the exercise. The 11th was not constituted as a full division during the test period. Although the intent was to create three air assault brigades, the test division included an air assault brigade (which was also parachute-qualified), an airmobile brigade, and both ground and a new air artillery element provided by helicopters known as aerial rocket artillery (ARA).

When the test was concluded, the assets of the 11th Air Assault Division (Test), the 10th Air Transport Brigade, and the 2nd Infantry Division were merged into a single unit. On 29 June 1965, the colors and subordinate unit designations of the 1st Cavalry Division were transferred from its post in Korea to Fort Benning. On 3 July 1965, the 11th Air Assault Division (Test) was inactivated and its colors cased. The 1st Cavalry Division (Airmobile) colors were moved onto the field at Doughboy Stadium and passed to the commander of the former 11th Air Assault Division, Major General Kinnard. At the same time the personnel and units of the 1st Cavalry Division that remained in Korea were reflagged as a new 2nd Infantry Division. On 29 July 1965, President Lyndon B. Johnson ordered the 1st Cavalry Division (Airmobile) to Vietnam.

| 11th Air Assault Division units (original designations) | 1st Cavalry Division units (re-designations) |
| HHC, 11th Air Assault Division (Test) | HHC, 1st Cavalry Division |
| 3rd Squadron, 17th Cavalry | 1st Squadron, 9th Cavalry |
| HHC, 1st Brigade (Airborne), 11th Air Assault Division | HHC, 1st Brigade (Airborne), 1st Cavalry Division |
| 1st Battalion (Airborne), 188th Infantry | 1st Battalion (Airborne), 8th Cavalry |
| 1st Battalion (Airborne), 511th Infantry | 2nd Battalion (Airborne), 8th Cavalry |
| 1st Battalion (Airborne), 187th Airborne | 1st Battalion (Airborne), 12th Cavalry |
| HHB, 11th Air Assault Division Artillery | HHB, 1st Cavalry Division Artillery |
| 6th Battalion, 81st Artillery (105 mm) | 2nd Battalion (Airborne), 19th Artillery (105 mm) |
| 3nd Battalion, 377th Artillery (aerial rocket) | 2nd Battalion, 20th Artillery (aerial rocket) |
| HHC and Band Support Command, 11th Air Assault Division | HHC and Band Support Command, 1st Cavalry Division |
| 11th Medical Battalion | 15th Medical Battalion |
| 408th Supply and Services Battalion | 15th Supply and Services Battalion |
| 165th Aerial Equipment Supply Detachment | – Support Company, Aerial Equipment Supply Detachment (Airborne) |
| 11th Administrative Company | 15th Administrative Company |
| 711th Maintenance Battalion | 27th Maintenance Battalion |
| 127th Engineer Battalion | 8th Engineer Battalion |
| 511th Signal Battalion | 13th Signal Battalion |
| 611th Aircraft Maintenance and Supply Battalion | 15th Transportation Battalion |
| 11th Military Police Company | 545th Military Police Company |
| 11th Military Intelligence Detachment | 191st Military Intelligence Detachment |
| Company C, 313th Army Security Agency Battalion | 371st Army Security Agency Company |

== Air Assault Badge ==
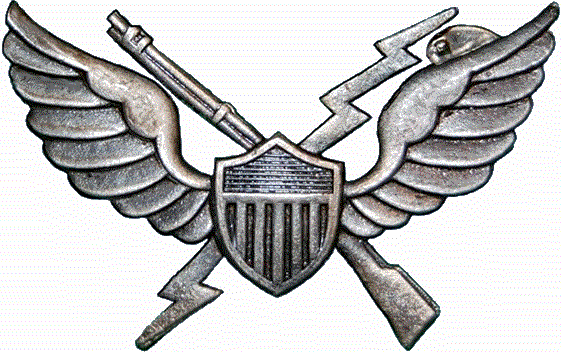
Air Assault Badge (obsolete)

An unauthorized predecessor to the current Air Assault Badge, the original Air Assault Badge was worn by troops assigned to the 11th who qualified by making three helicopter rappels from 60 feet (18 m) and three from 120 feet (37 m). Soldiers were also required to be knowledgeable of aircraft safety procedures; familiar with aircraft orientation; proficient in hand and arm signals and combat assault operations; able to prepare, inspect and rig equipment for external sling loads; and able to lash down equipment inside helicopters. The badge was first awarded in early 1964 and was authorized for wear by soldiers within the 11th Air Assault Division (Test). When the 11th was inactivated, the badge was no longer awarded.

== Twenty-first century ==
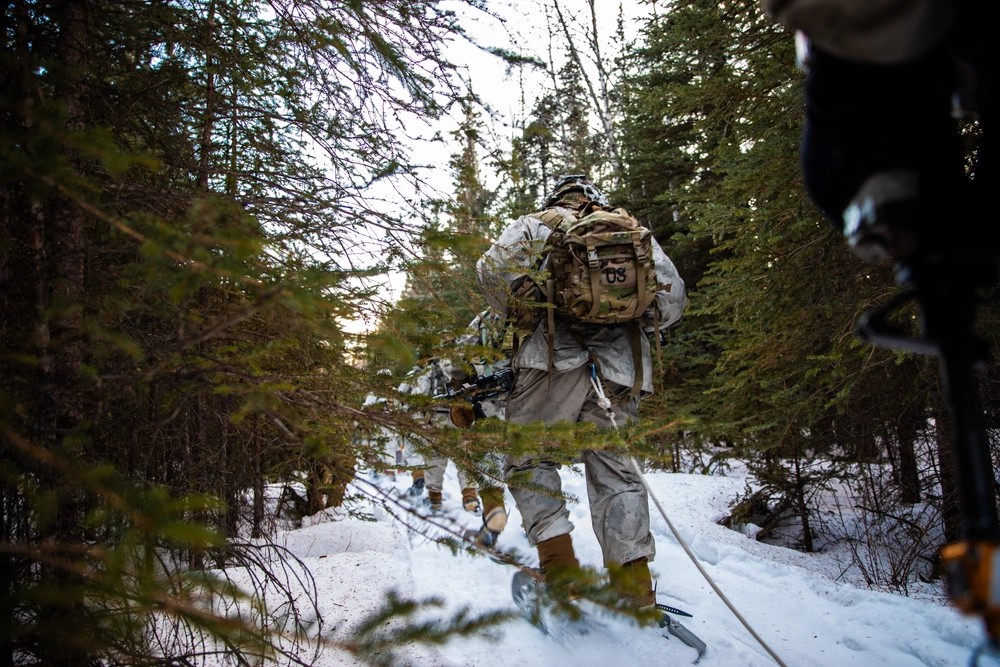
11th Airborne Division soldiers carry equipment through a forest at Delta Junction, Alaska, February 2024.

Spartan paratroopers conduct arctic airborne insertion training in Alaska (4:51)

In May 2022, during a hearing of the Senate Armed Services Committee, Army Secretary Christine Wormuth and Army Chief of Staff General James McConville announced that U.S. Army Alaska would be reflagged as the 11th Airborne Division. According to Wormuth and McConville, the goals of the redesignation are to give the Alaska-based forces a better sense of purpose and identity during a time of a spike in suicides. The redesignation is also meant to give a focus to the Army's Arctic strategy. U.S. Senator Dan Sullivan of Alaska said "..redesignating U.S. Army Alaska under the 11th Airborne Division banner presents a dual opportunity for our country—renewing the spirit and purpose of our Alaska-based soldiers by connecting them with this division's proud and storied history, and better fulfilling America's role as an Arctic nation." Major General Brian S. Eifler, the first 11th Airborne Division commanding general since reactivation, shared with the press the basic outline of the division stating, "There's no other formation that's going to look like it, nor have the same mission."

Along with the reactivation of the 11th Airborne Division, on 25 April 2022 the G-1 of the U.S. Army authorized the wear of the Arctic Tab by soldiers assigned to organizations in Alaska as a temporary wear tab with specific SSIs. This means 11th Airborne Division soldiers will be the first U.S. Army unit to be authorized two tabs with their SSI, the Airborne Tab and Arctic Tab.

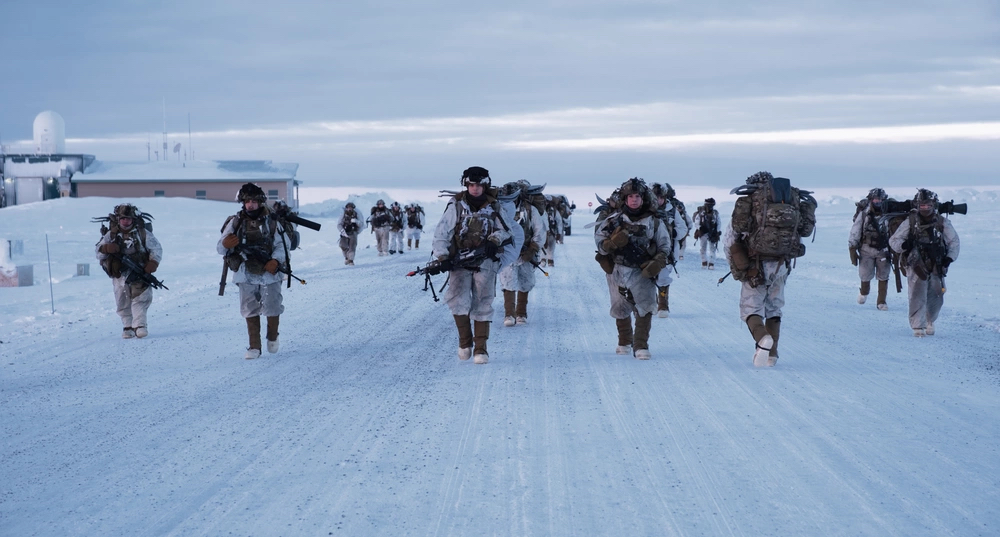
11th Airborne soldiers training near Utqiagvik, Alaska, February 2024.

On June 6, 2022, during separate ceremonies, the 1st and 4th Brigade Combat Teams of the 25th Infantry Division were reflagged to the 1st Infantry Brigade Combat Team and 2nd Infantry Brigade Combat Team (Airborne), 11th Airborne Division respectively. All units from the former U.S. Army Alaska were absorbed under the new division. It was also announced that the 1st Brigade would remove its Strykers from service. Following these changes, the brigade would test several new vehicles including the Cold-Weather All-Terrain Vehicle (CATV) to replace the former Strykers. The division's 2nd Brigade would remain largely unchanged.

== Division organization ==
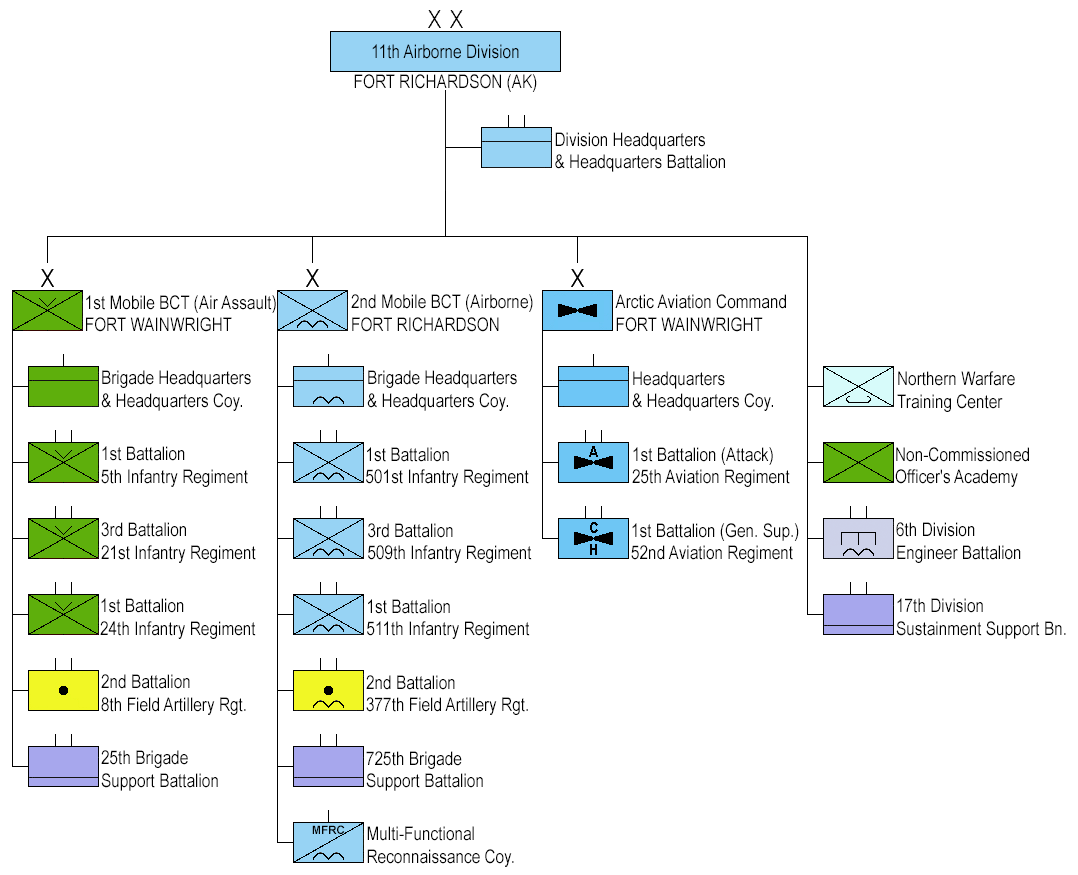
11th Airborne Division organization as of November 2026

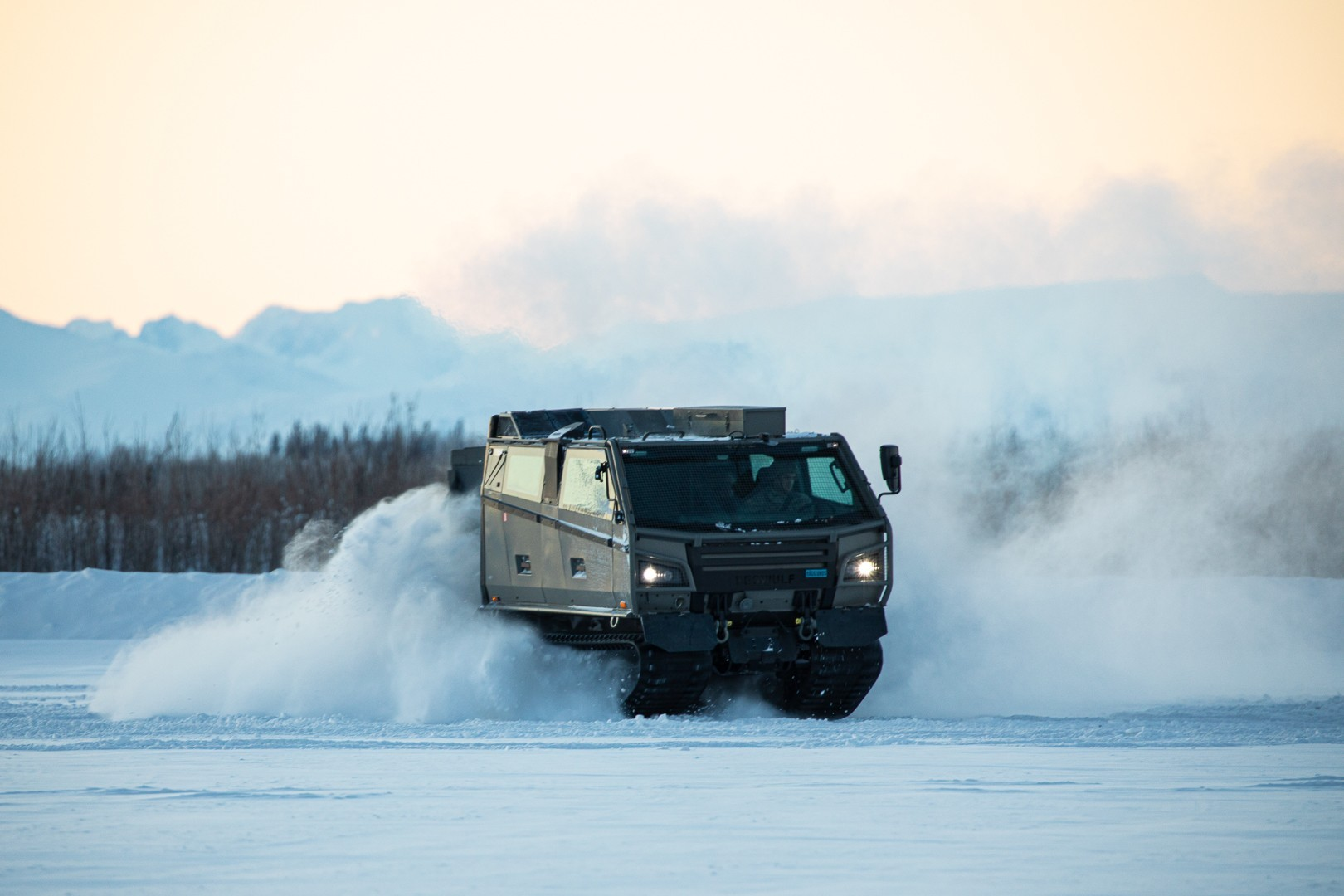
Cold Weather All-Terrain Vehicle

According to sources from May to September 2022, the division consisted of the following units at that time:

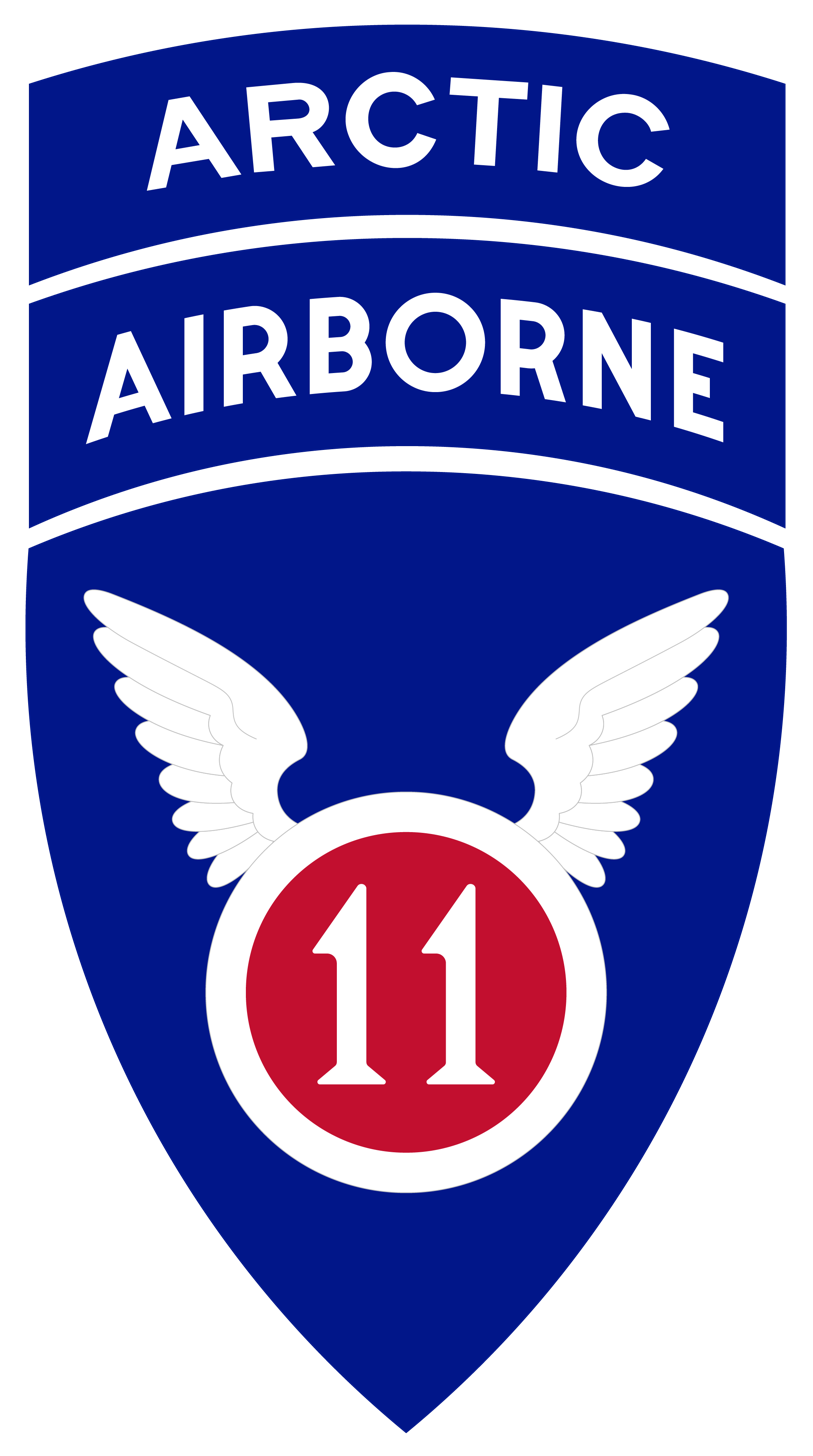
- 11th Airborne Division "Arctic Angels"
  - Division Headquarters and Headquarters Battalion
    - Headquarters and Support Company (Division)
    - Signal Intelligence and Sustainment Company (Division)
  - Northern Warfare Training Center
  - Non-Commissioned Officer's Academy
  - 6th Division Engineer Battalion "Arctic Sappers"
  - Arctic Warrior Band, formally known as The 9th Army Band, at Joint Base Elmendorf-Richardson
  - 1st Mobile Brigade Combat Team (Air Assault) "Arctic Wolves", at Fort Wainwright
    - Headquarters and Headquarters Company "Dire Wolves"
    - 1st Battalion, 5th Infantry Regiment "Bobcat"
    - 3rd Battalion, 21st Infantry Regiment
    - 1st Battalion, 24th Infantry Regiment "Blockhouse"
    - 2nd Battalion, 8th Field Artillery Regiment "Automatic"
    - 25th Light Support Battalion "Opahey"
  - 2nd Mobile Brigade Combat Team (Airborne) "Spartans", at Joint Base Elmendorf-Richardson
    - Headquarters and Headquarters Company
    - Multi-Functional Reconnaissance Company
    - 1st Battalion, 501st Infantry Regiment "Geronimo"
    - 3rd Battalion, 509th Infantry Regiment "Stand in the Door"
    - 1st Battalion, 511th Infantry Regiment "Strength From Above"
    - 2nd Battalion, 377th Field Artillery Regiment "Spartan Steel"
    - 725th Light Support Battalion (Airborne) "Centurion"
  - Arctic Aviation Command, at Fort Wainwright (activated 8 August 2024)
    - Headquarters and Headquarters Company, Arctic Aviation Command
    - 1st Battalion (Attack Reconnaissance), 25th Aviation Regiment
    - 1st Battalion (General Support Aviation), 52nd Aviation Regiment
    - 343rd Aviation Support Detachment (Maintenance)
  - 11th Airborne Division Sustainment Brigade (Arctic), at Joint Base Elmendorf-Richardson
    - 11th Airborne Division Sustainment Troops Battalion
    - 17th Division Sustainment Support Battalion "Always Ready", at Fort Wainwright and Joint Base Elmendorf-Richardson
    - 106th Intelligence and Electronic Warfare Battalion

== Previous commanders ==
Division Activated - February 1943

- Joseph M. Swing February 1943 – January 1948
- William Miley January 1948 – January 1950
- Lyman L. Lemnitzer January 1950 – November 1951
- Wayne C. Smith November 1951 – January 1952
- Ridgely Gaither January 1952 – April 1953
- Wayne C. Smith April 1953 – May 1955
- Derrill M. Daniel May 1955 – September 1956
- Hugh P. Harris October 1956 – April 1958
- Ralph C. Cooper May 1958 – June 1958

Division Inactivated – June 1958

Division Reactivated as Air Assault Testing Division

- Harry W.O. Kinnard 1963 – 1965

U.S. Army Alaska redesignated as 11th Airborne Division - June 2022

- Brian S. Eifler June 2022 – June 2024
- Joseph Hilbert June 2024 - August 2025
- John Cogbill August 2025 – present

== Honors ==
=== Lineage and honors ===
- Constituted 12 November 1942 in Army of the United States as Headquarters, 11th Airborne Division
- Activated 25 February 1943 at Camp Mackall, North Carolina
- Allotted 1 5 November 1948 to the Regular Army
- Inactivated 1 July 1958 in Germany
- Redesignated 1 February 1963 as Headquarters and Headquarters Company, 11th Air Assault Division
- Activated 7 February 1963 at Fort Benning, Georgia
- Inactivated 1 July 1965 at Fort Benning, Georgia
- Redesignated 24 January 1972 as Headquarters and Headquarters Company, 11th Airborne Division
- Activated 16 October 2023 at Joint Base Elmendorf-Richardson, Alaska, as Headquarters and Headquarters Battalion, 11th Airborne Division

==== Campaign participation credit ====
World War II

- New Guinea
- Leyte
- Luzon (with arrowhead)

Decorations

| Ribbon | Award | Year | Notes |
|---|---|---|---|
| Dark blue ribbon with a gold border | Presidential Unit Citation (Army) | 1945 | Streamer embroidered MANILA |
| Red ribbon | Philippine Republic Presidential Unit Citation | 1944–1945 | Streamer embroidered 17 OCTOBER 1944 TO 4 JULY 1945 |

== Notable members ==
- Rod Serling, former 11th Airborne Division paratrooper and creator of The Twilight Zone TV series.
- Lauri Törni, aka Major Larry Thorne, a former 11th Airborne Division soldier who was killed on a 1965 covert MACV-SOG mission in Vietnam.
- Darwin Gross, (1928–2008) former 11th Airborne Division soldier who was a former leader of Eckankar
- Vernon Baker, former 11th Airborne Division soldier who fought in WW2 with the 92nd Infantry Division and was recipient of the Medal of Honor
- Charles Napier, served with the 511th Infantry Regiment, 11th Airborne Division, rising to the rank of sergeant.
- Charles L. Kelly served as a Medical Service Corps officer in the 188th Airborne Infantry Regiment and the 710th Tank Battalion from 1952-1954, killed in action on 1 July 1964 in Vietnam as a medical evacuation pilot; "The Father of Dustoff."
