= 11th Airborne Division Artillery =

- Active: 1943–58, 1963–65
- Country: United States of America
- Branch: United States Army
- Type: Field artillery
- Role: Division artillery
- Size: Brigade
- Equipment: M1 75mm pack howitzer; M3 105mm howitzer
- Engagements: World War II

The 11th Airborne Division Artillery is an inactive field artillery unit of the United States Army. The unit served with the 11th Airborne Division in the Pacific Theater during World War II, in Germany and the United States during the early Cold War before inactivating in 1958. Reactivated from 1963 to 1965, the unit tested the air mobility concepts at Fort Benning, Georgia, before inactivating again.

== Lineage and honors ==
=== Lineage ===
- Constituted 27 November 1942 in the Army of the United States as Headquarters and Headquarters Battery, 11th Airborne Division Artillery
- Activated 25 February 1943 at Camp Mackall, North Carolina
- Allotted 15 November 1948 to the Regular Army
- Inactivated 1 July 1958 in Germany
- Redesignated 17 July 1963 as Headquarters and Headquarters Battery, 11th Air Assault Division Artillery.
- Activated 18 July 1963 at Fort Benning, Georgia
- Inactivated 1 July 1965 at Fort Benning, Georgia
- Redesignated 24 January 1972 as Headquarters and Headquarters Battery, 11th Airborne Division Artillery

=== Campaign participation credit ===
- World War II: New Guinea; Leyte; Luzon (with arrowhead)

=== Decorations ===
- Philippine Presidential Unit Citation, Stream embroidered 17 OCTOBER 1944 TO 4 JULY 1945 (11th Airborne Division cited; DA GO 47, 1950)
