= 1st Mobile Brigade Combat Team (Air Assault), 11th Airborne Division =

Active US Army formation

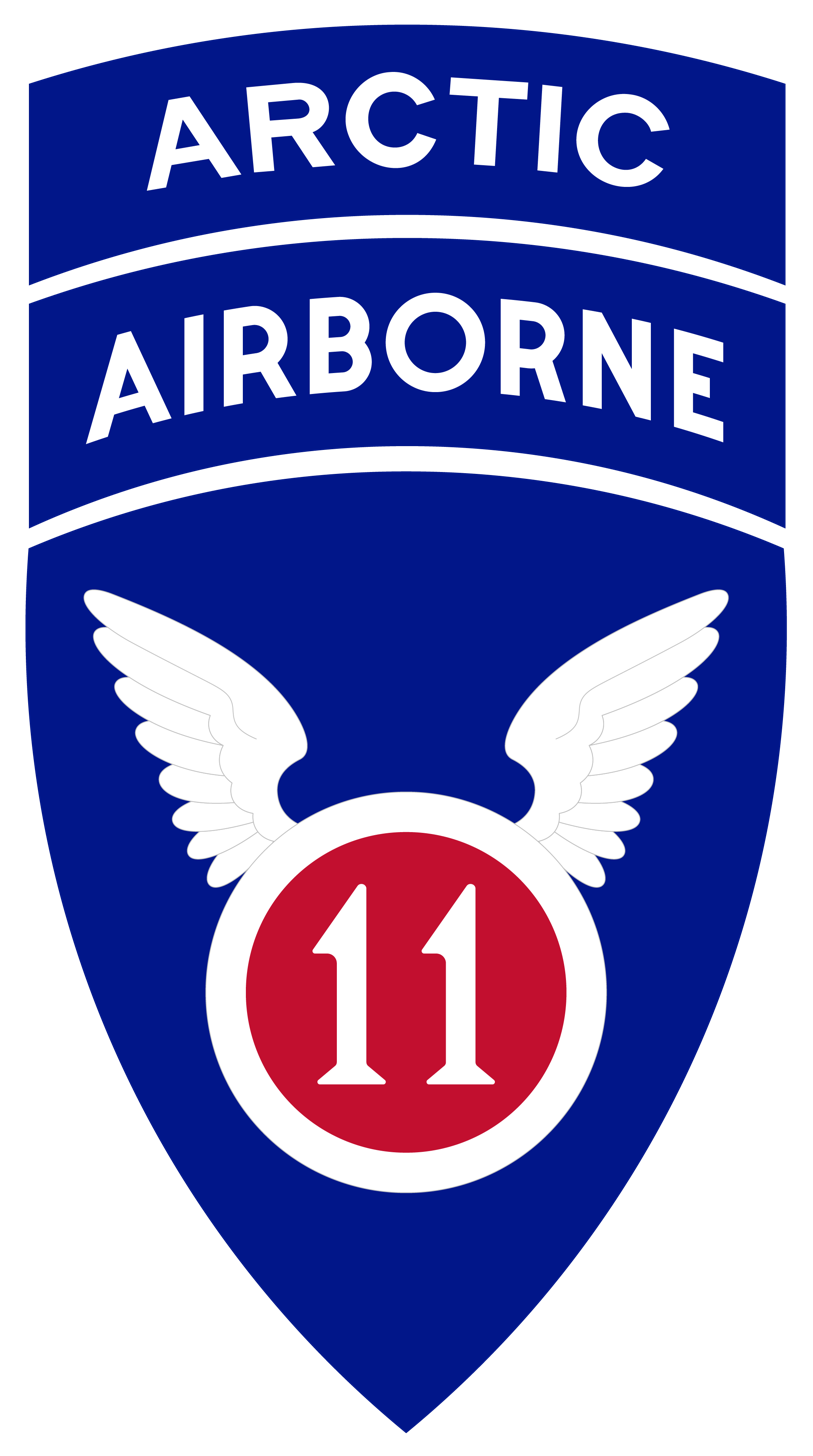
- 11th Airborne Division Shoulder Sleeve Insignia
- Active: 1917 – present
- Country: United States of America
- Branch: United States Army
- Type: Motorized infantry
- Part of: 11th Airborne Division
- Garrison/HQ: Fort Wainwright, Alaska
- Nickname: Arctic Wolves
- Engagements: World War I World War II; Vietnam War; Operation Iraqi Freedom; Operation Enduring Freedom

Insignia
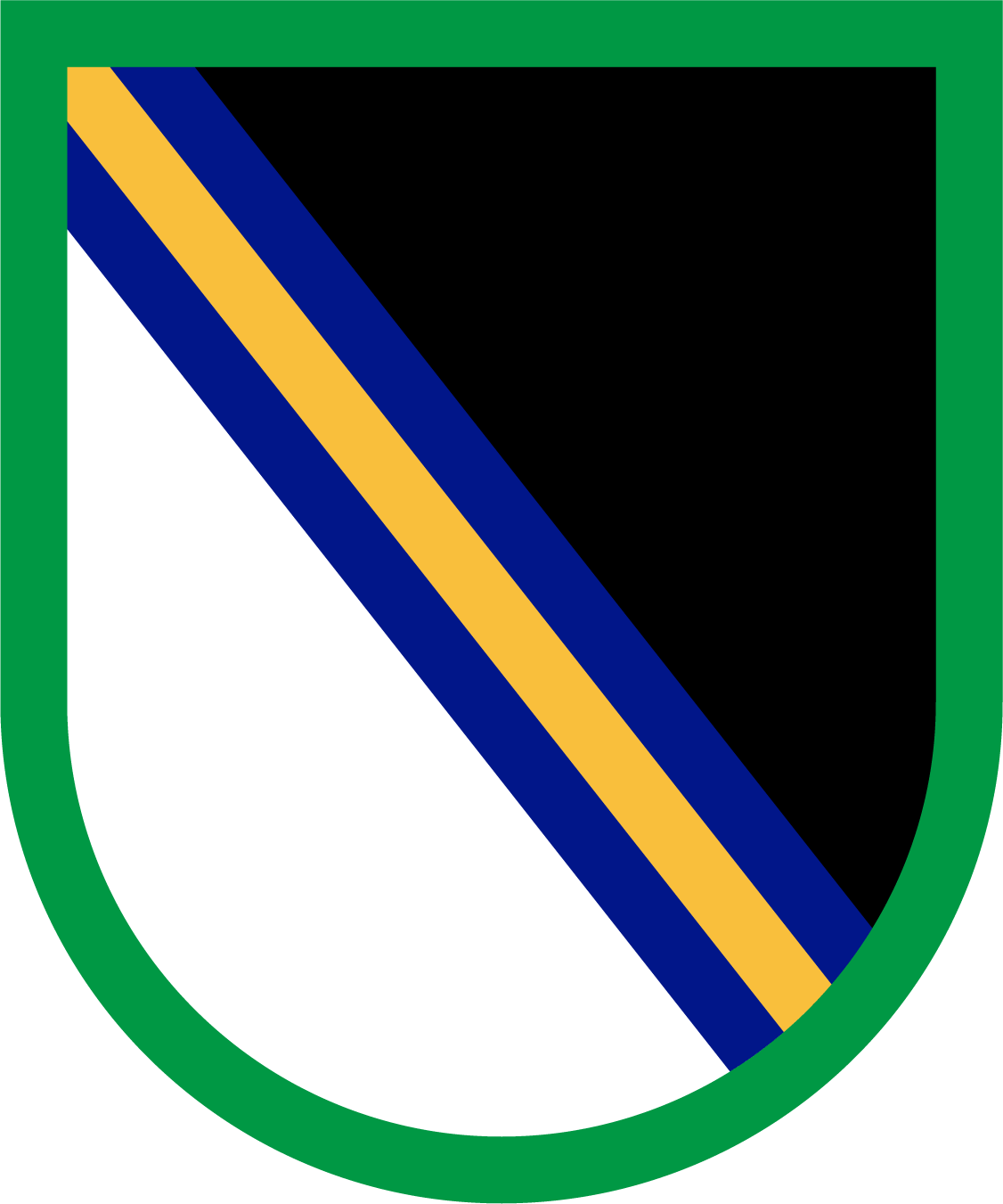
- 1st battalion's beret flash

The 1st Mobile Brigade Combat Team (Air Assault), 11th Airborne Division is an infantry brigade combat team (BCT) of the United States Army, part of the 11th Airborne Division. Until 2022, the brigade was formally assigned to the 25th Infantry Division.

The unit is stationed at Fort Wainwright, Alaska.

== Organization ==
- 1st Mobile Brigade Combat Team (Air Assault) "Arctic Wolves"
  - Headquarters and Headquarters Company "Dire Wolves"
  - 1st Battalion, 5th Infantry Regiment "Bobcat"
  - 3rd Battalion, 21st Infantry Regiment
  - 1st Battalion, 24th Infantry Regiment "Legion"
  - 2nd Battalion, 8th Field Artillery Regiment "Automatic"
  - 25th Brigade Support Battalion "Opahey"

== History ==
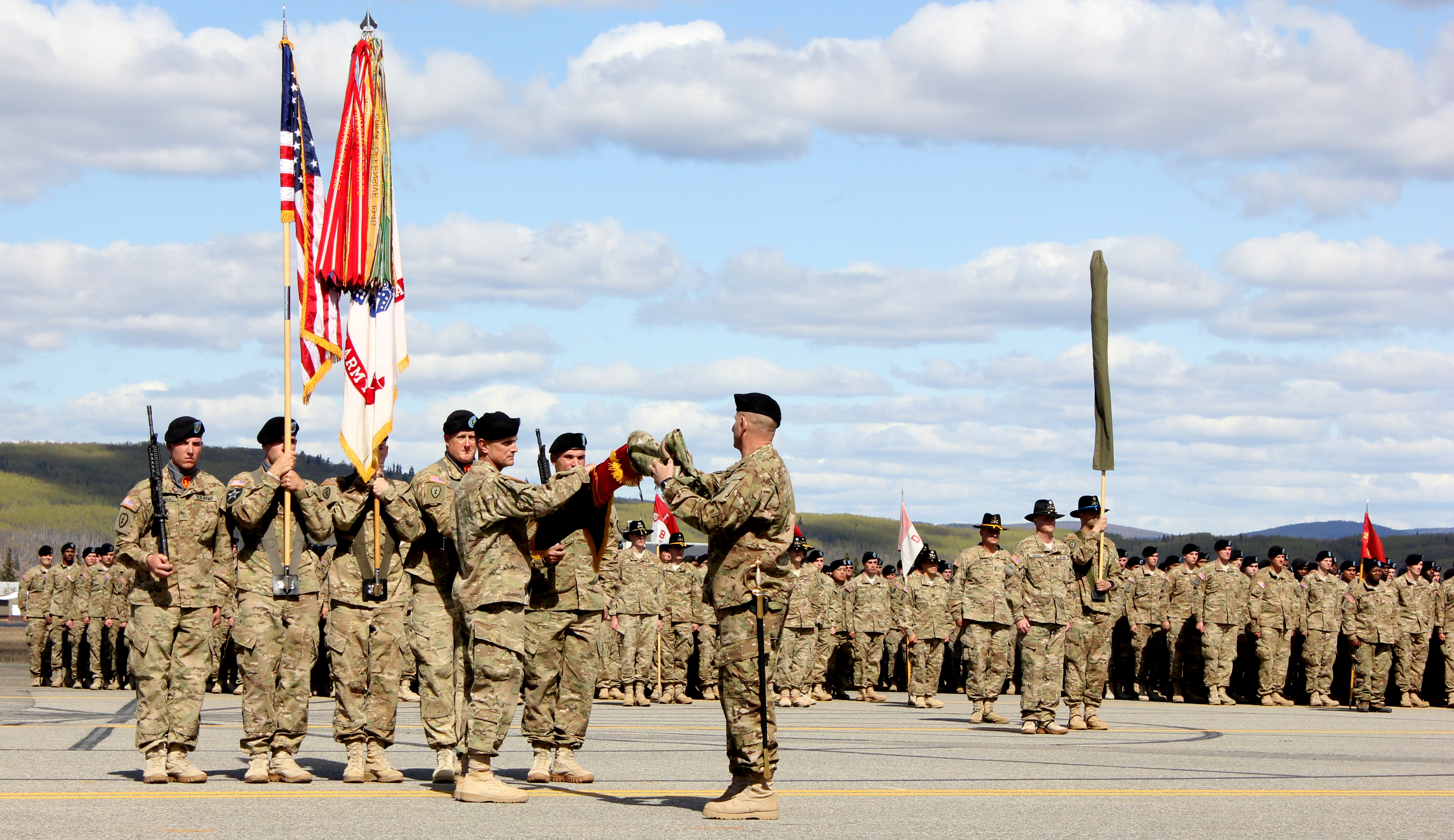
Colonel Todd R. Wood, former commander of the 1/25th Infantry Brigade, and Sergeant Major Bernie Knight unfurl the brigade's flag during the redeployment ceremony at the Army airfield Fort Wainwright.

The brigade traces its history to the headquarters of the 167th Infantry Brigade of the 84th Division, created in 1917. It was reorganized and renamed in 1942 as the 84th Reconnaissance Troop (excluding the 3rd Platoon) of the 84th Division. The 84th Infantry Division entered combat in Holland in November 1944. In response to the German counterattack in the Ardennes, the 84th Regiment was transferred to Belgium to help stop the German advance. After invading Germany and facing strong German resistance, the 84th Division crossed the Ruhr and Rhine rivers, reaching the Elbe River, and on 2 May 1945, joined forces with the Soviet Red Army. The 84th Reconnaissance Troop was disbanded in 1946 and reformed in 1947 as the 84th Reconnaissance Platoon (later Company). The 84th Reconnaissance Company was disbanded in 1959 and reorganized (excluding the 3rd Platoon) into the headquarters and headquarters company of the 167th Infantry Brigade. It was renamed the headquarters and headquarters company of the 1st Brigade of the 25th Infantry Division and began operating on 26 August 1963, at Schofield Barracks.

Arriving in Vietnam on 29 April 1966, the 1/25th Brigade was initially based in Cu Chi and participated in all twelve campaigns of the 25th Division, receiving a citation for courage in the Tay Ninh province. The battalions serving in the 1st Brigade were the 4/9th Infantry, 2/14th Infantry (until February 1970), 3/22nd Infantry (from February 1970), and 4/23rd Infantry (mechanized). The 1st Brigade left Vietnam on 8 December 1970, and was stationed at Schofield Barracks from 1971 until its relocation to Fort Lewis, Washington, in 1995.

In early 2002, the 1/25th Brigade began its transformation from a light infantry brigade to a "Stryker" brigade. It achieved combat readiness in mid-2004 and began a year-long deployment in Iraq in September 2004. The 1/25th Brigade distinguished itself in conducting large-scale counterinsurgency operations as well as stability initiatives in and around Mosul. For its combat operations in Iraq, the 1st Brigade and its subordinate units received a Valorous Unit Award and credit for participation in the Iraq management campaign. The brigade returned to Fort Lewis in September 2005. On 1 June 2006, the 1/25th Brigade and its subordinate units were deactivated, and its personnel and equipment were transferred to the 2nd Cavalry Regiment.

On 16 December 2006, the 1st Stryker Brigade of the 25th Infantry Division was reactivated at Fort Wainwright (Alaska). The 172nd Infantry Brigade, which had returned from 16 months of combat duty in Iraq, was officially redesignated as the 1st Stryker Brigade of the 25th Infantry Division, transferring the personnel and equipment of the disbanded 172nd Mechanized Brigade. In September 2008, the 1/25th Stryker Brigade began a 12-month deployment to Iraq. The 1/25th Stryker Brigade, stationed in Diyala Governorate northeast of Baghdad, served with the Multi-National Division – Baghdad as part of Task Force Northern Lightning. The brigade successfully conducted combat operations in partnership with Iraqi Security Forces against insurgent elements, as well as numerous civic action projects aimed at improving the quality of life in the province. The 1/25th Stryker Brigade received recognition for its participation in the Iraq Surge and Iraqi Sovereignty campaigns and returned to Fort Wainwright in September 2009.

From May 2011 to May 2012, the 1/25th Stryker Brigade was deployed to southern Afghanistan for the first time. During its 12-month deployment, it was based in Kandahar Province. Partnering with the Afghan 1st Brigade, 205th Corps, and Afghan police units, the 1/25th Stryker Brigade's capabilities significantly enabled Afghan and International Security Assistance Force forces to conduct offensive operations that resulted in a significant reduction in insurgent attacks in the province. For its service in Afghanistan, the 1/25th Stryker Brigade was credited for participating in the Consolidation III and Transition I military campaigns.

On 6 June 2022, the brigade was redesignated as the 1st Infantry Brigade of the 11th Airborne Division. Prior to 6 June 2022, the brigade was under the command of the U.S. Army Alaska Command, formally part of the 25th Infantry Division, which is headquartered in Hawaii. It was announced that the 1/11th Infantry Brigade would dismantle its Strykers for spare parts in the summer of 2022 and transfer operational vehicles to other Army mechanized units. Following these changes, the brigade would test several new vehicles, including the dual-tracked all-terrain vehicle CATV, which would replace the former Stryker. On 22 August, the dual-tracked all-terrain vehicle BvS10 Beowulf was selected to replace the Stryker.

== Lineage and honors ==
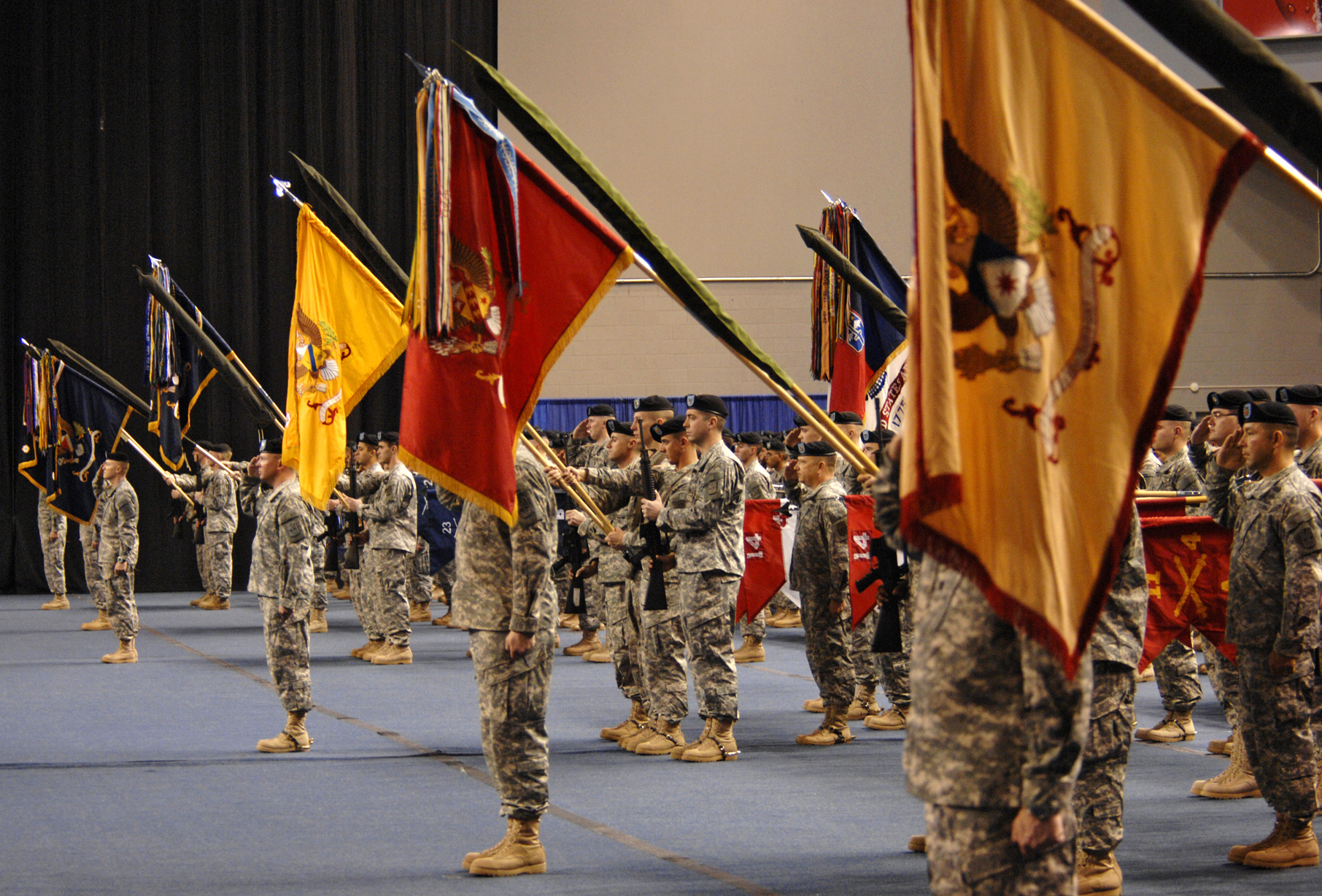
Soldiers stand in formation during the reflagging ceremony of the 172nd Stryker Brigade to the 1st/25th Stryker Brigade at Fairbanks, Alaska, on December 14, 2006.

- Formed on 5 August 1917, in the National Army as the Headquarters of the 167th Infantry Brigade, assigned to the 84th Division
- Organized on 25 August 1917, at Camp Zachary Taylor, Kentucky
- Demobilized in February 1919 at Camp Zachary Taylor, Kentucky
- Reconstituted on 24 June 1921, as Headquarters and Headquarters Company of the 167th Infantry Brigade in the Organized Reserves, assigned to the 84th Division
- Organized in November 1921 in Southern Indiana
- Renamed on 23 March 1925, to Headquarters and Headquarters Company, 167th Brigade
- Renamed on 24 August 1936, to Headquarters and Headquarters Company, 167th Infantry Brigade
- Reorganized and renamed on 23 February 1942, to the 84th Reconnaissance Troop (excluding the 3rd Platoon) of the 84th Division (simultaneously, Headquarters and Headquarters Company of the 168th Infantry Brigade was reorganized and renamed as the 3rd Platoon of the 84th Reconnaissance Troop)
- Activated on 15 October 1942, and reorganized at Camp Howze, Texas, into the 84th Cavalry Reconnaissance Troop, part of the 84th Infantry Division
- Reorganized and renamed on 12 August 1943, to the 84th Reconnaissance Mechanized Company
- Inactivated on 24 January 1946, at Camp Kilmer, New Jersey
- Renamed on 19 December 1946, to the 84th Mechanized Cavalry Reconnaissance Platoon, assigned to the 84th Airborne Division
- Activated on 11 June 1947, in Madison, Wisconsin (Organized Reserves were renamed on 25 March 1948, to the Organized Reserve Corps; renamed on 9 July 1952, to the Army Reserve)
- Reorganized and renamed on 6 April 1948, to the Reconnaissance Platoon of the 84th Airborne Division
- Reorganized and renamed on 29 March 1951, to the 84th Airborne Reconnaissance Company, assigned to the 84th Airborne Division
- Reorganized and renamed on 1 March 1952, to the 84th Reconnaissance Company, part of the 84th Infantry Division; location moved to Appleton, Wisconsin
- Location moved on 18 May 1953, to Wausau, Wisconsin
- Inactivated on 18 May 1959, in Wausau, Wisconsin; simultaneously reconstituted (excluding the 3rd Platoon) in the Regular Army as Headquarters and Headquarters Company of the 167th Infantry Brigade (the 3rd Platoon of the 84th Reconnaissance Company continued as a separate unit)
- Renamed on 21 June 1963, to Headquarters and Headquarters Company, 1st Brigade, 25th Infantry Division
- Activated on 26 August 1963, at Schofield Barracks, Hawaii
- Reorganized and renamed on 27 July 2005, to Headquarters and Headquarters Company, 1st Brigade, 25th Infantry Division
- Inactivated on 1 June 2006, at Fort Lewis, Washington
- Activated on 16 December 2006, at Fort Wainwright, Alaska
- Reorganized and renamed on 6 June 2022, to the 1st Brigade, 11th Airborne Division.
