= Manuel Pérez Jr. =

United States Army Medal of Honor recipient

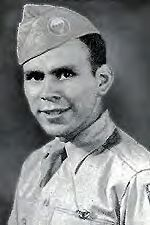
- PFC Manuel Perez Jr., Medal of Honor recipient
- Born: March 3, 1923; Oklahoma City, Oklahoma
- Died: March 14, 1945 (aged 22); Luzon, Commonwealth of the Philippines
- Burial place: Fairlawn Cemetery, Oklahoma City, Oklahoma
- Military career
- Allegiance: United States of America
- Branch: United States Army
- Service years: 1943–1945
- Rank: Private First Class
- Units: Company A, 511th Parachute Infantry Regiment, 11th Airborne Division
- Conflicts: World War II • Battle of Luzon
- Awards: Medal of Honor; Purple Heart

Private First Class Manuel Pérez Jr. (March 3, 1923 – March 14, 1945) was a United States Army soldier who posthumously received the Medal of Honor, the United States' highest military decoration, for his actions in Battle of Luzon during the Philippines campaign of World War II.

== Early years ==
Pérez was a Mexican-American born in Oklahoma City. As a young boy, he moved to Chicago, Illinois, where he was raised by his father, Manuel Pérez Sr., and his paternal grandmother. There he received his primary and secondary education. He worked for Best Foods before joining the United States Army upon the outbreak of World War II. After his basic training, the Army sent him to paratrooper school.

== World War II ==
Japanese forces had invaded the Philippine islands and had under its control all of the U.S. Military Installations including Fort William McKinley which was located just south of Manila the capital. Fort William McKinley was where USAFFE (United States Army Forces - Far East) had its headquarters for the Philippine Department and the Philippine Division. The bulk of the Philippine Division was stationed here and this was where, under the National Defense Act of 1935, specialized artillery training was conducted.

In 1945, Pérez was sent to the Philippines and assigned to Company A 511th Parachute Infantry, 11th Airborne Division whose mission was to take Fort William McKinley. On February 13, as the 11th Airborne Division approached the fort, it encountered a strong enemy fortified sector. The sector was composed of cement pillboxes armed with .50-caliber dual-purpose machineguns which defended the entrance to the fort.

Upon realizing that the pillboxes (Blockhouses) were preventing the advance of his division, Pérez took it upon himself to charge the fortifications and blast them away with grenades. Due to his actions, which resulted in 18 enemy deaths, his unit was able to advance.

A month later, while on the road to Santo Tomas in Southern Luzon, Private Perez was killed by a sniper.

== Medal of Honor citation ==
Manuel Pérez Jr. was posthumously awarded the Medal of Honor on December 27, 1945.

Citation

The President of the United States of America, in the name of Congress, takes pride in presenting the Medal of Honor (Posthumously) to Private First Class Manuel Perez, Jr., United States Army, for conspicuous gallantry and intrepidity in action above and beyond the call of duty on 13 February 1945, while serving with Company A, 511th Parachute Infantry Regiment, 11th Airborne Division. Private First Class Perez was lead scout for Company A, which had destroyed 11 of 12 pillboxes in a strongly fortified sector defending the approach to enemy-held Fort William McKinley on Luzon, Philippine Islands. In the reduction of these pillboxes, he killed five Japanese in the open and blasted others in pillboxes with grenades. Realizing the urgent need for taking the last emplacement, which contained two twin-mount .50-caliber dual-purpose machineguns, he took a circuitous route to within 20 yards of the position, killing four of the enemy in his advance. He threw a grenade into the pillbox, and, as the crew started withdrawing through a tunnel just to the rear of the emplacement, shot and killed four before exhausting his clip. He had reloaded and killed four more when an escaping Japanese threw his rifle with fixed bayonet at him. In warding off this thrust, his own rifle was knocked to the ground. Seizing the Jap rifle, he continued firing, killing two more of the enemy. He rushed the remaining Japanese, killed three of them with the butt of the rifle and entered the pillbox, where he bayoneted the one surviving hostile soldier. Single-handedly, he killed 18 of the enemy in neutralizing the position that had held up the advance of his entire company. Through his courageous determination and heroic disregard of grave danger, Private First Class Perez made possible the successful advance of his unit toward a valuable objective and provided a lasting inspiration for his comrades.

== Honors ==
Pérez was buried with full military honors at Fairlawn Cemetery which is located in Oklahoma City, Oklahoma. The state government of Illinois honored the memory of Perez by naming a plaza located in Chicago's Little Village Square and a school after him. The Department of the Army the reserve center of the 221st Unit Army Hospital in Oklahoma City, the Manuel Perez Jr Reserve Center.

== Date of death ==
His grave at Fairlawn Cemetery shows a date of death as March 14, 1945, a date found in the casualty list for the 511th PIR and division historian Lt. Gen. E.M. Flanagan.

== Awards and recognitions ==
Among Pérez's decorations and medals were the following:

Badge	Combat Infantryman Badge		
1st row	Medal of Honor		Bronze Star Medal
2nd row	Purple Heart	Army Good Conduct Medal	American Campaign Medal
3rd row	Asiatic-Pacific Campaign Medal with 1 Campaign star	World War II Victory Medal	Philippine Liberation Medal
Badge	Parachutist Badge		
Unit awards	Presidential Unit Citation		Philippine Presidential Unit Citation

== See also ==
- List of Medal of Honor recipients
- List of Medal of Honor recipients for World War II
- Hispanic Medal of Honor recipients
- Hispanic Americans in World War II
