= 541st Parachute Infantry Regiment =

- 541st Parachute Infantry Regiment's Airborne Background Trimming with Military Parachutist Badge
- Active: 12 August 1943 – July 1945
- Disbanded: July 1945-absorbed into 11th Airborne Division
- Country: United States
- Branch: United States Army
- Type: Airborne forces
- Role: Parachute infantry
- Size: Regiment
- Garrison/HQ: strategic reserve {US}
- Engagements: World War II

Commanders
- Current commander: Colonel Ducat M. McEntee

The 541st Parachute Infantry Regiment was an airborne infantry regiment of the United States Army, activated during World War II. While never destined to see combat the regiment was composed of highly trained and highly educated troopers. It was also utilized to send trained replacements overseas.

== The 541st Parachute Infantry Regiment Is Born ==
The 541st Parachute Infantry Regiment was activated 12 August 1943 at Fort Benning, Georgia, under the command of Colonel Ducat M. McEntee and his executive officer, Major Harley N. Trice. The unit was filled with men who had already completed Basic and Infantry Training but were yet to complete Jump School. The men who filled out the unit's ranks were of a high caliber, all had scored exceptionally well on their Army Entrance Exams; all were volunteers. One of the original members of the unit was famed 101st Airborne author Donald R. Burgett, who later participated in all the World War II battles of A Company 506th Parachute Infantry. Pvt. Burgett's first impressions of the 541st were to meet the Parachute School instructors who would take them through the four-week program, after a five-mile run and a full morning of calisthenics, men were already beginning to fall out.

The men completed Jump School as a unit, but not without casualties. One planeload of prospective paratroopers crashed in a ball of fire, killing all on board. Others, Pvt. Burgett included, suffered jump injuries that put a halt to their training until they were well enough to continue. After recovery they would catch up with the unit, which moved to Camp Mackall upon completing Parachute School.

== The Knollwood Maneuvers, North Carolina, December 1943 ==
By late December 1943 the Army High Command had become disenchanted with the idea of Parachute Troops, to the point where they were contemplating dissolving the existing Airborne Divisions in favor of independent Battalions, which could be attached to regular Divisions for use in sabotage and deception operations. The 82nd Airborne Division had jumped into Sicily at this point and a mixture of misdrops and friendly fire had the High Command concerned about the practicality of large-scale airdrops of troopers. General Dwight D. Eisenhower, later Overall Commander of the Allied Expeditionary Forces, famously said: "I do not believe in the Airborne Division..."

In order to decide whether to keep or disband the Airborne Units it was decided to hold a 2-week maneuver to assess the fate of Airborne Troops, this was the Knollwood Maneuvers. By this time the 541st was a part of the Strategic Reserve held in the United States. The Regiment was chosen alongside the 11th and 17th Airborne Divisions to participate in the Maneuvers. The future of Airborne Troops was resting on the shoulders of these men, and they approached the task with determination to preserve their branch of service.

Despite foul weather the maneuvers were a resounding success, and the future of Airborne Troopers was safe. The 541st performed particularly well, scoring high marks and making a good account of themselves.

However, despite their good performance and obviously being ready for movement overseas, the men of the 541st were still held in Reserve, watching as their counterparts in the 11th and 17th Airborne Divisions were deployed overseas. To further add to their disappointment the 541st was tasked with providing replacements for the 101st and 82nd Airborne Divisions overseas. As a result, many original members of the 541st were on hand to participate in the Invasion of Normandy.

== Strategic Reserve, USA ==
After the end of the Knollwood Maneuvers, training continued for the 541st. A new group of men came into the outfit, to replace those lost to units overseas, and the Regiment began a 13-week Airborne Infantry Training Cycle.

The Regiment moved back and forward between Fort Benning and Camp Mackall, demonstrating Airborne Tactics for dignitaries, developing new tactics and technique, and providing cadre for new Airborne Units being raised, like the 13th Airborne Division.

Then in July 1945 the Regiment was alerted for movement to the Pacific Theater of Operations, pending an assignment to the 11th Airborne Division.

== The Pacific Theater ==
The Regiment arrived at Manila in the Philippines waiting to be attached to the 11th Airborne, which was preparing to Jump on the Japanese Homeland. However much to the disappointment of the men of the 541st, the Regiment was deactivated and absorbed into the 11th Airborne ranks.

The 541st, after three years of dedication and waiting, was no more.

Soon thereafter the Atomic Bomb was dropped, and the Second World War came to an end. The 11th Airborne Division moved to Mainland Japan as an occupation force, taking the men of the former 541st with it.
