= 2nd Mobile Brigade Combat Team (Airborne), 11th Airborne Division =

Active US Army formation

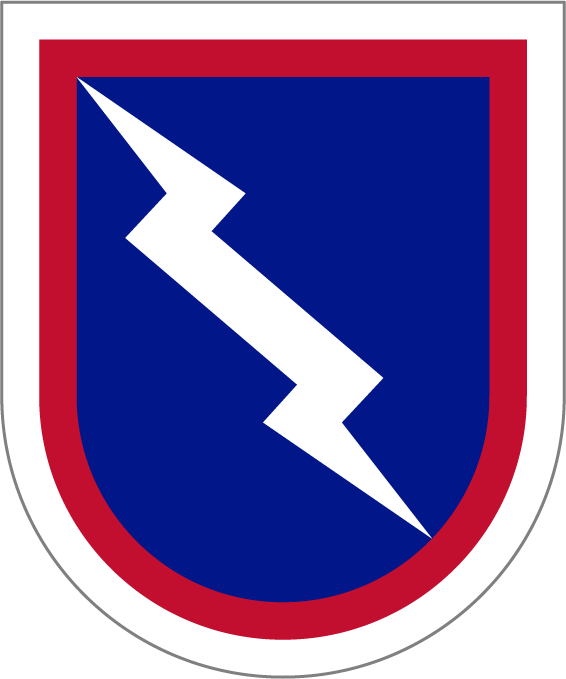
- 2nd Mobile Brigade Combat Team, 11th Airborne Division Beret Flash
- Active: 2005 – present
- Country: United States of America
- Branch: United States Army
- Type: Airborne infantry
- Part of: 11th Airborne Division
- Garrison/HQ: Joint Base Elmendorf-Richardson, Anchorage, Alaska
- Nickname: Spartans
- Motto: "Sparta Lives"
- Engagements: Operation Iraqi Freedom; Operation Enduring Freedom; Operation Joint Guardian

Commanders
- Current commander: COL James Howell

Insignia
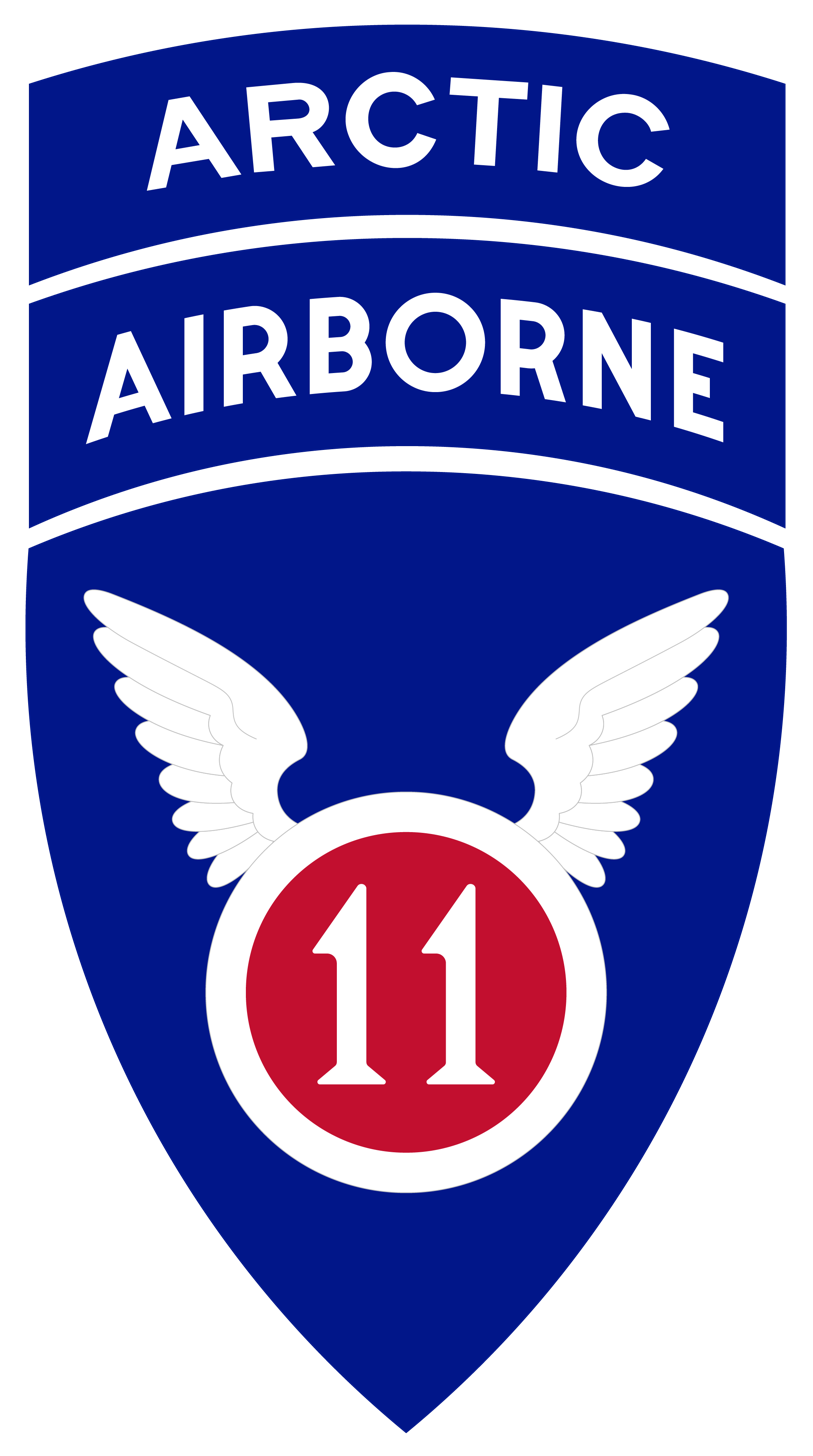
- 11th Airborne Division Shoulder Sleeve Insignia, worn by the brigade

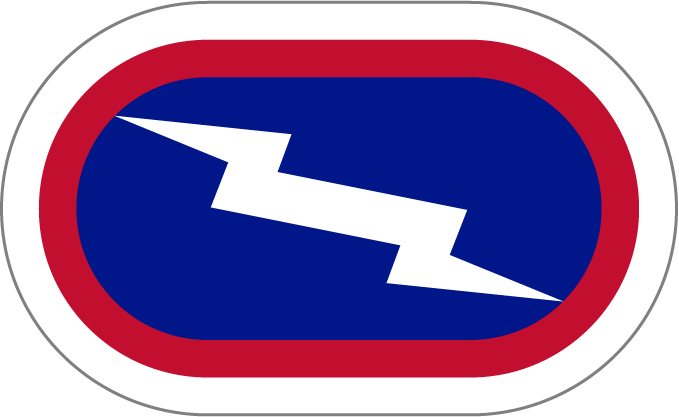
- Brigade headquarters' airborne background trimming

The 2nd Mobile Brigade Combat Team (Airborne), 11th Airborne Division is a modern airborne mobile infantry brigade combat team (MBCT) of the United States Army. The unit is stationed at Joint Base Elmendorf-Richardson in Anchorage, Alaska and is the only airborne brigade combat team which is part of United States Army Pacific. It is also the newest airborne Infantry MBCT and one of only five in the United States Army; the others are the three airborne infantry BCTs of the 82nd Airborne Division and the 173rd Airborne Brigade.

The brigade began its history as the 4th Infantry BCT (Airborne), 25th Infantry Division. But its higher headquarters was United States Army Alaska (redesignated 11th Airborne Division on 6 June 2022) not the 25th Infantry Division which is headquartered in Hawaii. The brigade, along with 1st Stryker BCT, 25th ID, which is also stationed in Alaska, shared in the history of the 25th ID, but was not subordinate to the 25th ID headquarters; the chain of command went directly from United States Army Alaska to United States Army Pacific. On 6 June 2022, the 1st Stryker BCT and 4th Infantry BCT(A), 25th ID were transferred to the reactivated 11th Airborne Division as part of the US Army's new arctic strategy and to help boost morale among units stationed in Alaska. These two brigades have been redesignated 1st Infantry BCT and 2nd Infantry BCT(A) respectively.

== Organization ==
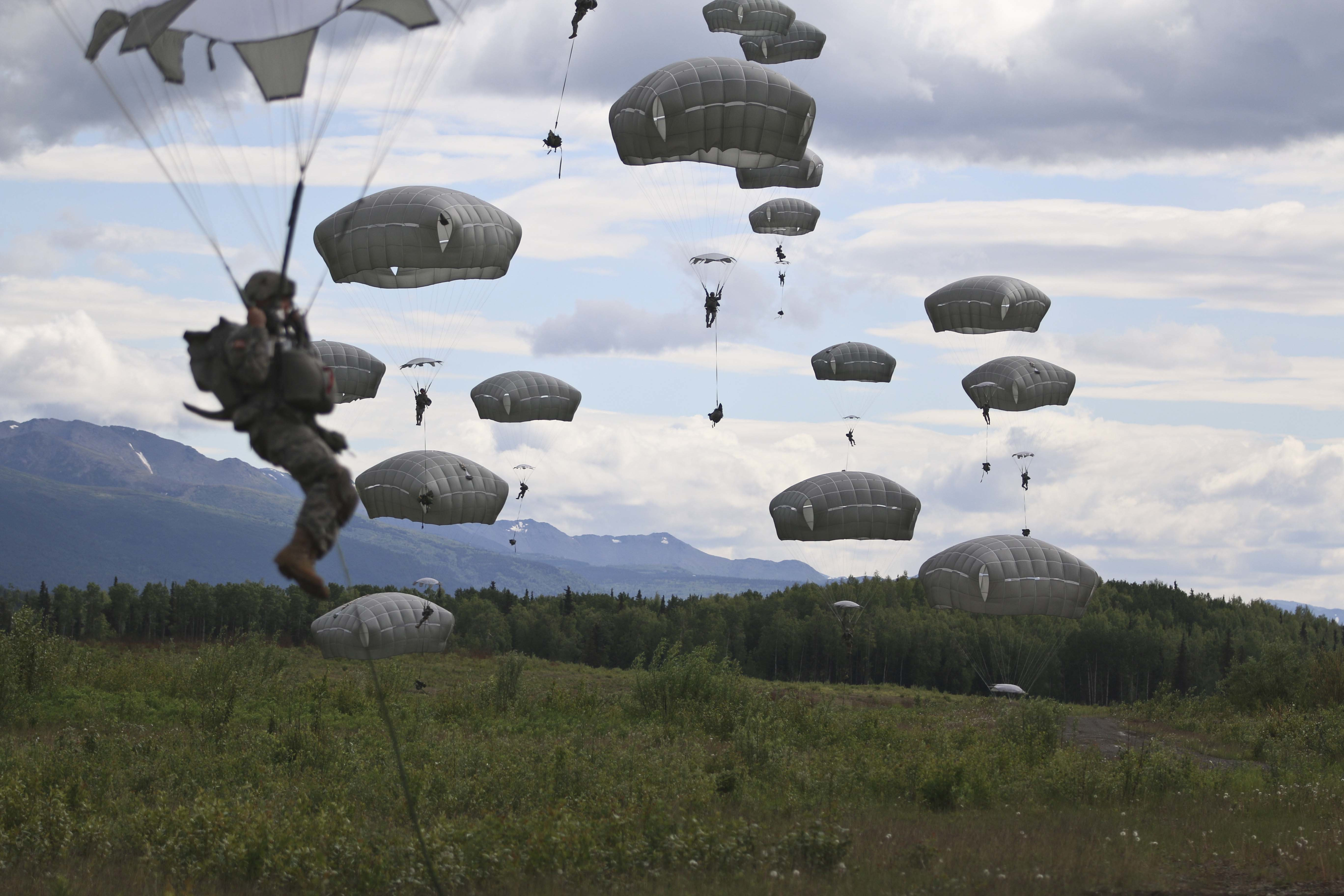
4th Infantry BCT(A) land by parachute in Alaska during Exercise Arctic Aurora, 2016

2nd Mobile Brigade Combat Team (Airborne) "Spartans", 11th Airborne Division, (2nd MBCT(A), at Fort Richardson, Alaska)

- Headquarters and Headquarters Company
- 1st Battalion, 511th Infantry Regiment "Strength From Above"
- 1st Battalion, 501st Infantry Regiment "Geronimo"
- 3rd Battalion, 509th Infantry Regiment "All the Way"
- 2nd Battalion, 377th Field Artillery Regiment "Spartan Steel"
- 725th Brigade Support Battalion "Centurion"

== History ==
The 4th Brigade was first activated on 6 December 1969 at Schofield Barracks, Hawaii, to replace the 29th Infantry Brigade, a Hawaii Army National Guard unit that was being released from active duty, but inactivated on 15 December 1970 and reflagged as the 1st Brigade when that unit returned from Vietnam.

In 2004, the United States Army announced the Army Modernization Plan, intended to restructure the U.S. Army by creating new modular brigade combat teams. A new airborne brigade combat team at Fort Richardson, Alaska was included as part of the restructuring. The new brigade was established as the fourth brigade under the lineage of the 25th Infantry Division and the first new U.S. airborne unit created since the end of World War II. The 1st Battalion, 501st Infantry Regiment (Airborne) then operating as a battalion task force and located at Fort Richardson was consolidated with the new brigade. The battalion served as a flagship unit, providing senior personnel and a training cadre for the other units of the brigade. On 14 July 2005 the brigade was officially constituted at the athletic fields of Buckner Field House, with COL Michael X. Garrett becoming the first brigade commander. At the ceremony, he officially christened the "Spartan Brigade" with the new motto "Sparta Lives."

The brigade spent the remainder of 2005 and 2006 achieving full personnel strength and conducting training for future combat deployment. The first major training exercise was conducted at Fort Greely, Alaska in April 2006 and was followed by pre-deployment certification at the US Army Joint Readiness Training Center at Fort Polk, Louisiana in August of the same year. During the same month the fall deployment of the brigade to Iraq was announced.

=== Operation Iraqi Freedom ===
In late September and early October the brigade began deployment in support Operation Iraqi Freedom V for a 12-month rotational deployment. Initially, the brigade was subordinate to Multi-National Division-Baghdad under the 1st Cavalry Division and was responsible for an area of operations comprising north Babil Governorate, Karbala Governorate and Najaf Governorate. However, in January 2007, a battalion task force headed by 3rd Battalion, 509th Infantry Regiment (Airborne) was detached for service in Anbar Governorate with the II Marine Expeditionary Force. The unit would not return to brigade control until June 2007. In March 2007, the brigade deployment was extended for a period of 90 days and the brigade was placed under the divisional command of the then new Multi-National Division-Central under the command of 3rd Infantry Division. During this period, the geographic disparity of 1st Squadron (Airborne), 40th Cavalry Regiment located just eight miles south of Baghdad brought about their detachment from the brigade and attachment to 2nd Brigade Combat Team, 3rd Infantry Division for the duration of the deployment.

Over 14 months of combat and civil operations in the brigade area of operations resulted in improvement of the security situation, a period that coincided with the Iraq Surge and Sons of Iraq movement. Although the brigade had trained in conventional and direct action missions prior to deployment, the brigade conducted many traditionally unconventional operations, specifically the training of foreign internal defense forces and the support and utilization of irregular forces in combat and intelligence operations. The brigade also boasted the highest rate of re-enlistment of any brigade in the US Army during fiscal year 2007.

Under Multi-National Division-Central, the brigade took part in several major operations including Black Eagle, Gecko, Geronimo Strike III, Marne Avalanche, Marne Torch, LaGuardia, and Washing Machine. The brigade also successfully returned Karbala Governorate to Iraqi provincial control. Elements of the brigade took part in the search for downed F-16 pilot MAJ Troy Gilbert and the soldiers abducted in the May 2007 ambush of a patrol from 2nd Brigade Combat Team, 10th Mountain Division, successfully recovering the remains of PFC Joseph Anzack. Soldiers from the brigade were also involved in the 20 January 2007 Karbala provincial headquarters raid. During the 15-month deployment, the brigade lost 53 soldiers who are commemorated on a black stone memorial at Pershing Field on Fort Richardson.

The brigade began redeployment to Fort Richardson beginning in November 2007 and was completely redeployed by December. The brigade conducted a redeployment ceremony attended by Governor Sarah Palin and other dignitaries on 19 December 2007 at Sullivan Arena in Anchorage. In June 2008, COL Michael Garrett relinquished command to LTC Stephen Hughes as the unit began the process of undergoing rest and refit in advance of future deployments.

=== Operation Enduring Freedom IX-X ===
Col. Michael L. Howard assumed command in July 2008. With the brigade already identified for deployment to Afghanistan in support of Operation Enduring Freedom IX-X, COL Howard led a rapid train-up including a month-long rotation at the National Training Center in October–November 2008.

In February 2009, just 14 months after returning from its 15-month deployment to Iraq, the brigade deployed to eastern Afghanistan as a part of Regional Command East, International Security Assistance Force. The brigade's area of combat operations included Khost, Paktia, and Paktika provinces, all on the border with Pakistan; brigade headquarters was at Forward Operating Base Salerno in Khost. Known as Task Force Yukon, the brigade was augmented with eight battalion-sized units: Headquarters and Headquarters Detachment (HHD), 709th MP BN from United States Army Europe, augmented with soldiers from Company B, 2nd Battalion, 151st Infantry Regiment from the Indiana Army National Guard) (for FOB Salerno base defense and security operations in Khost province), an infantry battalion (1st Battalion, 121st Infantry Regiment) from the Georgia Army National Guard, an aviation battalion from the 101st Airborne Division (replaced mid-tour with an aviation battalion from the 3rd Infantry Division), three Provincial Reconstruction Teams, and two Army National Guard Agri-Business Development Teams. Total task force strength was approximately 5,500 personnel. Serving under the 101st Airborne Division, then the 82nd Airborne Division, the brigade conducted counter-insurgency operations for 12 months in partnership with Afghan National Security Forces and supervised governance, development, and agriculture projects in coordination with the Afghan government.

The brigade redeployed to Fort Richardson in February–March 2010. The welcome home ceremony was held on 25 March 2010 at the Sullivan Arena in Anchorage with Alaska Governor Sean Parnell in attendance. Thirteen brigade Soldiers were killed in action during the deployment; they are honored with a black granite memorial located in front of the brigade headquarters at Fort Richardson. SPC Bowe Bergdahl, assigned to B Company, 1st Battalion, 501st Infantry Regiment (Airborne), was held captive by the Taliban from June 2009 to June 2014.

On 1 July 2010, COL Howard relinquished command to LTC Shanon Mosakowski, the brigade's deputy commander. MG William Troy, commanding general of United States Army Alaska, hosted the change of command ceremony, which included a traditional pass and review with the brigade's six battalions represented by large formations on the field. COL Howard's next assignment was with NATO headquarters in Belgium. LTC Mosakowski served as commander until August 2010 when COL Morris T. Goins assumed command.

=== Operation Enduring Freedom XII-XIII ===
COL Morris T. Goins assumed command in August 2010 with the brigade once again identified for deployment to Afghanistan in support of Operation Enduring Freedom XII-XIII, COL Goins led a rapid retrofit and train-up prior to the deployment.

In December 2011, the brigade deployed again to eastern Afghanistan as a part of Regional Command East, International Security Assistance Force. The brigade's area of combat operations included Khost, Paktia, and Paktika provinces, all on the border with Pakistan. The brigade headquarters was at Forward Operating Base Salerno in Khost. Known as Task Force Spartan, the brigade was augmented with two battalion-sized units: the 4th Brigade Combat Team, 1st Infantry Division, an aviation battalion from the 82nd Airborne Division, two Provincial Reconstruction Teams, and two Army National Guard Agri-Business Development Teams. Total task force strength was approximately 4,500 personnel. Serving under the 1st Cavalry Division, then the 1st Infantry Division, the brigade conducted counter-insurgency operations for 10 months in partnership with Afghan National Security Forces and supervised governance, development, and agriculture projects in coordination with the Afghan government. The brigade redeployed to Fort Richardson in October 2012. Eight brigade Soldiers were killed in action during the deployment.

Col. Morris T. Goins relinquished command of the 4th Brigade Combat Team (Airborne), 25th Infantry Division to Col. Matthew W. McFarlane in December 2012.

=== Operation Joint Guardian ===
4th Infantry BCT(A) conduct Arctic jump into Exercise Spartan Pegasus, 2017 (4:51)

Upon its return home in early May 2014 from a Joint Readiness Training Center rotation, the brigade was given short notice to prepare for a deployment to Kosovo in September in support of Operation Joint Guardian, the U.S. Army's contribution to NATO's Kosovo Force mission. On 28 September 2014 approximately half of the brigade's headquarters staff along with the brigade's 1st Squadron, 40th Cavalry Regiment deployed from Joint Base Elmendorf-Richardson to Nuremberg, Germany and was transported to the Joint Multinational Readiness Center in Hohenfels for a two-week validation exercise prior to onward movement to Kosovo. While in Germany the brigade was augmented by individuals and smaller units primarily from the Army National Guard's 35th Infantry Division and the active duty Army's 62nd Medical Brigade. Its exercise complete, the brigade and its complement arrived in Kosovo on 16 October where it assumed command of Multinational Battle Group-East in Ferizaj at Camp Bondsteel on 24 October, while 1–40 CAV found itself based at Camp Maréchal de Lattre de Tassigny just south of Mitrovica. Commanding MNBG-E was Colonel Clint Baker, who previously served as U.S. Army Alaska's operations officer; Col. Baker's senior enlisted advisor was Command Sergeant Major Mitchell Rucker followed by Idelfonso Barraza. For the next nine months MNBG-E (or KFOR-19 as it was known in NATO lingo) conducted various mounted, dismounted and airborne operations throughout its sector in order to maintain a safe and secure environment with the majority of its operations conducted alongside the Kosovo Police, Kosovo Border Patrol and Kosovo Security Force. After nine months of sustained operations the brigade and its attachments were relieved in place by the 30th Armored Brigade Combat Team on 9 July 2015.

=== Operation Freedom's Sentinel/Resolute Support ===
Paratroopers with the 4th IBCT(A), 25th ID, U.S. Army Alaska, conducted a Joint Forcible Entry Operation into Andersen Air Force Base, Guam, 29 June, 2020.

Most of the brigade deployed to Afghanistan in support of Operation Freedom's Sentinel and Resolute Support Mission from September 2017 to June 2018. On 14 August 2017, COL Jason J. Jones assumed command of the Spartan Brigade from COL Jeffrey S. Crapo. On September 8, 2017, COL Jason Jones and CSM Robert Duenas cased the colors signaling the brigade's return to Afghanistan. COL Mark Colbrook, U.S. Army Alaska Deputy Commander, hosted the casing of the colors with guest speaker Senator Dan Sullivan (R-AK) providing motivating words about the brigade.

The brigade deployed to eastern Afghanistan as part of Operation Resolute Support to conduct the Train, Advise, and Assist mission and Operation Freedom Sentinel and to provide needed support to Special Forces and operators within the region. The brigade deployed paratroopers to 25 different locations throughout Afghanistan to support and further legitimize the Afghan National Defense and Security Forces (ANDSF) and its partners to secure the Train, Advise, Assist Command-East region and the seven provinces of Task Force Southeast against terrorist threats from the likes of the Taliban and Islamic State Khurasan.

The complexity of the mission required a diverse staff and organization of units, thus Task Force Spartan was formed to accomplish both unique mission sets. The brigades organic units, formed five separate battalion task forces: 1st Battalion, 501st Parachute Infantry Regiment (Task Force 1 Geronimo) which exercised tactical control of a small Polish Army contingent and the Police Advisory Team, 3rd Battalion, 509th Infantry (Airborne) (Task Force 3 Geronimo), 2nd Battalion, 377th Parachute Field Artillery Regiment (Task Force Steel), 1st Squadron, 40th Cavalry Regiment (Task Force Denali) and augmented by 1st Battalion, 87th Infantry Regiment (Task Force Summit) from 10th Mountain Division. Task Force Spartan commanded paratroopers, sailors, Marines, airmen, coalition forces and contracted personnel in 25 different locations across Afghanistan.

Serving under the 3rd Infantry Division, the brigade conducted the Train, Advise, and Assist mission as well as counter-insurgency operations for 9 months in partnership with Afghan National Security Forces and advised Corps level leadership to assist them legitimize the military and police of Afghanistan in coordination with the Afghan government.

In nine months, the brigade made improvements to population control in the TAAC-E and Task Force Southeast regions increasing the overall stability and legitimizing and enabling the local Afghan government to further establish sovereignty across the region. The support to the 201st Corps Selab and 202nd Zone Afghan National Police.

Task Force Denali, as part of Task Force Southeast, spearheaded the expansion of Advisory Platform Lightning in Gardez, Paktiya and the re-establishment of Forward Operating Base Shank in Baraki Barak, and Logar. Task Force Denali Paratroopers synchronized efforts across the warfighting functions to establish initial security for joint engineering efforts, build combat power from a Troop to a 1,500-person Task Force and ultimately enable the employment of the 1st Security Force Assistance Brigade across the seven provinces of Task Force Southeast.

The brigade established the foundation and planned the integration of the first Security Force Assistance Brigade in the TAAC-E and Task Force Southeast regions, further improving the capabilities of both the coalition and host nation forces throughout GIRoA. Spartan Janus, a detailed Counterintelligence Screening process to vet out potential threats to mission and ensured advising success was conducted from January 2018 through the arrival of the SFAB at TAAC-E and Task Force Southeast. The detailed synchronization plan laid out by Task Force Spartan set the conditions for the future of the advising mission in Afghanistan and potential areas of conflict for years to come.

Of the contributions during the campaign, the Spartan Brigade achieved joint success alongside the Afghan police and military forces supported by coalition forces to regain control and set conditions for the 2018 elections during Spartan Nike. The coordinated operation focused on the regaining population control in the Alingar district and set conditions for future operations in the TAAC-East area of operations.

=== Redesignation ===
In a May 5, 2022 Senate Armed Services Committee hearing, Secretary of the Army Christine Wormuth announced that in the summer of 2022, the U.S. Army Alaska headquarters would be redesignated as the 11th Airborne Division, and the two Brigade Combat Teams in Alaska, the 1st Brigade Combat Team and 4th Brigade Combat Team 25th Infantry Division, would be redesignated as the 1st and 2nd Brigade Combat Teams of the 11th Airborne Division respectively.

On June 6, 2022, during a separate ceremony from its sister brigade in Fort Wainwright, the unit officially reflagged to the 2nd Infantry Brigade Combat Team (Airborne), 11th Airborne Division.

== Lineage and honors ==
=== Lineage ===
- Constituted 6 December 1969 in the Regular Army as Headquarters and Headquarters Company, 4th Brigade, 25th Infantry Division and activated at Schofield Barracks, Hawaii
- Inactivated 15 December 1970 at Schofield Barracks, Hawaii
- Headquarters, 4th Brigade, 25th Infantry Division, redesignated 16 July 2005 as Headquarters, 4th Brigade Combat Team, 25th Infantry Division, and activated at Fort Richardson, Alaska (Headquarters Company, 4th Brigade, 25th Infantry Division – hereafter separate lineage)

=== Campaign participation credit ===
- War on Terrorism: Campaigns to be determined
  - Afghanistan: Consolidation II, Consolidation III, Transition I
  - Iraq: National Resolution, Iraqi Surge

Note: The published US Army lineage lists "Campaigns to be determined" as of 14 December 2011. Comparison of the BCT's deployment dates with War on Terrorism campaigns shows that the BCT is entitled to the 5 campaigns listed.

=== Decorations ===
- Meritorious Unit Commendation (Army), Streamer embroidered AFGHANISTAN 2009–2010
- Meritorious Unit Commendation (Army), Streamer embroidered AFGHANISTAN 2011–2012
- Army Superior Unit Award, Streamer embroidered KOSOVO 2014–2015

Note: official published lineage as of 14 December 2011 lists only a single MUC. DA General Orders 2014–64, published 22 August 2014, awards a second MUC. Streamer embroidering is an estimate.

== Past Commanders ==
- COL Michael X. Garrett (2005–2008)
- COL Michael L. Howard (2008–2010)
- COL Morris T. Goins (2010–2012)
- COL Matthew W. McFarlane (2012–2014)
- COL Scott A. Green (2014–2017)
- COL Paul L. Larson (2017–2017)
- COL Jason J. Jones (August 2017 – June 2019)
- COL Christopher S. Landers (June 2019 – July 2021)
- COL Michael "Jody" Shouse (July 2021– June 2023)
