= United States Army Alaska =

Formerly the ground element of the U.S. Alaskan Command (1994–2022)

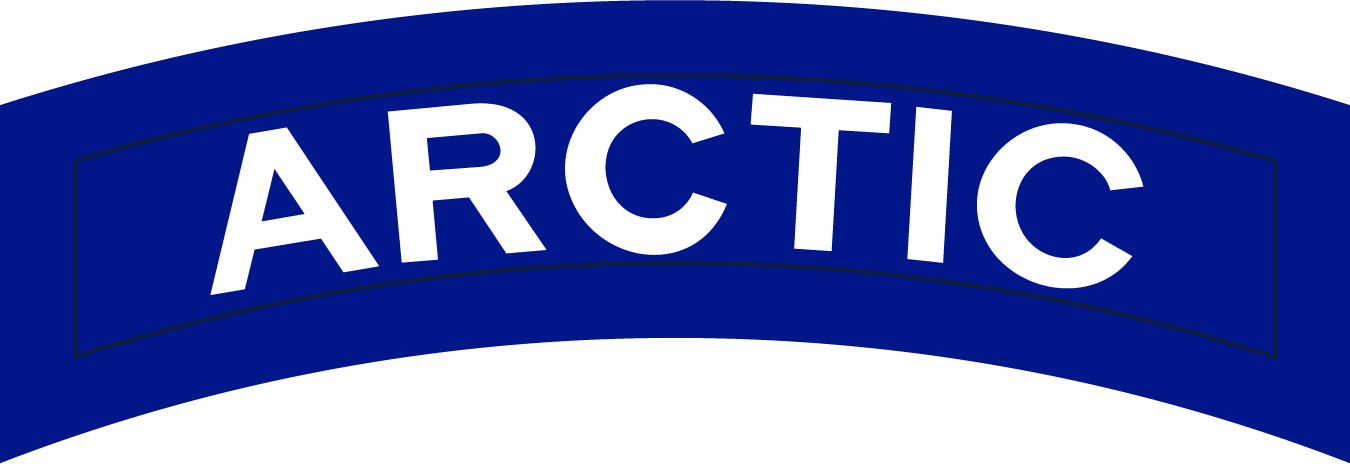
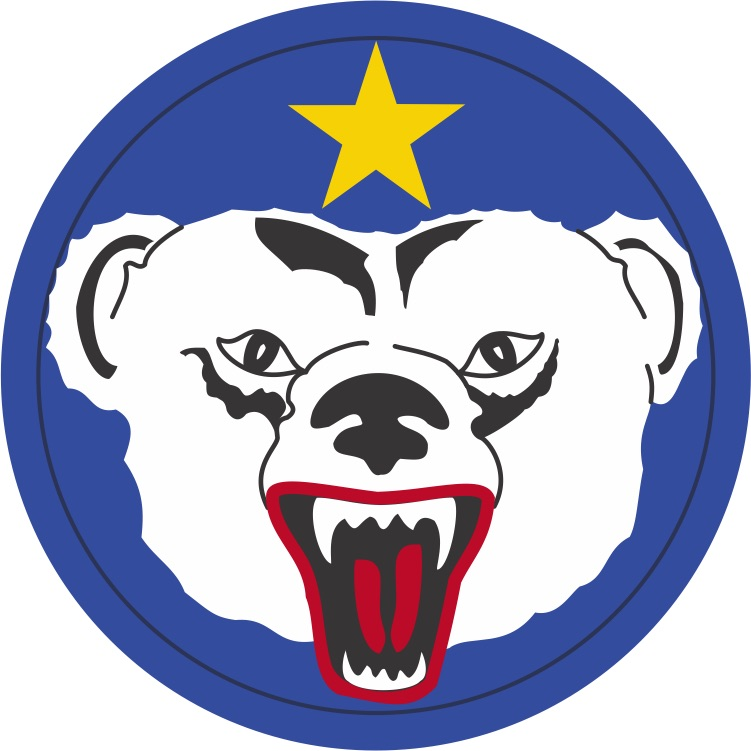
- Shoulder sleeve insignia
- Active: 1994—2022
- Country: United States
- Branch: United States Army
- Role: Arctic Warfare
- Part of: I Corps; Alaskan Command
- Garrison/HQ: Fort Richardson
- Nickname: America's Arctic Warriors (Special Designation)
- Motto: "Arctic Tough!"
- March: United States Army Alaska March
- Engagements: Operation Inherent Resolve; War in Afghanistan
- Website: https://home.army.mil/alaska/index.php

Commanders
- Final Commander: Major General Brian Eifler
- Command Sergeant Major: Command Sergeant Major Vern B. Daley

Insignia
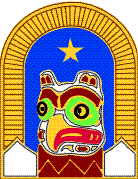
- Distinctive unit insignia

- USARPAC Early–Entry Command Post Beret Flash, mission assigned to USARAK HQ

- Early–Entry Command Post Airborne Background Trimming

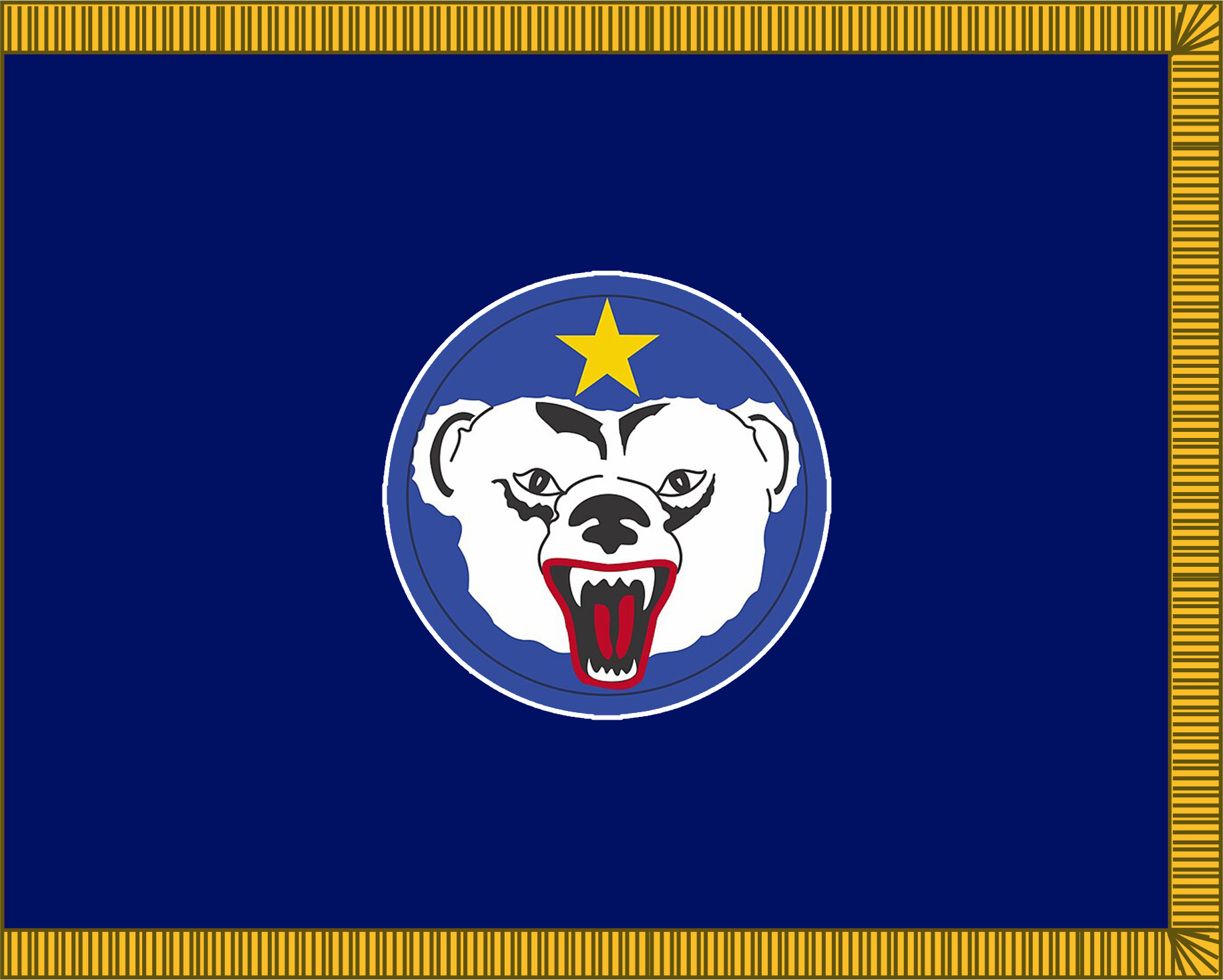
- US Army Alaska Flag

The United States Army Alaska (USARAK or "America's Arctic Warriors") was a military command of the United States Army located in the U.S. state of Alaska. A subordinate command of I Corps, USARAK was the ground element of the Alaskan Command. USARAK was headquartered at Joint Base Elmendorf-Richardson and commanded by a major general. USARAK was reflagged as the 11th Airborne Division on June 6, 2022.

== Early Army involvement in Alaska ==
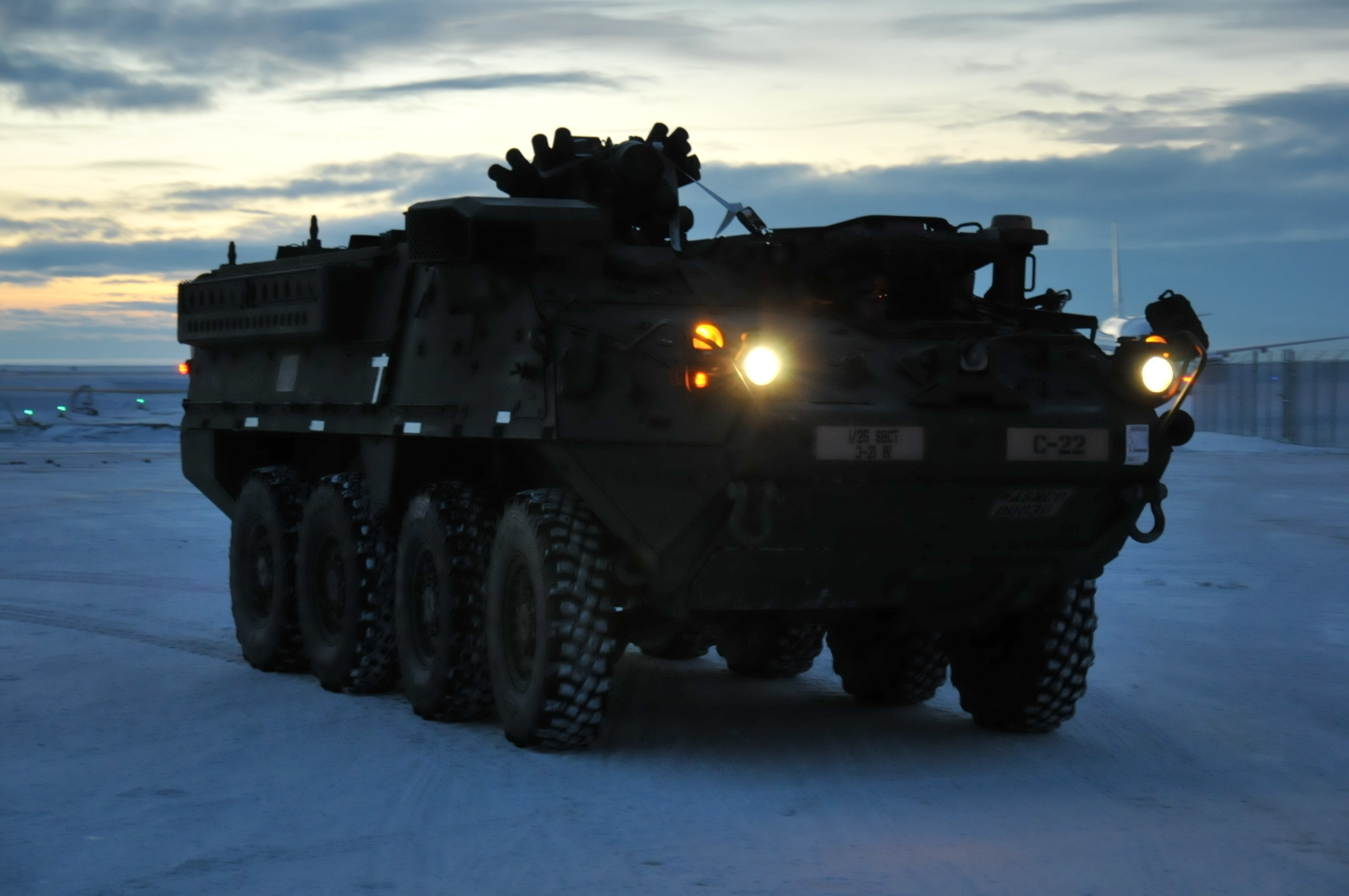
A U.S. Army Alaska Stryker from Bravo Company, 3-21 Infantry Regiment, 1st Stryker Brigade Combat Team during Operation Arctic Pegasus at Deadhorse, Alaska, 3 November 2015.

The U.S. Army's important history in the Great Land began at the very moment Alaska became American soil on 18 October 1867. Elements of the 9th Infantry were on hand as the Russian Golden Eagle was lowered and the Stars and Stripes were raised in Sitka, which then became headquarters for the Alaska Military District.

Charged with maintaining law and order in the new territory, U.S. Army soldiers helped quell uprisings and built new forts at Wrangell, St. Paul Canal, Kodiak Island, and on the Kenai Peninsula. They also enforced regulations regarding the killing of fur seals, whose population had been severely depleted during the Russian reign.

The Army in Alaska, numbering only a few hundred, became increasingly unpopular due to their idleness and failure to contain the illegal supplying of guns and alcohol to natives, with some soldiers even helping facilitate the trade. Over 20 percent of Alaska's Army garrison was court martialed from 1868-1869 alone, and in 1870, their budget was cut drastically, and all military posts except Sitka were shut down.

The Army relinquished control of Alaska to the U.S. Treasury Department in 1877 with the closing of Sitka, but did not entirely leave the territory. The Signal Corps operated weather stations, and a number of officers led small geographic explorations to learn more about the territory. These expeditions into various parts of Alaska continued through the turn of the 20th century, as mapmaking and road and bridge building expanded the frontier. The Klondike Gold Rush in Yukon Territory, Canada, and later gold rushes in Alaska helped that expansion, as thousands of people poured into Alaska.

== Early 20th Century ==
Although the Royal Canadian Mounted Police maintained law and order in the Yukon during the Gold Rush, the U.S. government, after sending Captain Patrick H. Ray and First Lieutenant Wilds P. Richardson to study the situation, did not deem it necessary to send the Army into Alaska as peacekeepers. Despite this, with the absence of the army for over twenty years, soldiers once again returned to Alaska and established more than a dozen posts by 1900.

As more and more people came into Alaska and northwestern Canada, the need for better communications with the lower 48 states became critical. The Washington-Alaska Military Cable and Telegraph System (WAMCATS) connected all the forts in the territory with Seattle. By 1903, the line stretched from Seattle to southeastern Alaska, Valdez, the interior, and Nome. The project fell under the direction of Brigadier General Adolphus W. Greely. Lieutenant William "Billy" Mitchell, another officer who would later achieve military fame, also worked on the four-year project.

While Greely and his men struggled to complete the WAMCATS project, Richardson, on his third tour of duty in Alaska, headed the Alaska Road Commission, building garrisons and trails in south-central Alaska. The Army in Alaska saw a decline in activity from 1908 to 1939, with a brief surge during World War I. Work continued building roads and bridges and improving trails during this period.

== Alaska during World War II ==
Military construction in Alaska accelerated in 1940 as the world prepared for another great war. Ladd Field, near Fairbanks, was built as a cold-weather test station and Fort Richardson, named for Wilds P. Richardson, was built near Anchorage. Colonel Simon B. Buckner assumed command of the Alaska Defense Force in 1940, achieving the rank of major general during his following three-year tenure in what evolved into the Alaska Department.

Through the Lend-Lease program, the United States transferred nearly 8,000 aircraft to the Soviet Union at Ladd Field, which later became Fort Wainwright. The aircraft were flown from Great Falls, Montana, to Ladd Field by American crews. Russian crews then flew the planes to Siberia and on to the Russian Front. The pilots leaving Great Falls followed a series of small airfields that became known as the Northwest Staging Route. One of those airfields, Big Delta Airfield, later became Fort Greely, providing ample acreage large scale training exercises, northern warfare training and extreme cold weather testing.

Following the Japanese attack on Pearl Harbor in 1941, Army and Navy engineers began building airstrips in the Aleutian Islands to defend against possible Japanese attacks. U.S. Army units also built an initial pioneer road in 1942 for the Alaska-Canada (ALCAN) Highway in less than eight months. In 1943, civilian contractors followed and constructed a more permanent, all-weather highway. The 1,420-mile road was built as an overland supply route to get personnel and equipment to Alaska. The ALCAN Highway complemented military infrastructure that was built throughout Alaska than ensured Allied forces could defend the territory and carry the fight to the enemy, if necessary.

Alaska was the only American soil on which ground fighting occurred during World War II; the Aleutian Islands Campaign began following the Japanese bombing of Dutch Harbor and seizure of Attu and Kiska islands in the Aleutian Chain in June 1942. The successful battle by the U.S. to retake Attu in May 1943 was proportionately one of the most costly amphibious assaults of World War II in the American and Pacific theaters in terms of American casualties suffered. The Japanese secretly evacuated Kiska in late-July 1943, several weeks prior to U.S. and Canadian forces seizing the island in mid-August 1943. At the end of the war, most Army installations throughout the state closed permanently or transferred to other agencies. Postwar emphasis turned to training.

== Post World War II: USARAL ==
The Alaskan Command (ALCOM) was created in January 1947. As the first Unified Command under the Department of Defense, ALCOM was headquartered at Elmendorf Air Force Base near Anchorage where it controlled all military forces in Alaska.

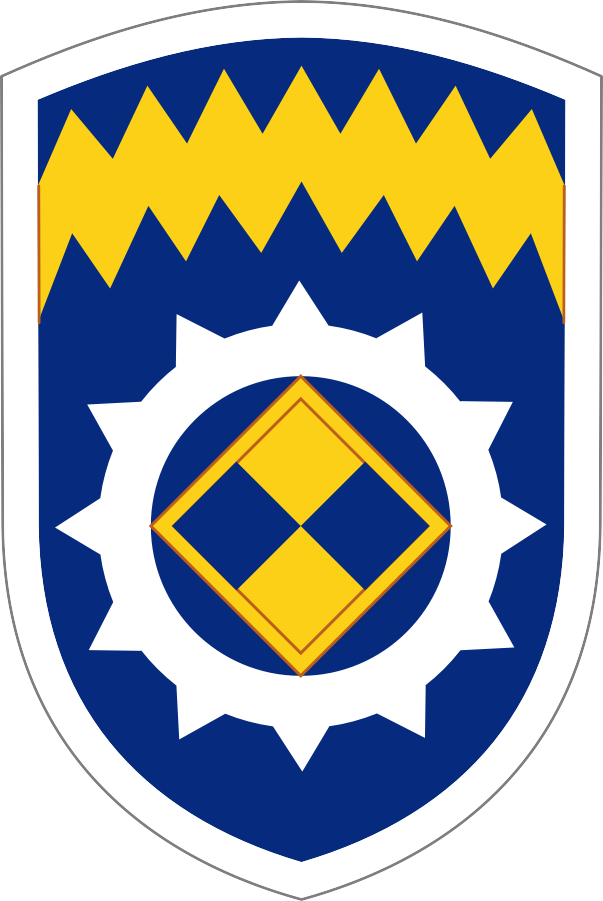
Alaska (USARAL) Support Command 1960-1972

The Alaskan Department changed its name again in 1947. The new name for the headquarters for all Army personnel in Alaska became U.S. Army Alaska, or USARAL. Military missions assigned to USARAL included ground and air defense of Alaska, with priority to the Anchorage and Fairbanks areas; development of cold-weather and mountain-warfare doctrines; conducting a cold-weather and mountain school at Fort Greely; providing logistical support to Air Force and Navy elements in Alaska; conducting National Guard and U.S. Army Reserve training; supervising Reserve Officer Training Corps activities; and, providing internal security, including plans for recovery from nuclear attack. In 1960 USARAL activated the Alaska Support Command at Fort Richardson to control all army supply and maintenance there and at Wildwood Station and the Port of Whittier. By 1959, several Nike Hercules missile battalions were activated in the Anchorage and Fairbanks areas which operated under the last unit inactivated in 1979.

The Army established the Yukon Command at Ladd Air Force Base as a component of the U.S. Army Alaska (USARAL) with the mission of point defense of U.S. military installations north of the Alaska Range. Consequently, infantry and anti-aircraft units comprised most of the Army presence at Ladd AFB during the 1950s. Elements of the 4th Regimental Combat Team arrived at Ladd AFB in 1950, and the 1st Battle Group, 9th "Manchu" Infantry Regiment took its place in 1956. At some time by December 1957, the 1st Battle Group, 9th "Manchu" Infantry was split between Ladd AFB and Eielson AFB, with the headquarters being at Eielson AFB and some of the line companies (C Company, for one) remaining at Ladd AFB. That configuration remained until at least December 1959. The 4th AAA Group was stationed at Ladd until 1958. In 1959, a NIKE battalion equipped with nuclear-capable Nike Hercules surface-to-air missiles (SAMs) took over the interior defense mission.

Later two battalions of Nike missiles were stationed in Alaska: 4th Battalion (later 1st Battalion), 43rd Air Defense Artillery Regiment, and 2d Battalion, 562nd Air Defense Artillery Regiment. The two battalions and their direct support ordnance companies fell under the command of the USARAL Artillery Group, headquartered at Fort Richardson. The Group was directly responsible to the USARAL Commanding General for Army participation in the air defense of Alaska, which involved Nike Hercules batteries, fighter interceptors, and the associated early warning radars and communications systems.

In 1964 the USARAL Air Defense Artillery Group, composed of two Nike-Hercules missile battalions, was activated and moved its offices from Building 1 to building 656, Fort Richardson. The USARAL Air Defense Artillery Group was renamed the 87th Artillery Group (Air Defense) in January 1968. 4/43 ADA defended Anchorage (which would have included the battery at Site Summit) while 2-562 ADA provided area defense around Fairbanks. 4/43 ADA was redesignated as the 1st Battalion, 43rd Air Defense Artillery in 1971. It was at that time that the 2/562 ADA was deactivated. In March 1971 the Department of the Army announced its decision to close the remaining Fairbanks area missile sites of the 2/562 Artillery, the 166th Ordnance, and the 87th Artillery Group by the end of June 1971.

On April 3, 1961, the Aviation Detachment was upgraded into the USARAL Aviation Battalion, at Fort Wainwright. On July 1, 1964, it received its official colours from the Department of the Army and became the 19th Aviation Battalion.

In July 1963, USARAL's combat units were divided into the 172nd Infantry Brigade (Mechanized) at Fort Richardson and the 171st Infantry Brigade (Mechanized) at Fort Wainwright. The two brigades were re-designated as Light Infantry Brigades in 1969.

== Home of the 6th Infantry Division ==
USARAL was discontinued as a major subordinate command on 31 December 1972, and the 172nd Infantry Brigade (Alaska), headquartered at Fort Richardson, assumed command and control, reporting to U.S. Army Forces Command at Fort McPherson, Georgia. The 171st Infantry Brigade was inactivated in 1973 leaving the reorganized 172nd Infantry Brigade (Separate) as the principal combat formation, split-stationed at both Fort Richardson and Fort Wainwright

The 6th Infantry Division (Light), headquartered at Fort Richardson, was activated in 1986, replacing 172nd Infantry Brigade (Separate). The 6th ID (L) Division headquarters moved to Fort Wainwright in 1990. The 6th 1D (L) maintained an Arctic focus in its unit training and was actively involved in training exercises in Japan and Thailand, at the Joint Readiness Training Center in Arkansas and Louisiana, and throughout Alaska until its inactivation in July 1994. At that time, Army forces in Alaska reorganized under the command of U.S. Army Alaska (USARAK), headquartered at Fort Richardson, with the 172nd Infantry Brigade as the principal combat formation, split-stationed at both Fort Richardson and Fort Wainwright.

== 1993 onwards: USARAK ==
USARAK was headquartered at Joint Base Elmendorf-Richardson and Fort Wainwright, aligned as a major subordinate command of U.S. Army Pacific (USARPAC). USARAK provided trained and ready forces in support of worldwide unified land operations; supports theater engagement in the Pacific/Arctic and military operations in the Alaska Joint Operations Area, in order to contribute to a stable and secure operational environment. The 1st Stryker Brigade Combat Team, 25th Infantry Division was headquartered at Fort Wainwright, near Fairbanks, along with Northern Warfare Training Center (NWTC) and U.S. Army Garrison Alaska. 4th Brigade Combat Team (Airborne), 25th Infantry Division, SFC Christopher R. Brevard Noncommissioned Officer's Academy, and selected units of the 17th Combat Support Sustainment Battalion were stationed at Joint Base Elmendorf-Richardson. Following the commands reflag to the 11th Airborne, all active-duty subordinate units were absorbed into the new division.

=== Structure ===
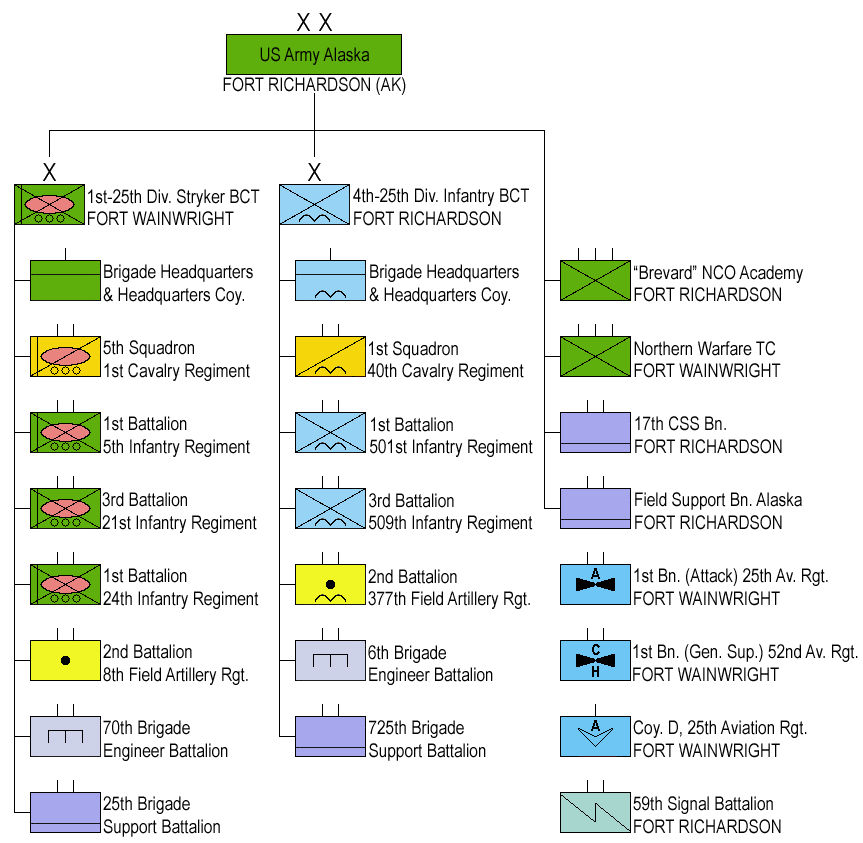
US Army Alaska order of battle

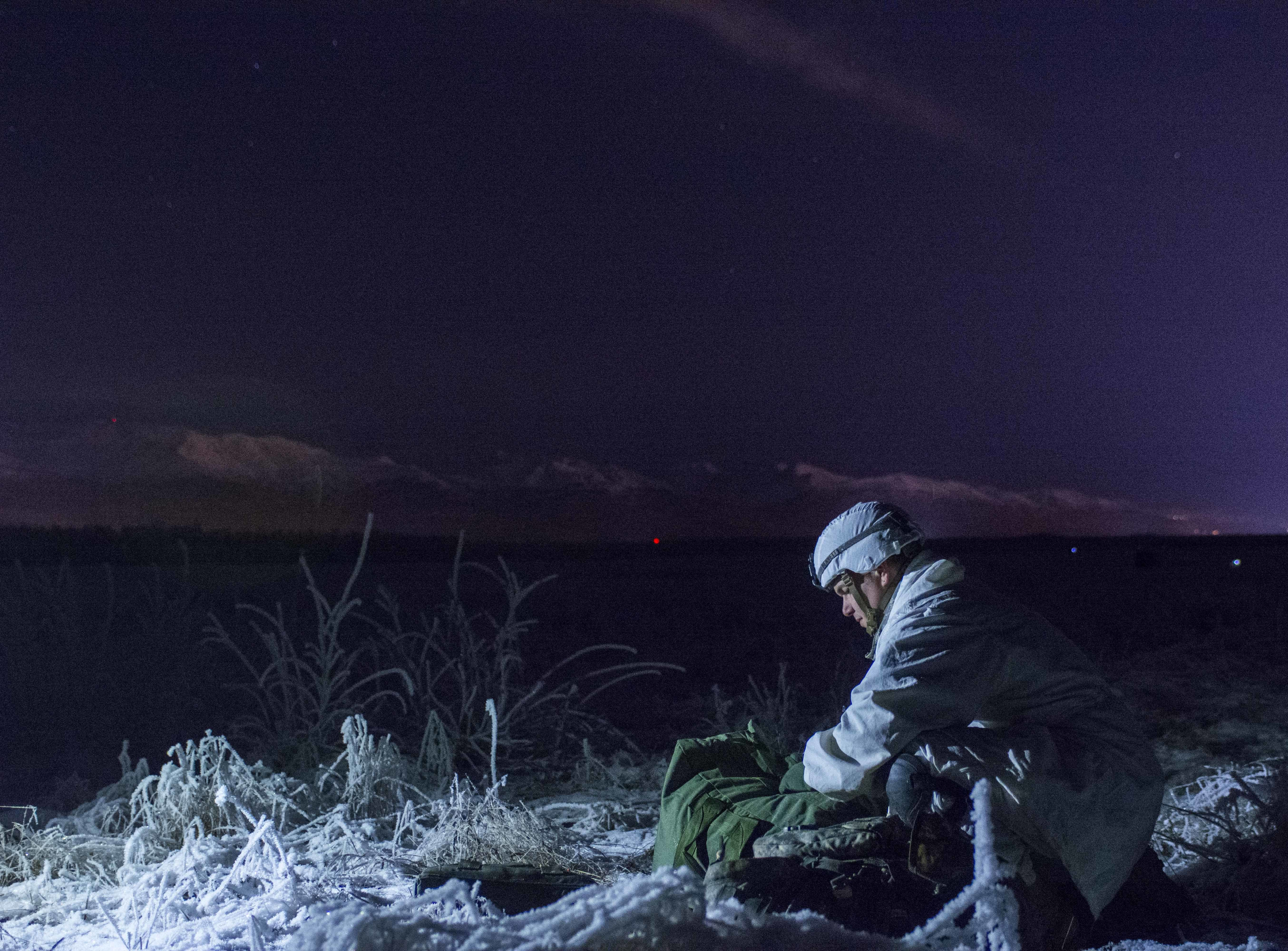
Staff Sgt. Timothy Bennett, a cavalry scout with Blackjack Troop, 1st Squadron, 40th Cavalry Regiment, 4th Infantry Brigade Combat Team (Airborne), 25th Infantry Division, packs his parachute up after a night airborne training jump at Joint Base Elmendorf-Richardson, Alaska, 8 December 2015.

Active component units within United States Army Alaska included:

Units based at Fort Wainwright hosted by US Army Garrison Alaska:

- 1st Brigade Combat Team, 25th Infantry Division, "Arctic Wolves"
  - 5th Squadron, 1st Cavalry Regiment, "Black Hawk"
  - 1st Battalion, 5th Infantry Regiment, "Bobcat"
  - 1st Battalion, 24th Infantry Regiment, "Legion"
  - 3rd Battalion, 21st Infantry Regiment, "Gimlet"
  - 2nd Battalion, 8th Field Artillery Regiment, "Automatic"
  - 70th Brigade Engineer Battalion, "Kodiak"
    - 65th Ordnance Company (EOD)
  - 25th Brigade Support Battalion, "Opahey"
- Arctic Support Command (Provisional)
  - 17th CSSB elements at Fort Wainwright:
    - 539th Transportation Company (Composite)(subordinate to 17th CSSB at JBER)
    - 574th Quartermaster Company (Composite Supply)(subordinate to 17th CSSB at JBER)
    - 626th Quartermaster Company (Field Feeding)(subordinate to 17th CSSB at JBER)
    - 28th MP Detachment (Law Enforcement) (subordinate to 17th CSSB at JBER)
      - 549th MP Detachment (Military Working Dog)
  - Northern Warfare Training Center
- 1st Battalion, 52nd Aviation Regiment (General Support) (subordinate to 16th CAB at JBLM)
- 1st Battalion, 25th Aviation Regiment (Attack Reconnaissance) (subordinate to CAB, 25th ID at Wheeler AAF)
- Company D, 25th Aviation Regiment (Gray Eagle) (subordinate to CAB, 25th ID at Wheeler AAF)
- MEDDAC Alaska

Units based at Joint Base Elmendorf-Richardson (JBER) hosted by the 673rd Air Base Wing:

- HQ, US Army Alaska
- 4th Brigade Combat Team (Airborne), 25th Infantry Division, "Spartans"
  - 1st Squadron, 40th Cavalry Regiment, "Denali"
  - 1st Battalion, 501st Infantry Regiment, "1 Geronimo"
  - 3rd Battalion, 509th Infantry Regiment, "3 Geronimo"
  - 2nd Battalion, 377th Field Artillery Regiment, "Spartan Steel"
  - 6th Brigade Engineer Battalion, "Arctic Sappers"
    - 716th Ordnance Company (EOD)
  - 725th Brigade Support Battalion, "Centurion"
    - 241st Quartermaster Company (Brigade Aerial Delivery)
- Arctic Support Command elements at JBER:
  - 17th Combat Support Sustainment Battalion (subordinate to Arctic Support Command at Fort Wainwright)
    - 4th Quartermaster Company (Theater Aerial Delivery)
    - 109th Transportation Company
    - 205th Ordnance Detachment (Modular)
    - 98th Maintenance Company (Support)
    - 486th Movement Control Team
    - 95th Chemical Company
    - 545th MP Detachment (Law Enforcement)
    - 9th Army Band
  - SFC Brevard NCO Academy
- Army Field Support Battalion - Alaska (subordinate of the 402nd Army Field Support Brigade)
- 59th Signal Battalion / Network Enterprise Center (subordinate unit of the 516th Signal Brigade)
  - Headquarters & Headquarters Detachment
  - 507th Signal Company (Fort Greely)
  - Company C, 307th Signal Battalion (Expeditionary)

Reserve component units located throughout the state included:

- Alaska Army National Guard:
  - Joint Force Headquarters
    - 207th Multi-Function Training Regiment
    - Recruiting and Retention Battalion
    - Medical Detachment
  - 38th Troop Command
    - 1st Battalion, 207th Aviation Regiment (General Support)
    - 1st Battalion, 297th Infantry Regiment
    - 49th Missile Defense Battalion
  - 297th Regional Support Group
    - 297th Military Police Company
    - 208th Construction Management Team
    - 207th Engineer Detachment (Utility)
    - 134th Public Affairs Detachment
    - 49th Personnel Detachment
- United States Army Reserve:
  - 2nd Battalion, 196th Infantry Brigade
  - Company B, 411th Engineer Battalion

== See also ==
- Cold-weather warfare
- List of Nike missile locations - for USARAL missile locations in 1950s
