= 725th Support Battalion (United States) =

725th Support Battalion (Airborne)
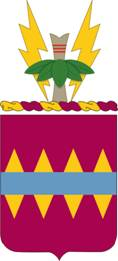
- Coat of arms of the 725th Support Battalion
- Active: 1 October 1941 –
- Country: USA
- Branch: U.S. Army
- Type: Brigade Support battalion
- Garrison/HQ: Fort Richardson, Alaska
- Nickname: Centurions
- Motto: Service to the Line
- Engagements: World War II; Korean War; Vietnam; Iraq War; Afghanistan

Commanders
- Current commander: LTC Jessica McCarthy
- Notable commanders: LTC Claude "Chris" Christianson (LTG - Retired)

Insignia
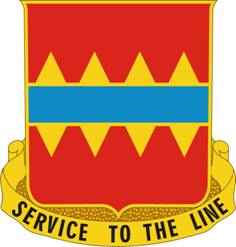
- Distinctive Unit Insignia

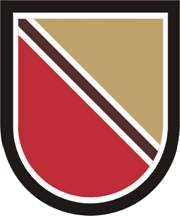
- Unit beret flash

The 725th Brigade Support Battalion (BSB) (Airborne) is a support battalion assigned to the 2nd Infantry Brigade Combat Team (Airborne), 11th Airborne Division located in Alaska, which is one of two brigade combat teams assigned to 11th Airborne Division. The unit provides support for the infantry, artillery and cavalry units assigned to the brigade. The 725th consists of eight support companies. The 725th used to be known as the 167th Support Battalion. The unit's motto is "Service to the Line".

== History ==
The 725th BSB (Airborne) was constituted at Schofield Barracks, Hawai'i on 26 August 1941 as the Maintenance Platoon, Headquarters Company, 325th Quartermaster Battalion using the personnel and equipment of the 11th Ordnance Company, Hawaiian Division; and activated on 1 October 1941. On 1 August 1942 it was reorganized and redesignated as the Ordnance Maintenance Platoon. On 1 November 1942 the platoon was reorganized and redesignated as the 725th Ordnance Light Maintenance Company, a separate company of the 25th Division. The primary mission of the company was vehicle repair. The company accompanied the 25th Division to Guadalcanal where it supported the division's units during that campaign and subsequent campaigns in the North Solomon Islands and on Luzon. For its service in the liberation of the Philippines the company was awarded the Philippine Presidential Unit Citation.

On 20 March 1946 the company was reorganized and redesignated as the 725th Ordnance Maintenance Company to reflect additional ordnance maintenance capabilities. During the Korean War the 725th participated in all ten campaigns with the 25th Division receiving a Meritorious Unit Commendation and two Republic of Korea Presidential Unit Citations. During the late stages of the war on 1 February 1953 the 725th was reorganized and redesignated as the 725th Ordnance Battalion to meet the increased requirements for ordnance maintenance support throughout the division.

In the reorganization of the 25th Division in 1963 the battalion was reorganized and redesignated as the 725th Maintenance Battalion to perform maintenance support on a wide variety of divisional equipment. The first unit of the 725th to arrive in Vietnam was Company D which accompanied the 3rd Brigade to the Central Highlands in December 1965. The rest of the battalion arrived on 1 April 1966 and was based at Củ Chi. During combat operations a mobile direct support company of the battalion would accompany each brigade providing maintenance and repair parts supply to the line units. The 725th Maintenance Battalion served in twelve Vietnam campaigns receiving two Meritorious Unit Commendations, two awards of the Republic of Vietnam Cross of Gallantry with Palm and the Vietnam Civil Actions Medal. Additionally, Company B received a Valorous Unit Award and a Meritorious Unit Commendation; Company C received two Valorous Unit Awards (Jan–Apr 66, DAGO 20, 67; 11–31 Aug 69, DAGO 43, 72) and a Meritorious Unit Commendation (1 Oct 69–31 Mar 70, DAGO 51, 71) and Company D received a Valorous Unit Award and a Meritorious Unit Commendation.

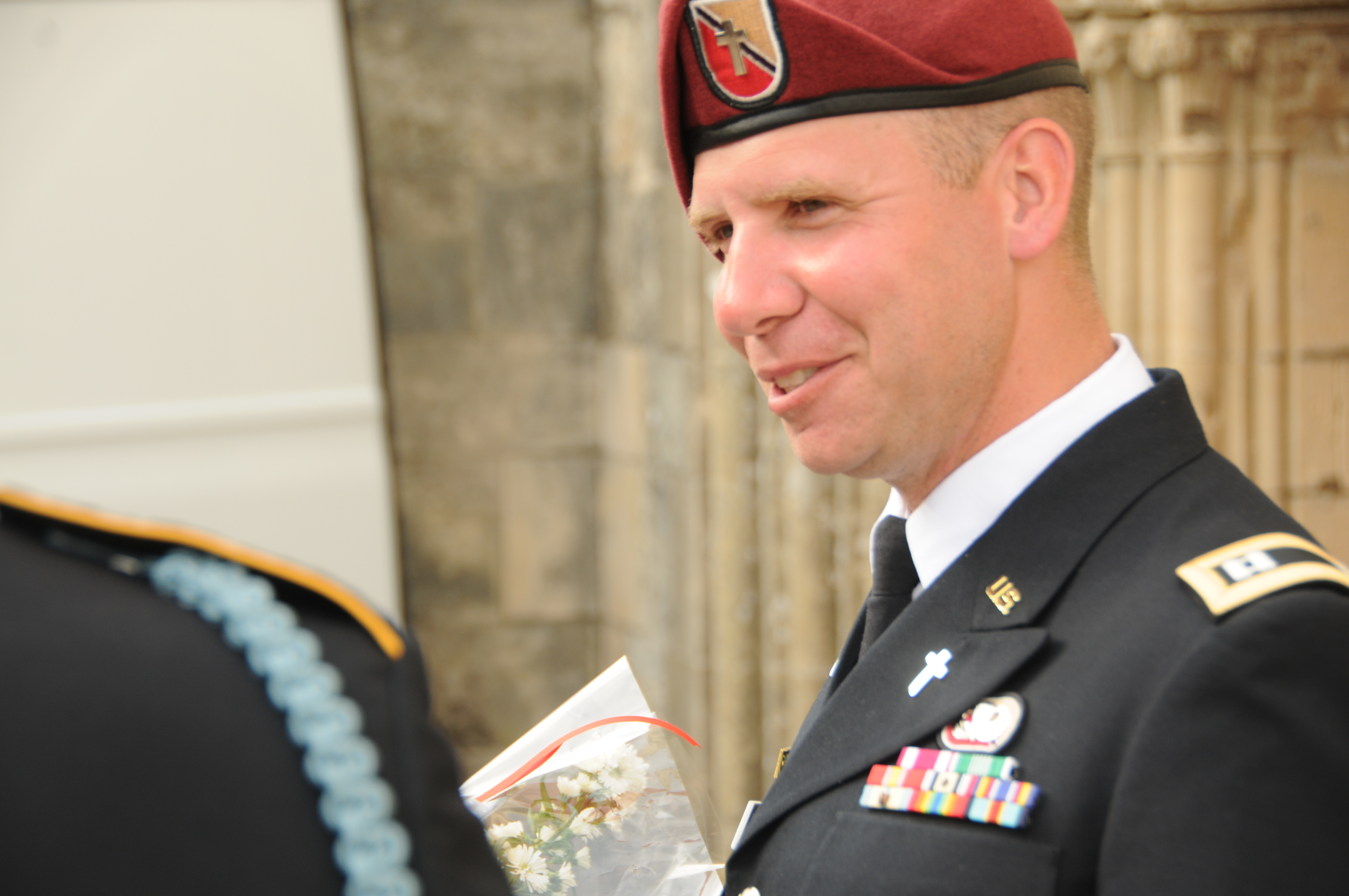
Captain Jon Butler assigned to the 725th Brigade Support Battalion on 6 June 2014

On 16 April 1992 the battalion was redesignated as the 725th Support Battalion and was reorganized as a main support battalion consisting of a headquarters and supply company, a motor transport company, an ordnance maintenance company and a medical company. Elements of the battalion supported the 2nd Brigade Combat Team in Iraq from January 2004 – February 2005 as part of Logistics Task Force 225. The remainder of the Battalion served in Afghanistan from February 2004 – 2005 and was based at Bagram Air Base. The battalion was organized as Logistics Task Force 725 and included four non-25th Division combat service support units. LTF 725 provided full-spectrum combat service support to 18 Forward Operating Bases in Regional Command East including maintenance and medical support.

On 16 November 2005 the battalion was temporarily inactivated. On 16 September 2006 the 725th was reorganized and redesignated as the 725th Support Battalion (Airborne) and assigned to the 4th Brigade Combat Team {Airborne), 25th Infantry Division with home station at Fort Richardson, Alaska. The brigade was reflagged as the 2nd Infantry Brigade Combat Team (Airborne), 11th Airborne Division in June 2022 where it continues to serve today.

== Decorations ==
- Meritorious Unit Commendation (Army), Streamer embroidered KOREA 1950-1951
- Meritorious Unit Commendation (Army), Streamer embroidered VIETNAM 1966
- Meritorious Unit Commendation (Army), Streamer embroidered VIETNAM 1969
- Meritorious Unit Commendation (Army), Streamer embroidered IRAQ 2006-2007
- Meritorious Unit Commendation (Army), Streamer embroidered AFGHANISTAN 2009-2010
- Meritorious Unit Commendation (Army), Streamer embroidered AFGHANISTAN 2011-2012
- Philippine Presidential Unit Citation, Streamer embroidered 17 OCTOBER 1944 TO 4 JULY 1945
- Republic of Korea Presidential Unit Citation, Streamer embroidered MASAN-CHINJU
- Republic of Korea Presidential Unit Citation, Streamer embroidered MUNSAN-NI
- Republic of Vietnam Cross of Gallantry with Palm, Streamer embroidered VIETNAM 1966-1968
- Republic of Vietnam Cross of Gallantry with Palm, Streamer embroidered VIETNAM 1968-1970
- Republic of Vietnam Civil Action Honor Medal, First Class, Streamer embroidered VIETNAM 1966-1970
