= Fort Wainwright =

United States Army post in Fairbanks, Alaska

- Fairbanks, Alaska near North Pole, Alaska (Yukon Training Area) near Delta Junction, Alaska (Donnelly, Black Rapids, Whistler & Gerstle Training Areas)
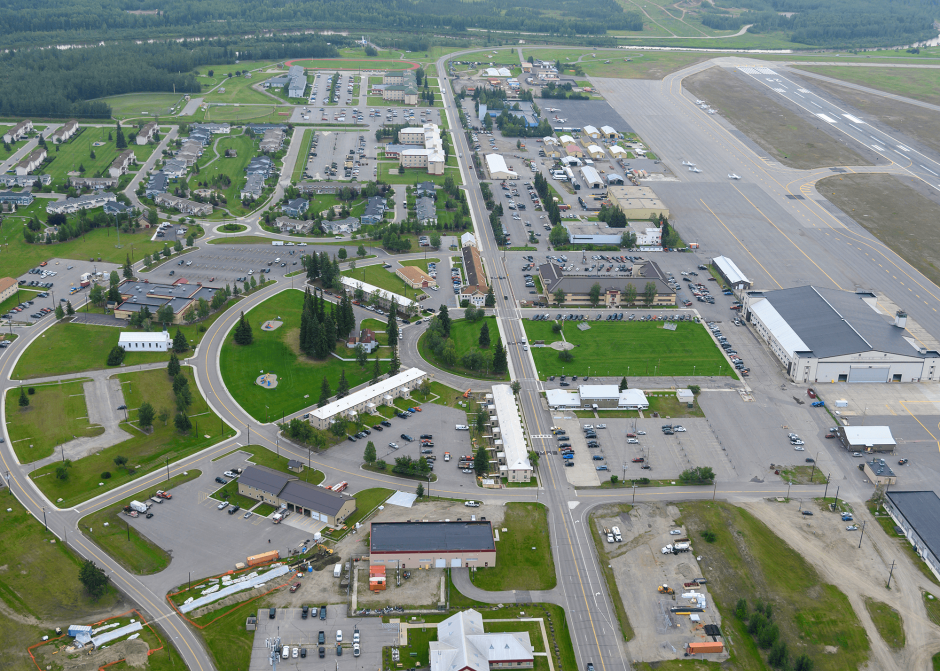
- Aerial view of main post

Site information
- Type: Army post
- Controlled by: United States Army

Site history
- Built: 1941 (as Ladd Field)
- In use: 1941–present

Garrison information
- Current commander: COL Jason A. Cole
- Garrison: 1st Infantry Brigade Combat Team, 11th Airborne Division; United States Army Garrison Alaska
- Military installation
- Location within Alaska Location within North America
- Coordinates: 64°49′40″N 147°38′34″W
- Country: United States
- State: Alaska
- Borough: Fairbanks North Star Borough

Area
  - Total: 2,500 sq mi (6,475 km^{2})

Population
  - Total: ~15,000
- Time zone: UTC−8 (Alaskan (AST))
  - Summer (DST): UTC−9 (AKST)
- ZIP Code: 99703
- Area codes: 907

Fort Wainwright is a United States Army installation in Fairbanks, Alaska. Fort Wainwright is part of the Fairbanks North Star Borough and the coterminous Fairbanks Metropolitan Statistical Area. The installation is managed by U.S. Army Garrison Alaska (USAG Alaska) and the senior command is 11th Airborne Division. Fort Wainwright was formerly known as Ladd Field (1939–1945) and Ladd Air Force Base (1947–1961); it was renamed Fort Wainwright in honor of General Jonathan M. Wainwright, a Medal of Honor recipient for his courageous leadership as commander of U.S. forces during the fall of the Philippines in World War II. Ladd Field was designated as a National Historic Landmark (NHL) on 4 February 1985 and Ladd Air Force Base was designated as Ladd Air Force Base Cold War District and was added to the National Register of Historic Places (NRHP) on the same day. With over 1.6 million acres of land spanning across the Fairbanks North Star Borough and Southeast Fairbanks, Fort Wainwright is the largest U.S. military installation by area outside the contiguous United States.

== Geography ==
=== Location ===
Fort Wainwright is located in Interior Alaska, between the Alaska Range in the south and the Brooks Range in the north. Fort Wainwright's boundaries are located within the Fairbanks North Star Borough. To the west is the City of Fairbanks, and to the southeast is the City of North Pole. Fort Wainwright resides on both sides of the Chena River, a 100-mile tributary of the Tanana River.

=== Demographics ===
The total population to include the workforce on Fort Wainwright is approximately 15,000 personnel. There are roughly 6,500 military members, 5,700 military dependents, 1,250 civilian employees including appropriated and non-appropriated fund employees and over 400 contractors.

=== Climate ===
Fort Wainwright is located in a subarctic climate with seasonal temperature extremes. Temperature extremes have been recorded from −66 °F to +94 °F (−54 °C to +34 °C). The average low temperature is in January at −17 °F (−27 °C) with the average high temperature is during July at +73 °F (+22 °C). The annual precipitation averages 12 inches (305 mm) of rain and 37 inches (94 cm) of snow. Fort Wainwright is approximately 190 miles south of the Arctic Circle. The hours where the sun is above the horizon averages 22 hours in June with twilight during the night hours and less than 4 hours in December. The climate creates a short construction season for installation projects. It also potentially contributes to Seasonal Affective Disorder (SAD) among the workforce.

=== Geology ===
Fairbanks falls in a region with discontinuous permafrost, a condition where permafrost is broken by pockets of unfrozen ground. This, coupled with the periglacial effect of seasonal freezing and thawing, can drastically modify the ground surface. Construction engineering in this environment requires additional planning to avoid the potential for hazards of ground movement or collapse.

== Cultural resources ==
=== Historic and archeological sites ===
Fort Wainwright has a Cultural Resources Management Program that is responsible for over 1.6 million acres of Army-managed land with a diverse array of resources including historical buildings, a national historic landmark, archeological sites, and properties of traditional religious and cultural significance. There are over 650 prehistoric archeological sites on Fort Wainwright and its training lands that date from the last ice age (14,000 years ago) to the Alaskan homesteading era. USAG Alaska have several agreements in place in regards to historical findings and archaeological digs. Partnerships include the State of Alaska Historical Preservation office and the University of Alaska Fairbanks’ Museum of the North who curates the archeological relics.

=== Native Liaison ===
The U.S. Army Garrison Alaska (USAG Alaska) provides an Alaska Native Liaison that manages the Native Liaison/Government to Government program for Fort Wainwright. Fort Wainwright's cantonment and training areas is made up of Army-withdrawn land that support resources that have been utilized by the Alaska Native community for thousands of years. U.S. Army Alaska (USARAK) and USAG Alaska support the policy of tribal self-determination through support for Army's government-to-government relationship with tribes and implementing the Army American Indian and Alaska Native Policy, Department of Defense (DoD) American Indian and Alaska Native Policy, the policy’s Alaska Implementation Guidance, and DoD Instruction 4710.02: Interactions with Federally-Recognized Tribes.

== Major tenants and supported units ==
11th Airborne Division ''Arctic Angels''

- HHC Reception Group
- 1st Infantry Brigade Combat Team, 11th Airborne Division “Arctic Wolves”
  - 1st Battalion, 5th Infantry Regiment “Bobcats”
  - 1st Battalion, 24th Infantry Regiment “Blockhouse”
  - 5th Squadron, 1st Cavalry Regiment “Black Hawks”
  - 2d Battalion, 8th Field Artillery Regiment “Automatic 8th”
  - 25th Brigade Support Battalion “Opahey”
- 65th Explosive Ordnance Disposal Company “Dreadnought” (Higher HQ is in Hawaii)
- 1st Battalion, 52d Aviation Regiment, 16th Aviation Brigade
- 1st Battalion, 25th Aviation Regiment, 25th Aviation Brigade
- 17th Combat Sustainment Support Battalion
- 402d Army Field Support Battalion – Logistic Readiness Center
- Northern Warfare Training Center

U.S. Army Garrison Alaska - Installation Management Command
Medical Department Activity - Alaska (Bassett Army Hospital/Veterans Center)
Dental Activity - Alaska
Veterinary Command
412th Contracting Command
U.S. Army Reserve Center

== History ==
In the 1930s Alaska was a vast undefended region where Alaska's territorial delegates to congress lobbied to obtain a better defense strategy. Then-Lt. Col. Henry "Hap" Arnold led a flight of B-10 bombers from Washington D.C. to Alaska in 1934 scouting for potential airfields. His report recommended the establishment of an air base at Fairbanks which could support cold weather testing and serve as a tactical supply depot.

In 1935, Congress passed the Wilcox National Air Defense Act which authorized the construction of new airbases including one in Alaska for cold weather testing and training. March 1937, President Franklin Roosevelt withdrew public land for the Army in Executive Order 7596 as the location for the airfield and the base. Congress approved appropriated funds in 1939 for the construction of Ladd Field, named after Maj. Arthur Ladd, an Army Air Corps pilot who perished in an airplane crash in South Carolina while under sealed orders.

=== World War II ===
==== Cold-weather test station ====
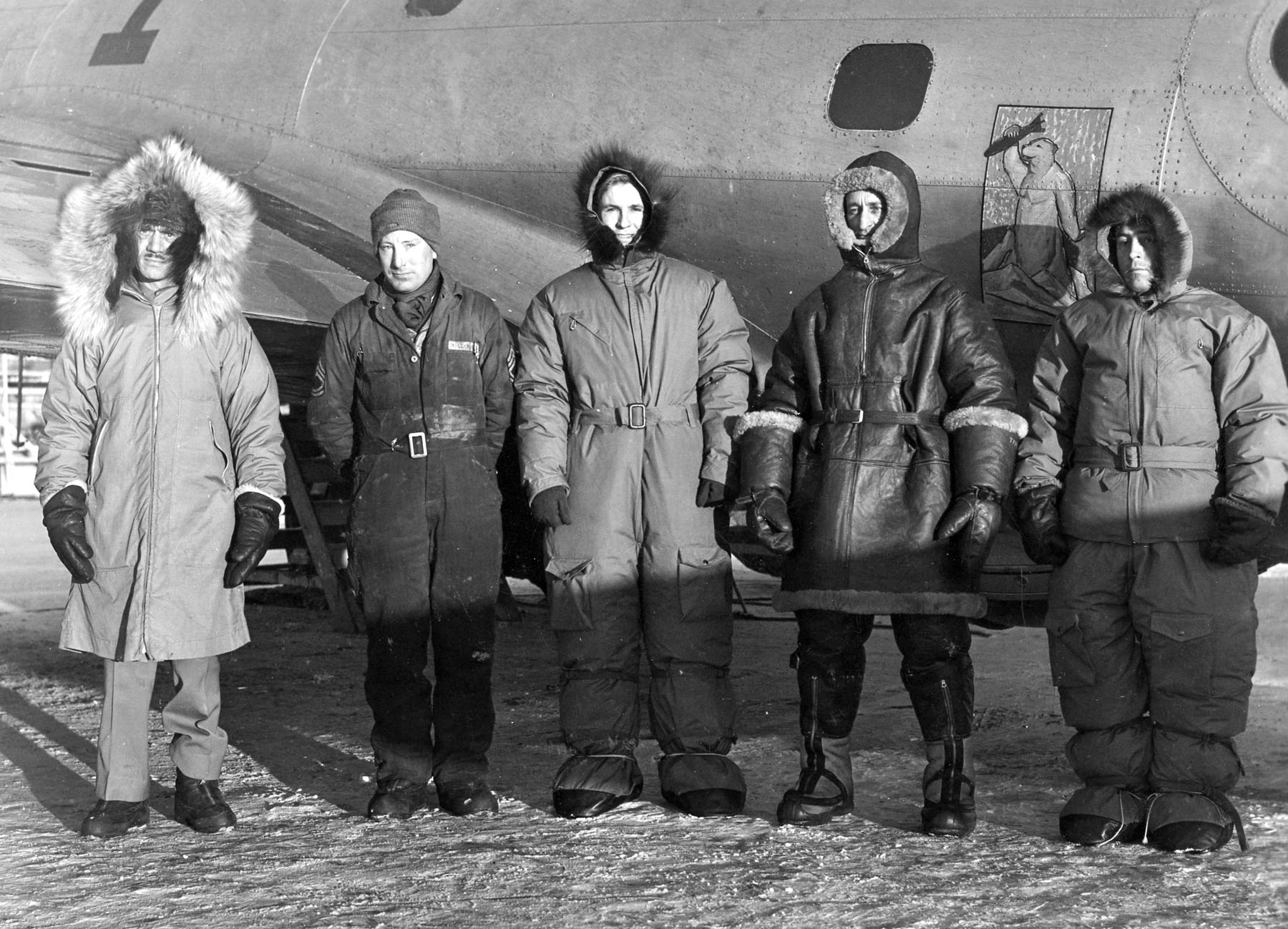
Cold weather test of flight clothes Ladd Field, 1941

The construction of Ladd Field began in earnest early in 1940, prompted by the declaration of war in Europe months before. During its first two years of operations, Ladd Field's mission was as a cold-weather test station. The station commander of the Cold Weather Test Station was Maj. Dale V. Gaffney. The cold weather station focused primarily on testing aircraft performance and maintenance. Its major goal was to develop standard procedures for servicing and operating aircraft in subzero temperatures and to test various airplane parts and fluids. The testing program looked at other aspects of arctic operations to include clothing, communication, equipment, survival gear, medical issues, and ground support.

During 1940–1942, Ladd Field was devoted to research and considered an "exempt station" from combat. In June 1942, Japan bombed Dutch Harbor, on the Aleutian Island of Unalaska, and occupied the islands of Attu and Kiska. The Cold Weather Test Station was deactivated and Ladd Field came temporarily under control of the 11th Air Force who fell under the Alaska Defense Command. By fall of 1942, the Cold Weather test Station was reactivated and became an exempted research station again.

==== Lend-Lease program ====
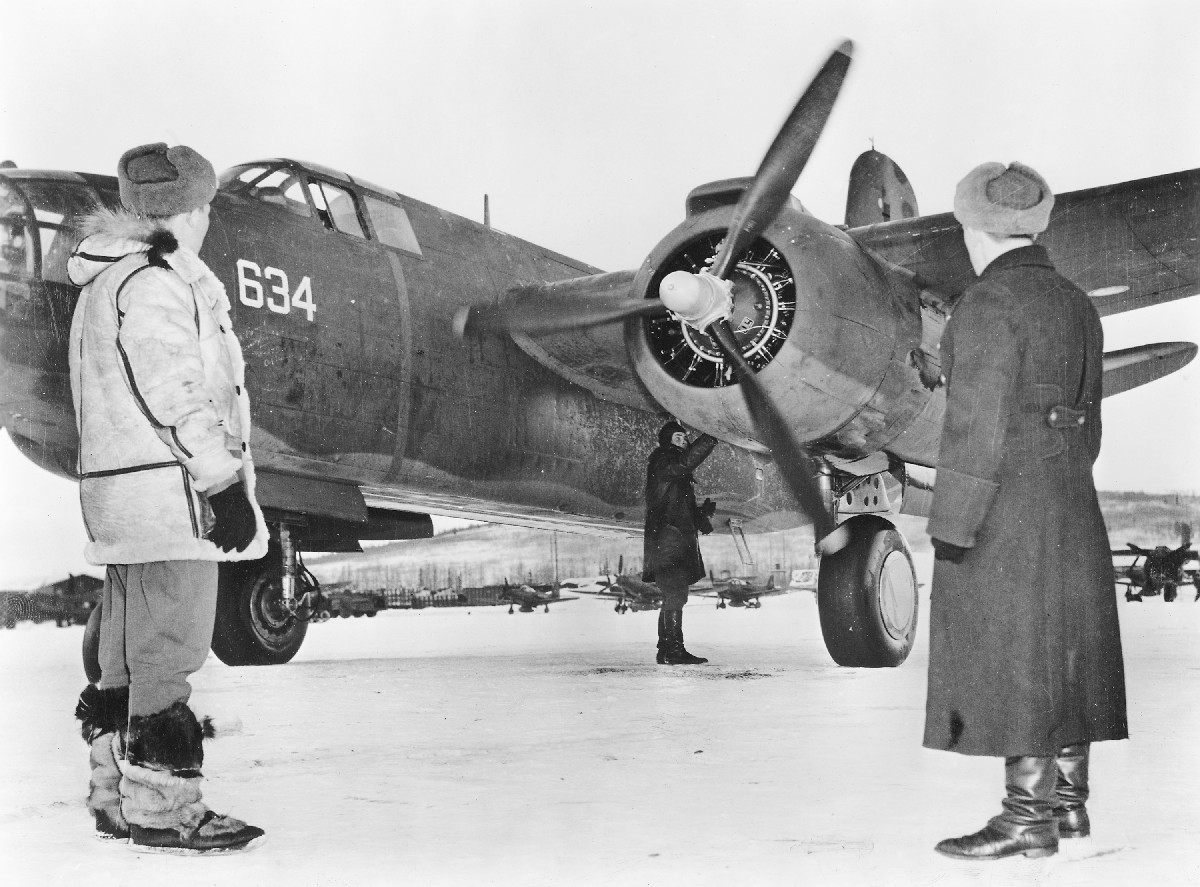
Lend-Lease program final check, 1942

In 1942, under Lend-Lease agreements, the United States provided war planes and materials to the Soviet Union to use against Nazi Germany. Ladd Field was selected as the transfer point for Lend-Lease aircraft transiting the Alaska-Siberia (ALSIB) route. More than 7,900 aircraft were eventually delivered to Soviet pilots waiting at Ladd field who would then fly them to Nome and across Siberia to the eastern war front. To facilitate this mission, Ladd Field was transferred to the Air Transport Command (ATC) for the remainder of the war.

Under the ATC, Ladd field expanded with a new hangar and runway along with hundreds of temporary building to house the large workforce needed to support the mission. By June 1945 Ladd Field was capable of billeting 4,555 troops. Cold weather testing continued its mission as a tenant unit on Ladd. The conclusion of WWII marked the end of the Lend-Lease Program in September 1945. Military personnel left Alaska and Ladd Field was transferred from ATC back to 11th Air Force.

==== Women's Army Corps (WAC) ====
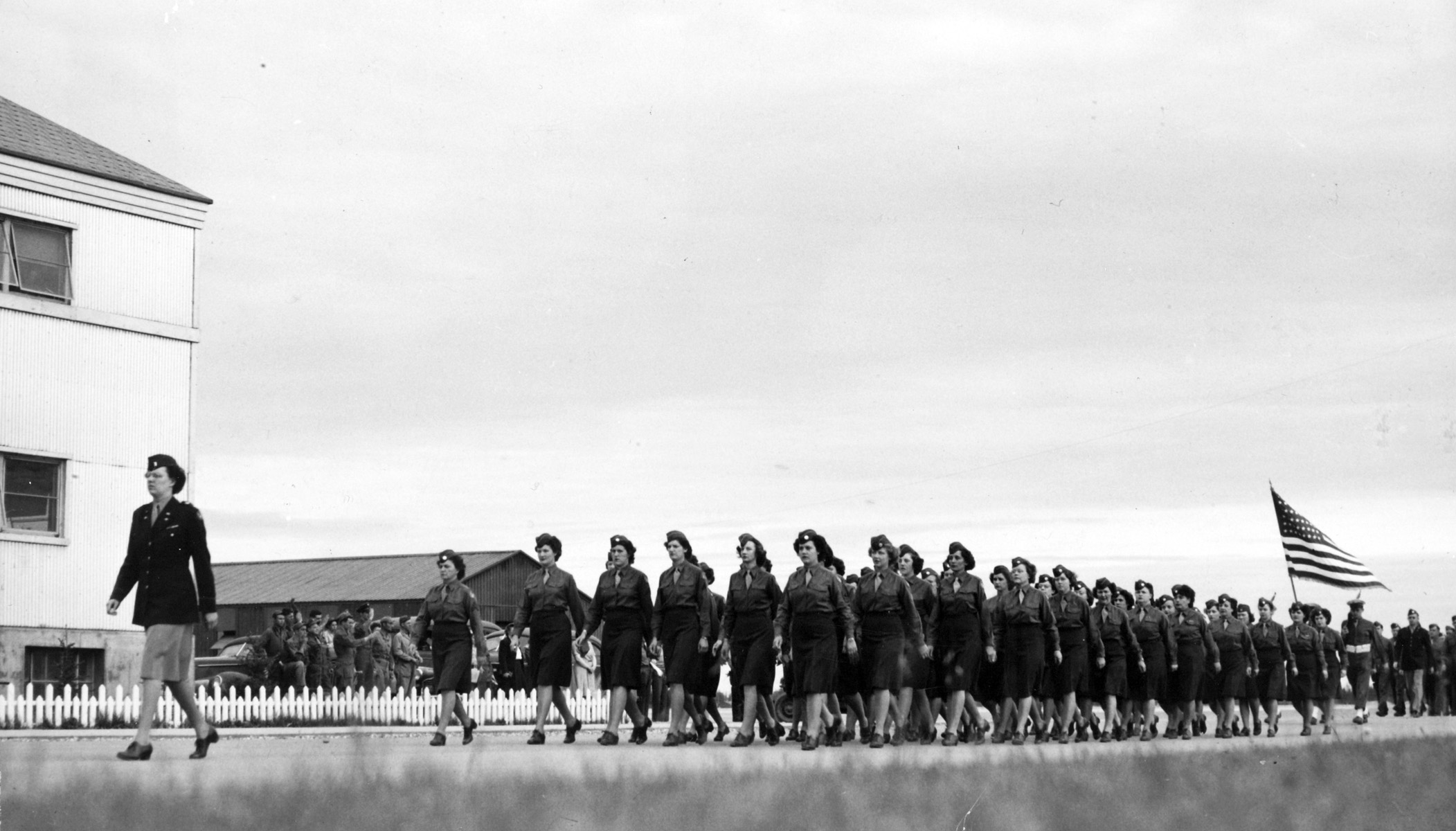
WAC Review Ladd Field, 1945

1st Lt. Woodall was the first WAC to be stationed at Ladd Field, arriving in January 1945 to work as an aerial photographer with the Cold Weather Test Detachment. At Ladd Field, her duties included establishing the Extreme Temperature Operations Unit (ETOU) laboratory that tested photographic equipment on military aircraft. This required her to cross the Arctic Circle in a B-29 at high altitude making her the first armed forces female to fly to the arctic. The 1466th AAF Base Unit Squadron W arrived at Ladd Field in April. Maj. Betty Etten Wiker, then a 1st Lieutenant (1st Lt.) served as the WAC commanding officer at Ladd Field. The WAC served in various positions, from office work to performing field duty as medics and airplane mechanics. One tenth of the Ladd Field WACs were assigned duties within Army Airways Communication System (AACS). The WAC departed from Ladd Field in December 1945 after the end of the Lend-Lease Program.

==== Cold War ====
In 1945, rivalry developed between the United States and the Soviet Union resulting in the Cold War. The proximity of the Soviet Union to Alaska in a post-war long-range bomber age spurred the development of the Arctic front. The Arctic would encompass many activities for the Department of Defense to include use as a forward deployment zone and as a first line of defense in the region. In 1947, due to the National Securities Act, the Air Force was designated as a separate branch from the Army. Ladd Field was renamed Ladd Air Force Base commanded by the 11th Air Force. During this time Eielson airfield was established to supplement Ladd AFB with a separate B-36 bomber mission.

In the early years of the Cold War, Ladd AFB's missions included; assessing the Soviet presence in the Arctic by strategic reconnaissance; supplying a regional air defense asset; improvement of the practice of polar navigation; and continued cold weather testing of equipment, clothing and human performance. In 1948, the Army sent the 2nd Infantry Division to Ladd AFB with a mission of ground defense.

During the Korean War in 1950 and through to 1957 Ladd AFB saw a rise in tempo and an increase in their logistics operations. The base became the logistical support center for Alaska's defense projects. Research expanded creating an ice station research center to analysis and track polar ice packs; perform geophysics projects and expand communication networks. The 4th Infantry Regiment provided the combat mission man power through 1956.

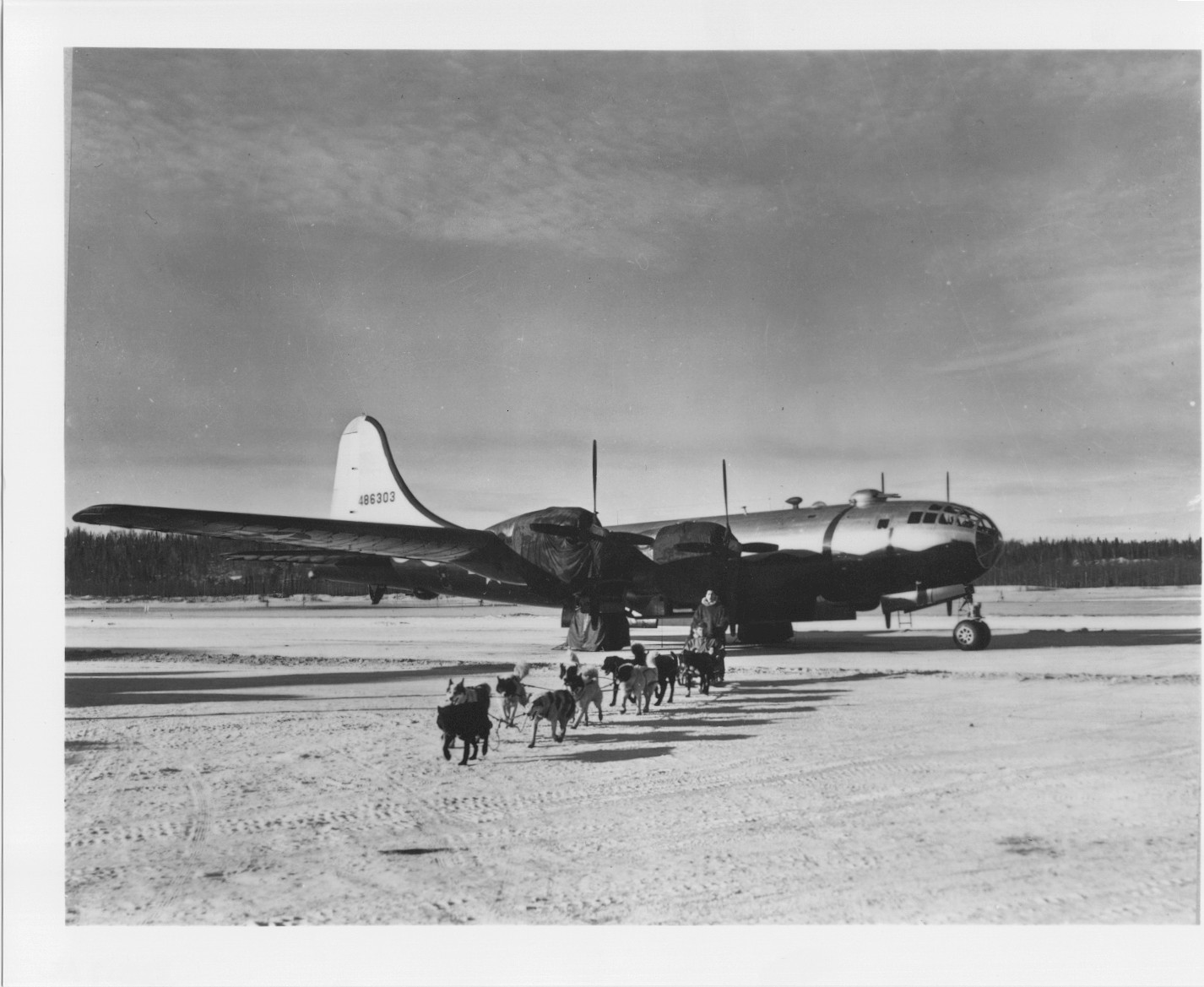
B-29 with dog team at Ladd AFB (USAF)

By 1957, intercontinental ballistic missiles (ICBMs) and satellites reduced the role for Ladd AFB. In 1960, with two major airbases in close proximity, coupled with economic pressures, the Air Force stopped flying operations at Ladd and reassigned them to Eielson AFB and to Elmendorf AFB in Anchorage. The Air Force transferred Ladd to the Army on 1 January 1961, and the installation was renamed Fort Wainwright after WWII General, Jonathan M. Wainwright.

In 1963, the 171st Infantry Brigade (mechanized) was activated at Fort Wainwright to defend Eielson AFB. Several elements of the 171st IN (Mech) deployed to Vietnam in 1966. In 1969, the 171st Infantry transitioned from mechanized to light infantry and were subsequently inactivated in 1972 from Fort Wainwright. Ladd Field was designated as a National Historic Landmark (NHL) on 4 February 1985. Ladd Air Force Base was designated as Ladd Air Force Base Cold War District and was added to the National Register of Historic Places (NRHP) on the same day. In 1986, Fort Wainwright expanded their mission beyond the Arctic to support world-wide deployments. USARAL was discontinued in 1974. This left the 172nd Infantry Brigade at Fort Richardson to assume control of the Army in Alaska, reporting directly to FORSCOM at Fort McPherson, Georgia. In 1986, the 6th Infantry Division (light) was assigned to Fort Richardson and assumed the role of overall Army Command in Alaska from the 172nd Infantry Brigade. The 6th ID provided a rapid-deployment worldwide strike force and participated in worldwide training events.

=== Post–Cold War ===
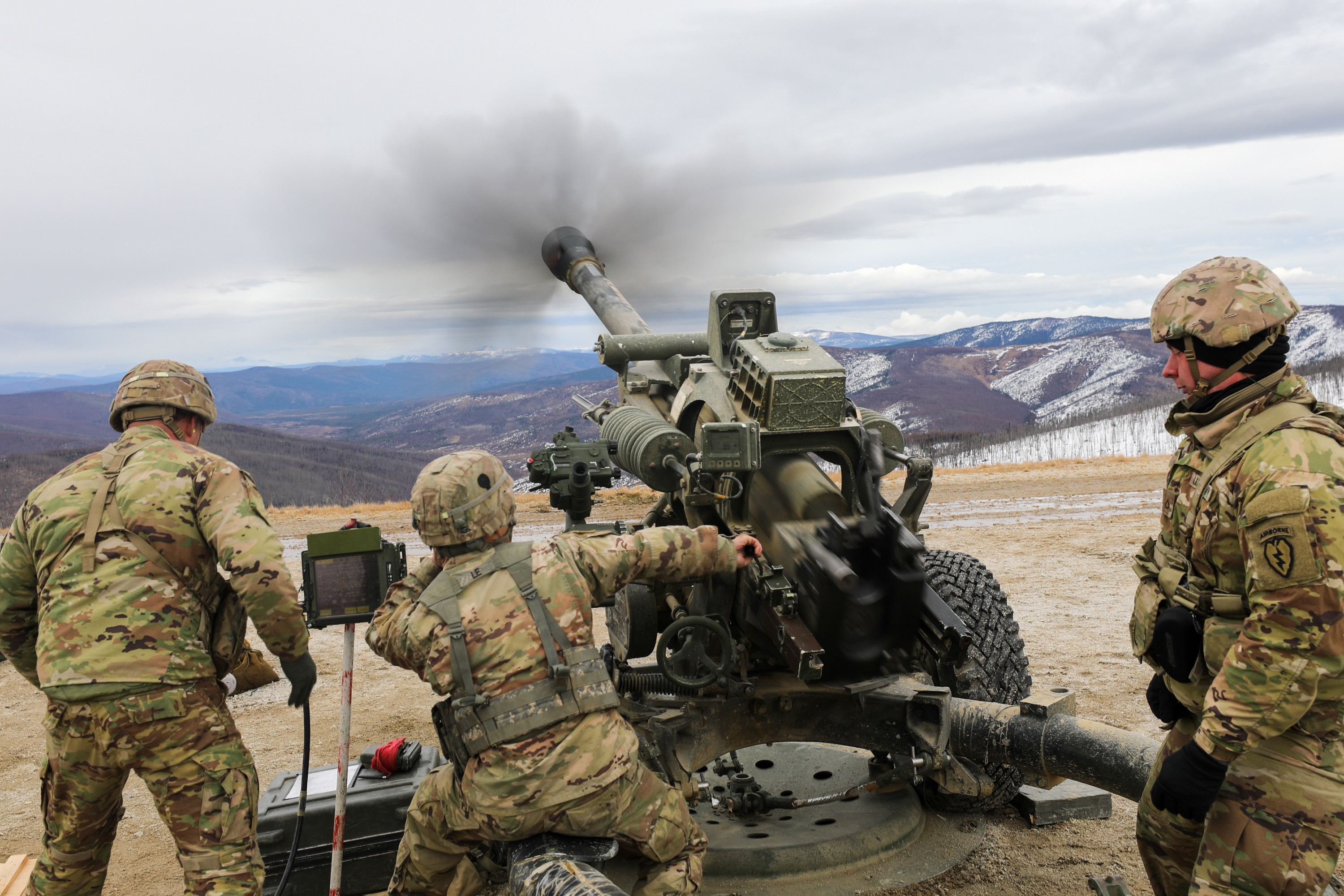
Soldiers train on the M119 howitzer in Yukon Training Area in 2021.

In 1994, U.S. Army Alaska (USARAK) was activated and replaced the 6th Infantry Division, reestablishing the Alaskan Command. The 2004 Army Modernization Plan, created to facilitate deployments to Afghanistan and Iraq, created modular brigade combat teams. This configuration transformed the 172nd Infantry Brigade at Fort Richardson into the 1st Stryker Brigade Combat Team (SBCT), 25th Infantry Division (1/25 SBCT) stationed at Fort Wainwright becoming its dominant warfighting unit. The newly transformed 4/25 BCT (Airborne) remained at Fort Richardson. The mission of the 1-25 SBCT (no "/" is used for this unit) was to deploy rapidly 'to a designated contingency area of operation by air and [conduct] operations either as a separate Brigade Combat Team or under the control of a contingency force headquarters." Equipped with wheeled Stryker armored vehicles, the brigade filled the gap between light forces like the 4/25 BCT (Airborne) and heavy, armored units. In June 2022, U.S. Army Alaska reflagged to the 11th Airborne Division subsequently making the former 1-25 and 4-25 1st Infantry Brigade and 2nd Infantry Brigade of the 11th Airborne Division, respectively.

==== Training and recreation areas ====
Fort Wainwright manages over 1.6 million acres of training and recreation land. Training areas include Tanana Flats, Yukon, Donnelly, Black Rapids and Gerstle River. Seasonally, these areas can be used by the military and the public for recreation activities by obtaining a Recreation Access Permit. The U.S. Army Recreation Tracking Systems (USARTRAK) has been established to facilitate public access on Fort Wainwright training lands and allows recreational users to check in by phone or online. The USARTRAK website has updated training area map information depicting impact areas and off limit areas. It also shows when and where certain training areas will be temporarily restricted during training exercises.

Fort Wainwright manages specialized outdoor recreation areas in the cantonment area to include Chena Bend Clubhouse and Golf Course, Birch Hill Ski and snowboard Area, Fischer Skeet range and two RV and tent campgrounds. Fort Wainwright also manages the Seward Military Resort located on the Kenai Peninsula.

== Quality-of-life issues ==
In 2019, a behavioral health epidemiological consultation, or EPICON, was requested after Alaskan Congressman Don Young sent a letter to the Surgeon General of the U.S. Army and Commanding General, U.S. Army Medical Command requesting a team of medical professionals to be sent to Fort Wainwright to examine the situation on the ground in relation to a number of reported suicides. Observed findings were consistent with suicide cases in previous EPICONs. Soldiers who died by suicide had indications of multiple risk factors, including chronic pain, relationship issues, and trouble sleeping.

Concurrently, in 2019, the Army initiated a pilot program to target quality-of-life improvements at Fort Irwin, California; Fort Polk, Louisiana; and Fort Wainwright, Alaska. General Gus Perna, Commander for the Army Materiel Command (AMC), emphasized that increasing quality of life across the force remains a top priority for Army senior leaders.

General Perna stated that "Quite frankly, Fort Wainwright is in an austere environment, ...Fort Irwin and Fort Polk are also austere, but it is where we do all of our [brigade combat team] training. We send our best leaders at all levels that go train our BCTs ... to places that don't have a lot of quality of life."

On Fort Wainwright, USARAK and USAG Alaska implemented a number of Quality of Life initiatives that included blackout curtains barracks to boost the ability to sleep during the 24-hours of sunlight in the summer, planning the construction of winter maintenance facilities to improve workplace quality during extreme cold weather and generous leave policies for soldiers allowing for more time with family in an attempt to reduce an isolation effect in an austere environment.

By 2022, the Army and Defense Health Agency began hiring behavioral health providers as well as family life counselors to support the installation's soldiers and reduce wait times. This included temporary positions until full-time providers were made available all as part of the Army's recently established Mission 100 program. Additionally, resources were made available to new families to include loaner furniture, increased funding and expanded routes for the post shuttle, and increasing access to Alaskan ski facilities. The year prior, Option 20 became available to new Army recruits to enable them to choose Alaska as a duty station, allowing for more region-specific volunteers to be stationed there.

== Environmental issues ==
=== Site contamination ===
Since 1978, Fort Wainwright has been participating in the Department of Defense Installation Restoration Program to investigate and clean up contamination. In 1985 and 1986, lead and chromium were detected in monitoring wells at the landfill. In 1987, chromium and tetrahydrofuran were detected in monitoring wells at the proposed housing area, and chromium was detected in soil. About 15,000 people live and work at the fort and obtain drinking water from wells in close proximity to contaminated source areas. The Chena River also runs through the contaminated area of Fort Wainwright.

==== National priorities listing ====
In August 1990 Fort Wainwright was registered on the national priorities list as a Superfund. In most source areas, groundwater is contaminated with solvents and petroleum products, in a few source areas, with pesticides and/or fuel additives. Soil contains some solvents, waste oil, waste fuel/petroleum products, pesticides, paint residues, fuel tank sludge and polycyclic aromatic hydrocarbons (PAHs). Sediments contain PAHs and low level pesticides. Contaminants on the site also include mercury.

==== Taku Gardens ====
To meet the needs of new personnel and their families, construction of 128 homes on a 54-acre housing project known as Taku Gardens began in 2005 on the former communications site. In June, 2005 construction workers noticed "stained soil and unusual odors during excavation of a building foundation" and laboratory testing revealed the presence of PCB at concentrations of up to 115,000 mg/kg - Alaska's current clean-up standard is 1 mg/kg. Further testing of the site revealed the presence of volatile and semi-volatile organic compounds, chlorinated compounds including solvents, herbicides, pesticides, dioxins, and "munitions-related compounds" such as nitroaromatics and propellants. Construction was suspended August–September 2005 and continued until end of 2006. A January, 2007 Army audit questioned "the wisdom of building a family housing complex on top of a known 1950s-era military landfill" and concluded that "the situation with the Taku construction project is the direct result of multiple individuals failing to adhere to Army and federal regulations and guidance. From 2007 to 2010 drums and debris were excavated, PCB contaminated soil was removed and backfilled, but some fuel and volatile organic compound-contaminated soil and groundwater remains on site.

Construction of the housing project resumed during the summer of 2011. In the intervening years, many housing units between Taku Gardens and the main gate were reconstructed or renovated, with new housing built as well. Immediately northeast of Taku Gardens, Bear Paw was built on a part of the former site of Bassett Army Hospital, while construction of new homes began on the rest of the site in 2011. Immediately northeast of Bear Paw, Denali Village, a much larger development, was constructed between Glass Park and the former billeting. Taku Gardens area, the newer housing across from Bassett Hospital was renamed to Tanana Trails in 2015.

==== Hangar 6 ====
In June, 2006, civilian construction workers at Aircraft Maintenance Hangar No. 6 – known by the Corps of Engineers to be a designated Hazardous Waste Accumulation point – were overcome by fumes described as "pungent, chalky and metallic tasting" and suffered nausea, headaches and other symptoms. A state health report concluded that "an unknown, volatile chemical likely caused nerve damage to the disabled workers." More than 30 workers were hospitalized and at least 4 have suffered lasting disabilities. The workers initiated a civil suit against the Army which was dismissed because the workers were limited to state workers’ compensation as their only relief.

==== Underground storage fuel tanks ====
EPA inspections found that from at least 2012 to 2013, Fort Wainwright failed to monitor underground storage tanks regularly, perform leak detection tests, and investigate suspected releases. The Army paid a penalty of nearly $158,700.

== Education ==
The school district for dependents living on-post is the Fairbanks North Star Borough School District (FNSBSD). Residents on-post, for the elementary level level, are zoned to any of these: Arctic Light Elementary School, Hunter Elementary School, and Ladd Elementary School K-8 school. For middle school, residents may choose between Tanana Middle School or Ladd Elementary's grade 7-8 program. The zoned high school is Lathrop High School.

Previously Ticasuk Brown Elementary School took students from Fort Wainwright.

== Additional reading ==
- Their War, Too: The Women's Army Corps and Ladd Field. Fort Wainwright Directorate of Public Works Cultural Resource Management Office.
- U.S. Army Garrison Fort Wainwright: Guide to the Ladd Field National Historic Landmark and Ladd Air Force Base Cold War Historic District. Fort Wainwright Directorate of Public Works Cultural Resource Management Office.
- Price, Kathy (January 2001). Northern Defenders: Cold War Context of Ladd Air Force Base Fairbanks, Alaska 1947-1961. Center for Ecological Management of Military Lands, Colorado State University.
- Price, Kathy (May 2004). The World War II Heritage of Ladd Field, Fairbanks, Alaska. Center for Ecological Management of Military Lands, Colorado State University.
- Lend-Lease Operations 1942-1945. Fort Wainwright Directorate of Public Works Cultural Resource Management Office.
- "National Historic Preservation Act Section 106 Consultation". Fort Wainwright Directorate of Public Works Cultural Resource Management Office. Archived from the original on April 4, 2022.
- "Ladd Air Force Base Cold War Historic District (Cold War, 1947-1961)". Archived from the original on April 4, 2022.
- "USAG Alaska, Fort Wainwright Archaeology, Cultural Resources". Archived from the original on April 4, 2022.
- "Quick Facts: Fairbanks North Star Borough, Alaska, United States Census Bureau".
- Thomas, Natalie K. "Honoring Fort Wainwright's Heritage".
- Siedler, William J (August 2012). The Coldest Front: Cold War Military Properties in Alaska Revised and Expanded, U.S. department of Defense: Legacy Resource management Program.
- Tewksbury, Sara. "To reduce suicides Fairbanks Army Base must improve quality of life, public health survey says". Webcenter Channel 11, Fairbanks.
- Suits, Devon L. "Army pilot program focuses on quality of life at three 'austere' posts".
- Tewksbury, Sara. "Following feedback from soldiers, Fort Wainwright implements quality of life improvements". Webcenter Channel 11, Fairbanks.
- ""Military Installations USAG Alaska, Wainwright"". Military OneSource. U.S. Department of Defense.
- ""NPL Site Narrative for Fort Wainwright"". US EPA. 30 August 1990.
- ""FORT WAINWRIGHT"". US EPA. February 2007.
- ""Fort Wainwright, Taku Gardens (102 Communications Site)"". State of Alaska Department for Environmental Conservation. June 2009.
- ""Army knew Alaska base family housing site was toxic"". PEER. July 7, 2008.
- ". "Taku Housing Construction Project Audit"". Office of the Staff Judge Advocate, US Army Alaska. January 2007.
- ""Chemical caused nerve damage to military base workers"". No. January 20, 2011. PEER.
- Burke, Jill (January 20, 2011). ""Unearthed toxin at Fort Wainwright likely injured workers"". Alaska Dispatch.
- ""Fort Wainwright Reduces Water Contamination Risk from Fuel Tanks in EPA Settlement"". US EPA. 2 July 2014.
- ""Fort Wainwright, 172nd Infantry Brigade, Land Withdrawal: Environmental Impact Statement"". US EPA. 1981.
