= Operation Marne Avalanche =

US Military Operation

- Part of Iraq War
Date	16 July 2007 – 15 August 2007
Location	southern Baghdad, Iraq
Result	Transitioned to Operation Marne Husky at the commencement of Operation Phantom Strike

Belligerents
United States; Iraq	Iraqi insurgency

Strength
Unknown	Unknown

Casualties and losses
None	83 killed 278 captured 51 weapon caches found 51 boats destroyed
- 872 killed

Operation Marne Avalanche was a US military operation that occurred in southern Baghdad in July 2007 as part of Operation Phantom Thunder. The goal of the offensive operation was to stop southern Baghdad from being used as a haven and to prevent the movement of weapons, munitions and insurgent activity into Baghdad.

== Operation details ==
The operation's intent was to improve security conditions in southern Baghdad and reduce the influence of insurgents in the area. Another goal of the operation was to stanche the flow of weapons into Baghdad.

Marne Avalanche built on the successes of Task Force Marne's offensive operation, Marne Torch, which began 16 June 2007. Operation Marne Torch resulted in more than 1,152 structures cleared, 83 suspected insurgents killed, 278 suspected insurgents detained, 51 weapons caches found, 51 boats destroyed and 872 Iraqi citizens entered in a biometric identification system.
