= Fort Richardson (Alaska) =

United States Army installation in Alaska

- Anchorage, Alaska
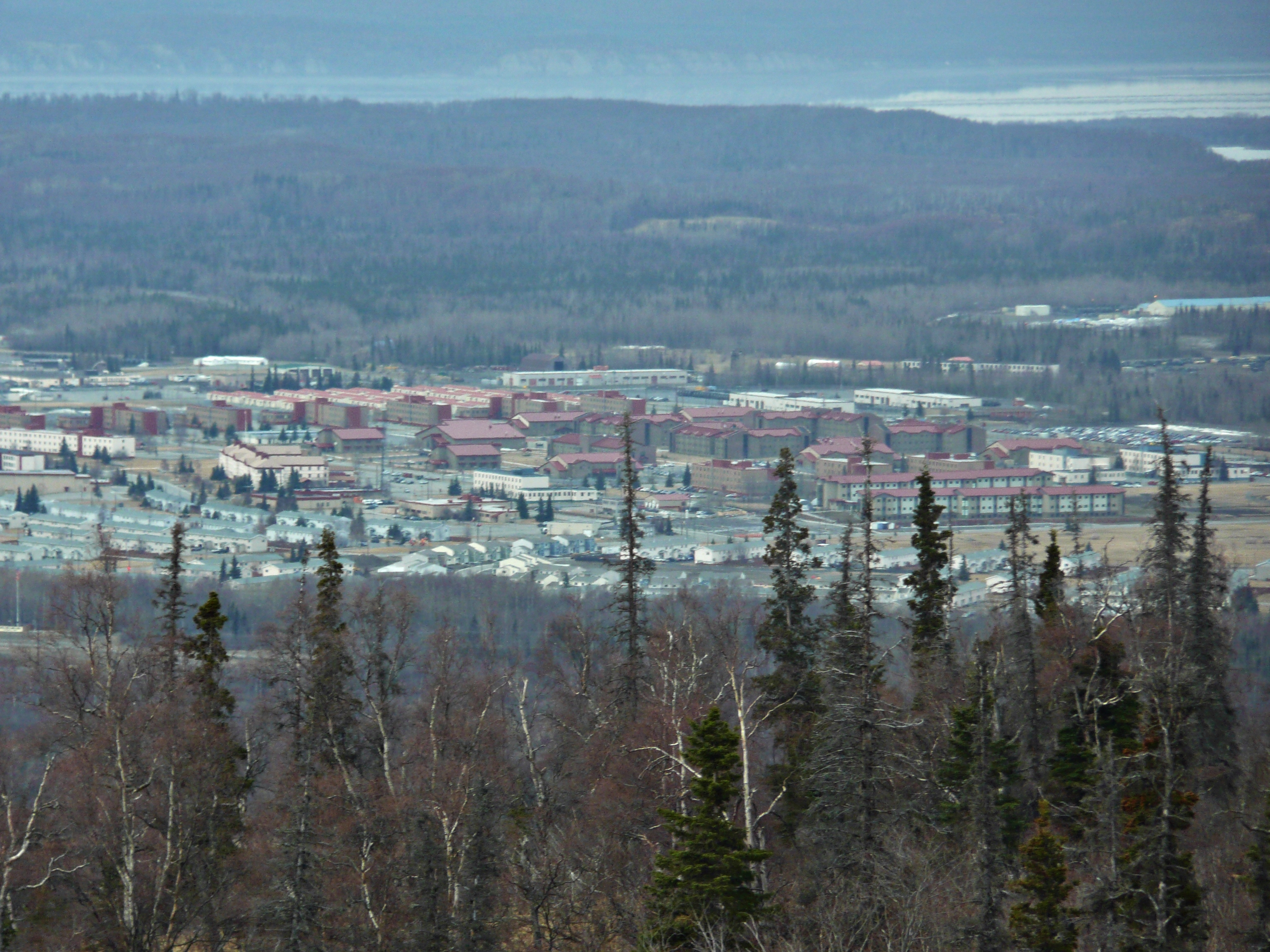
- The main part of the post as viewed from Arctic Valley in the Chugach Mountains in 2009

Site information
- Type: Army post

Location
- Coordinates: 61.2541°N 149.6952°W

Site history
- Built: 1940–1941
- In use: 1941–present

Garrison information
- Garrison: HQ 11th Airborne Division; 2nd IBCT(A), 11th Airborne Division

Fort Richardson is a United States Army installation in the U.S. State of Alaska, adjacent to the city of Anchorage. In 2010, it was merged with nearby Elmendorf Air Force Base to form Joint Base Elmendorf-Richardson.

== History ==
Fort Richardson was named for the military pioneer explorer, Brig. Gen. Wilds P. Richardson, who served three tours of duty in the rugged Alaska territory between 1897 and 1917. Richardson, a native Texan and an 1884 West Point graduate, commanded troops along the Yukon River and supervised construction of Fort Egbert near Eagle, and Fort William H. Seward (Chilkoot Barracks) near Haines. As head of the War Department's Alaska Road Commission from 1905 to 1917, he was responsible for much of the surveying and building of early railroads, roads and bridges that helped the state's settlement and growth. The Valdez-Fairbanks Trail, surveyed under his direction in 1904, was named the Richardson Highway in his honor.

During World War II, Fort Richardson was used briefly as a holding center for several family members of Alaskan Japanese Americans arrested after Pearl Harbor. Fifteen Japanese Americans and two German Americans were interned here before being transferred to other camps. Built during 1940–1941 on the site of what is now Elmendorf Air Force Base and established as the headquarters of the United States Army, Alaska (USARAK) in 1947, the post moved to its present location 5 miles (8.0 km) northeast of Anchorage in 1950. The post then had barracks for 500 soldiers, a rifle range, a few warehouses, a hospital, and bachelor officer quarters. From 1986 to 1994 the fort was headquarters of the 6th Infantry Division (Light). Fort Richardson was formerly headquarters for United States Army Alaska (USARAK), a subordinate unit of United States Army Pacific Command. For more than a decade, the major combat unit at Fort Richardson was Task Force 1–501, the only airborne infantry battalion in the Pacific Theater. Task Force 1-501 deployed to Afghanistan from October 2003 through August 2004.

The majority of USARAK combat forces were at Fort Wainwright, 300 miles (480 km) to the north, with Fort Richardson as the primary support base. However, the standing of the 4th Infantry Brigade Combat Team 25th Infantry Division in 2005 made the unit serve as the primary strategic response force in the Pacific Theater and turning Fort Richardson into a post for this new combat force as well.

== Demographics ==
Historical population
Census	Pop.	Note	%±
1970	10,751		—
U.S. Decennial Census

Fort Richardson appeared once on the 1970 U.S. Census as an unincorporated military reservation. Because it was located within the confines of the Anchorage Census Division, it was consolidated into the City of Anchorage in 1975.

== Recent history ==
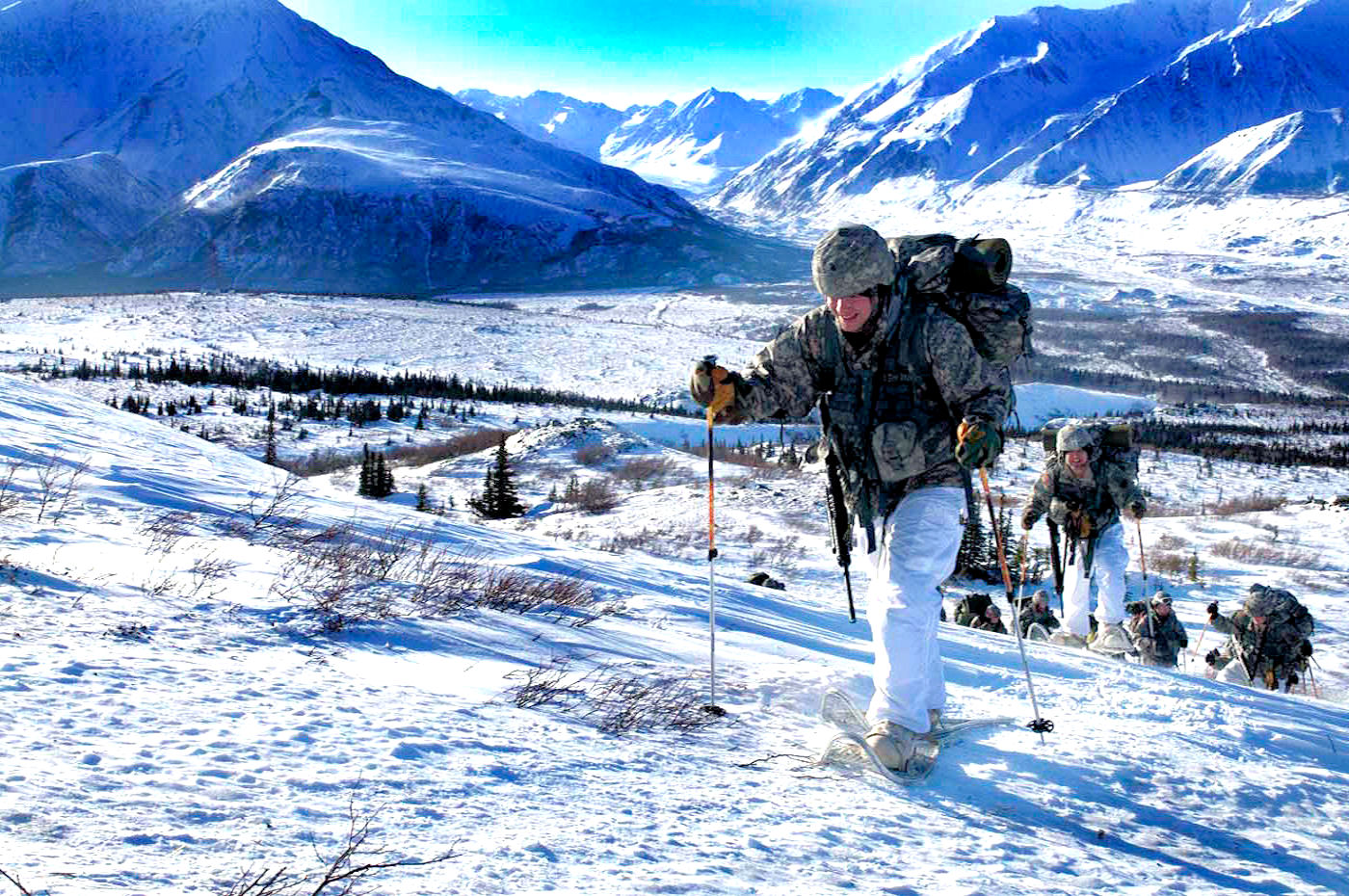
Fort Richardson snowshoeing

During the Army's expansion following the September 11, 2001 attacks, Task Force 1-501 was expanded into an airborne brigade. Flagged as 4th Brigade Combat Team (Airborne), 25th Infantry Division, the unit is now the primary strategic response force for the Pacific Theater. It comprises two infantry battalions, an engineer battalion, one cavalry squadron, a small artillery battalion, and a support battalion. A full range of family and soldier support facilities common to any small Army community are found on post, ranging from a shoppette to childcare and recreational facilities. The post has small but modern dental and medical clinics, and receives major medical services from the 3rd Medical Group hospital at Elmendorf. The Joint Military Mall, also located on Elmendorf, provides post exchange and commissary services.

The post's largest military tenant is the Alaska National Guard, with facilities at Camp Carroll and Camp Denali. Fort Richardson also hosts several non-military activities, including a United States National Cemetery and a state-owned fish hatchery. According to the Fort's website, there are 5,418 soldiers, as well as over 8,300 family members housed at the base as of June 2008. The Fort also employs about 1,200 Army and DOD civilian employees. Fort Richardson's military payroll for fiscal year 2003 was $85 million. The civilian payroll was $49 million. Including other expenditures of $111 million, Fort Richardson put more than $245 million into the local economy.

The fort encompasses 73,014 acres, which includes space for offices, family housing, a heliport, a drop zone suitable for airborne and air/land operations, firing ranges and other training areas. Nearby mountain ranges offer soldiers the opportunity to learn mountain/glacier warfare and rescue techniques.

By June 2022, Fort Richardson's anchor tenant, USARAK, was redesignated as 11th Airborne Division and subsequently the 1st Stryker Brigade and 4th Infantry Brigade to 1st Infantry Brigade and 2nd Infantry Brigade (Airborne), respectively.

=== Facilities ===
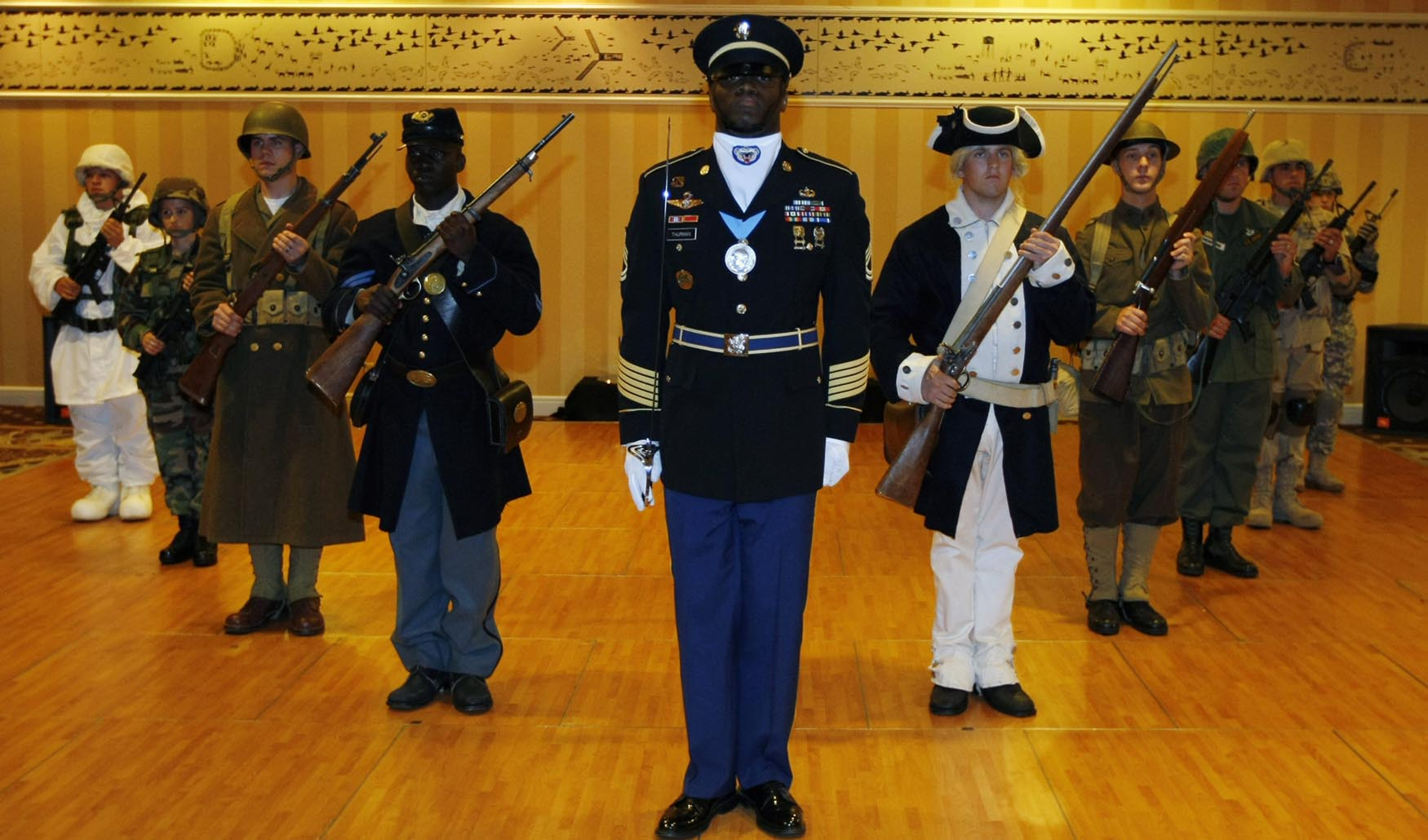
Alaska soldiers celebrate Army's 234th birthday

The post's largest military tenant is the Alaska National Guard, with facilities at Camp Carroll and Camp Denali. Fort Richardson also hosts several non-military activities, including a United States National Cemetery and a state-owned fish hatchery.

The fort encompasses 73,014 acres (29,548 ha), which includes space for offices, family housing, a heliport, a drop zone suitable for airborne and air/land operations, firing ranges and other training areas. Nearby mountain ranges offer soldiers the opportunity to learn mountain/glacier warfare and rescue techniques.

The Buckner Fieldhouse is a 3,500 seat multi-purpose arena on Fort Richardson. From 1978 to 1982, it was home to the Great Alaska Shootout basketball tournament. It was replaced as the Shootout venue when the Sullivan Arena opened in 1983. Along with the West Anchorage High School gymnasium and the former Anchorage Sports Arena on Fireweed Lane, the Buckner Fieldhouse served as a venue for various other events which later moved to the Sullivan Arena and the William A. Egan Civic and Convention Center upon those facilities' completion.

=== Unification with Elmendorf AFB ===
Under the base unification procedure, which began finalization in the summer of 2010, Elmendorf AFB and Fort Richardson were consolidated as a result of decisions made by the 2005 Base Realignment and Closure Commission (BRAC). The combined base is known as Joint Base Elmendorf-Richardson. Most of the current civilian base employees became Air Force employees as a result.
