= Operation Marne Torch =

Battle operation in the Iraq-USA war

- Part of the Iraq War (Operation Phantom Thunder)
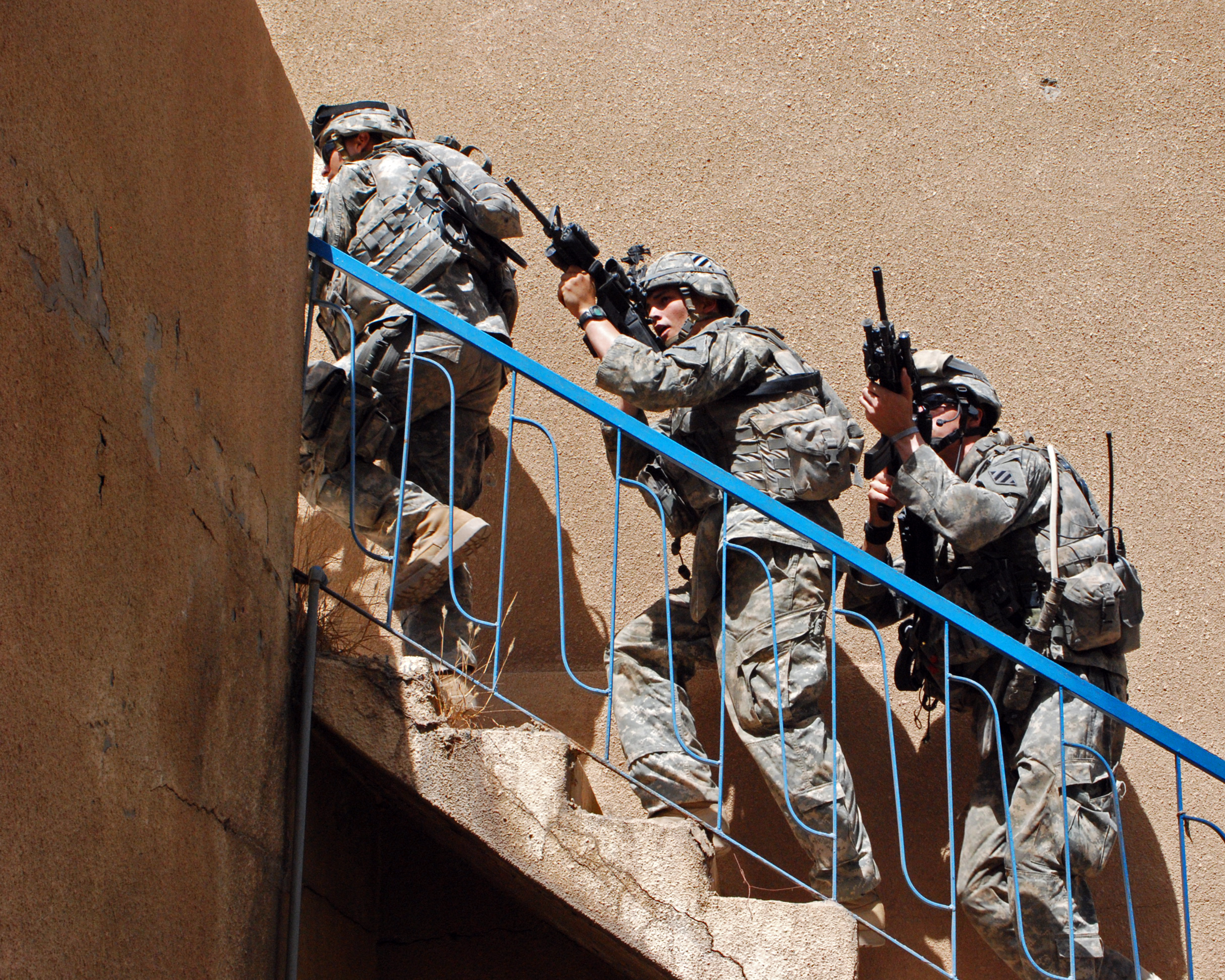
- Soldiers from 1-30 Infantry, 2nd BCT, 3rd ID clear a house in Arab Jabour Soldiers from 1-30 Infantry, 2nd Brigade Combat Team, 3rd Infantry Division, storm one of the thousands of structures that was cleared during Operation Marne Torch.
Date	16 June 2007 – 14 August 2007 (Marne Torch 1); 15 September 2007 – 14 October 2007 (Marne Torch II)
Location	Babil Province, Iraq
Result	U.S. military raids successful; Disruption of insurgent supply lines; Holding operations delayed

Belligerents
United States; New Iraqi Army	Islamic State of Iraq; Other Iraqi insurgents

Commanders and leaders
(United States) General Rick Lynch (Task Force Marne) (United States) Colonel Terry Ferrell (2-3BCT) (United States) Colonel Wayne W. Grigsby Jr. (3-3HBCT)	

Strength
3000 (2000 Coalition, 1000 Iraqi)	Unknown

Casualties and losses
13 killed (U.S.), 3 killed (Iraqi security forces), 1 OH-58 Kiowa shot down	83 killed, 278 detained

Operation Marne Torch refers to two operations launched by U.S.-led Coalition forces in 2007 against Islamic State of Iraq in the Arab Jabour area of Babil province. This campaign is named after Operation Torch, the joint US/British invasion of French North Africa in 1942, presumably because of the two operations' similar thrust into the enemies' southern underbellies.

The first operation, Marne Torch I, began on 16 June 2007 when Multinational Division Central launched offensive operations against Sunni and Shi'ia extremists, as well as insurgents with Iranian influence in the city and surrounding regions of Arab Jabour in Babil province. The objective was to clear terrorist sanctuaries southeast of Baghdad and reduce the flow of accelerants into the city by both combat and civil-military operations. 2000 coalition and 1000 Iraqi army soldiers disrupted insurgent operations by capturing, seizing, and clearing caches that support instability in the area.

Marne Torch II was launched on 15 September 2007 in the Hawr Rajab area. The operation resulted in the killing or capture of 250 insurgents, the destruction of twelve boats transporting weapons, and uncovering 40 weapon caches.

== Background ==
In mid-October 2006, al-Qaeda announced the creation of the Islamic State of Iraq (ISI), replacing the Mujahideen Shura Council (MSC) and its al-Qaeda in Iraq (AQI).

== Marne Torch I ==
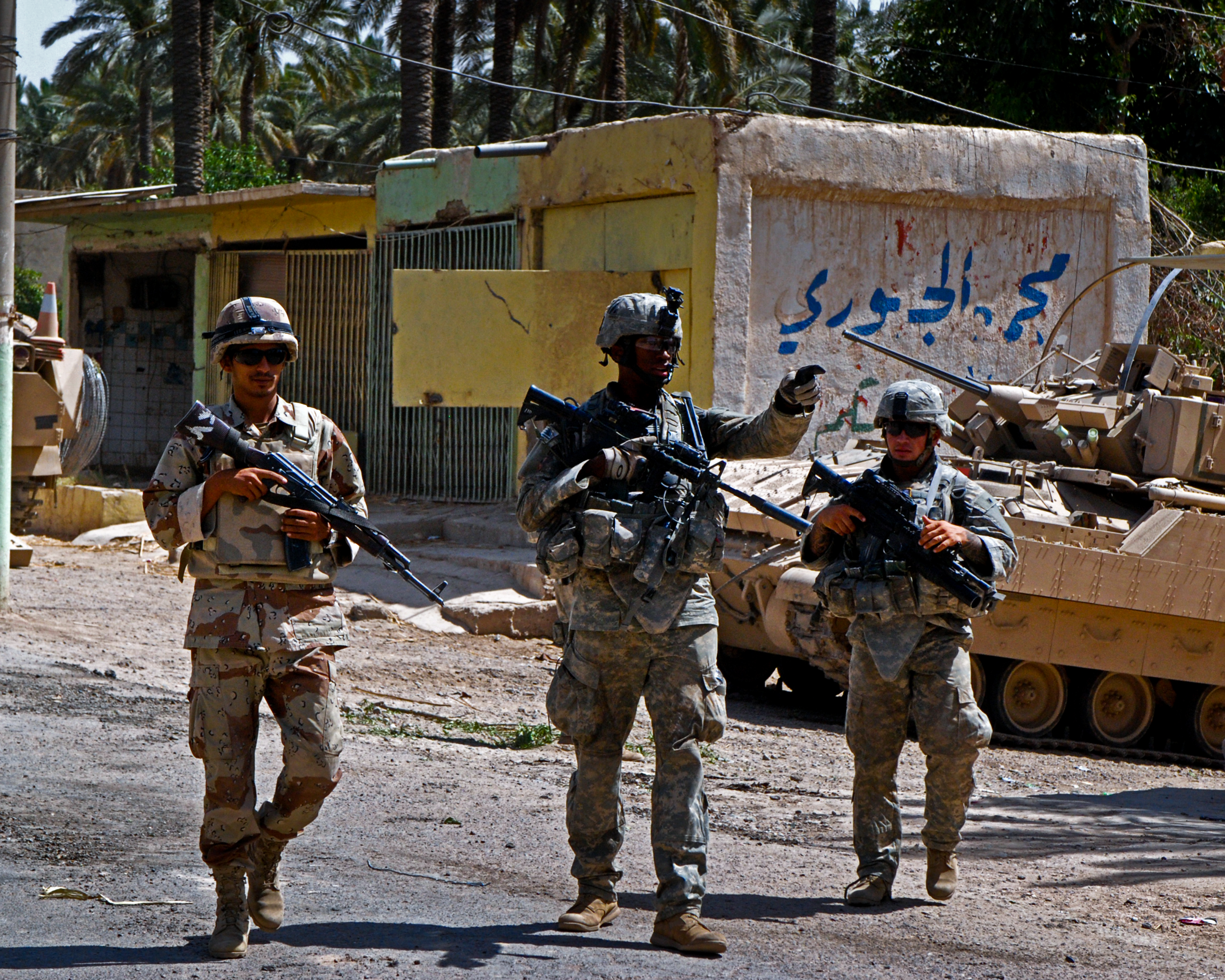
Coalition Soldiers patrol a street in Arab Jabour during Marne Torch I

As part of the "troop surge" in the summer of 2007, MND-C initiated Operation Marne Torch I on 15 June 2007. Marne Torch I consisted of both kinetic and non-kinetic operations, and was launched to establish a security presence on both sides of the Tigris River valley, an area that did not have a large coalition presence and was under insurgent control. According to MND-C Commander Major General Rick Lynch the operation was specifically designed to "block accelerants of violence into Baghdad, secure the population and defeat sectarian violence". Lynch said "Accelerants are defined as anything – insurgents, weapons, materiel, IEDs, VBIEDs, ideology, anything – that, left uncontrolled, would affect the security in Baghdad." While Marne Torch was intelligence-driven, it had three primary characteristics:

- Speed: Coalition ground units would secure insurgent-held areas and quickly transition to a hold strategy.
- Violence: The insurgency would be struck efficiently and with overwhelming firepower from the ground and air.
- Engagement: US and Iraqi forces would solicit cooperation from the populace by restoring and improving the local infrastructure.

During this phase, more than 1,100 structures were cleared, 83 insurgents killed, and more than 850 citizens were entered into a biometric identification system. However, Coalition forces failed to transition to a holding strategy as the insurgent network was too entrenched and Iraqi security forces were too immature.

American air power was used extensively during Marne Torch I. During the operation more than 70 air strikes were conducted, including attacks by US Air Force B-1B bomber and F-16C strike aircraft, as well as US Navy F/A-18E Hornets. The new XM982 Excalibur satellite-guided artillery round was also used to target insurgent leaders hiding among the local populace. One example of this particular weapon system being effectively employed, in conjunction with fluid coordination between other American air support assets, occurred on 14 July: Coalition forces received intelligence reports that an Iraqi Al-Qaeda cell leader Abu Jurah and 14 insurgents were meeting at a house in Arab Jabour. The cell was reported to be responsible for IED, VBIED, and indirect fire attacks on Coalition forces. At 13:12 UTC, the meeting house was positively identified. Two XM982 Excalibur rounds were fired from a M109 Paladin 155mm battery based at Camp Falcon and destroyed the house. An unmanned Predator orbiting overhead observed personnel leaving the rubble of the meeting house, loading wounded persons into a sedan, and driving away. An AH-64 Apache helicopter gunship flew over the area and destroyed the sedan. Three more personnel were observed running from the remnants of the meeting house into a nearby structure. A US Air Force F-16 reported on station and dropped two 500-pound GPS-guided bombs on the structure. A bomb damage assessment confirmed Jurah's death.

Soldiers on the ground also had the advantage of ubiquitous OH-58D Kiowas patrolling the sky that provided near-instantaneous visual reconnaissance and fire support. The 3rd Combat Aviation Brigade that operated the Kiowas was responsible for over 70% of insurgent casualties. On 2 July an insurgent leader on the most wanted list was captured in Arab Jabour. In mid-July, MND-C transitioned to Operation Marne Avalanche.

== Marne Torch II ==
Marne Torch II was launched on 15 September 2007 in the Hawr Rajab area. Supported by 700 Iraqis from the newly created Sons of Iraq group from Arab Jabour, Coalition forces continued along the west bank of the Tigris river, killing or capturing 250 insurgents, destroying twelve boats being used by the insurgents to funnel weapons into Baghdad, and uncovering 40 weapon caches, often with tips from the Sons of Iraq.

Coalition forces also established new patrol bases in Arab Jabour, which allowed them to push further south into insurgent sanctuaries in future operations like Operation Phantom Phoenix. It also allowed Iraqis to feel secure enough to come forward and volunteer for the awakening movements.
