= EAFB =

EAFB can refer to:

- Edwards Air Force Base
- Joint Base Elmendorf-Richardson
- Ellsworth Air Force Base
- Elmendorf Field
