= Elmendorf Air Force Base =

US military facility in Anchorage, Alaska

- Anchorage, Alaska in the United States of America
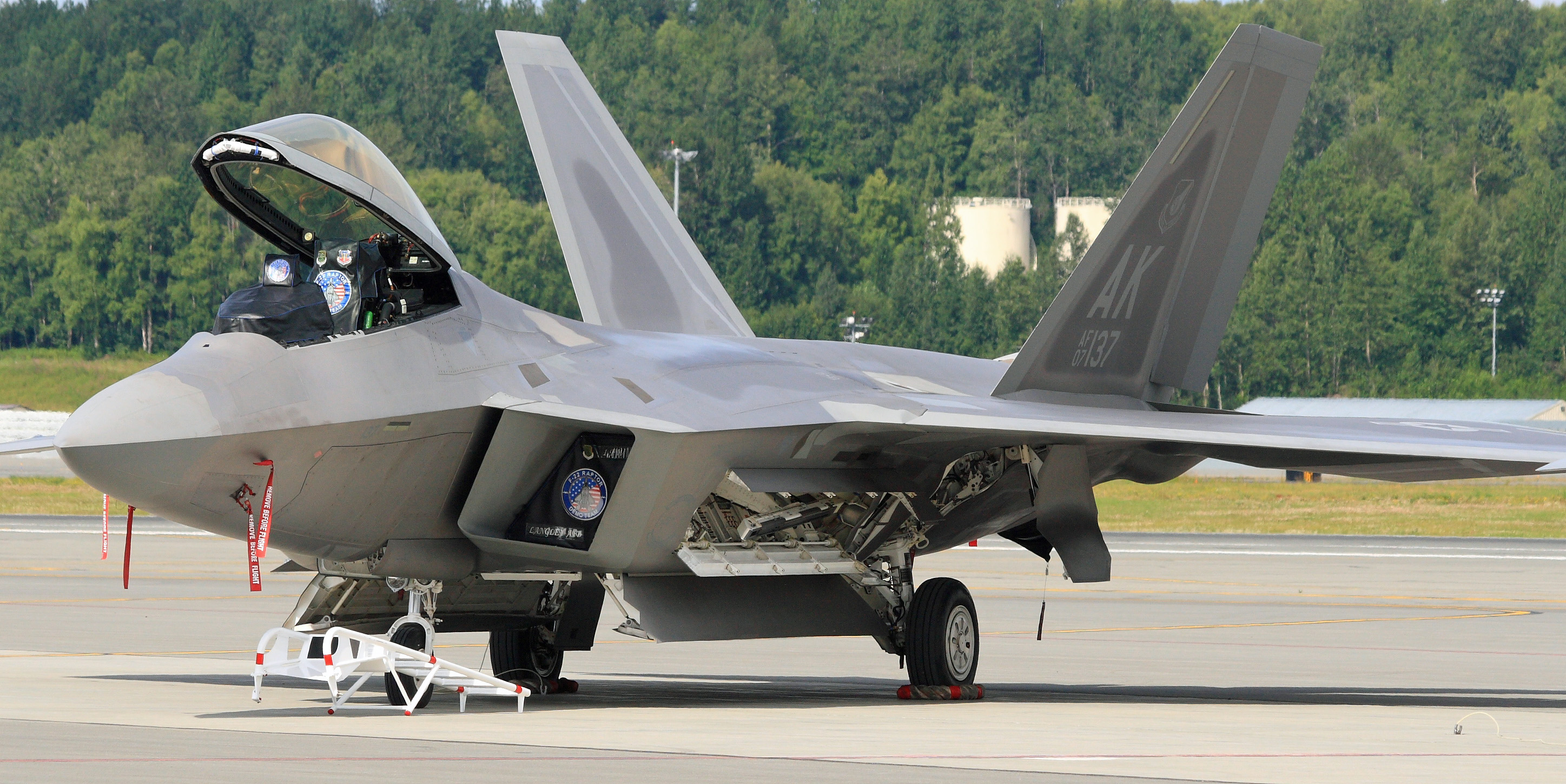
- A F-22 Raptor of the 3rd Wing at Elmendorf AFB during 2010

Site information
- Type: US Air Force base
- Owner: Department of Defense
- Operator: US Air Force
- Website: www.elmendorf.af.mil

Location
- Coordinates: 61°15′10″N 149°47′36″W

Site history
- Built: 1940 (as Elmendorf Field)
- In use: 1940 – 2010; 2010 – present (as Joint Base)
- Fate: Merged in 2010 to become an element of Joint Base Elmendorf-Richardson

Airfield information
- Identifiers: IATA: EDF, ICAO: PAED, FAA LID: EDF, WMO: 702720
- Elevation: 64.9 metres (213 ft) AMSL
Runways
Direction	Length and surface
06/24	3,048 metres (10,000 ft) asphalt
16/34	2,283.8 metres (7,493 ft) asphalt

Elmendorf Air Force Base (IATA: EDF, ICAO: PAED, FAA LID: EDF) is a United States Air Force (USAF) facility in Anchorage, Alaska. Originally known as Elmendorf Field, it became Elmendorf Air Force Base after World War II.

It is the home of the Headquarters, Alaskan Air Command (ALCOM), Alaskan NORAD Region (ANR), Eleventh Air Force (11 AF), the 673d Air Base Wing, the 3rd Wing, the 176th Wing and other tenant units.

In 2010, it was amalgamated with nearby Fort Richardson to form Joint Base Elmendorf-Richardson. The adjacent facilities were officially combined by the 2005 Base Closure and Realignment Commission. Its mission is to support and defend U.S. interests in the Asia-Pacific region and around the world by providing units who are ready for worldwide air power projection and a base that is capable of meeting United States Pacific Command's theater staging and throughput requirements.

== Units ==
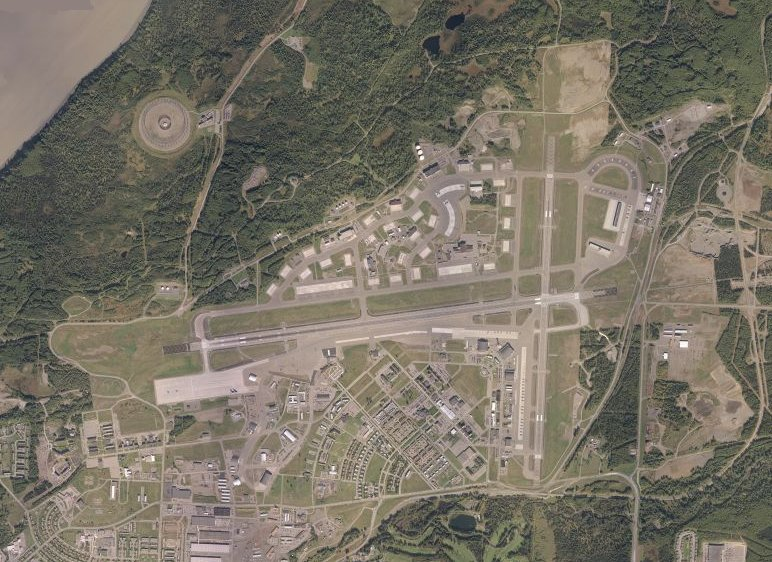
Aerial image of Elmendorf during 2002

The installation hosts the headquarters for the United States Alaskan Command, 11th Air Force, U.S. Army Alaska, and the Alaskan North American Aerospace Defense Command Region.

Major units assigned are:

- 673d Air Base Wing

Activated on 30 July 2010 as the host wing combining installation management functions of Elmendorf AFB's 3rd Wing and U.S. Army Garrison Fort Richardson. The 673d ABW comprises over 5,500 joint military and civilian personnel, supporting America's Arctic Warriors and their families. The wing supports and enables three USAF total-force wings, two U.S. Army Brigades and 55 other tenant units. In addition, the wing provides medical care to over 35,000 joint service members, dependents, Veterans Affairs patients and retirees throughout Alaska. The 673d ABW maintains an $11.4B infrastructure encompassing 84,000 acres (34,000 ha), ensuring Joint Base Elmendorf-Richardson remains America's premier strategic power projection platform.

- Alaskan Air Command

Responsible for maximizing theater force readiness for 21,000 Alaskan servicemembers and expediting worldwide contingency force deployments from and through Alaska as directed by the Commander, United States Northern Command.

- United States Army Alaska (US)

U.S. Army Alaska executes continuous training and readiness oversight responsibilities for Army Force Generation in Alaska. Supports U.S. Pacific Command Theater Security Cooperation Program. On order, executes Joint Force Land Component Command functions in support of Homeland Defense and Security in Alaska.

- 3rd Wing (USAF)

To support and defend U.S. interests in the Asia-Pacific region and around the world by providing units who are ready for worldwide air power projection and a base that is capable of meeting PACOM's theater staging and throughput requirements.

- 176th Wing (ANG)

Composite wing of the Alaska Air National Guard flying the C-17 Globemaster, C-130 Hercules, HC-130 Hercules and HH-60 Pavehawk. Previously located at the former Kulis Air National Guard Base until relocated to Elmendorf per BRAC action.

- 477th Fighter Group (AFRC)

Air Force Reserve Command "Associate" unit to the active duty 3d Wing; operates and maintains the F-22 Raptor.

- Alaskan Norad Region

The Alaskan NORAD Region (ANR) conducts aerospace control within its area of operations and contributes to NORAD's aerospace warning mission.

- Eleventh Air Force

Provide ready warriors and infrastructure for homeland defense, decisive force projection, and aerospace command and control.

== Civil Air Patrol ==
- Alaska Wing Civil Air Patrol

Elmendorf AFB also hosts the headquarters for the Alaska Wing of the Civil Air Patrol, the Civilian Auxiliary of the U.S. Air Force. There are also two units that are hosted on base, AK-017 17th Composite Squadron and AK-099 Alaska State Legislative Squadron.

== Demographics ==
Historical population
Census	Pop.	Note	%±
1970	6,018		—
U.S. Decennial Census

Elmendorf Air Force Base appeared once on the 1970 U.S. Census as an unincorporated area. Because it was located within the confines of the Anchorage Census Division, it was consolidated into the City of Anchorage in 1975.

== History ==
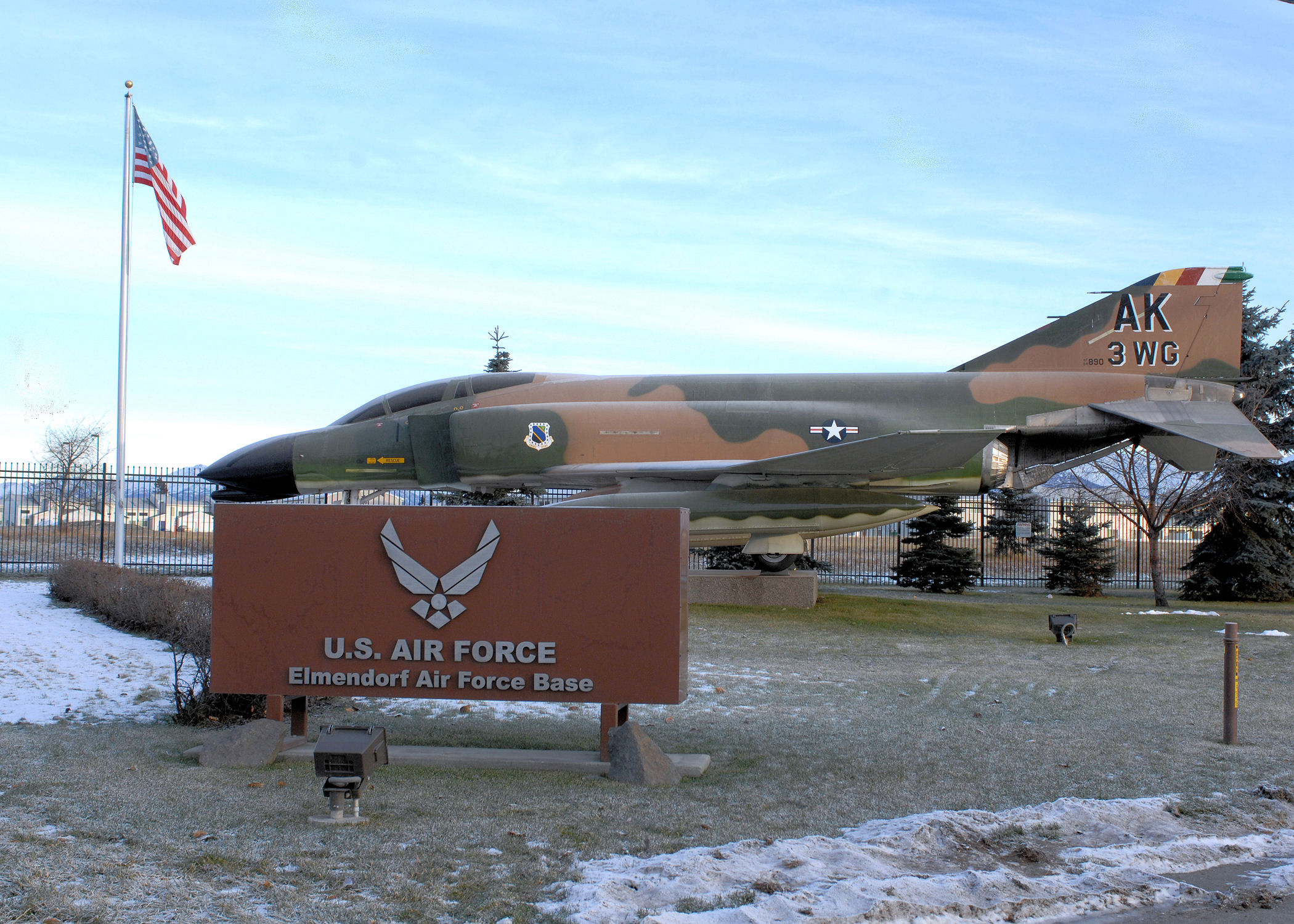
Elmendorf Air Force Base sign outside of Government Hill Gate

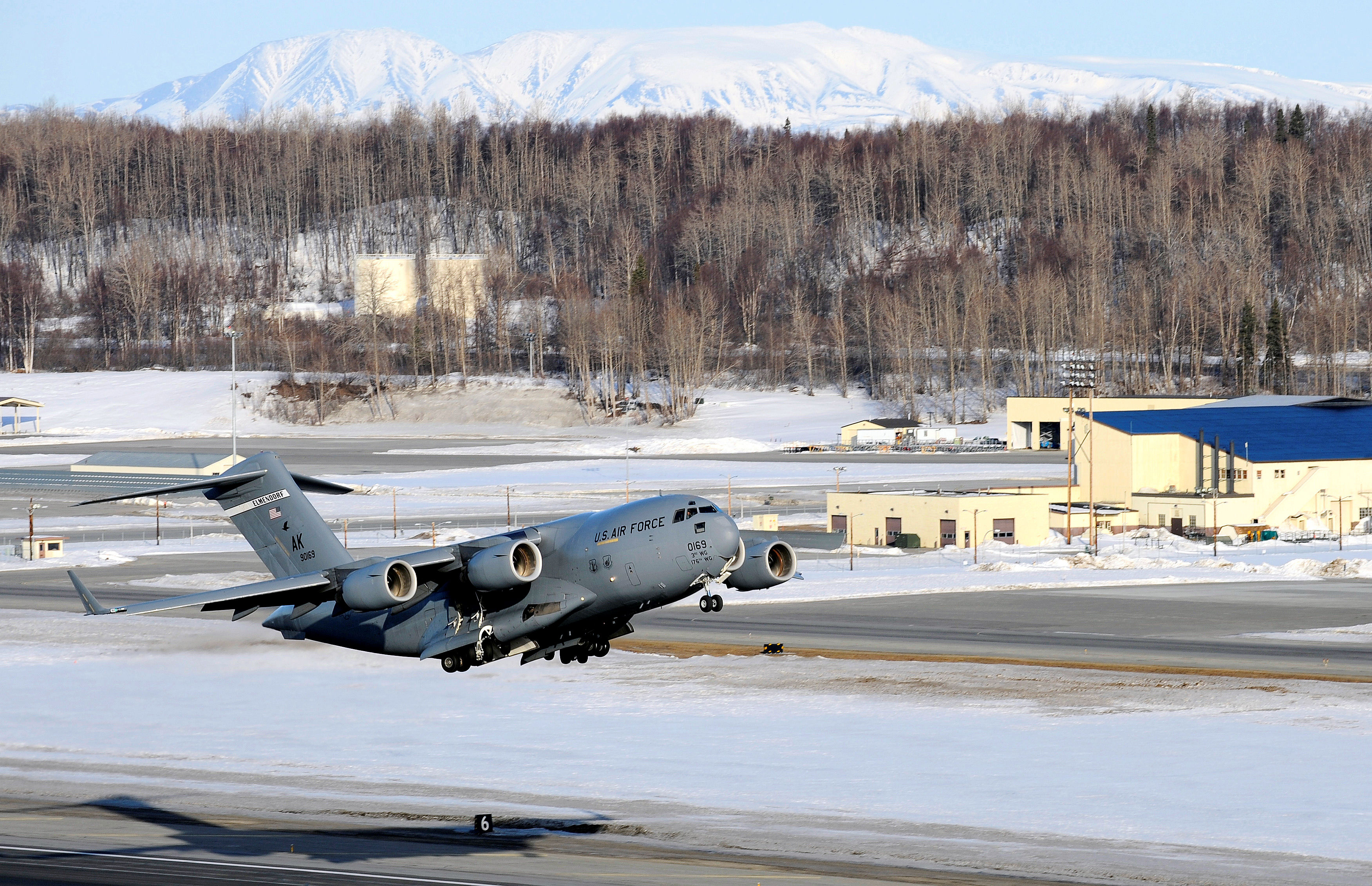
A C-17 Globemaster III taking off from Elmendorf Air Force Base on 26 March 2010

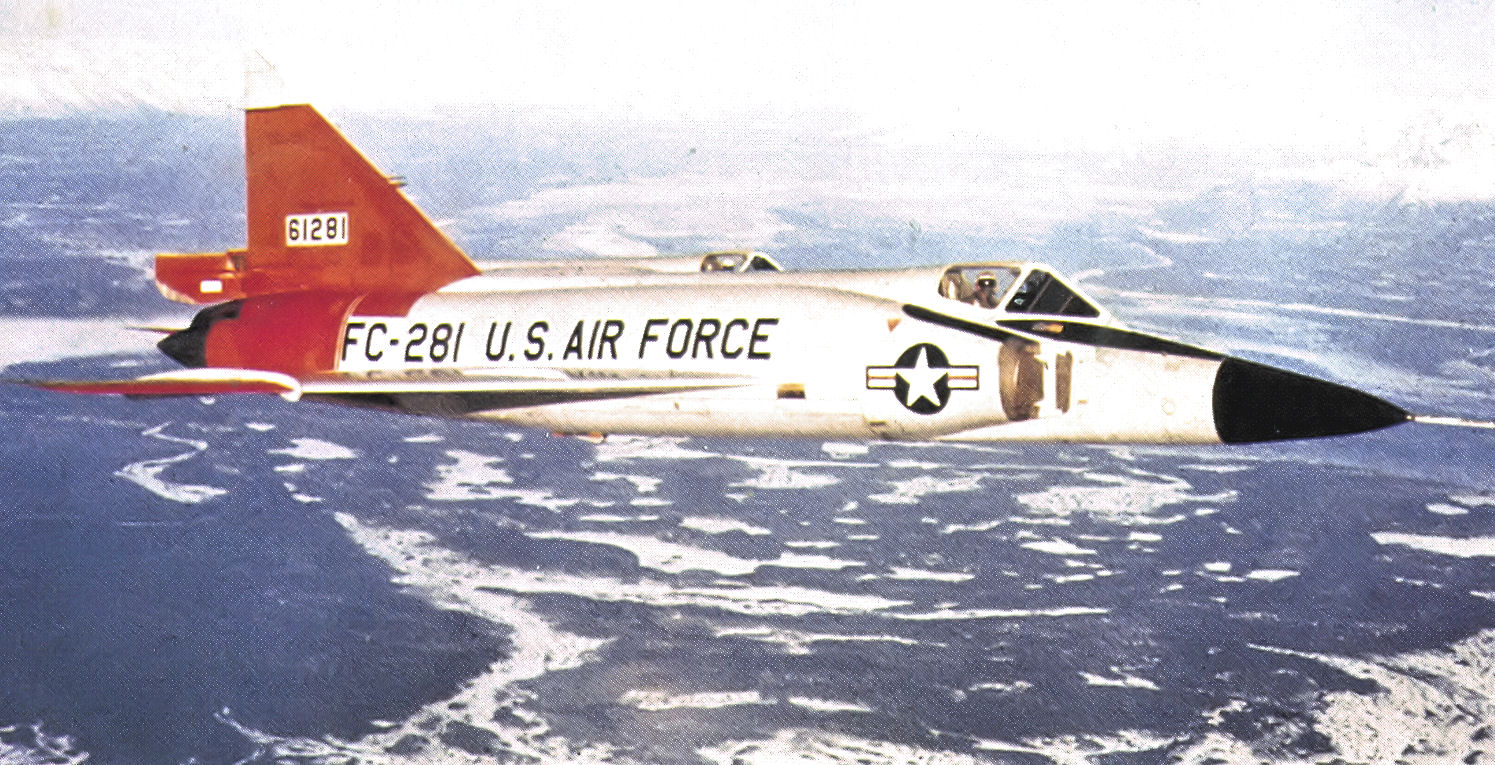
31st Fighter Interceptor Squadron Convair F-102A-75-CO Delta Dagger 56-1281, 1965. Aircraft crashed on 27 December 1967.

=== World War II ===
Construction on Elmendorf Field began on 8 June 1940, as a major and permanent military airfield near Anchorage. The first United States Army Air Corps personnel arrived on 12 August 1940. On 12 November 1940, the War Department formally designated what had been popularly referred to as Elmendorf Field as Fort Richardson. The air facilities on the post were named Elmendorf Field in honor of Captain Hugh M. Elmendorf, killed on 13 January 1933, while flight testing the experimental Consolidated Y1P-25, fighter, 32-321, near Wright Field, Ohio.

The first Army Air Corps unit to be assigned to Alaska was the 18th Pursuit Squadron, which arrived in February 1941. The 23d Air Base Group was assigned shortly afterward to provide base support. More units from the United States Army Air Forces (which legally changed its name in June 1941) poured into Alaska as the Japanese threat developed into World War II in the aftermath of the surprise attack on Pearl Harbor in December 1941. The Eleventh Air Force was formed at Elmendorf AFB in early 1942. The field played a vital role as the main air logistics center and staging area during the Aleutian Islands Campaign and later air operations against the Kurile Islands.

After World War II, the Army moved its operations to the new Fort Richardson and following the separation from the Army in 1947, the newly-formed United States Air Force (USAF) assumed control of the original Fort Richardson and renamed it Elmendorf Air Force Base.

=== Cold War ===
Following World War II, Elmendorf assumed an increasing role in the defense of North America as the uncertain wartime relations between the United States and the Soviet Union deteriorated into the Cold War. The Eleventh Air Force was redesignated as the Alaskan Air Command (AAC) on 18 December 1945. The Alaskan Command, established 1 January 1947, also headquartered at Elmendorf, was a unified command under the Joint Chiefs of Staff based on lessons learned during World War II when a lack of unity of command hampered operations to drive the Japanese from the western Aleutian Islands of Attu and Kiska.

The uncertain world situation in late 1940s and early 1950s caused a major buildup of air defense forces in Alaska. The propeller-driven P-51s were replaced with F-80 jets, which in turn were replaced in succession by F-94s, F-89s, and F-102s interceptor aircraft for defense of North America. The Air Force built an extensive aircraft control and warning radar system with sites located throughout Alaska's interior and coastal regions. Additionally, the USAF of necessity built the White Alice Communications System (with numerous support facilities around the state) to provide reliable communications to these far-flung, isolated, and often rugged locales. The Alaskan NORAD Regional Operations Control Center (ROCC) at Elmendorf served as the nerve center for all air defense operations in Alaska.

The U.S. Air Force Security Service (USAFSS) activated the 6981st Security Group tasked with monitoring, collecting and interpreting signals intelligence of concern to the region, including installation of an AN/FLR-9 antenna array as part of a worldwide network known collectively as "Iron Horse".

Air defense forces reached their zenith in 1957 with almost 200 fighter aircraft assigned to six fighter interceptor squadrons located at Elmendorf AFB and Ladd AFB. Eighteen aircraft control and warning radar sites controlled their operations. Elmendorf earned the motto "Top Cover for North America". AAC adopted the motto as its own in 1969.

The late 1950s, 1960s, and early 1970s brought about a gradual, but significant decline in air defense forces in Alaska due to mission changes and the demands of the Vietnam War. The USAF inactivated five fighter squadrons and closed five radar sites. In 1961, the Department of Defense (DoD) consigned Ladd AFB to the Army which renamed it Fort Wainwright. The Alaskan Command was disestablished in 1975. Elmendorf began providing more support to other USAF commands, particularly Military Airlift Command C-5 Galaxy and C-141 Starlifter flights to and from the Far East.

Despite a diminished number of personnel and aircraft, a turning point in Elmendorf's history occurred in 1970 with the arrival of the 43d Tactical Fighter Squadron in June 1970 from MacDill AFB, Florida flying the F-4E Phantom II. The squadron gave AAC an air-to-ground capability which was further enhanced with the activation of the 18th Tactical Fighter Squadron at Elmendorf (also with the F-4E) on 1 October 1977.

The strategic importance of Elmendorf AFB was graphically realized during the spring of 1980 when the 18th Tactical Fighter Squadron deployed eight of its F-4Es to South Korea to participate in exercise Team Spirit. It was a historical first and underlined an increasing emphasis AAC placed on its tactical role. The strategic location of Elmendorf AFB and Alaska made it an excellent deployment center, a fact that validated the contention of Billy Mitchell who, in 1935, stated that "Alaska is the most strategic place in the world". Deployments from Elmendorf AFB and Eielson AFB to the Far East are now conducted on a routine basis.

The 1980s witnessed a period of growth and modernization of Elmendorf AFB. During 1982, the 21st Tactical Fighter Wing converted from F-4Es to F-15A/B Eagles. The 18th Tactical Fighter Squadron was assigned to Eielson AFB where it was equipped with A-10 Thunderbolt IIs. The 54th Tactical Fighter Squadron, of Aleutian Campaign fame, activated once again in 1987. Operating two F-15 squadrons (43rd and 54th TFS), the F-15s were housed next to the 5021st Tactical Operations Squadron's T-33 Shooting Stars. Rounding out the modernization program was the construction of an enhanced Regional Operations Control Center (completed in 1983), and the replacement of the 1950s generation aircraft control and warning radars with the state of the art AN/FPS-117 Minimally Attended Radars. The integrated air warning and defense system became fully operational in mid-1985. Alaska's air defense force was further enhanced with the assignment of two E-3 Sentry AWACS aircraft to Elmendorf AFB in 1986. The Alaskan Command was re-established at Elmendorf in 1989 as subunified joint service command under the Pacific Command in recognition of Alaska's military importance in the Pacific region.

Elmendorf AFB was a site of one of the now decommissioned FLR-9 Wullenweber-class antennas, a node of the now obsolete High Frequency SIGINT direction finding system.

In the 1983 film WarGames, Elmendorf AFB was mentioned as one of the first three targets to be destroyed in the (simulated) full scale Soviet nuclear strike in the climax of the film.

=== 1991–2010 ===
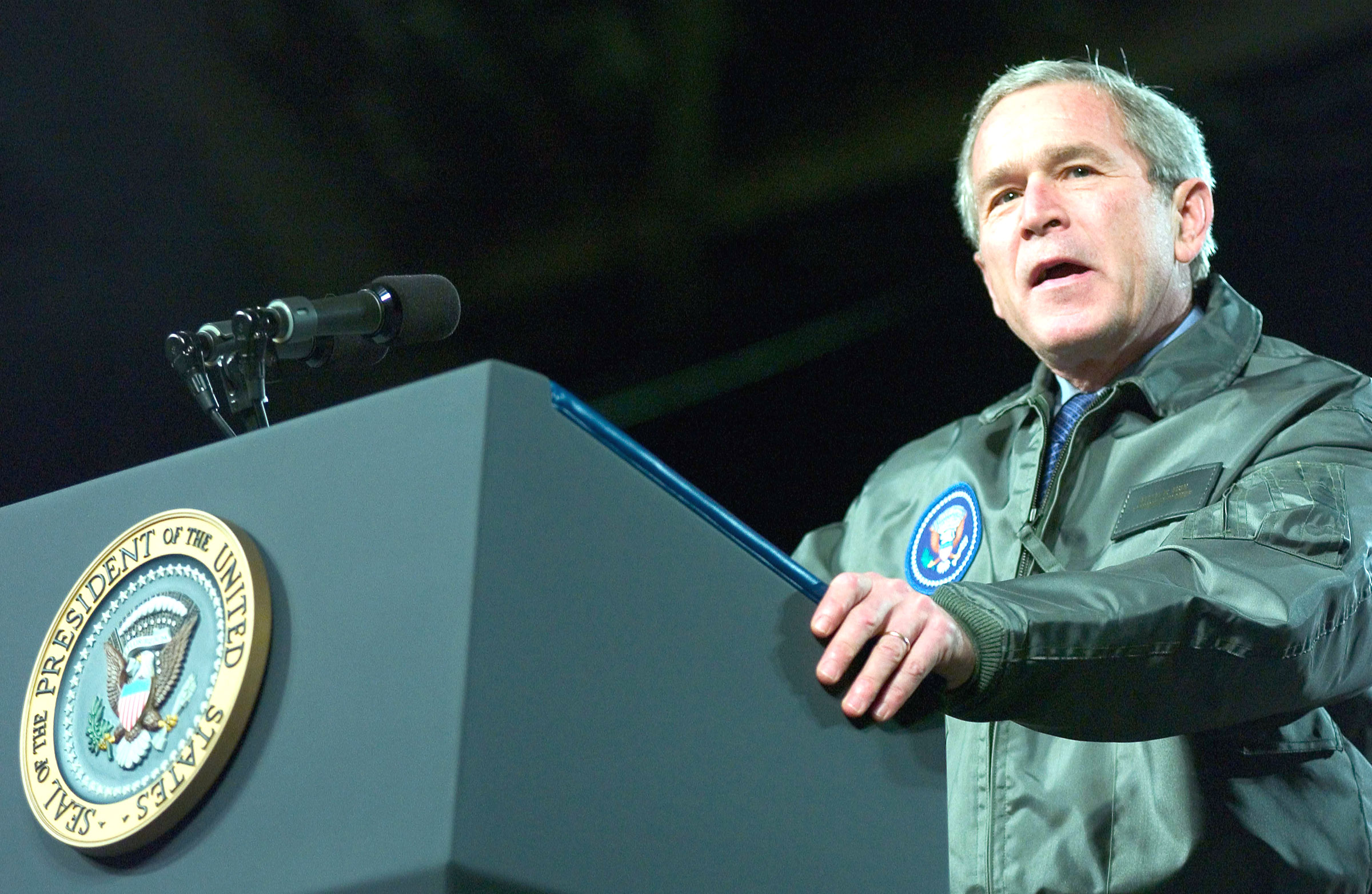
President George W. Bush speaks to troops at Elmendorf in 2005

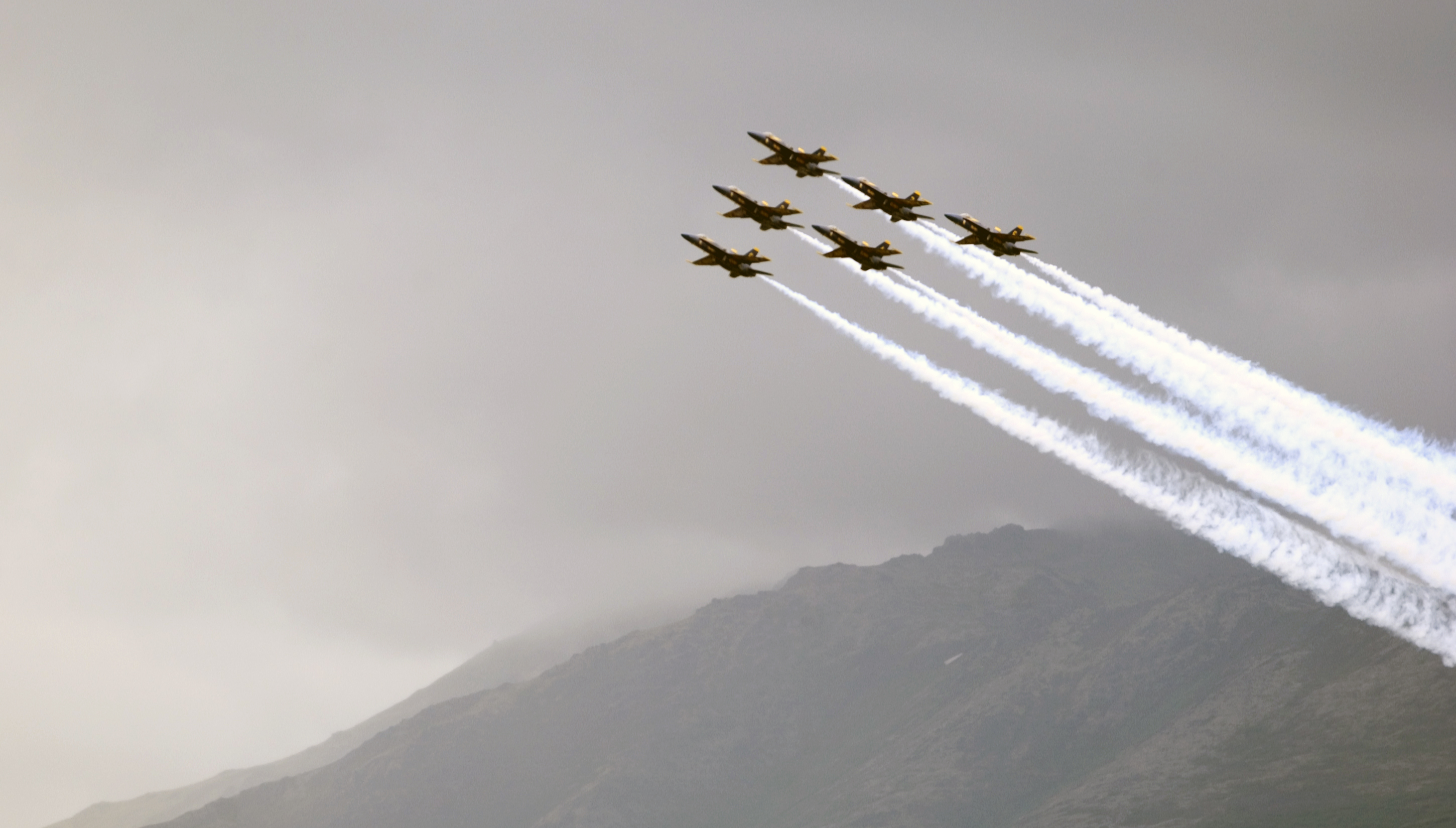
Six Blue Angels F/A-18 Hornets flying in delta formation into the rainy mists surrounding Elmendorf AFB during Arctic Thunder, August 2006

Alaska's military importance in the Pacific region was further recognized when the F-15E Strike Eagle-equipped 90th Tactical Fighter Squadron was reassigned to Elmendorf AFB from Clark Air Base in the Philippines in May 1991. The Pacific Regional Medical Center moved from Clark to Elmendorf and construction of a new, greatly expanded hospital began in 1993. In the early 1990s there were major organizational changes and an expansion of Elmendorf's importance. In 1991, the 21st Tactical Fighter Wing was reorganized as an objective wing and all the major tenant units on Elmendorf were placed under it. The 21st Wing was inactivated and the 3d Wing was reassigned from Clark AB to Elmendorf AFB on 19 December 1991. This was in keeping with the USAF's policies of retaining the oldest and most illustrious units during a period of major force reductions. It was also an alternative landing site for the Space Shuttle.

The DoD proposed a major realignment of the base as part of the Base Realignment and Closure recommendations announced on 13 May 2005. Under the plan, one F-15E and one F-15C squadron were replaced with the F-22, and the C-130 fleet has been replaced with the C-17 Globemaster III.

The base (now Joint Base Elmendorf-Richardson) hosts the headquarters of the Alaska Wing of the Civil Air Patrol.

== Major commands to which assigned ==
- Alaskan Defense Force (June 1940 – February 1941)
- Alaskan Defense Command (February – May 1941)
- Air Field Forces, Alaskan Defense Command (May – December 1941)
- Alaskan Air Force (December 1941 – February 1942)
- Eleventh Air Force (February – September 1942)
- Alaskan Air Command (December 1945 – August 1990)
- Pacific Air Forces (since August 1990)

== Base operating units ==
- 1st Battalion, 4th Infantry Regiment, US(June 1940 – February 1941)
  (initial base complement)
- 23d Air Base Group (February 1941 – July 1942)
- 23d Service Group (July 1942 – January 1948)
- 23d Air Service Group (January – April 1948)
- 57th Airdrome Group (April – September 1948)
- 57th Air Base Group (September 1948 – January 1951)
- 39th Air Depot Wing (January 1951 – April 1953)
- 5039th Air Base Wing (April 1953 – October 1957)
- 5040th Air Base Wing (October 1957 – February 1959)
- 5040th Air Base Wing (August 1960 – July 1966)
- 21st Air Base Group (July 1966 – January 1980)
- 21st Combat Support Group (January 1980 – December 1991)
- 3d Wing (December 1991 – July 2010)
- 673d Air Base Wing (July 2010 – present)

== Major units assigned ==
- 28th Bombardment Group (Composite) (February 1941 – March 1943)
- 343rd Fighter Group (September 1942 – March 1943)
- 93rd Air Depot Group (May 1944 – September 1946)
- 28th Bombardment Group (June 1946 – June 1948)
- 57th Fighter Group (March 1947 – April 1953)
- 64th, 65th, 66th Fighter-Interceptor Squadrons (June 1947 – November 1957)
- 5039th Air Depot Wing (September 1948 – January 1951)
- 39th Air Depot Wing (January 1951 – April 1953)
- 5039th Air Base Wing (April 1953 – June 1957)
- 5040th Air Base Wing (June 1957 – July 1966)
  (Under 10th Air Division until August 1960)
- 5070th Air Defense Wing AAC (1 August 1960 – 1 October 1961) with
  317th Fighter Interceptor Squadron (25 August 1960 – 1 October 1961)
- 602nd Military Airlift Support Squadron (62MAW, McChord AFB, WA) (about 1966–1970 – exact dates unknown at this time)
- 21st Tactical Fighter Wing (May 1966 – December 1991)
- 343d Tactical Fighter Wing (November 1977 – January 1980)
- 381st Intelligence Squadron (1955–present)
  (6981st with various unit designations under USAFSS)
- 3rd Wing (December 1991 – present)

== Aviation accidents ==
On September 9, 1958, a USAF Douglas SC-47 stalled after takeoff from Elmendorf AFB and crashed, killing 13 of 20 occupants. Engine failure was blamed as the cause of the crash.

On December 26, 1968, a commercial Pan American Boeing 707 landed at Elmendorf AFB instead of Anchorage International Airport because of weather conditions. Clearance was delayed several times to accommodate other traffic. When they finally got clearance, the crew didn't lower their wing flaps as required to achieve successful takeoff because the pre-takeoff checklist lacked a vital item to lower flaps, and the captain had raised flaps during the taxiing phase to prevent icing as required by the carrier's cold weather operations procedures. The jet crashed just off the west end of the runway, killing all crew members. Cargo consisting of mail and food packages was largely consumed by ground fire following impact. The National Transportation Safety Board's report found the probable cause to be (a) the defective checklist, (b) the 707's defective takeoff warning hardware, (c) ineffective implementation of Boeing's Service Bulletins, and (d) stress caused by a rushed flight schedule.

On 22 September 1995, a Boeing E-3 Sentry Airborne early warning and control aircraft with 22 USAF personnel and two RCAF air crew members crashed after ingesting a flock of Canada geese, killing all on board. The aircraft, serial number 77-0354, and using call sign Yukla 27, lost power in two of the four engines, subsequently crashing into a wooded area less than 1-mile (1.6 km) from the end of the runway.

On 28 July 2010, a USAF Boeing C-17 Globemaster III cargo aircraft practicing for an upcoming airshow crashed into a wooded area within the base, killing all four air crew members; three from the Alaska Air National Guard and one from the USAF. The cause of the accident has been reported to be pilot error. The pilot performed an aggressive righthand turn and ignored the aircraft's stall warning, continuing the turn until the aircraft stalled due to lack of airspeed. The low altitude of the turn made it impossible for the crew to recover from the stall in time to avoid impacting the ground.

On 16 November 2010, a USAF Lockheed Martin F-22 Raptor took off for a training mission. At approximately 1900 hrs., the base reported that the aircraft was overdue and missing. USAF rescue teams were reported to be concentrating their search for the missing plane and pilot in Denali National Park. The F-22's crash site was found about 100 miles (160 km) north of Anchorage near the town of Cantwell, Alaska. The pilot, of the 525th Fighter Squadron, was killed in the crash.

== See also ==
- Alaska World War II Army Airfields
- Arctic Thunder Air Show
- United States Pacific Air Forces
