= 673d Communications Squadron =

US Air Force unit

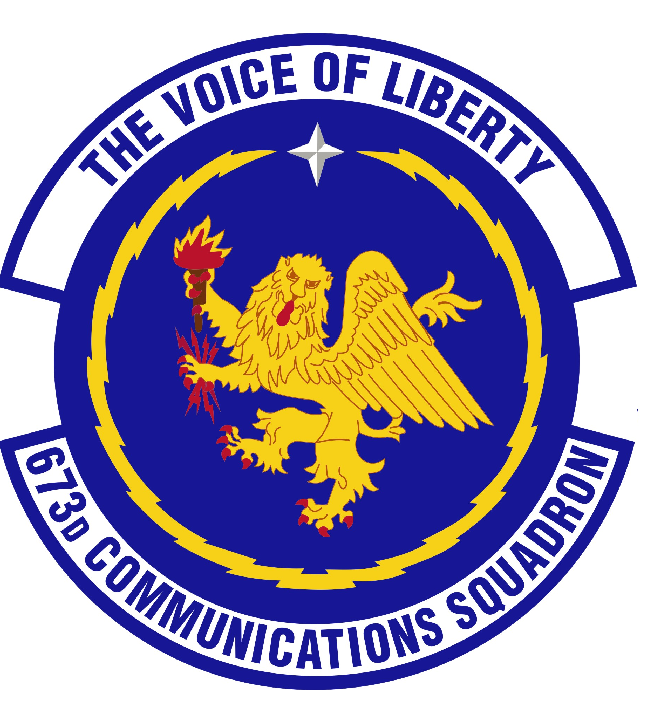
Emblem of the 673d Communications Squadron

The 673d Communications Squadron is a base support / mission support communications squadron of the United States Air Force. It is stationed at Joint Base Elmendorf-Richardson, Alaska, as part of the 673d Air Base Wing. It traces its history to the designation and organization of the 1979th Airways and Air Communications Service (AACS) Squadron at RAF Lakenheath, Suffolk, in the United Kingdom, on 20 October 1951.

The 1979th AACS Squadron was originally assigned to the 1813th AACS Group, Airways and Air Communications Service, in accordance with Military Air Transport Service General Order 125 of 15 October 1951. A little over two years later, on 1 November 1953 it was reassigned to 1807th AACS Wing (MATS GO-198, 14 October 1953). Exactly a year afterwards, on 1 November 1954, it was reassigned to the new 1821st AACS Group (later United Kingdom AACS Region; United Kingdom Airways and Air Communications Services Region; United Kingdom Communications Region) pursuant to MATS General Order 172 of 15 October 1954.

The squadron remained at RAF Lakenheath providing communications services under a periodically changing USAF Communications structure, seeing the departure of the AACS and the arrival of the Air Force Communications Agency, later Air Force Communications Command, until the early 1990s. It is implied by the heraldic description of its badge that it was involved in operations, air traffic control, maintenance and programs communications activities, and that it had a close relationship with the USAF flying wing on base, the 48th Tactical Fighter Wing (the "Liberty Wing"), United States Air Forces in Europe, which flew the General Dynamics F-111 from 1977 to 1992.

On 1 October 1990 the squadron, by now designated the 1979th Communications Squadron, was reassigned from the Air Force Communications structure to the host wing, the 48th TFW. Eight months later, on 1 May 1991, it was inactivated.

Eighteen years later, the squadron was redesignated the 673d Communications Squadron on 14 December 2009. It was then activated half a world away from Lakenheath, at what was then Elmendorf Air Force Base, Alaska, on 24 June 2010. There it became part of a new air base wing to support the merger of Elmendorf Air Force Base with the U.S. Army's Fort Richardson, as part of an agreement that base services would be provided by the USAF. From 24 June 2010 it forms part of the 673d Mission Support Group of the 673d Air Base Wing.

https://www.dafhistory.af.mil/About-Us/Fact-Sheets/Display/Article/432571/673-communications-squadron-pacaf/
