= 381st =

381st may refer to:

- 381st Bombardment Squadron, inactive United States Air Force unit
- 381st Fighter Squadron or 18th Reconnaissance Squadron, squadron of the United States Air Force
- 381st Intelligence Squadron, intelligence unit located at Joint Base Elmendorf-Richardson, Alaska
- 381st Training Group at Vandenberg AFB, California provides training for the nation's space and intercontinental ballistic missile (ICBM) operations

== See also ==
- 381 (number)
- 381, the year 381 (CCCLXXXI) of the Julian calendar
- 381 BC
