= 673d Air Base Wing =

673d Air Base Wing

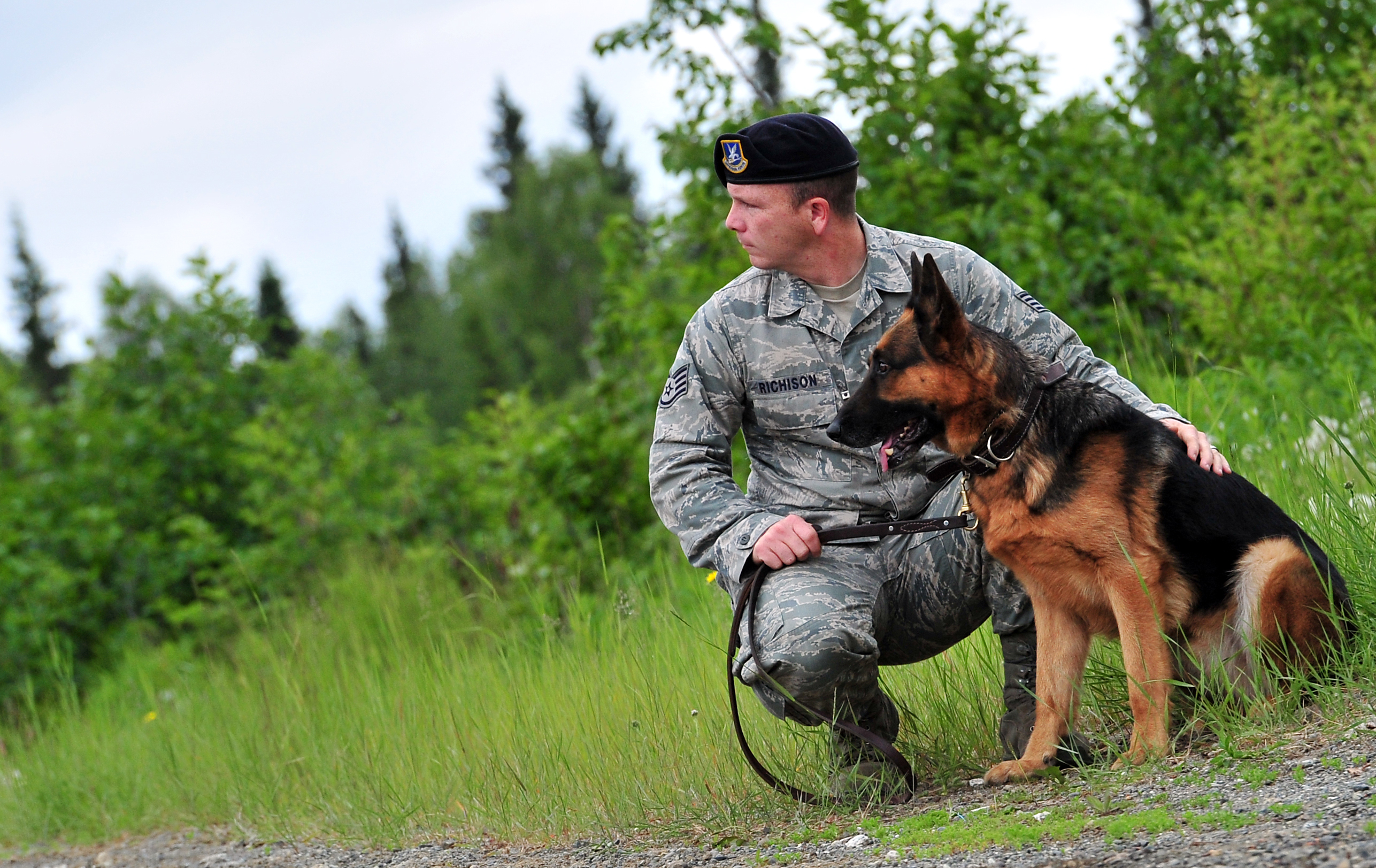
- An airman and military working dog of the 673d Security Forces Squadron
- Active: 2010–present
- Country: United States
- Branch: United States Air Force
- Role: Installation support
- Size: Over 5000 military and civilian
- Part of: Pacific Air Command
- Garrison/HQ: Joint Base Elmendorf-Richardson
- Motto(s): Cavete Ursum Arcticum Latin Beware the Arctic Bear
- Decorations: Air Force Outstanding Unit Award

Commanders
- Current commander: Col. David Wilson
- Command Chief Master Sergeant: CMSgt Daniel Guzman

Insignia
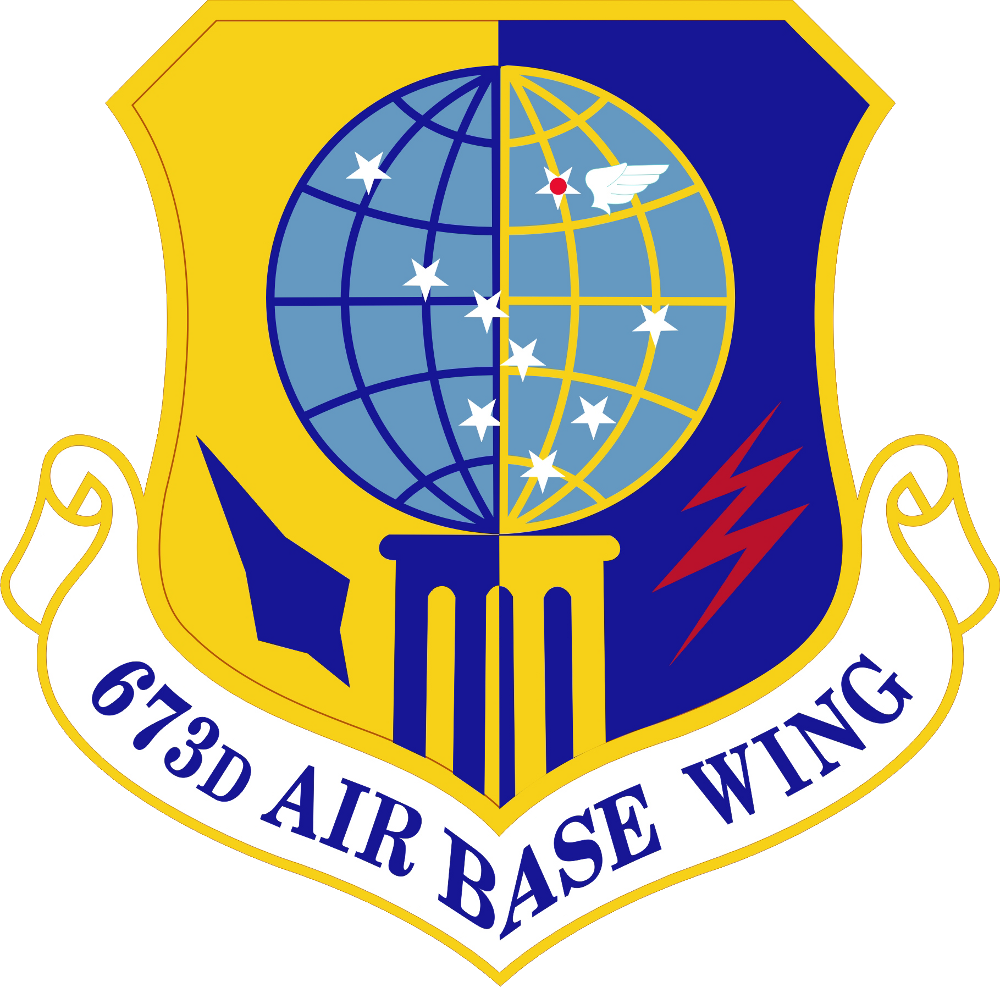
- 673d Air Base Wing emblem (Approved 22 March 2010)

The 673d Air Base Wing is the support unit for Joint Base Elmendorf-Richardson, a combination of the United States Air Force's Elmendorf Air Force Base and the United States Army's Fort Richardson. The 2005 Base Realignment and Closure Commission called for the combination of the two installations. The wing replaced the 673d Air Base Wing (Provisional), which had been formed in January 2009, primarily from elements of the 3d Mission Support Group.

The wing supports three Air Force wings, an Army brigade, and 55 other tenant units. It provides medical care to over 35,000 service members, dependents, Veterans Administration patients and retirees throughout Alaska (including 20% of the population of Anchorage, Alaska). The wing maintains $12.4 Billion in infrastructure encompassing more than 73,000 acres, and more than 1,500 vehicles.

== Components ==
The 673d Wing comprises the 673d Comptroller Squadron, and four groups:

- 673d Civil Engineer Group (673d Civil Engineer Squadron and 773d Civil Engineer Squadron);
- 673d Logistics Readiness Group (673d Logistics Readiness Squadron and 773d Logistics Readiness Squadron);
- 673d Medical Group (673d Aerospace Medicine Squadron, 673d Dental Squadron, 673d Medical Operations Squadron, 673d Medical Support Squadron, 673d Inpatient Operations Squadron and 673d Surgical Operations Squadron);
- 673d Mission Support Group (673d Communications Squadron, 673d Contracting Squadron, 673d Force Support Squadron, 773d Force Support Squadron and 673d Security Forces Squadron).

With their assigned squadrons, the groups assist the wing with operation and maintenance of the joint base for "air sovereignty, combat training, force staging, and throughput operations in support of worldwide contingencies."

== History ==
On 24 July 2010, the 673d Air Base Wing activated as the host wing combining installation management functions of Elmendorf Air Force Base's 3rd Wing and United States Army Garrison Fort Richardson.

Although the wing was newly established, many of its components traced their histories to earlier organizations. The number assigned to the wing was selected because of its use by the wing's 673d Mission Support Group, which had served in Alaska from 1958 to 1995. The 673d Mission Support Group had previously been designated the 5073d Air Base Group and had served at the then-Shemya Air Force Base on Shemya Island from 15 October 1974 – 27 January 1992.

In turn, the group traced its history to the 5021st Air Base Squadron, 1 March 1951; re-designated: 5040th Air Base Squadron, 15 July 1958; redesignated 5073d Air Base Squadron, 1 October 1962; and redesignated 5073d Air Base Group, 15 October 1974 – 27 January 1992.

On 27 January 1992 the 5073rd Air Base Group located at Shemya AFB was re-designated as the 673d Air Base Group (673 ABG), subordinate to the Eleventh Air Force of Pacific Air Forces. The 673d and the base were subsequently reassigned from Eleventh Air Force to the 11th Air Control Wing.

== Lineage ==
- Established on 14 December 2009 as the 673d Air Base Wing

Activated on 24 June 2010

=== Assignments ===
- Eleventh Air Force, 24 June 2010 – present

=== Components ===
- 673d Mission Support Group, 24 June 2010 – present
- 673d Civil Engineer Group, 24 June 2010 – present
- 673d Logistics Readiness Group, 24 June 2010 – present
- 673 Medical Group, 24 June 2010 – present
- 673d Comptroller Squadron, 24 June 2010 – present

=== Stations ===
- Joint Base Elmendorf-Richardson, 24 June 2010 – present

=== Awards ===
Award streamer	Award	Dates	Notes
	Air Force Outstanding Unit Award	24 June 2010 – 31 October 2011	
	Air Force Outstanding Unit Award	1 October 2012 – 30 September 2013	
