= 1995 Alaska Boeing E-3 Sentry accident =

1995 aviation accident in Alaska

United States Air Force Flight 27
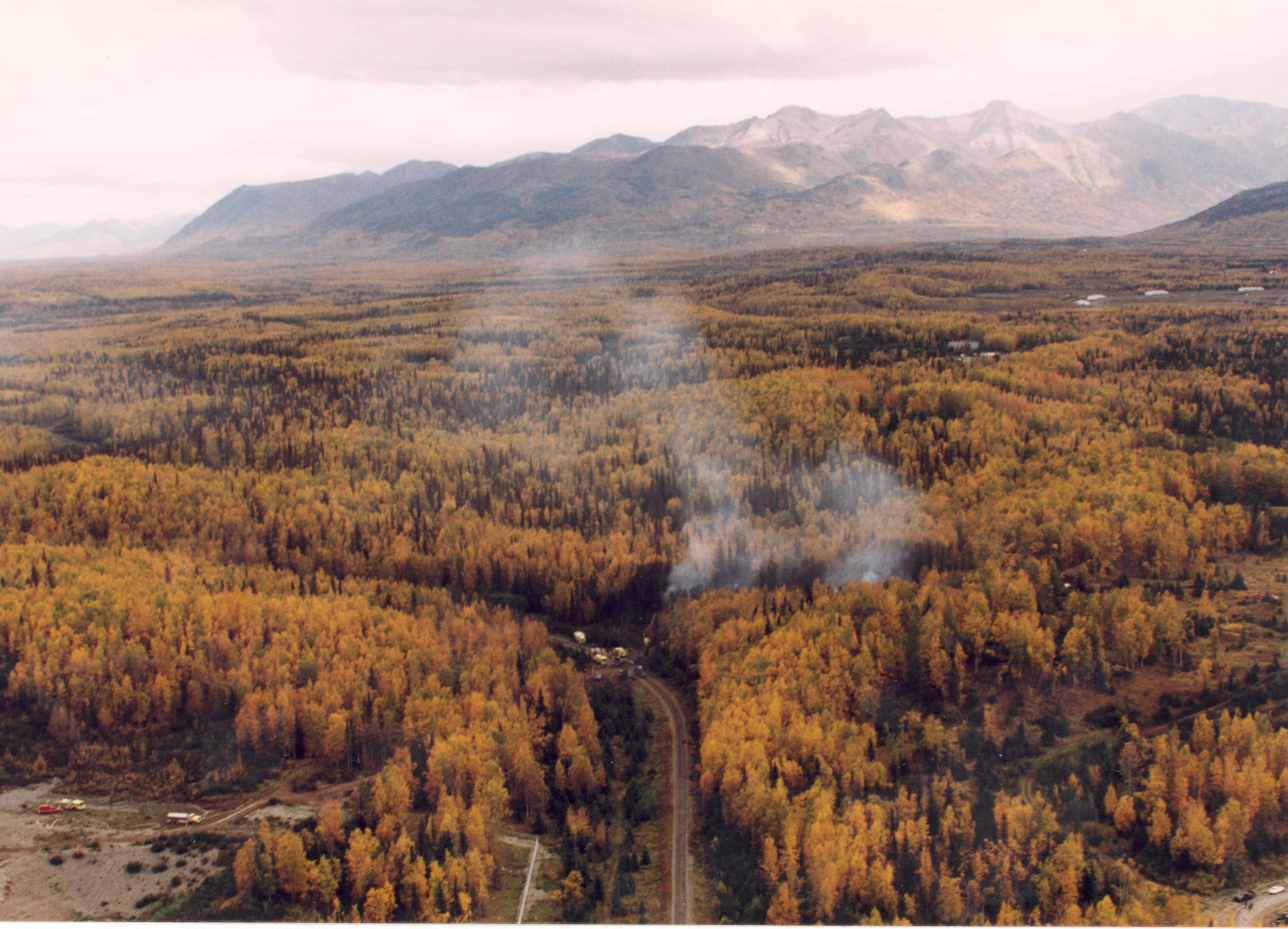
- Aerial view of the crash site

Accident
- Date: September 22, 1995
- Summary: Bird strike on takeoff
- Site: Near Elmendorf Air Force Base, Alaska, United States; 61°15′57″N 149°45′39″W

Aircraft
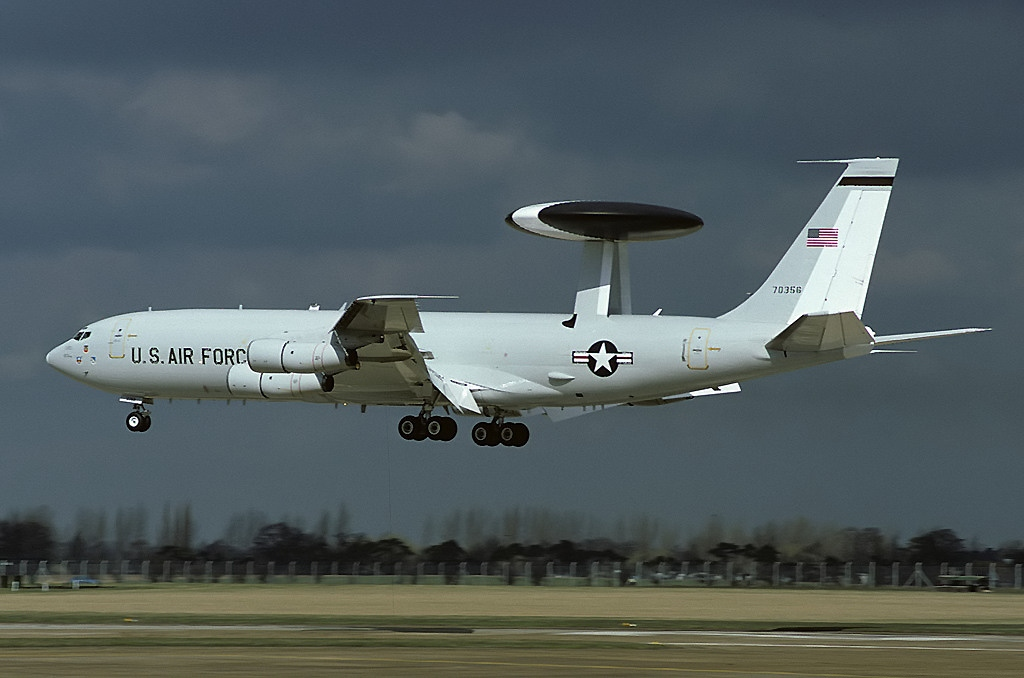
- 77-0356, sister ship to the accident aircraft involved
- Aircraft type: Boeing E-3B Sentry
- Operator: United States Air Force
- Call sign: YUKLA 27
- Registration: 77-0354
- Flight origin: Elmendorf Air Force Base, Alaska, United States
- Destination: Elmendorf Air Force Base, Alaska, United States
- Occupants: 24
- Crew: 24
- Fatalities: 24
- Survivors: 0

The Alaska Boeing E-3 Sentry accident was the September 22, 1995 crash of a United States Air Force Boeing E-3 Sentry airborne early warning aircraft with the loss of all 24 crewmembers on board. The aircraft, serial number 77-0354 with callsign Yukla 27, hit birds on departure from Elmendorf Air Force Base in Alaska, United States. With the loss of thrust from both of the left engines, the aircraft crashed into a wooded area less than a mile from the end of the runway.

== Accident ==
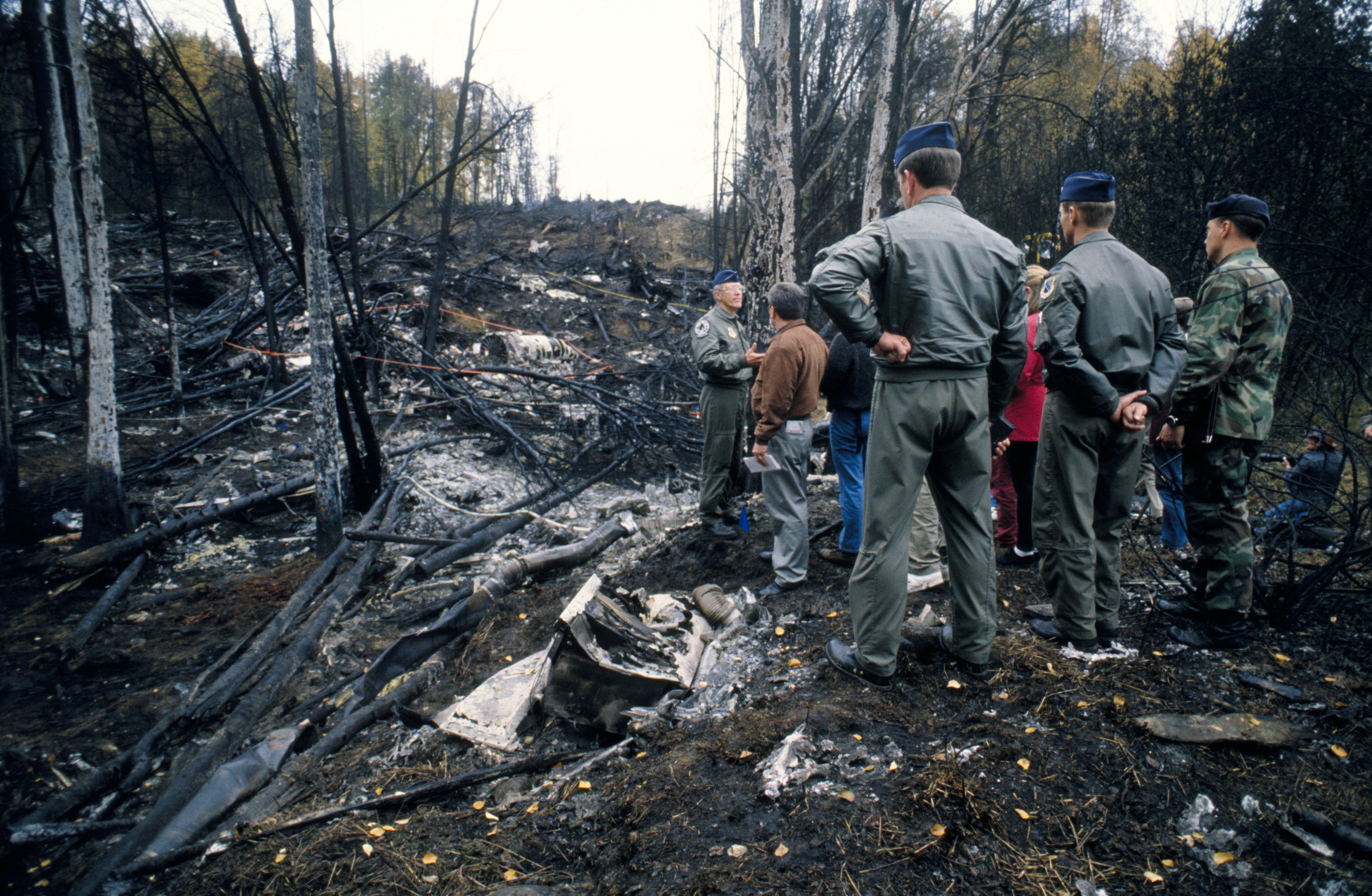
A briefing at the accident site

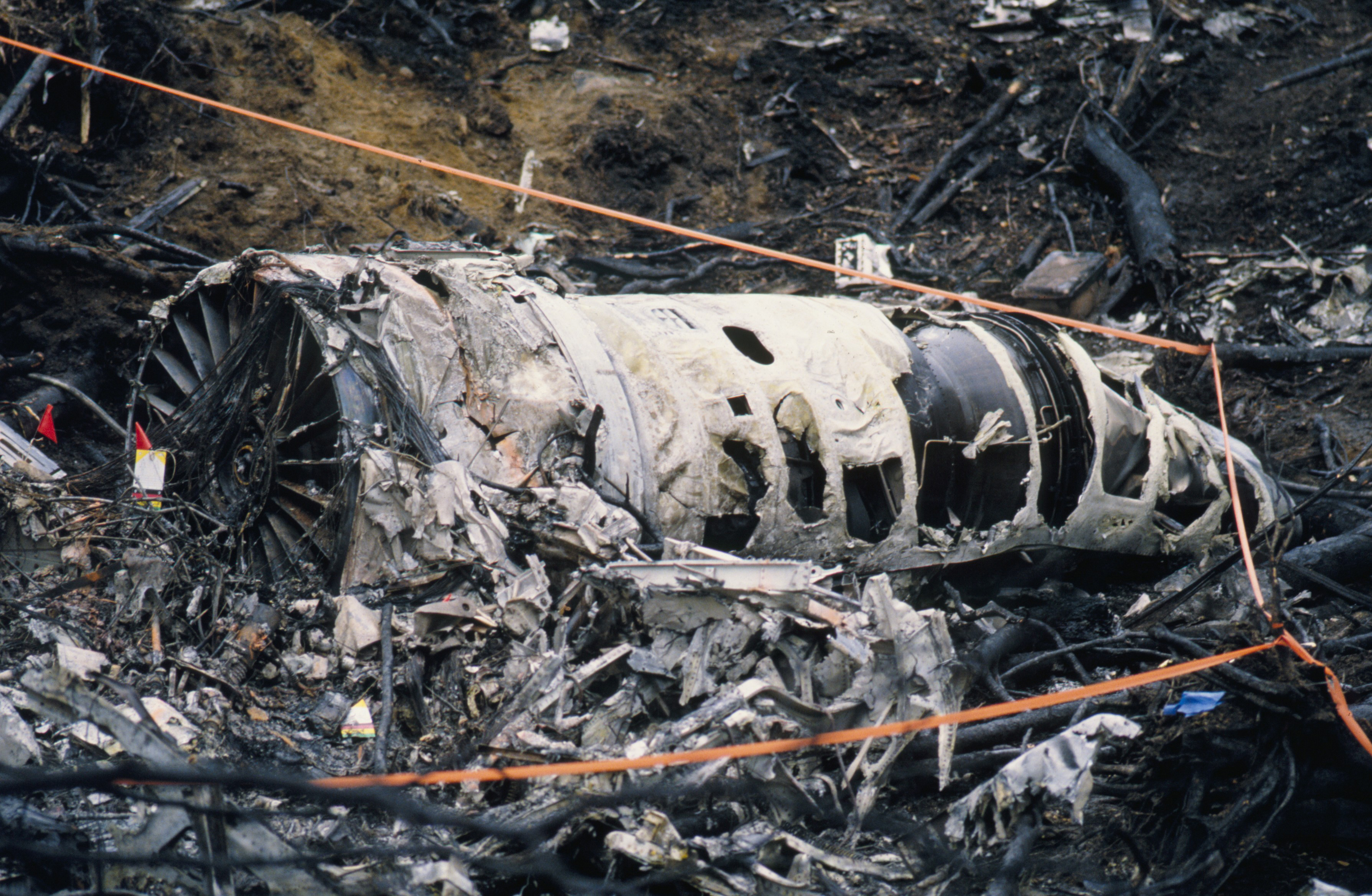
One of the engines at the crash site

The Sentry was being operated by the 962d Airborne Air Control Squadron and was scheduled for a training sortie with the callsign Yukla 27. The aircraft was to depart from runway 06 and was waiting while a C-130 Hercules transport aircraft took off ahead of it. With its crew unaware that the Hercules had disturbed a flock of Canada geese, the Sentry lined up and started its departure roll. As the E-3 rotated, it ingested a number of birds into its number 1 and 2 engines. The crew started to dump fuel and initiated a turn to the left to return to the airfield, but with a full fuel load and having lost two engines on the same wing, it was unable to maintain altitude. After the aircraft reached 250 feet it descended, and after only 42 seconds of flight, it crashed into a hilly, wooded area and exploded.

== Investigation ==
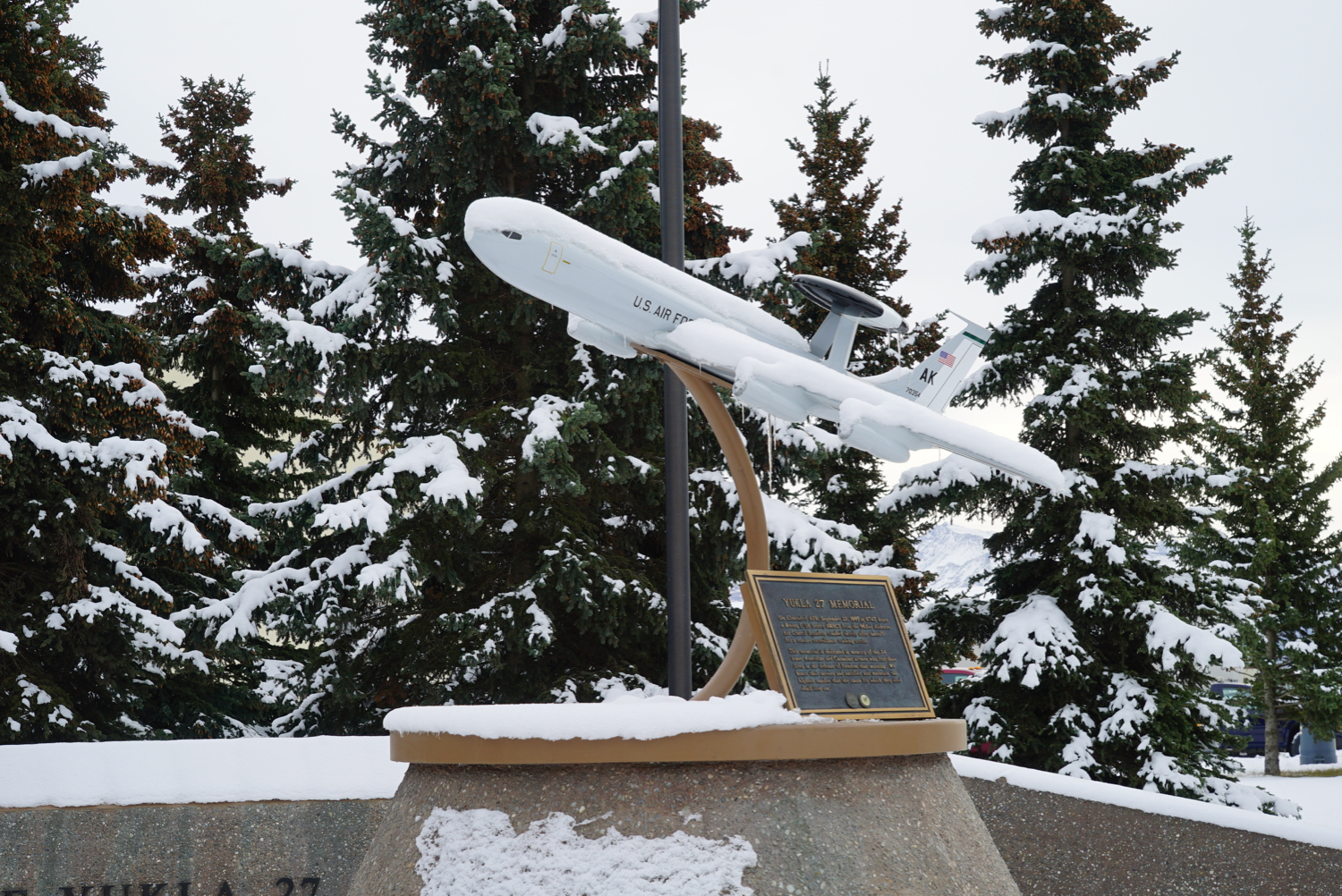
Yukla 27 Memorial at Joint Base Elmendorf-Richardson

The investigation concluded that the probable cause was the ingestion of Canada geese into the number 1 and 2 engines. Other factors included the insufficient efforts of the air base to deter the birds, and the failure of the air traffic control tower to report to both the Sentry and the airfield management that birds were present on the airfield.

The sequence of events during impact was also determined. The aircraft struck the ground nose first and slid to the top of a hill, where the empennage (tail section) broke off. "As the [aircraft] cleared the second hill, it rolled over. The fuselage broke up as the [aircraft] rolled. The outboard right wing impacted on the left side of the wreckage, the right-hand wing broke off and the rotodome section impacted on its back, breaking up the rest of the aircraft."

Investigators reviewed the flight and wreckage path of the accident aircraft. "The [aircraft] lifted off and flew approximately [1.28 kilometers (0.8 mile)] before contacting trees," the report said. "The [aircraft] then flew approximately [0.72 kilometers (0.45 mile)] before making contact with the ground and crashing in a fireball."

== Aircraft ==
The Boeing E-3 Sentry serial number 77-0354 was built as an E-3A variant with the Boeing construction number 21554 and line number 933. It first flew on July 5, 1978 and was delivered to the United States Air Force on January 19, 1979. It was later modified by Boeing to E-3B standard.

This aircraft was used on the first day of the Desert Storm air war, with its crew controlling the intercept and shootdown of four Iraqi fighter aircraft in far western Iraq.

== See also ==
- 2010 Alaska USAF C-17 crash, a 2010 accident that also took place at Elmendorf AFB, crashing a mere 700–800 feet (210–240 m) away from where the E-3 had crashed 15 years prior.
