= Joint base =

United States Armed Forces base utilized by multiple services

A joint base (JB) is a base of the armed forces of the United States utilized by multiple military services; one service hosts one or more other services as tenants on the base. In most cases, joint bases have interservice support agreements (ISSAs) to govern how the host provides services to the tenants.

The practice originated during Base Realignment and Closure (BRAC), 1993, in which joint reserve bases were established at Willow Grove, Pennsylvania, and Fort Worth, Texas. Base Realignment and Closure, 2005 added to this list when 26 bases were combined into twelve and renamed as joint bases. In addition, several other uses of the term "joint" are used in names of some United States military bases are described below.

== BRAC 1993 joint reserve bases ==
JRBs at Willow Grove, Pennsylvania, and Fort Worth, Texas, were created during BRAC 1993; however, the name Joint Reserve Base was not used in the BRAC law. Instead, the BRAC realigned several reserve air assets to Carswell AFB (now NAS JRB Fort Worth) and NAS Willow Grove. It is not clear how or when these bases acquired the Joint Reserve Base name.

The JRBs are examples of typical military host–tenant relationships, in which support provided to the tenants by the host is codified in an ISSA as dictated by DOD Policy. At NAS JRB Fort Worth, the Navy hosts a variety of reserve flying units from the Navy, Marine Corps, and Air Force; each has an ISSA with the Navy for the support it needs at the base.

== BRAC 2005 joint bases ==
The joint basing program, established by recommendation 146 of the 2005 Base Closure and Realignment Commission, represents the department's efforts to optimize the delivery of installation support across the services. The BRAC Report created 12 joint bases from 26 service installations that were in close proximity or shared a boundary. As of 1 October 2010, all 12 joint bases achieved full operational capability.

=== Supporting and supported component agreements ===
Joint basing is not governed by the standard host–tenant ISSA policy, DODI 4000.19. Joint basing is instead governed by a memorandum of agreement between each joint base's supporting component, which provides installation support, and supported components, which receive installation support. BRAC 2005 law identified the supported component by requiring that its base realign the "relocating the installation management functions to" the supporting component.

Guidance developed by the OSD in 2008 required that the supporting and supported components complete a memorandum of agreement defining the installation support relationship between them for forming the joint base and to fully implement the BRAC 2005 joint basing decisions, and that the supporting component deliver installation support in accordance with the new definitions and standards. Resources then were transferred from the supported component(s) to the supporting component in the fiscal year 2010 President's Budget submittal to align resources with responsibility for installation support at the joint bases.

=== Joint base common output level standards (JB-COLS) ===
The joint basing program represents Department of Defense (DoD) efforts to optimize the delivery of installation support across the services. The DoD developed joint base common output level standards (JB-COLS) to provide common output or performance level standards for installation support. The framework of JB-COLS provides a common language to serve as a basis for (1) developing common output levels for each function of installation support at joint bases and (2) developing service-wide capability-based planning models for all installation support functions.

OSD's 2008 guidance on implementing joint basing established a set of installation support functional areas and provided for the creation of a set of joint base common standards to define the level of service expected at each joint base and to ensure consistent delivery of installation support services. As of March 2014, there are 260 joint base common standards grouped into 48 functional areas and 12 categories.

=== List of joint bases ===
Not all of the joint bases were mandated by BRAC 2005 law to establish themselves as joint bases; however, all 12 joint bases assumed that nomenclature or a variation.

1. Joint Base Anacostia–Bolling (US Air Force–controlled^{a}) – consolidation of Naval Support Facility Anacostia and Bolling Air Force Base in the District of Columbia
2. Joint Base Andrews (US Air Force–controlled) – consolidation of Andrews Air Force Base and Naval Air Facility Washington in Maryland
3. Joint Base Charleston (US Air Force–controlled) – consolidation of Charleston Air Force Base and Naval Weapons Station Charleston in South Carolina
4. Joint Base Elmendorf–Richardson (US Air Force–controlled) – consolidation of Elmendorf Air Force Base and Fort Richardson in Alaska
5. Joint Base Langley–Eustis (US Air Force–controlled) – consolidation of Langley Air Force Base and Fort Eustis in Virginia
6. Joint Base Lewis–McChord (US Army–controlled) – consolidation of Fort Lewis and McChord Air Force Base in Washington
7. Joint Base McGuire–Dix–Lakehurst (US Air Force–controlled) – consolidation of McGuire Air Force Base, Fort Dix, and Naval Air Engineering Station Lakehurst in New Jersey
8. Joint Base Myer–Henderson Hall (US Army–controlled) – consolidation of Fort Myer and Henderson Hall (USMC) in Virginia, as well as Fort Lesley J. McNair in Washington, D.C.
9. Joint Base Pearl Harbor–Hickam (US Navy–controlled) – consolidation of Naval Station Pearl Harbor and Hickam Air Force Base in Hawaii
10. Joint Base San Antonio (US Air Force–controlled) – consolidation of Randolph Air Force Base, Lackland Air Force Base, Kelly Field Annex, and Fort Sam Houston in Texas
11. Joint Expeditionary Base Little Creek–Fort Story (US Navy–controlled) – consolidation of Naval Amphibious Base Little Creek and Fort Story in Virginia
12. Joint Region Marianas (US Navy–controlled) – consolidation of Andersen Air Force Base and Naval Base Guam

== Joint Base Balad ==
In addition to the above bases, Joint Base Balad was created as part of a combination of bases in Iraq. It was handed over to the Iraqi Air Force in 2011, as the United States military withdrew from the nation. Joint Base Balad operated under the direction of CENTCOM. Two authorities provided support to tenants: the base operations support integrator (BOS-I) and the senior airfield authority (SAA). The U.S. Air Force was the host at Joint Base Balad serving as both the BOS-I and SAA. No host-tenant agreement with the Army or other tenants of Joint Base Balad were needed, as it was CENTCOM policy for the BOS-I and SAA to advocate on behalf of all tenants.

== Joint Base Cape Cod ==
Although not officially named by the United States Department of Defense, local leaders on Cape Cod, and the Commonwealth of Massachusetts renamed the Massachusetts Military Reservation to Joint Base Cape Cod in 2013, reflecting its many operational tenants.

== Notes ==
A.^a Joint Base Anacostia–Bolling was Navy-controlled from establishment in 2010 until it was transferred to the Air Force on October 1, 2020.
