= 2005 Base Realignment and Closure Commission =

2005 United States military commission

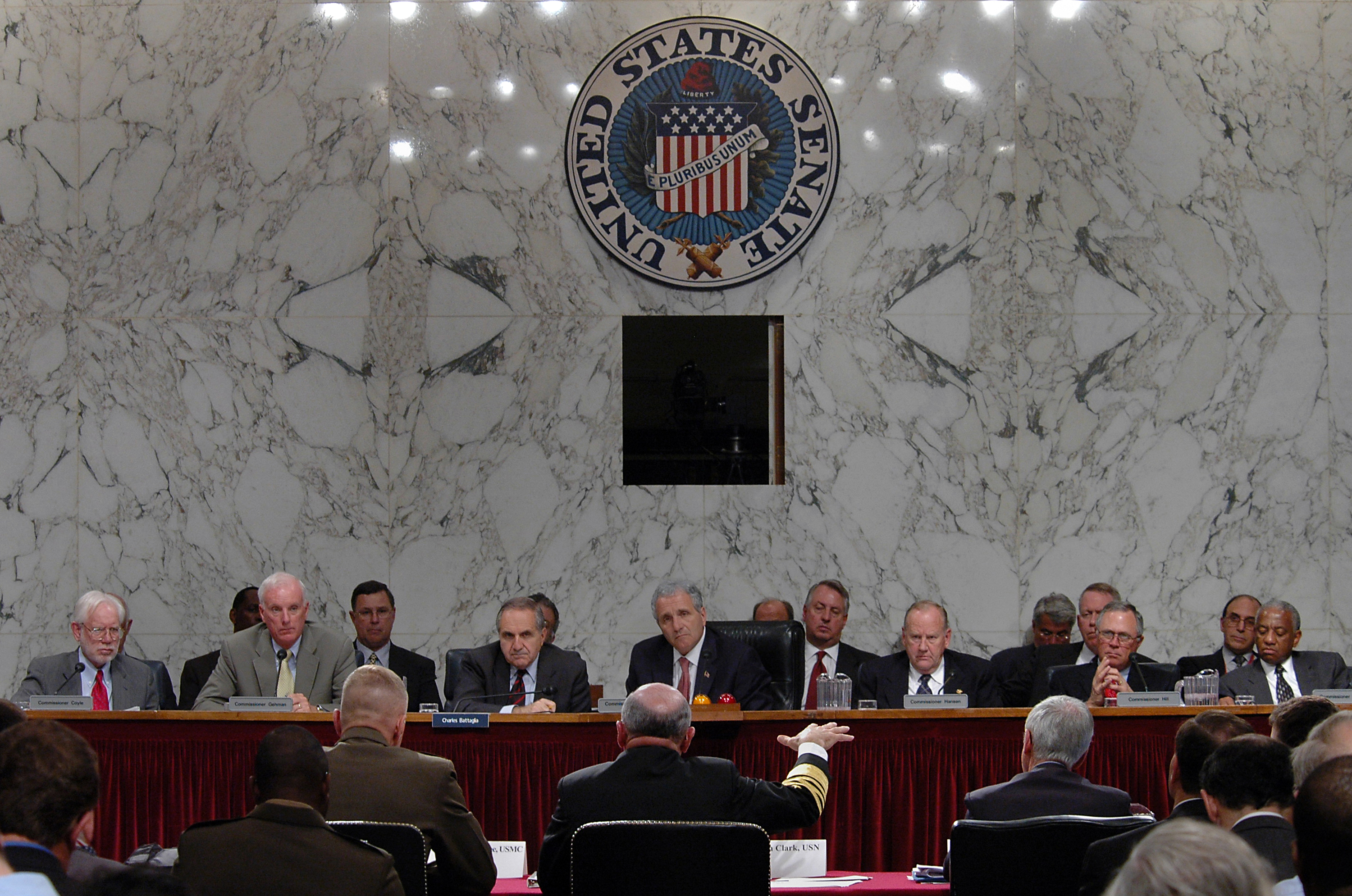
The Commission questions Gordon R. England, Vern Clark, and Michael Hagee in 2005.

The 2005 Base Realignment and Closure Commission preliminary list was released by the United States Department of Defense on May 13, 2005. It was the fifth Base Realignment and Closure ("BRAC") proposal generated since the process was created in 1988. It recommended closing 22 major United States military bases and the "realignment" (either enlarging or shrinking) of 33 others. On September 15, 2005, President George W. Bush approved the BRAC Commission's recommendations, leaving the fate of the bases in question to the United States Congress. Congress had a maximum of 45 days to reject the proposal by passing a joint resolution of disapproval, or the recommendations automatically enter into effect. Such a resolution (H.J.Res. 65) was introduced to the House of Representatives on September 23, 2005, by Rep. Ray LaHood (R-IL) (no such resolution was introduced in the Senate). The House took up debate of the resolution on October 26, 2005. The resolution failed to pass by a 324–85 margin, thereby enacting the list of recommendations. The secretary of defense was required to begin implementing the recommendations by September 15, 2007, and to complete implementation no later than September 15, 2011.

== Commissioners ==
- Anthony Principi, Chairman
- James H. Bilbray
- Philip Coyle
- Harold W. Gehman, Jr.
- James V. Hansen
- James T. Hill
- Lloyd W. Newton
- Samuel K. Skinner
- Sue E. Turner

== Justifications ==
Pentagon officials calculated that, if adopted in full by the nine-member BRAC Commission, the recommendations would have saved almost $50 billion over 20 years. The BRAC Commission (officially known as the Defense Base Closure and Realignment Commission) disputed this claim, pointing out what it considered to be significant flaws in the Department's methodology. The Commission recalculated the 20-year savings of the DOD recommendation list at just above $37 billion. Between late May and late August, the Commission reviewed the list and amended many of the Pentagon's recommendations, removing several major installations from the closure list. The Commission calculated the overall 20-year savings to the government in carrying out its amended list of recommendations as close to $15 billion.

On May 12, 2005, Gen. Richard Myers, Chairman of the Joint Chiefs of Staff, said that the two-year effort to produce the list had several objectives:

- better integrate active and reserve units
- rearrange forces to be able to act around the globe
- make the military more flexible and agile
- improve cooperation between military service branches while training and fighting
- convert unneeded capacity into warfighting capability

The 2005 BRAC round was the fifth since the process was initiated in 1988, and the first since 1995. It differed significantly from preceding rounds in several respects:

- It was the first with a nine-member commission (the 1991, 1993, and 1995 commissions had eight members)
- It was the only stand-alone round authorized by Congress (the 1988 BRAC round was initiated by the Secretary of Defense, and the 1991–1995 rounds were authorized together in the Defense Base Closure and Realignment Act of 1990)
- It was the first BRAC round focused on military force transformation, not infrastructure reduction
- It was the only round as part of a worldwide defense infrastructure review including U.S. installations overseas
- It was the first BRAC to impact the National Guard such that, several states filed legal proceedings to stay or have recommendations thrown out

== Recommendations ==
Major facilities slated for closure included these:

- Fort McPherson, Georgia
- Fort Gillem, Georgia
- Naval Submarine Base New London in Connecticut (removed from list August 24, 2005)
- Portsmouth Naval Shipyard in Kittery, Maine (removed from list August 26, 2005)
- Naval Air Station Brunswick in Maine
- Ellsworth Air Force Base in South Dakota (removed from list August 26, 2005)
- Cannon Air Force Base in New Mexico (temporarily removed from closure August 26, 2005, pending review of new mission assignment; permanently removed from closure list following review and transferred to Air Force Special Operations Command)
- Fort Monmouth in New Jersey
- Defense Finance and Accounting Service in New York
- Fort Monroe, Virginia
- Brooks Air Force Base, Texas
- Naval Air Station Joint Reserve Base Willow Grove in Pennsylvania (portion retained as a non-flying Pennsylvania Air National Guard facility)
- Naval Station Ingleside, Texas
- Otis Air National Guard Base, Massachusetts (removed from list August 26, 2005)
- Navy Supply Corps School (Athens, Georgia), relocated to Naval Station Newport, Rhode Island in 2011.

Major facilities slated for realignment included these:

- Army Human Resource Command (HRC) in Missouri, moving to Fort Knox, Kentucky.
- United States Army Armor School in Fort Knox, Kentucky, moving to the Maneuver Center of Excellence in Fort Benning, Georgia.
- United States Army Air Defense Artillery School in Fort Bliss, Texas, moving to Fort Sill in Lawton, Oklahoma.
- Walter Reed Army Medical Center in Washington, D.C.
- Naval Station Great Lakes in Illinois
- Naval Air Station Oceana in Virginia (extent contingent on reopening the former Naval Air Station Cecil Field in Florida)
- Grand Forks Air Force Base in North Dakota
- Fort Richardson and Elmendorf Air Force Base in Alaska merged to Joint Base Elmendorf–Richardson
- Rome Laboratory in New York
- Wright Patterson Air Force Base in Ohio
- Brooke Army Medical Center in Texas was renamed San Antonio Military Medical Center
- Wilford Hall Medical Center in Texas was renamed Wilford Hall Ambulatory Surgical Center
- Naval Air Weapons Station China Lake in California
- Pope Air Force Base in North Carolina

By merging adjacent installations belonging to different services, 13 Joint Bases were created.

== Results ==
The 2005 Base Realignment and Closure Commission resulted in a $35 billion increase in military spending, partly due to building new facilities. The military claimed, however, that it also resulted in a $4 billion reduction in annual spending.

== See also ==
- Loss of Strength Gradient
