= Joint Base Elmendorf–Richardson =

US military installation in Anchorage, Alaska

Joint Base Elmendorf-Richardson
- Anchorage, Alaska in United States
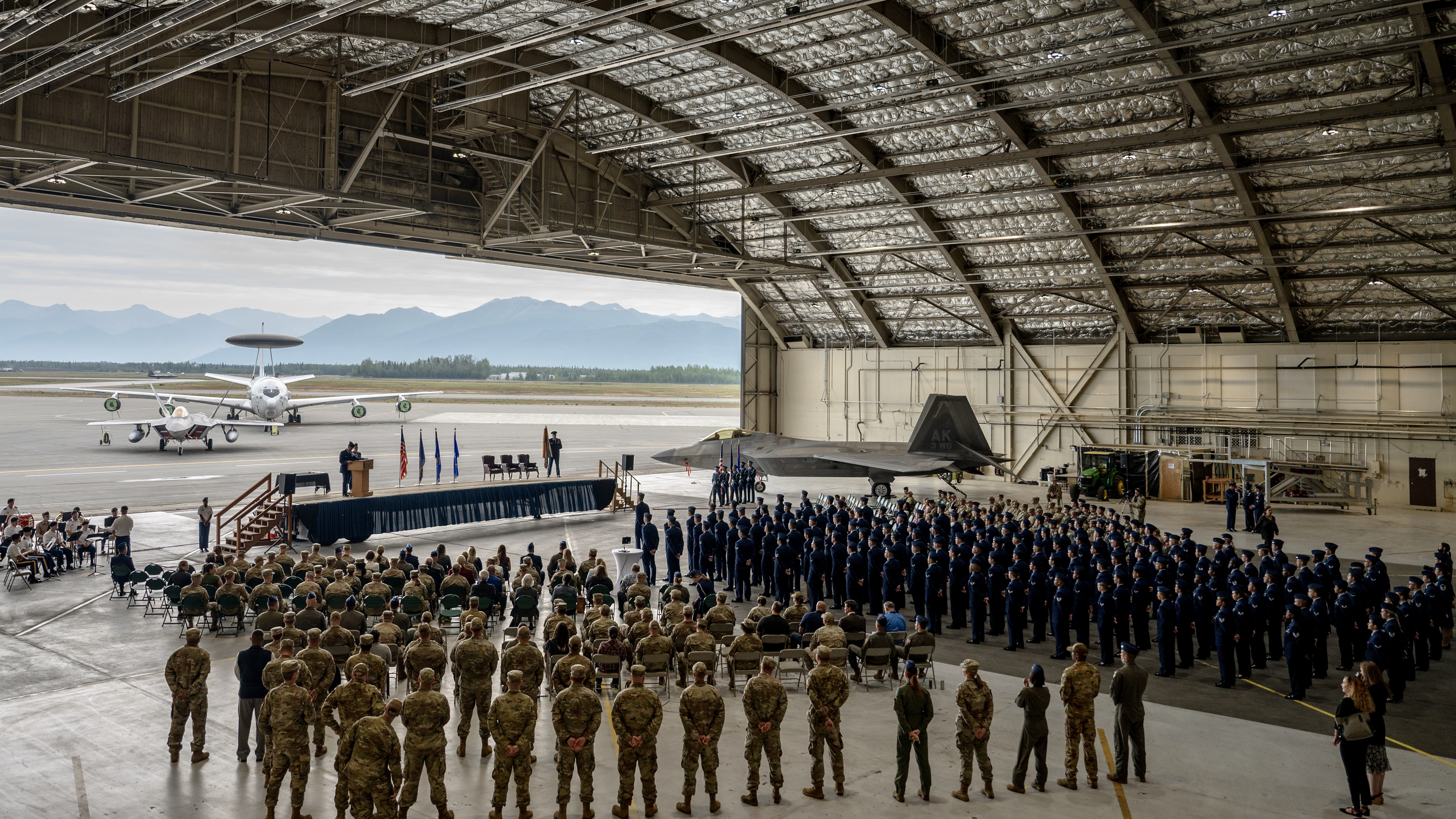
- 3rd Wing Change of Command - July 2022

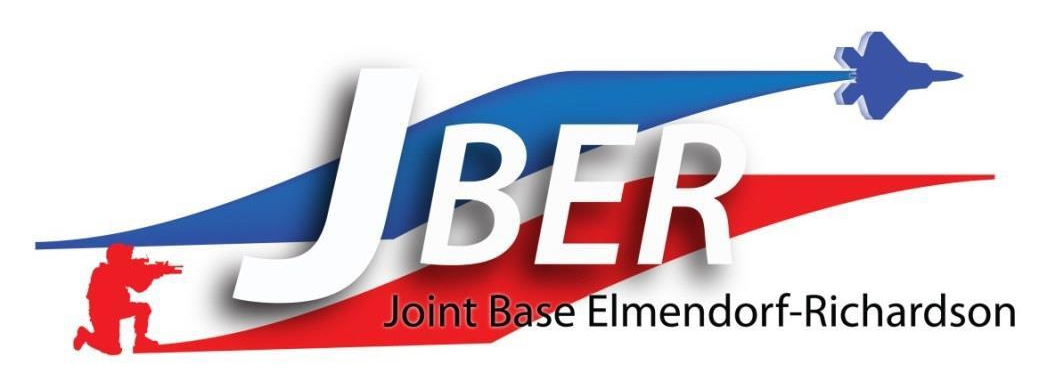

Site information
- Type: US military Joint Base
- Owner: Department of Defense
- Operator: US Air Force
- Controlled by: Pacific Air Forces (PACAF)
- Condition: Operational
- Website: www.jber.jb.mil

Location
- Location in Alaska
- Coordinates: 61°15′05″N 149°48′23″W
- Area: 25,899 hectares (64,000 acres)

Site history
- Built: 1940 (as Elmendorf Field and Fort Richardson)
- In use: 2010 (as Joint Base)

Garrison information
- Garrison: 673rd Air Base Wing (Host)

Airfield information
- Identifiers: IATA: EDF, ICAO: PAED, FAA LID: EDF, WMO: 702720
- Elevation: 64.9 metres (213 ft) AMSL
Runways
Direction	Length and surface
06/24	3,048 metres (10,000 ft) Asphalt
16/34	2,283.8 metres (7,493 ft) Asphalt

Joint Base Elmendorf–Richardson (IATA: EDF, ICAO: PAED, FAA LID: EDF) is a United States military facility in Anchorage, Alaska. It is a joint base formed from the United States Air Force's Elmendorf Air Force Base and the United States Army's Fort Richardson, which were merged in 2010.

The adjacent facilities were officially combined by the 2005 Base Closure and Realignment Commission. Its mission is to support and defend U.S. interests in the Asia Pacific region and around the world by providing units who are ready for worldwide air power projection and a base that is capable of meeting USINDOPACOM's theater staging and throughput requirements.

It is the home of the Headquarters, Alaskan Command (ALCOM), Alaskan NORAD Region (ANR), Joint Task Force-Alaska (JTF-AK), the 11th Airborne Division, Eleventh Air Force (11 AF), the 673d Air Base Wing, the 3rd Wing, the 176th Wing and other Tenant Units.

The site gained notability in 2025, when it was announced that Russian president Vladimir Putin would meet United States president Donald Trump at the base for a summit, with the main topic being the Russo-Ukrainian war.

== History ==
Joint Base Elmendorf–Richardson (JBER) is one of 12 Joint Bases that were created in 2010 in accordance with the Base Realignment and Closure Commission's BRAC 2005 round. It was merged from Elmendorf Air Force Base and Fort Richardson.

The 2025 Russia–United States Summit, a summit meeting between United States president Donald Trump and Russian president Vladimir Putin, was held on August 15, 2025, at the base.

== Units ==
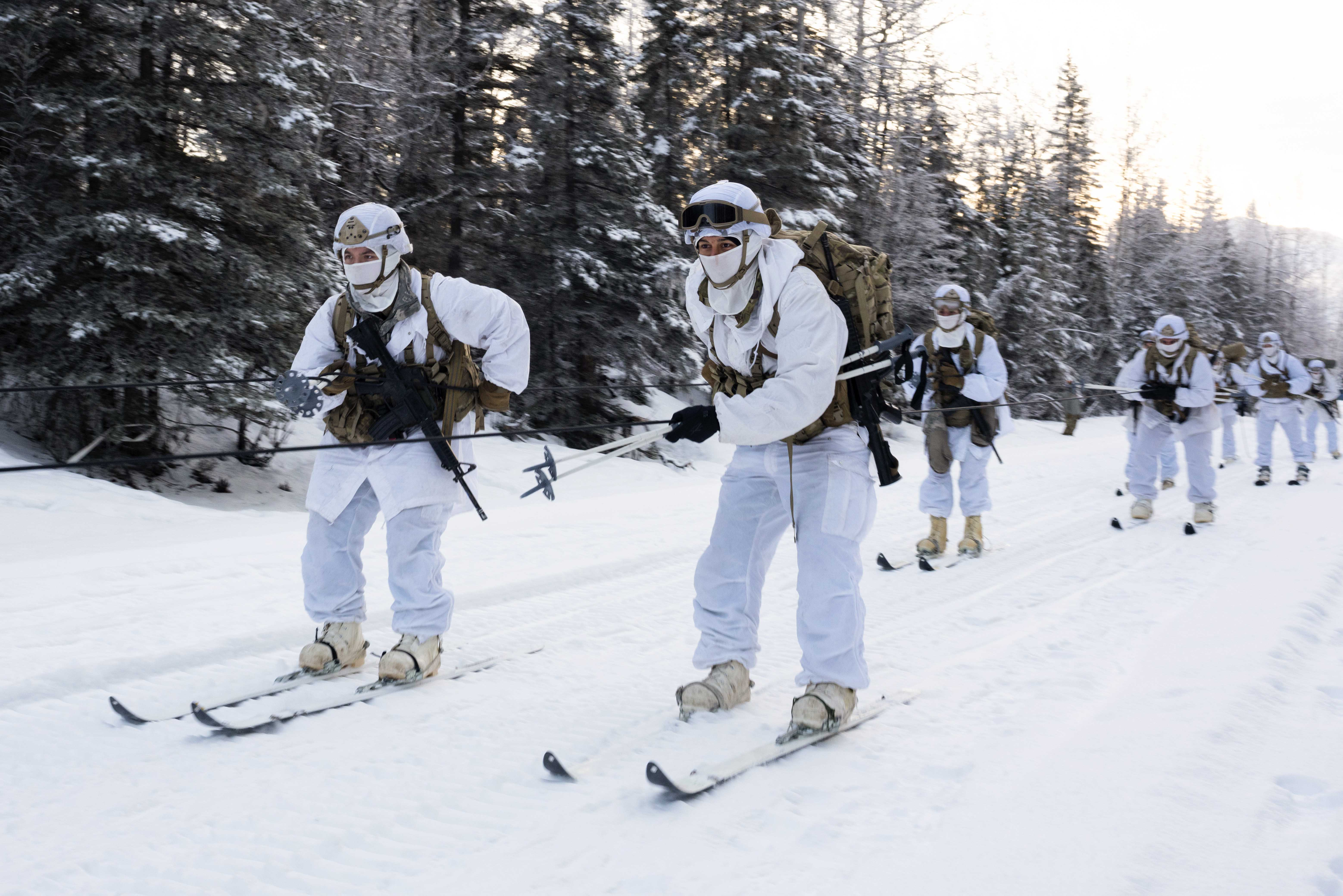
Paratroopers participate in a skijoring training exercise at the base in 2021.

The 673d ABW consists of four groups that operate and maintain the joint base for air sovereignty, combat training, force staging and throughput operations in support of worldwide contingencies.

The installation hosts the headquarters for the United States Alaskan Command, 11th Air Force, 11th Airborne Division, and the Alaskan North American Aerospace Defense Command Region.

Major units assigned are:

- 673d Air Base Wing

Activated on 30 July 2010 as the host wing combining installation management functions of Elmendorf AFB's 3rd Wing and U.S. Army Garrison Fort Richardson. The 673d ABW comprises over 5,500 joint military and civilian personnel, supporting America's Arctic Warriors and their families. The wing supports and enables three AF total-force wings, two Army Brigades and 55 other tenant units. In addition, the wing provides medical care to over 35,000 joint service members, dependents, VA patients and retirees throughout Alaska. The 673d ABW maintains an $11.4B infrastructure encompassing 25,899 hectares (64,000 acres).

- Alaskan Command

Responsible for maximizing theater force readiness for 21,000 Alaskan service members and expediting worldwide contingency force deployments from and through Alaska as directed by the Commander, NORTHCOM.

- 11th Airborne Division HQ

11th Airborne Division executes continuous training and readiness oversight responsibilities for Army Force Generation in Alaska. Supports U.S. Pacific Command Theater Security Cooperation Program. On order, executes Joint Force Land Component Command functions in support of Homeland Defense and Security in Alaska.

- 2nd Infantry Brigade Combat Team (Airborne), 11th Airborne Division

On order, 2/11 IBCT(ABN) conducts decisive action, to include joint forcible entry, as an Army Contingency Response Force (CRF) aligned with PACOM in order to promote security and peaceful development in the Asia-Pacific region.

- 3rd Wing (USAF)

To support and defend US interests in the Asia Pacific region and around the world by providing units who are ready for worldwide air power projection and a base that is capable of meeting PACOM's theater staging and throughput requirements.

- Alaskan Norad Region

The Alaskan NORAD Region (ANR) conducts aerospace control within its area of operations and contributes to NORAD's aerospace warning mission.

- Eleventh Air Force

Provide ready warriors and infrastructure for homeland defense, decisive force projection, and aerospace command and control.

=== Major Commands to which assigned ===
- Pacific Air Forces, (2010 – present)

=== Base operating units ===
- 673d Air Base Wing (July 2010 – present)

=== Major units assigned ===
- 381st Intelligence Squadron (2010–present)
  (6981st with various unit designations under USAFSS)
- 3rd Wing (2010 – present)
- 176th Wing (2011–present) The 176th Wing (AK ANG) moved from the former Kulis Air National Guard Base to JBER in 2011. Its new facilities, an area north of the flightline, were unofficially but widely nicknamed 'Camp Kulis'. The area includes a headquarters building, pararescue facility, and several other installations used by the 176th Wing.

== Notable aviation accidents ==
On July 28, 2010, a Boeing C-17 Globemaster III cargo aircraft practicing for an upcoming airshow crashed into a wooded area within the base, killing all four aircrew members; three from the Alaska Air National Guard and one from the USAF. The cause of the accident has been reported to be pilot error. The pilot performed an aggressive righthand turn and ignored the aircraft's stall warning, continuing the turn until the aircraft stalled due to lack of airspeed. The low altitude of the turn made it impossible for the crew to recover from the stall in time to avoid impacting the ground. The C-17 crashed just 91 metres (100 yd) from the site of the 1995 E-3 AWACS crash.

On November 16, 2010, a Lockheed Martin F-22 Raptor took off for a training mission. At approximately 1900 hours, the base reported that the aircraft was overdue and missing. Air Force rescue teams were reported to be concentrating their search for the missing plane and pilot, Captain Jeffrey Haney, in Denali National Park. The F-22's crash site was found about 160 kilometres (99 mi) north of Anchorage near the town of Cantwell, Alaska. The pilot, part of the US Air Force's 525th Fighter Squadron, was killed in the crash.

After the crash, F-22s were restricted to flying below 7,620 metres (25,000 ft), then grounded during the investigation. The crash was attributed to a bleed air system malfunction after an engine overheat condition was detected, shutting down the Environmental Control System (ECS) and OBOGS. The accident review board ruled Haney was to blame, as he did not react properly to engage the emergency oxygen system. Haney's widow sued Lockheed Martin, claiming equipment defects, and later reached a settlement. After the ruling, the emergency oxygen system engagement handle was redesigned; the system was eventually replaced by an automatic backup oxygen system (ABOS). On 11 February 2013, the DoD's Inspector General released a report stating that the USAF had erred in blaming Haney, and that facts did not sufficiently support conclusions; the USAF stated that it stood by the ruling.

== See also ==
- Alaska World War II Army Airfields
- Arctic Thunder Air Show
- United States Pacific Air Forces
