= 2010 United States Air Force Boeing C-17 crash =

2010 plane crash in Alaska, United States

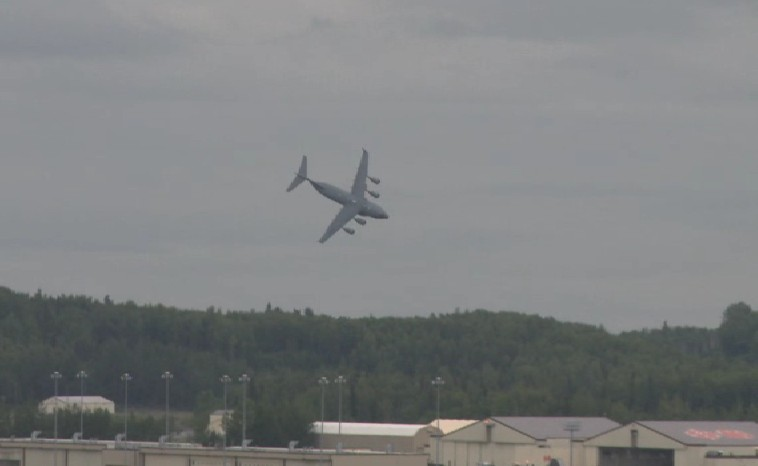
- The C-17 moments before hitting the ground

Accident
- Date: 28 July 2010; 16 years ago
- Summary: Low-altitude stall due to pilot error
- Site: Near Elmendorf Air Force Base, Alaska, United States; 61°15′53″N 149°45′52″W

Aircraft
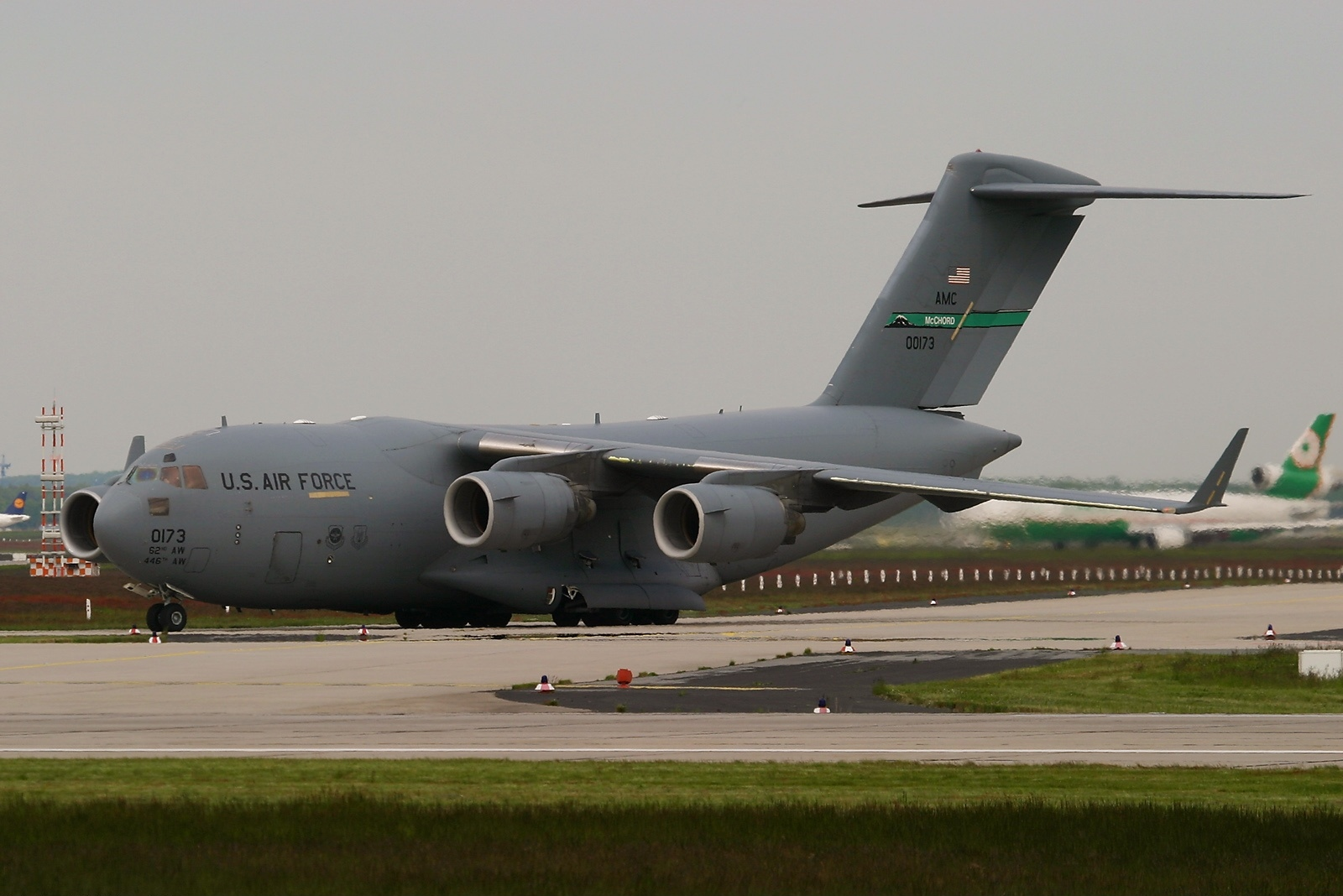
- The incident aircraft at Frankfurt Airport in 2005
- Aircraft type: Boeing C-17 Globemaster III
- Aircraft name: Spirit of the Aleutians
- Operator: United States Air Force
- Registration: 00-0173
- Flight origin: Elmendorf Air Force Base, Alaska, United States
- Destination: Elmendorf Air Force Base, Alaska, United States
- Occupants: 4
- Crew: 4
- Fatalities: 4
- Survivors: 0

On 28 July 2010, a C-17 Globemaster III transport plane of the United States Air Force (USAF) crashed near Elmendorf Air Force Base in Alaska while practicing for a flight display at the upcoming Arctic Thunder Air Show. All four crew members on board were killed. It was the first, and to date only, accident of a C-17 aircraft resulting in one or more fatalities.

The subsequent investigation blamed pilot error for the low-altitude stall that led to the crash.

== Accident ==
Truncated video of the accident flight

On 28 July 2010, a United States Air Force (USAF) crew was conducting a local training flight in preparation for the upcoming Arctic Thunder Air Show, to be held at Elmendorf Air Force Base (Elmendorf AFB) from 31 July to 1 August. The Boeing C-17 Globemaster III is commonly featured in American air shows, highlighting its short takeoff and landing capability. The plane had flown earlier that day with a different crew.

At approximately 6:22 p.m. Alaska Daylight Time (UTC-8), the C-17 took off from Runway 06 at Elmendorf AFB to practice the display routine. After the initial climb, followed by a left turn, the pilot executed a sharp right turn.

As the aircraft banked, the stall warning system activated to alert the crew of an impending stall. Instead of implementing stall recovery procedures, the pilot continued the turn and the aircraft entered a stall from which recovery was not possible. The plane crashed and exploded in a fireball about 2 miles (3 km) from the airfield.

== Background ==
=== Aircraft ===
The aircraft was a four-engined C-17 Globemaster III built by Boeing. It belonged to the 3rd Wing (3 WG) and operated jointly with the 176th Wing (176 WG) at Elmendorf AFB, located near downtown Anchorage. The aircraft had USAF serial number "00-0173" and was named Spirit of the Aleutians.

The U.S. Air Force has 222 C-17s in service with the active Air Force, Air Force Reserve, and Air National Guard (ANG), with the type being based at Elmendorf since June 2007. At the time of the crash, the base had eight of the aircraft, operated jointly by an active duty Air Force organization, the 3rd Wing's 517th Airlift Squadron; and an Alaska Air National Guard (Alaska ANG) unit, the 176th Wing's 249th Airlift Squadron. The mishap was the first fatal crash of a C-17.

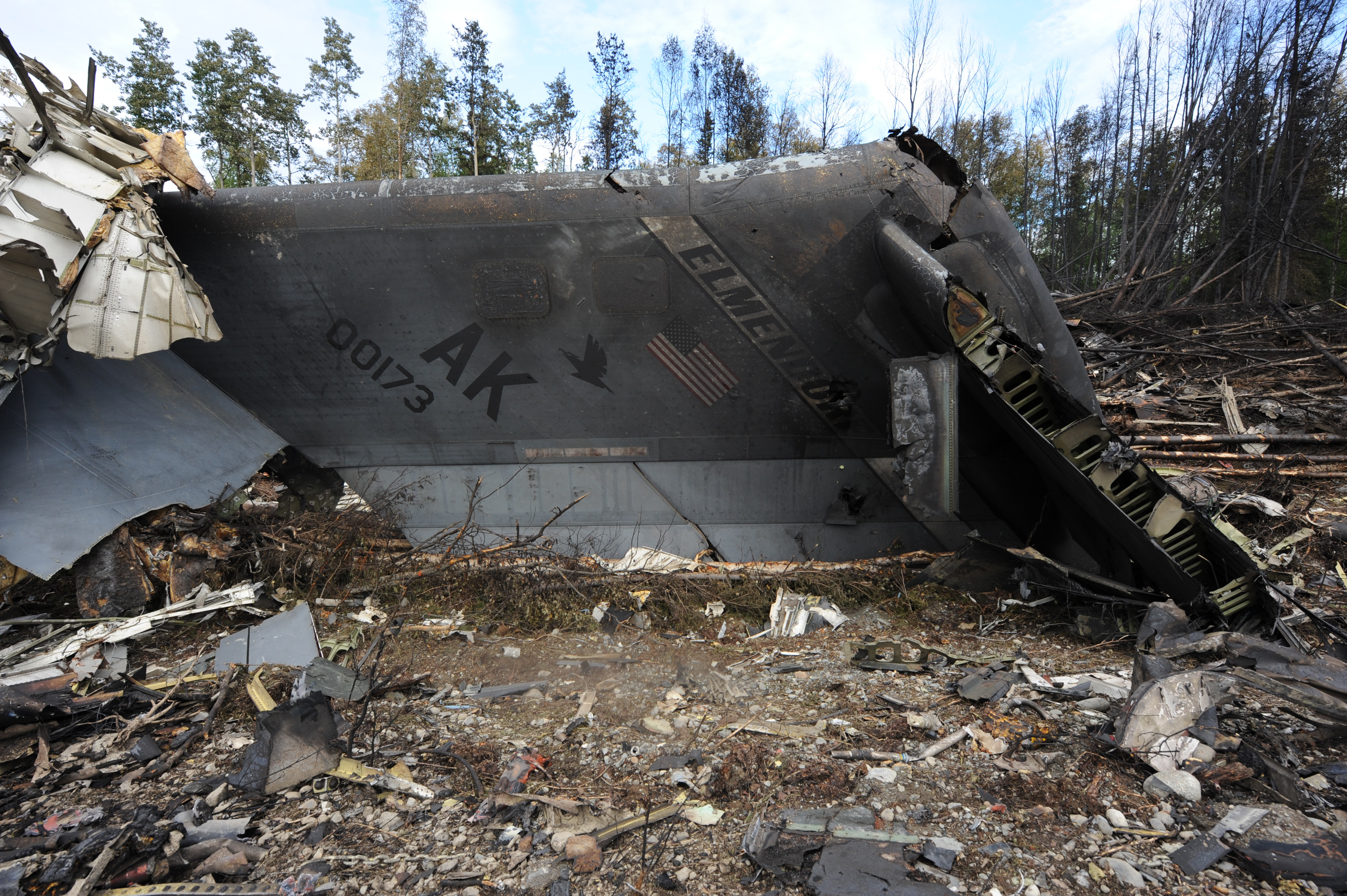
The tail of the crashed C-17 among the wreckage

=== Crew ===
The four crew members on board all died; they were Majors Michael Freyholtz and Aaron Malone, pilots assigned to the Alaska ANG's 249th Airlift Squadron; Captain Jeffrey Hill, a pilot assigned to Elmendorf's active-duty Air Force's 517th Airlift Squadron; and Senior Master Sergeant Thomas E. Cicardo, a loadmaster of the Alaska ANG's 249th Airlift Squadron.

== Aftermath ==
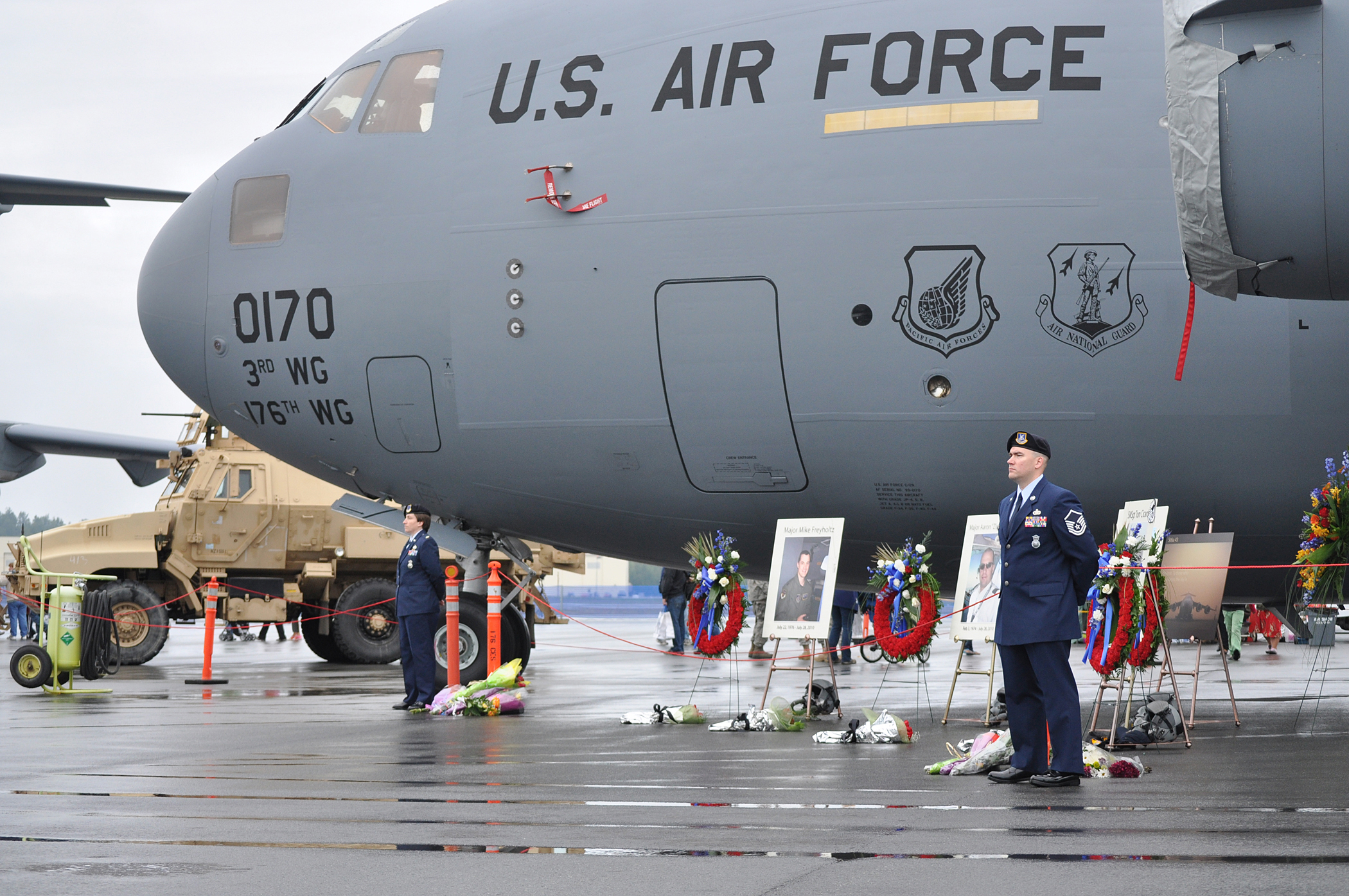
Another C-17 served as a memorial to the lost airmen during the Arctic Thunder Air Show, three days after the crash.

A member of the Anchorage Fire Department described how a fireball rose to around 750 feet (230 m) into the air, an estimated 2 miles (3 km) from Anchorage.

Debris from the crash was spread along 200 feet (60 m) of the Alaska Railroad tracks which carry passenger and freight trains daily through the base area, north to Wasilla, although no trains were scheduled to be passing through at the time of the crash.

Track repairs to the nearby railroad caused freight services to be suspended, and passenger services to be diverted by bus. The air show went ahead as planned as a tribute to the four dead airmen.

== Investigation ==
The investigation report into the crash was released on 13 December 2010. It blamed pilot error, stating that the pilot's overconfidence in executing an aggressive right-turn maneuver led to a low-altitude stall and subsequent crash, despite the warnings correctly provided by the aircraft's stall-warning system, to which neither the pilot nor any other crew member responded effectively.

The accident displayed significant similarities with the 1994 crash of a B-52 bomber at Fairchild Air Force Base near Spokane, Washington.

On both occasions, the local USAF unit's chain of command apparently failed to prevent the pilots involved from developing deliberately unsafe flying practices for aerial displays of large aircraft.

The USAF's accident report

== See also ==
- 1995 Alaska Boeing E-3 Sentry accident
- List of airshow accidents and incidents
