= Arctic Thunder Air Show =

Airshow in Alaska

Arctic Thunder
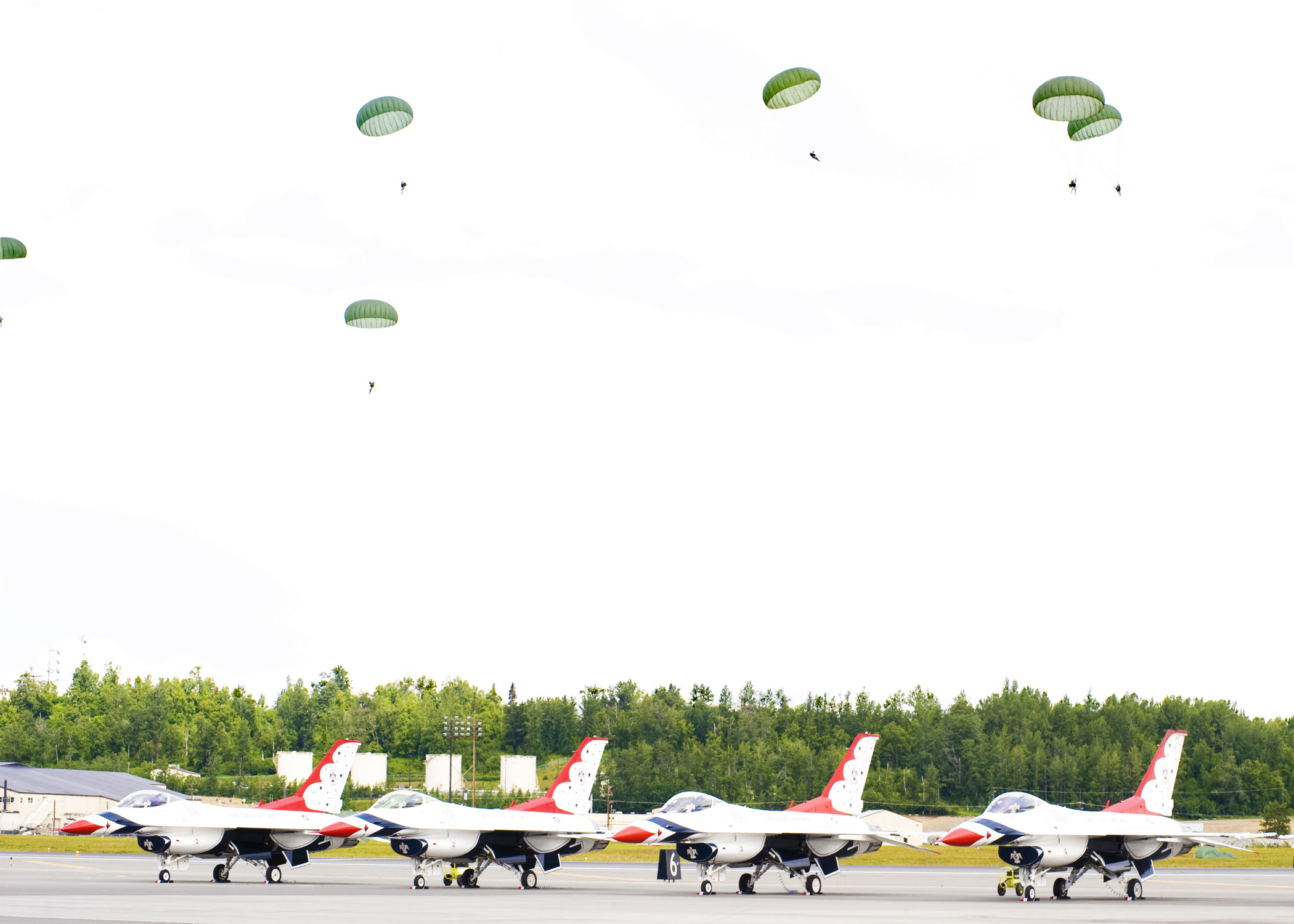
- Army paratroopers land adjacent to the F-16 fighters of the Thunderbirds as part of the Alaska Joint Forces demonstration.
- Genre: Air show
- Frequency: Biennial
- Venue: Joint Base Elmendorf-Richardson
- Location: Anchorage, Alaska
- Coordinates: 61°15′03″N 149°48′18″W
- Country: United States
- Established: 1990
- Attendance: 100,000
- Major events: Air show
- Organizer: United States Air Force
- Website: ArcticThunderOpenHouse.com

The Arctic Thunder Air Show is an air show and open house event held biennially at Joint Base Elmendorf-Richardson, Anchorage, Alaska, since 1990. It is a free event open to the general public, and one of the largest public events in Alaska. The 2010 show was marred by a tragedy due to a C-17 transport plane crash a few days before the event, but it still managed to attract an estimated attendance of at least 100,000. In addition to performances by military teams such as the Thunderbirds and the Blue Angels, the show also features appearances by civilian aerial performers.
