= 381st Intelligence Squadron =

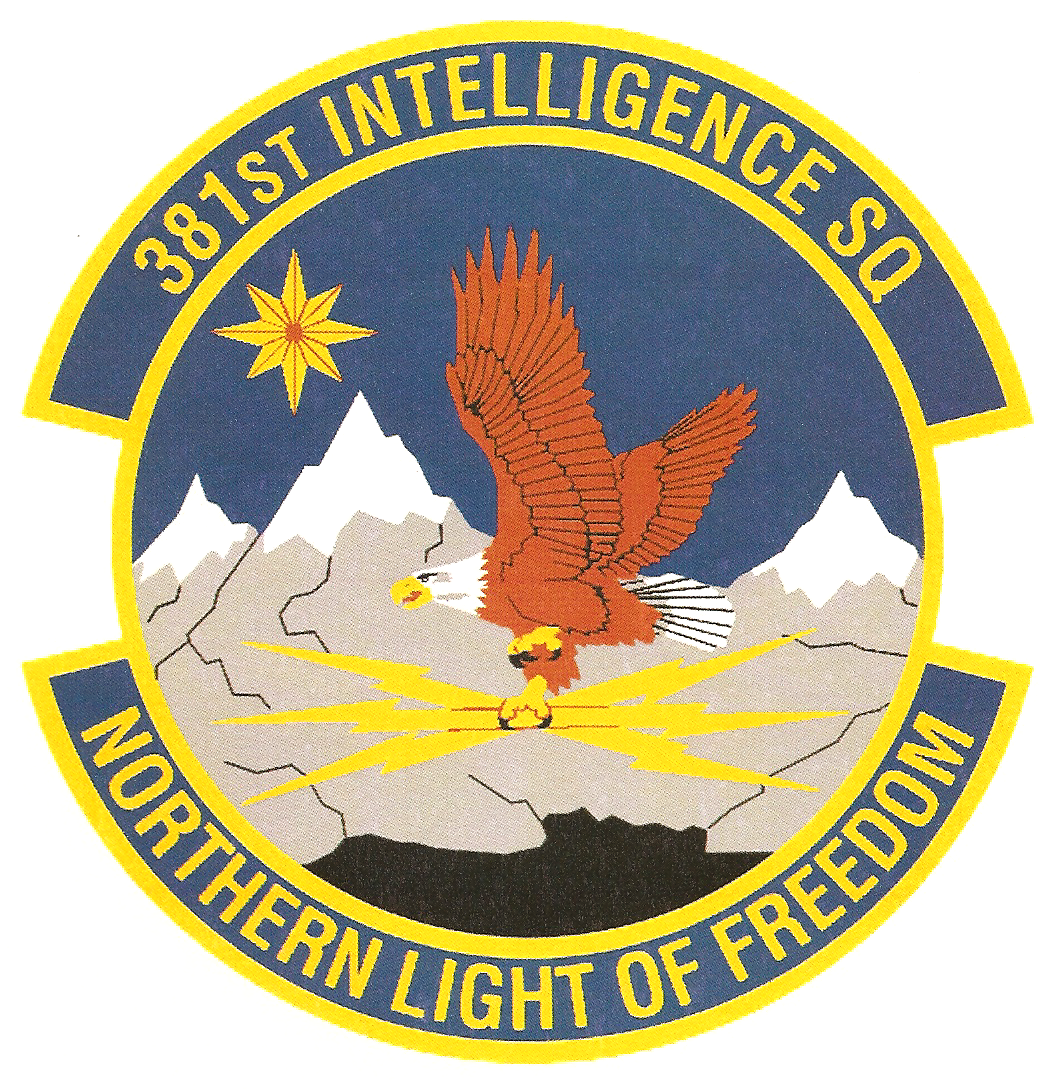
- Squadron emblem
- Active: 1942–1945; 1946–1949; 1949–1955; 1955 – present
- Country: United States
- Branch: United States Air Force
- Type: Squadron
- Role: Intelligence operations
- Part of: 373rd Intelligence, Surveillance and Reconnaissance Group
- Base: Joint Base Elmendorf-Richardson, Alaska
- Motto: Northern light of freedom

The United States Air Force's 381st Intelligence Squadron is an intelligence unit located at Joint Base Elmendorf-Richardson, Alaska. The unit operated the last operational AN/FLR-9 Circularly Disposed Antenna Array (CDAA), also known as an "Elephant Cage", until 25 May 2016.

== History ==
=== Emblem significance ===
Blue and yellow are the Air Force colors. Blue alludes to the sky, the primary theater of Air Force operations. Yellow refers to the sun and the excellence required of Air Force personnel.

== Previous designations ==
- 381st Intelligence Squadron (1 October 1993 – present)
- 6981st Electronic Security Group (1 April 1989 – 1 October 1993)
- 6981st Electronic Security Squadron (1 August 1979 – 1 April 1989)
- 6981st Security Squadron (1 July 1974 – 1 August 1979)
- 6981st Security Group (1 July 1963 – 1 July 1974)
- 6981st Radio Group, Mobile (1 January 1956 – 1 July 1963)
- 6981st Radio Squadron, Mobile (8 May 1955 – 1 January 1956)
- 3d Radio Squadron, Mobile (2 November 1949 – 8 May 1955)
- 300th Radio Squadron, Mobile (19 March 1948 – 22 August 1949)
- 3d Radio Squadron, Mobile (14 November 1946 – 19 March 1948)
- 3d Radio Squadron, Mobile (G) (29 February 1944 – 3 October 1945)
- 951st Signal Radio Intelligence Company, Aviation (23 July 1942 – 29 February 1944)

== Bases stationed ==
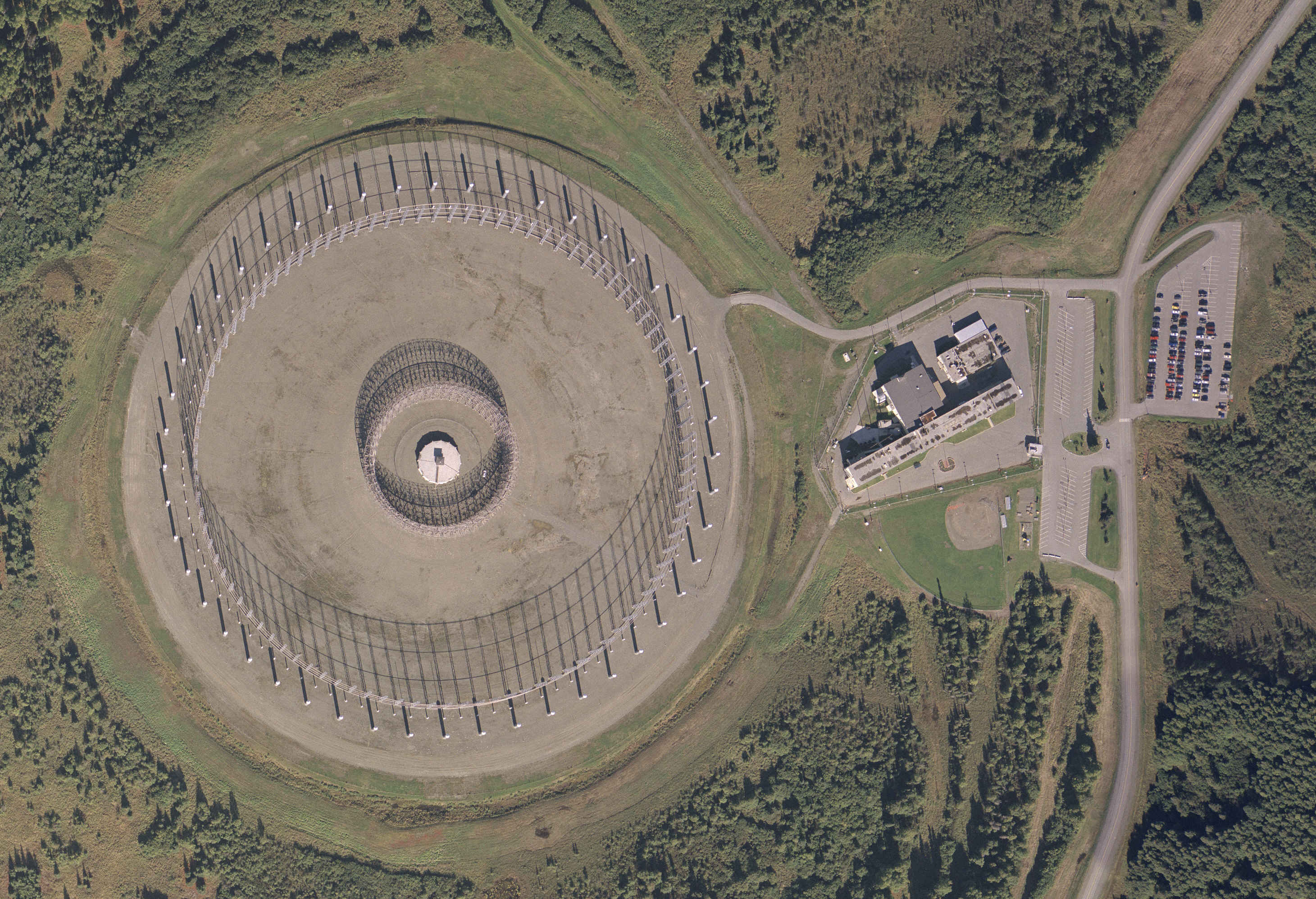
AN/FLR-9 at Elmendorf AFB, Alaska

- Joint Base Elmendorf-Richardson, Alaska (also designated as Elmendorf AFB) (1 June 1950 – present)
- Brooks AFB, Texas (23 November 1949 – 16 May 1950)
- Chicago, Illinois (8 April 1948 – 22 August 1949)
- Camp Patrick Henry, Virginia (3 October 1945 – 8 April 1948)
- Bad Kissingen, Germany (4 June 1945-September 1945)
- Chantilly, France (13 September 1944 – 4 June 1945)
- Blythe Bridge, England (4 December 1943 – 13 September 1944)
- Tidworth, England (4 September 1943 – 4 December 1943)
- Teddington, England (25 August 1943 – 4 September 1943)
- Camp Pinedale, California (23 January 1943 – 1 August 1943)
- Drew Field, Florida (19 September 1942 – 23 January 1943)
- Harding Field, Louisiana (24 August 1942 – 19 September 1942)

== Equipment operated ==
- AN/FLR-9 (1966 – 25 May 2016)

== Decorations ==
- Air Force Outstanding Unit Award
  - 1 October 1994 – 30 September 1995
  - 1 October 1993 – 30 September 1994
  - 1 July 1991 – 30 June 1993
  - 1 January 1976 – 31 December 1977
  - 1 July 1974 – 31 December 1975
  - 1 July 1972 – 30 June 1974
  - 1 July 1964 – 30 June 1966
  - 27 March 1964 – 30 March 1964 - for quick operational recovery after the 1964 Alaska earthquake
