= List of leaders of the Islamic State =

== List of leaders ==
=== Emirs of the Islamic State of Iraq ===
| No. | Portrait | Name (Birth–Death) | Time of Leadership | | | Note(s) |
| No. | Portrait | Name (Birth–Death) | Announced | Left office | Time in office | Note(s) |
|---|---|---|---|---|---|---|
| 1 | | Abu Omar al-Baghdadi حَمِيدُ دَاوُدَ مُحَمَّدُ خَلِيلِ ٱلزَّاوِيِّ (1959–2010) | 15 October 2006 | 18 April 2010 | 3 years, 185 days | Al-Baghdadi was killed when a joint operation of US and Iraqi forces rocketed a safe house 10 kilometers (6 mi) southwest of Tikrit. |
| 2 | | Abu Bakr al-Baghdadi أَبُو بَكْرٍ ٱلْبَغْدَادِيُّ (1971–2019) | 18 April 2010 | 7 April 2013 | 2 years, 354 days | The position was succeeded by a caliph after ISIL announced the establishment of a worldwide caliphate. |

=== Caliphs of the Islamic State ===
| No. | Portrait | Name (Birth–Death) | Time of Leadership | | | Note(s) |
| No. | Portrait | Name (Birth–Death) | Announced | Left office | Time in office | Note(s) |
|---|---|---|---|---|---|---|
| 1 | | Abu Bakr al-Baghdadi أَبُو بَكْرٍ ٱلْبَغْدَادِيُّ (1971–2019) | 7 April 2013 | 27 October 2019 | 6 years, 203 days | On 27 October 2019, US Joint Special Operations Command's 1st Special Forces Operational Detachment-Delta (SFOD-D) along with soldiers from the 75th Ranger Regiment and 160th Special Operations Aviation Regiment conducted a raid through air space controlled by Russia and Turkey into the rebel-held Idlib province of Syria on the border with Turkey to capture al-Baghdadi. He was cornered in a tunnel and died by self-detonating a suicide vest, killing alongside two other young children. |
| 2 | | Abu Ibrahim al-Hashimi al-Qurashi أبو إبراهيم الهاشمي القرشي (1976–2022) | 31 October 2019 | 3 February 2022 | 2 years, 95 days | On 3 February 2022, U.S. President Joe Biden announced that U.S. military forces successfully undertook a counterterrorism operation in the town of Atme in Idlib, resulting in the death of Abu Ibrahim al-Hashimi al-Qurashi by a suicide vest which also killed 12 others. |
| 3 | | Abu al-Hasan al-Qurashi أبو الحسن القرشي (19??–2022) | 4 February 2022 | 15 October 2022 | 253 days | Little is known about al-Qurashi. According to Iraqi security and government officials, al-Qurashi was the elder brother of former leader Abu Bakr al-Baghdadi. Research published by Hisham al-Hashimi in 2020 stated that al-Qurashi headed the five-member Shura Council. He killed himself on 15 October 2022 by detonating a suicide vest during an operation carried out by former Free Syrian Army rebels which had aligned with government forces in Daraa province. |
| 4 | | Abu al-Hussein al-Husseini al-Qurashi أبو الحسين الحسيني القرشي (19??–2023) | 30 November 2022 | 29 April 2023 | 150 days | Abu al-Hussein was announced as the new leader of Islamic State by Abu Omar al-Muhajir, in the same audio that confirmed Abu al-Hasan's death. The Islamic State announced on August 3, 2023 that Abu al-Hussein was killed by Tahrir al-Sham militants in Idlib province. |
| 5 | | Abu Hafs al-Hashimi al-Qurashi ابو حفص الهاشمي القريشي (born 19??) | 3 August 2023 | Incumbent | 3 years, 68 days | Abu Hafs was announced as the new leader of Islamic State, in the same audio that confirmed Abu al-Hussein's death. |

== List of spokesmen of the Islamic State ==
- Abu Mohammad al-Adnani (2014–2016)
- Abul-Hasan al-Muhajir (2016–2019)
- Abu Hamza Al-Qurashi (2019–2021)
- Abu Omar al-Muhajir (2021–2023)
- Abu Hudhayfah al-Ansari (2023–2026)

== List of ministers ==
The first cabinet of the Islamic State of Iraq was announced on 19 April 2007 and a reshuffle took place in 2009.

- First Minister: Abu Abdul Rahman al-Falahi (2007-2009), Abu Ayyub al-Masri† (2009-2010), Abu Abdullah al-Hassani al-Qurashi
- Minister of War: Abu Ayyub al-Masri† (2007-2010), Abu Suleiman al-Naser† (2010-2011)
- Minister of Sharia Affairs: Abu Uthman al-Tamimi
- Minister of Public Relations: Abu Bakr al-Jabouri
- Minister of Security: Abu Abdul Jabar al-Janabi
- Minister of Information: Abu Muhammad al-Mashadani (2007-2010), Ahmed Al-Tai (2009-)
- Minister of Martyrs and Prisoners Affairs: Abu Khadr al-Eissawi
- Minister of Oil: Abu Ahmed al-Janabi
- Minister of Agriculture and Fisheries: Mustafa al-A’araji
- Minister of Health: Abu Abdullah al-Zabadi
- Minister of Finance: Yunus al-Hamdani (2009-)

Following the death of Abu Suleiman al-Naser, the position of minister of war was replaced with a military council.

== List of leaders of the international branches of the Islamic State ==
List of known leaders of the international branches of the Islamic State part of the worldwide caliphate.

=== Islamic State – Caucasus Province ===
1. Rustam Asildarov (23 June 2015 – 3 December 2016)
2. Aslan Byutukayev (2016–2021)

=== Islamic State – Sahel Province ===
1. Adnan Abu Walid al-Sahrawi (13 May 2015 – 2019)
2. Abu al-Bara' al-Sahrawi (2019 (Possible) – present)

=== Islamic State – Khorasan Province ===
1. Hafiz Saeed Khan (2015 – July 2016)
2. Abdul Haseeb Logari (2016 – April 2017)
3. Abdul Rahman Ghaleb (April – July 2017)
4. Abu Saad Erhabi (July 2017 – August 2018)
5. Ziya ul-Haq (August 2018 – April 2019)
6. Abdullah Orokzai (April 2019 – April 2020)
7. Shahab al-Muhajir (April 2020 – present)

=== Islamic State in Libya ===
1. Abu Nabil al-Anbari (13 November 2014 – 13 November 2015)
2. Abdul Qader al-Najdi (March 2016 – September 2020)

=== Islamic State in Somalia ===
1. Abdul Qadir Mumin (22 October 2015 – ?)
2. Abdirahman Fahiye Isse Mohamud (? – present)

=== Islamic State – West Africa Province ===
1. Abubakar Shekau (2015–2016) – deposed for being too radical
2. Abu Musab al-Barnawi (2016 – 2019) – deposed and demoted without explanation
3. Abu Abdullahi Umar Al Barnawi "Ba Idrisa" (2019 – 2020) – purged and reportedly killed after some of his followers opposed his deposition
4. Lawan Abubakar "Ba Lawan" / "Abba Gana" (2020 – 2021)

==== Claimed leaders by media and officials ====
1. Lawan Abubakar (July – August 2021)
2. "Abu Dawud" / "Aba Ibrahim" (from August 2021)
3. Malam Bako or Abu Musab al-Barnawi (c. October 2021)
4. Sani Shuwaram (November 2021–February 2022)

=== Islamic State – Yemen Province ===
1. Abu Bilal al-Harbi (c. 2014 – March 2017 (or earlier))
2. Abu Osama al-Muhajir (POW) (March 2017 – 25 June 2019)
