= Territory of the Islamic State =

Islamic State of Iraq and the Levant (2013–2014) Islamic State (2014–present) الدَّولةُ الإِسْلَامِيَّة ad-Dawla al-Islāmiyya
- Flag Seal
- Motto: لَا إِلهَ إِلَّا اللَّهُ، مُحَمَّدٌ رَسُولُ اللَّهِ (Arabic) Lā ʾilāha ʾillā llāh, Muhammadun rasūlu llāh (Shahada) "There is no god but God; Muhammad is the messenger of God"; دَوْلَةُ الْإِسْلَامِ بَاقِيَةٌ وَتَتَمَدَّدُ (Arabic) Dawlat al-Islām Baqiya wa Tatamaddad "The Islamic State remains and expands"; خِلَافَةٌ عَلَى مِنْهَاجِ النُّبُوَّةِ (Arabic) Khilāfah ala Minhāj an-Nubuwwah "Caliphate Upon the Prophetic Methodology"
- Anthem: أُمَّتِي قَدْ لَاحَ فَجْرٌ (Arabic); Ummatī qad la-hā fajrūn "My Ummah, Dawn Has Appeared" (de facto)
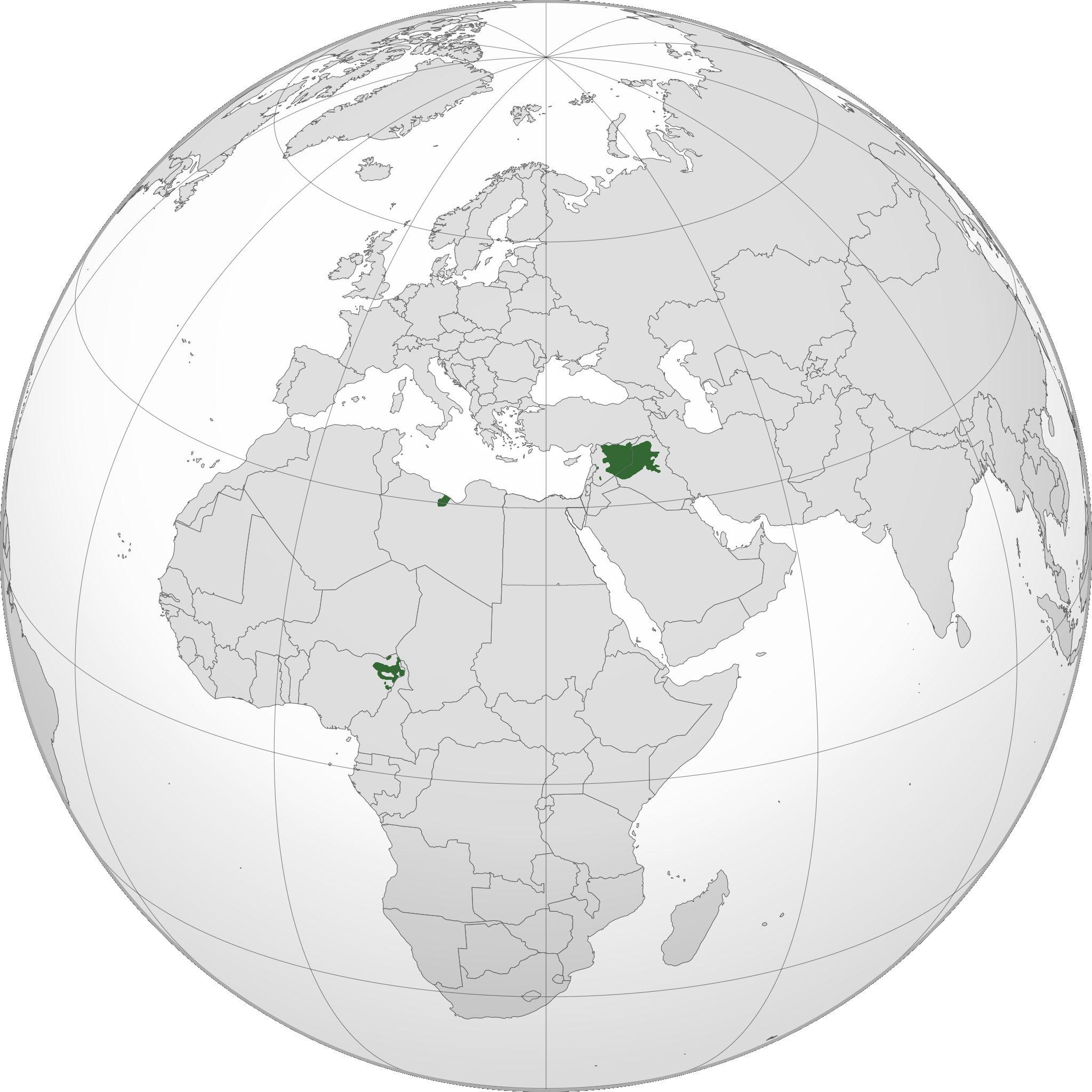
- Maximum extent of the Islamic State in May 2015
- Status: Unrecognized quasi-state designated as a terrorist organization
- Capital: Northwestern Idlib Governorate, Syria (March 2019–present) Former: Raqqa, Syria (2013–2017); Mayadin, Syria (June–October 2017); Al-Qa'im, Iraq (October–November 2017); Abu Kamal, Syria (November 2017); Hajin, Syria (November 2017 – December 2018); Al-Susah, Syria (December 2018 – January 2019); Al-Marashidah, Syria (January–February 2019); Al-Baghuz Fawqani, Syria (February–March 2019)
- Official languages: Arabic
- Religion: Sunni Islam (Salafism)
- Government: Totalitarian self-proclaimed Islamic caliphate
  - Caliph (Note: Emir of the Islamic State of Iraq and the Levant from 2013 to 2014): Abu Hafs al-Hashimi al-Qurashi
  - Head of the Shura Council: Abu Arkan al-Ameri
- Legislature: Shura
- Establishment: War in Iraq (2013–2017)
  - Established (Claim of territory in the Levant; replaced the territory of the Islamic State of Iraq): 8 April 2013
  - Separated from al-Qaeda: 3 February 2014
  - Declaration of caliphate: 29 June 2014
  - The Battle of Hasakah, the largest Islamic State uprising since its territorial defeat in Syria: January 2022

Area
  - At peak: 282,485 km^{2} (109,068 sq mi)

Population
  - 2015 estimate: (near max extent): 8–12 million
- Currency: Islamic State dinar (Note: In October 2015, a film was released showing how the Gold Dinar would be introduced as the sole official currency of the proto-state. De facto, however, it saw limited circulation. In the areas where it saw circulation, it was forbidden to use other currencies with the exception of the dollar. Other areas saw the use of different types of currencies such as the Syrian pound and the Iraqi dinar.); United States dollar (USD)
- Time zone: UTC+2 and +3 (EET and AST)
  - Summer (DST): UTC+3 (EEST)
Preceded by
Territory of the Islamic State of Iraq

The Islamic State (IS), formerly the Islamic State of Iraq and the Levant (ISIL) (Note: Abu Mohammad al-Adnani said: “the words ‘Iraq’ and ‘the Levant’ have been removed from the name of the Islamic State in official papers and documents.” As early 2026, still called "ISIL" by some newspaper.) from 2013–2014, is an unrecognized quasi-state and self-proclaimed caliphate that had its core in Iraq (2013–2017) and Syria (2013–2019), where it controlled significant swaths of urban, rural, and desert territory, primarily in the Mesopotamian region. Today the group controls scattered pockets of land in the area, as well as other minor strongholds or underground insurgent cells in other areas, notably Afghanistan, West Africa, the Sahara, Somalia, Mozambique, and the Democratic Republic of the Congo. As of 2023, large swathes of Mali have fallen under IS control.

In early 2017, IS controlled approximately 45,377 square kilometers (17,520 square miles) of territory in Iraq and Syria and 7,323 km^{2} of territory elsewhere, for a total of 52,700 square kilometres (20,300 sq mi). This represents a substantial decline from the group's territorial peak in late 2014, when it controlled between 100,000 and 110,000 square kilometres (39,000 and 42,000 sq mi) of territory in total. IS territory has declined substantially in almost every country since 2014, a result of the group's unpopularity and the military action taken against it. By late March 2019, IS territory in Syria was reduced to only the besieged 4,000 km^{2} (1,550 mi^{2}) Syrian Desert pocket. The enclave was surrounded by Syrian government forces and its allies. The Syrian military conducted combing operations and airstrikes against the pocket, but with limited success. IS propaganda claims a peak territorial extent of 282,485 km^{2}.

The majority of the Islamic State's territory, population, revenue, and prestige came from the territory it once held in Iraq and Syria. In Afghanistan, IS mostly controls territory near the Pakistan border and has lost 87% of its territory since spring 2015. In Lebanon, IS also controlled some areas on its border at the height of the Syrian war. In Libya, the group operates mostly as a moving insurgent force, occupying places before abandoning them again. In Egypt, the group controlled 910 km^{2} of land centered on the small city of Sheikh Zuweid, which represents less than 1% of Egypt's territory. In Nigeria, Boko Haram (at the time an IS affiliate) controlled 6,041 km^{2} of territory at its maximum extent in 2014, though most of this area was lost amid military reversals and a split within Boko Haram between pro- and anti-IS factions. By late 2019, however, IS's African forces had once again seized large areas in Nigeria; as of 2021, IS's African forces still run their own administrations in territories they control. As of 2024, most of IS's territory is confined to northeastern Nigeria and northern Mozambique, alongside large swathes of eastern Mali.

== Background ==
The fifth edition of the Islamic State's Dabiq magazine explained the group's process for establishing new provinces. Jihadist groups in a given area must consolidate into a unified body and publicly declare their allegiance to the caliph. The group must nominate a Wāli (Governor), a Shura Council (religious leadership), and formulate a military strategy to consolidate territorial control and implement Sharia law. Once formally accepted, IS considers the group to be one of its provinces and gives it support. Dabiq has acknowledged support in regions including East Turkestan, Indonesia and the Philippines, and claimed that IS would eventually establish wilayat in these areas after forming direct relationships with its supporters there.

== Specific territorial control ==
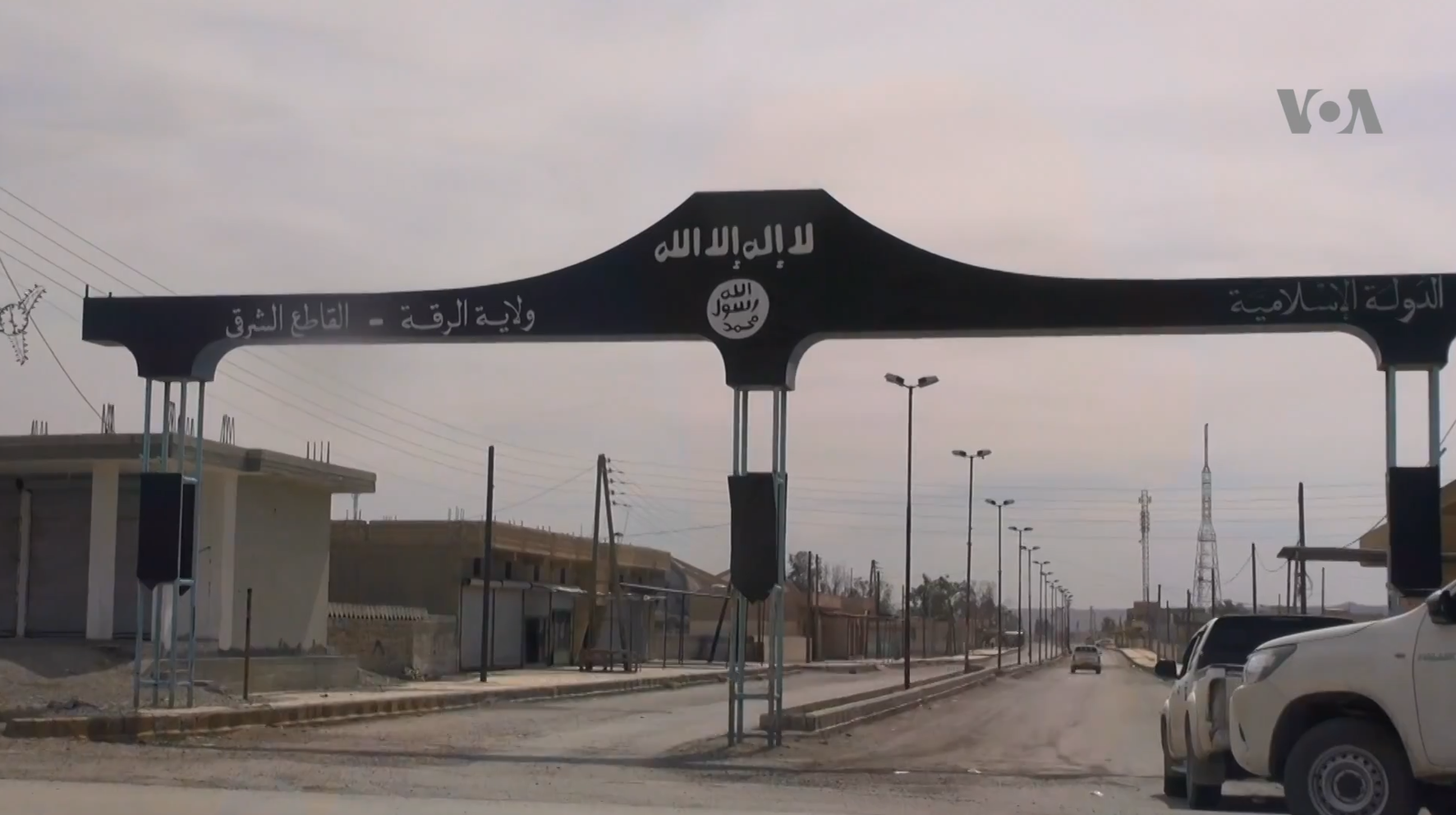
Gate adorned with Islamic State iconography in Al-Karamah, photographed shortly after its liberation during the Raqqa campaign.

The Islamic State primarily claimed territory in Syria and Iraq, subdividing each country into multiple wilayat (provinces), largely based on preexisting governance boundaries. The first territorial claims by the group outside of Syria and Iraq were announced by its leader, Abu Bakr al-Baghdadi, on 13 November 2014, when he announced new wilayats, or provinces, in Libya (Wilayah Barqah, Wilayah Tarabulus, and Wilayah Fazan), Algeria (Wilayah al-Jazair), Sinai, Egypt (Wilayah Sinai), Yemen (Wilayah al-Yaman), and Saudi Arabia (Wilayah al-Haramayn). In 2015, new provinces were also announced in the Afghanistan–Pakistan border (Wilayah Khurasan), Northern Nigeria (Wilayah Gharb Ifriqiyyah), the North Caucasus (Wilayah al-Qawqaz), and the Sahel (Sahil).

=== Iraq and Syria ===
Maximum extent of IS territorial control in Syria and Iraq in 2015.

When the Iraq-based insurgent group Mujahideen Shura Council announced it was establishing an Islamic State of Iraq in October 2006, it claimed authority over seven Iraqi provinces: Baghdad, Al Anbar, Diyala, Kirkuk, Saladin, Nineveh, and parts of Babil and Wasit. When the group changed its name to Islamic State of Iraq and the Levant and expanded into Syria in April 2013, it claimed nine Syrian provinces, covering most of the country and lying largely along existing provincial boundaries: Al Barakah (al-Hasakah Governorate), Al Khayr (Deir ez-Zor Governorate), Raqqa, Homs, Halab, Idlib, Hamah, Damascus, and Latakia.

IS rejected the political divisions established by Western powers during World War I in the Sykes–Picot Agreement as it absorbed territory in Syria and Iraq. It later subdivided the territory under its control to create the new provinces: al-Furat, encompassing al-Qa'im District and Rawah District of al Anbar Governorate in Iraq and Abu Kamal District of Deir ez-Zor Governorate in Syria; Dijlah and al-Jazirah divided out of Nineveh; and Fallujah and Shamal Baghdad. In June 2017 IS affiliate Khalid ibn al-Walid Army started referring to themselves as "Wilayat Hawran".

Since mid-2018, IS has referred to its territory in the Levant simply as Wilayat al-Sham and has done the same with Iraq calling it Wilayat al-Iraq, but still continues to acknowledge and use references to specific regions in those territories, this has also been done with its claims in Yemen and Libya.

On 9 December 2017 Iraqi military forces announced the war against IS in Iraq had been won and that they no longer controlled territory in Iraq. As of 2022, the group seems to have increased its efforts in Syria compared to Iraq, and has been reduced to several pockets in the Syrian desert, with local tribesmen acting as informants for the U.S. and other coalition forces. Despite this, the group managed to orchestrate a major prison break in Hasakh January 2022.

=== Afghanistan and Pakistan ===
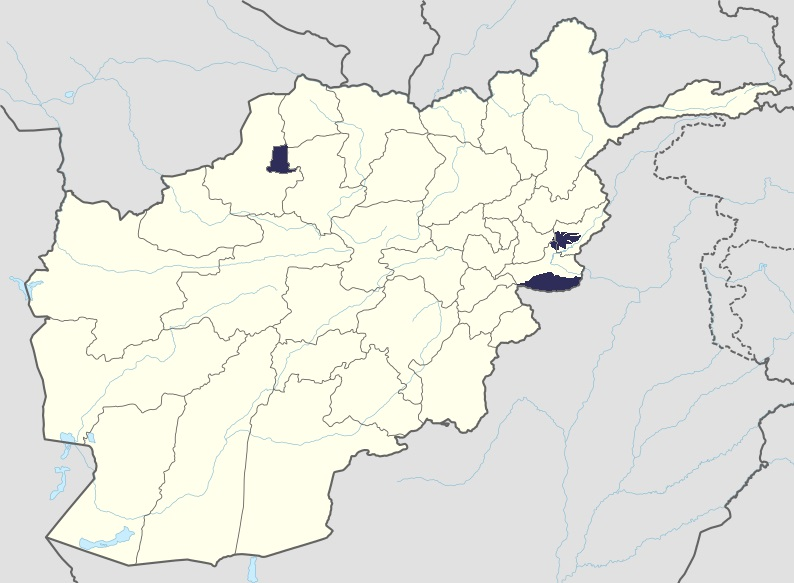
Territory of the Islamic State in Afghanistan at its peak

On 29 January 2015, Hafiz Saeed Khan, Abdul Rauf and other militants in the region swore an oath of allegiance to Abu Bakr al-Baghdadi. Khan was subsequently named as the Wāli (Governor) of a new branch in Afghanistan and Pakistan called Khurasan Province, named after the historical Khorasan region.

IS attempted to establish themselves in Southern Afghanistan, especially in Kandahar and Helmand provinces, but were resisted by Taliban forces. They were able to establish a foothold in parts of Nangarhar, and recruited disaffected members of the Taliban. In August 2015, the Islamic Movement of Uzbekistan leader, Usman Ghazi, swore allegiance to IS and announced that the group should be considered part of Wilayah Khurasan.

The group suffered reversals in 2016, losing control of some territory in the wake of attacks from US Forces, the Afghan Government and the Taliban. Hafiz Saeed Khan was reportedly killed in a US drone strike in eastern Afghanistan on 25 July 2016.

In 2019, the group announced a new Pakistan province (Wilayah Pakistan). Despite this, as of 2022, the Khorasan province continues to operate in the country, also operating against neighboring Uzbekistan and Tajikistan, where some members have suggested that a Movarounnahr (or Transoxiana) province is established. In July 2022, a Tajik-language magazine called Al-Azaim Tajiki was endorsed by the group, named after Yusuf al-Tajiki, a propagandist for the group killed by the Taliban.

Since the Taliban's 2021 offensive, which ended with the takeover of Kabul and the end of the 20-year war in the country, IS-K have become a new focus for the group, with its funding and numbers increasing as a result of prison breaks of IS fighters during the offensive and subsequent recruiting. Efforts have also increased to recruit fighters from neighboring Uzbekistan.

=== Libya ===
Territory controlled by IS in Libya in early 2016

IS divides Libya into three historical provinces, claiming authority over Cyrenaica in the east, Fezzan in the desert south, and Tripolitania in the west, around the capital of Tripoli.

In 2014, a number of leading IS commanders arrived in the city of Derna, which had been a major source of fighters in the Syrian civil war and Iraqi insurgency. Over a number of months, they united many local militant factions under their leadership and declared war on anyone who opposed them, killing judges, civic leaders, local militants who rejected their authority, and other opponents. On 5 October 2014, the militants, who by then controlled part of the city, gathered to pledge allegiance to the Caliph Abu Bakr al-Baghdadi. In February 2015, IS forces took over parts of the Libyan city of Sirte. In the following months, they used it as a base to capture neighbouring towns including Harawa, and Nofaliya. IS began governing Sirte and treating it as the capital of their territory.

As of March 2015, the group claimed control over the following oil fields in Libya:

Oil field	Date
Al-Bahi Oil Field	5 March 2015
Al-Dhara Oil Field	5 March 2015
Al-Mabrouk Oil Field	5 March 2015
Al-Joufra Oil Field	5 March 2015
Tibesti Oil Field	5 March 2015
Al-Ghani Oil Field	5 March 2015
Al-Samah Oil Field	5 March 2015
Al-Baida Oil Field	5 March 2015
Al-Waha Oil Field	5 March 2015
Al-Dafa Oil Field	5 March 2015
Al-Naqa Oil Field	5 March 2015

IS suffered reversals from mid-2015 when they were expelled from much of Derna following clashes with rival militants, following months of intermittent fighting, IS eventually redeployed to other parts of Libya. Its emir Abu Nabil al-Anbari was killed in a U.S. air strike in November 2015. Libya's Interim Government launched a major offensive against IS territory around Sirte in May 2016, capturing the city by December 2016.

The group's current emir is Abu Bara al Sahrawi, who replaced Adnan Abu Walid al Sahrawi after his death in August 2021.

=== Egypt ===
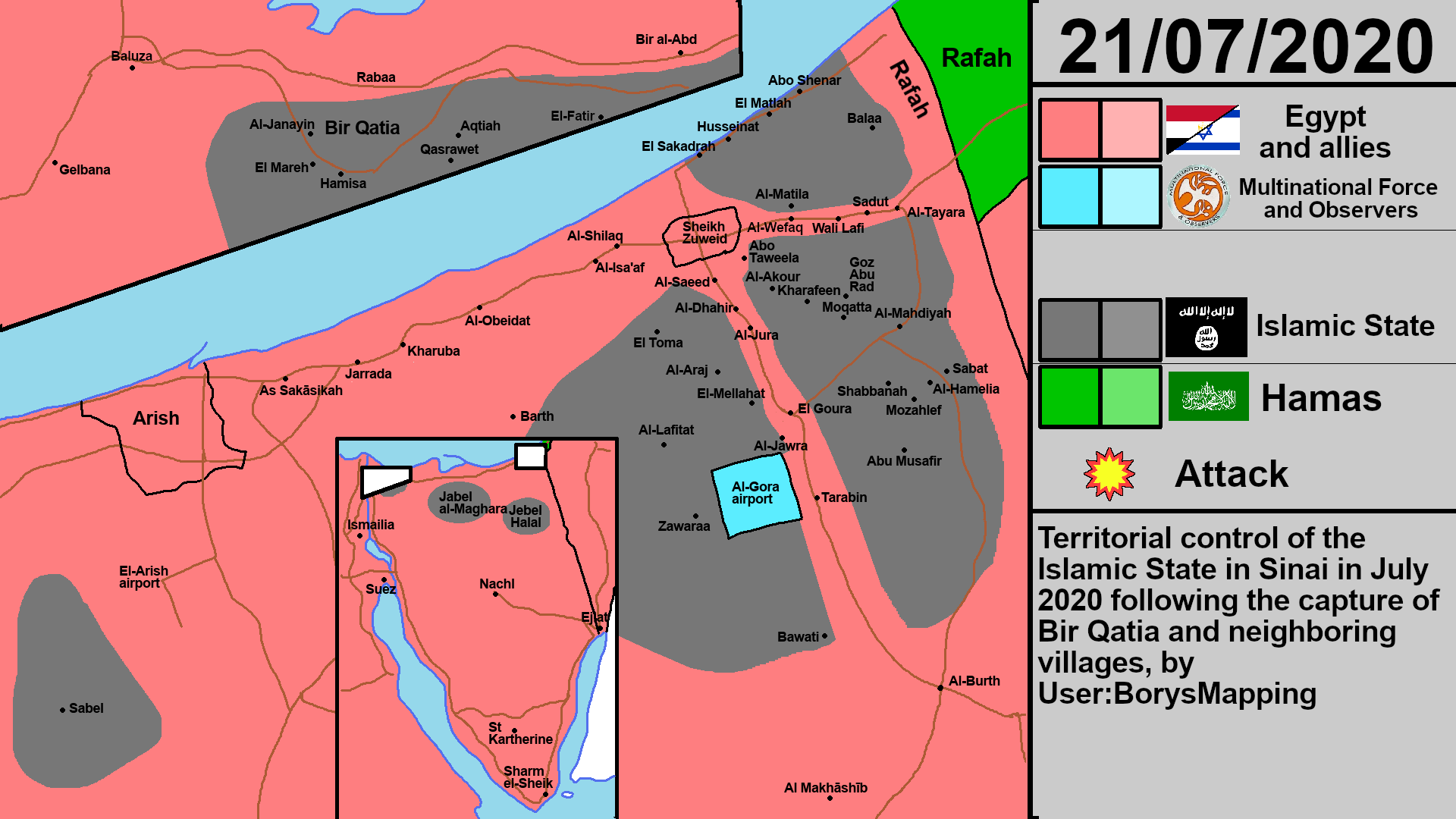
Map that shows Islamic Control areas in Sinai at its peak in July 2020

The Egyptian militant group Ansar Bayt al-Maqdis swore allegiance to IS in November 2014. After al-Baghdadi's speech on 13 November, the group changed its name to Sinai Province on the Twitter feed claiming to represent the group. The group has carried out attacks in Sinai.

On 1 July 2015, Wilayat Sinai launched a large-scale invasion on the Egyptian city of Sheikh Zuweid with more than 300 IS fighters and attacked more than 15 army and police positions using mortars, RPG's, light and heavy weapons in an attempt to capture the city.

On 29 February 2016, the Islamic State – Egypt Province released a propaganda video that targets Coptic Christians.

In 2020, IS in Egypt occupied villages in Bir al-Abd town in North Sinai.

In 2022, while having lost most of its territory, the group continued to attack local infrastructure, but this diminished due to persistent counterterrorism efforts by the Egyptian government and armed forces, who operated with the assistance of local tribesmen.

As of 2023, the Islamic State – Sinai Province is defunct, with the insurgency in the Sinai having ended.

=== Yemen ===
IS established a Yemeni Wilayah in November 2014. The branch's first attack occurred in March 2015, when it carried out suicide bombings on two Shia Mosques in the Yemeni capital. At least eight IS Wilayat, named after existing provincial boundaries in Yemen, have claimed responsibility for attacks, including 'Adan Abyan Province, Al-Bayda Province, Hadramawt Province, Shabwah Province and Sana'a Province. Following the outbreak of the Yemeni Civil War in 2015, IS struggled to establish much of a presence in the country in the face of competition from the larger and more established Al-Qaeda in the Arabian Peninsula (AQAP) militant group. Many of IS's regional cells in Yemen have not been visibly active since their establishment and the group has not been able to seize control of territory the way they have done in Iraq and Syria. The group has also experienced leadership turmoil and defections from its rank and file.

As of 2022, the group serves a key financial intermediary between Somalia and Khorasan provinces.

=== Nigeria and West Africa ===
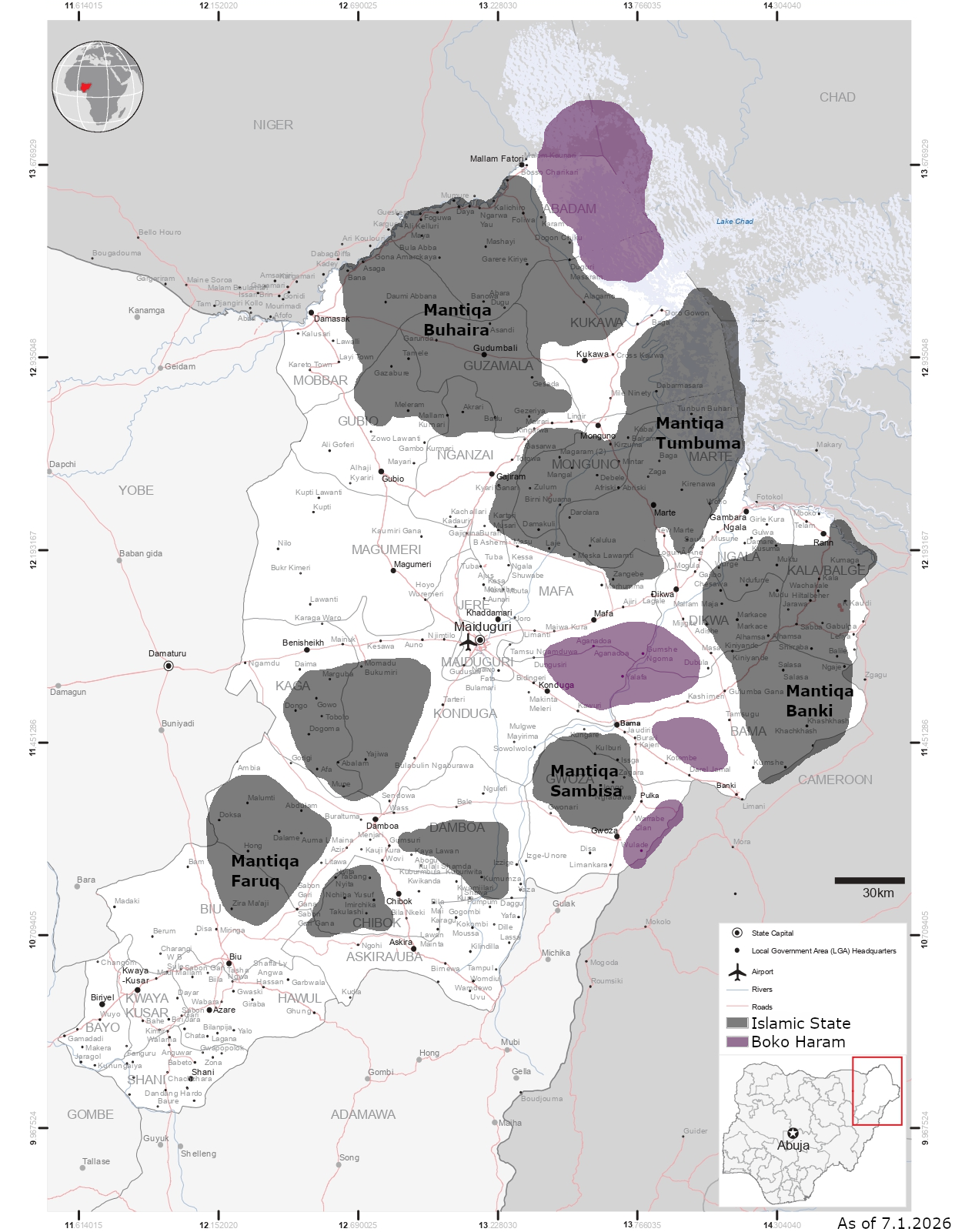
Territorial control in Northeastern Nigeria as of 2026

On 7 March 2015, Boko Haram's leader Abubakar Shekau pledged allegiance to IS via an audio message posted on the organisation's Twitter account. Abu Mohammad al-Adnani welcomed the pledge of allegiance, and described it as an expansion of the group's caliphate to West Africa. IS publications from late March 2015 began referring to members of Boko Haram as part of Wilayat Gharb Ifriqiyyah (Islamic State's West Africa Province). Boko Haram suffered significant reversals in the year following the pledge of allegiance, with an offensive by the Nigerian military, assisted by neighboring powers, driving them from much of the territory they had seized in North East Nigeria. Boko Haram suffered a split in 2016, with IS appointing 'Abu Musab al-Barnawi' as the group's new leader, due to disagreements with Abubakar Shekau's leadership. This was rejected by Shekau and his supporters, who continued to operate independently.

On 24 January 2022, the small town of Gudumbali was captured and declared as the province's capital. However, it was recaptured by Nigerian troops on 26 January.

In the summer of 2022, ISWAP made several territorial gains in Nigeria.

As of September 2022, the group continues to maintain its stronghold in northeastern Nigeria, and has again integrated or eclipsed its former competitor Boko Haram, as several fighters have rejoined the group. The group also orchestrated a prison break in July, near Abuja.

In October 2022, the town of Ansongo was captured by IS's Sahel province.

=== Somalia ===
The Islamic State in Somalia (ISS) has been active since 2015, and though it remains a small militia of around 300 fighters, it has been considered possible by experts that ISS controls a number of villages in Puntland's hinterland. Furthermore, the group managed to capture and hold the town of Qandala for over a month in late 2016. At first, ISS did not receive official recognition by the Islamic State, however, this was subsequently granted by December 2017.

As of 2022, the group serves as an intermediary for IS provinces in Africa and the leadership based in Syria and Iraq. It also finances ISKP via Yemen.

=== Sahel region ===
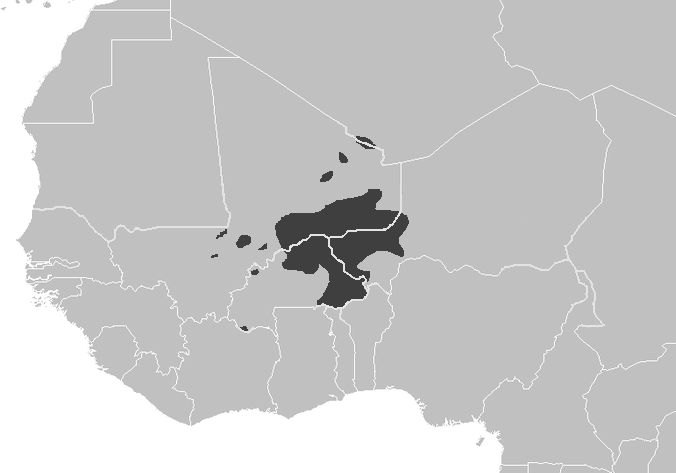
ISGS activity area in the Sahel

The Islamic State – Sahel Province was formed on 15 May 2015 as the result of a split within the militant group Al-Mourabitoun. The rift was a reaction to the adherence of one of its leaders, Adnan Abu Walid al-Sahraoui, to the Islamic State. From March 2019 to 2022, IS-GS was formally part of the Islamic State – West Africa Province (ISWAP); when it was also called "ISWAP-Greater Sahara". In March 2022, IS declared the province autonomous, separating it from its West Africa Province and naming it Islamic State – Sahel Province (ISSP) the group would go on to take over large swathes of Mali, Niger and Burkina Faso. Between 2022 and 2023, the group saw major gains in the Mali War, occupying large swarths of territory in southeastern Mali. Tidermène was captured by the group on 12 April 2023.

=== East Asia ===
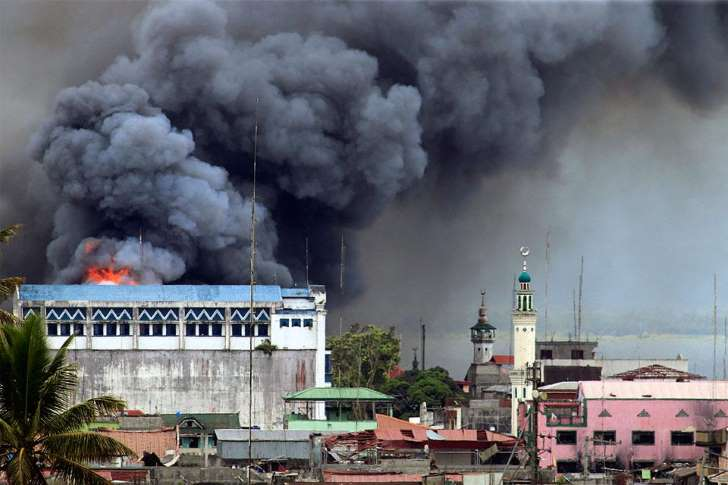
A building in Marawi set ablaze after President Rodrigo Duterte ordered the Philippine Air Force to conduct airstrikes against IS insurgents in the city during the Battle of Marawi

Abu Sayyaf is IS's most powerful affiliate in the Philippines; another IS-affiliated group is the Maute group. Both groups worked together with other IS affiliates to seize parts of Marawi City on 23 May 2017, starting the Battle of Marawi.

On 16 October, IS's Emir of Southeast Asia Isnilon Hapilon, along with the Maute group's remaining leader Omar Maute was killed by the Armed Forces of the Philippines. Previously, the Maute group's co-leader and Omar's brother Abdullah Maute, as well as their other five male siblings, had been neutralized by the ongoing counter-offensives. Two days after the leaders' death, the Armed Forces of the Philippines said Malaysian terrorist and senior commander Mahmud Ahmad is also presumed killed in another operation.

The Battle of Marawi was declared over by 23 October by the government, at which point all participating militants have been successfully neutralized, effectively blocking IS's Asian expansion. The government wiped out the Maute group after the battle.

In December 2017, remnants of the Maute group started recruiting new members to form a new group called "Turaifie Group" whose leader, Abu Turaifie, claimed himself to be a successor of former leader Abu Sayyaf Isnilon Hapilon.

As of 2022, only pockets in Indonesia and the Philippines remain, and major attacks have decreased as a result of successful counterterrorism efforts by the governments of both states.

During 2023, IS witnessed a major resurgence in the Philippines (especially from August), with the group claiming more attacks in the country than during the previous 2 years combined, including several significant attacks such as the Mindanao State University bombing in Marawi.

On 22 March 2024, the Philippines announced that Abu Sayyaf had been "fully dismantled", bringing an end to the decades-long jihadist insurgency.

According to the Islamic State Al-Naba newspaper, the group continued to conduct attacks on the Philippine Government and Army and the Moro militias until 11 April, which is yet to be confirmed by official Philippine Government sources.

=== Democratic Republic of the Congo ===
In October 2017, a video emerged on pro-IS channels that showed a small number of militants in the Democratic Republic of the Congo who declared to be part of the "City of Monotheism and Monotheists" (MTM) group. The leader of the group went on to say that "this is Dar al-Islam of the Islamic State in Central Africa" and called upon other like-minded individuals to travel to MTM territory in order to join the war against the government. The Long War Journal noted that though this pro-IS group in Congo appeared to be very small, its emergence had gained a notable amount of attention from IS sympathizers. On 24 July 2019, a video was released referring to IS's presence in the country as the Central African Wilayat showing fighters pledging allegiance to Abu Bakr al-Baghdadi.

As of 2022, the group has doubled its territory and increased its numbers as a result of orchestrated prison breaks, with 2,000 prisoners freed since 2020.

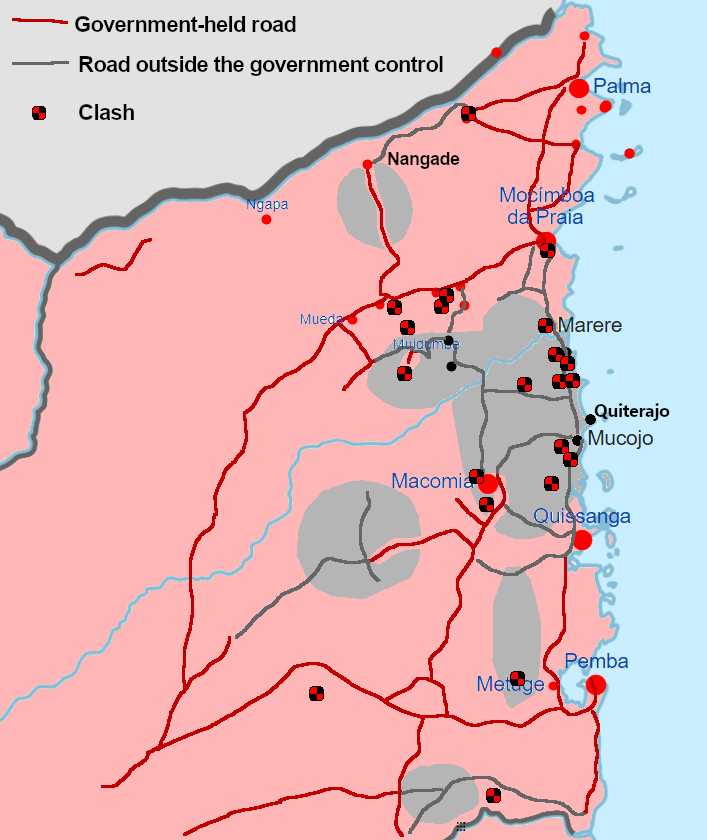
Military situation in Mozambique as of September 2025

=== Mozambique ===
After taking control of the Mozambican town of Mocímboa da Praia during an offensive in August 2020, local IS insurgents declared it the capital of their province. The militants consequently expanded further by capturing several islands in the Indian Ocean, with Vamizi Island being the most prominent. However, the 2021 Cabo Delgado offensives caused the Mozambican Government to regain control of Mocímboa da Praia and other territories, leaving current territorial control in Mozambique to be limited to only a few small towns and villages.

In May 2022, the province was separated from Central Africa Province and became known as the Islamic State – Mozambique Province.

== Administrative organization ==
=== Provinces ===
The Islamic State's main base of operations was in their territory of ar-Raqqah in Syria, until 2017, when it was recaptured by the Syrian Democratic Forces. From there, orders were given to affiliate groups, called wilāyat, spread across the Levant, Asia and Africa. Few of these wilāyat have declared their capital cities, with the exception of ash-Shām with Ar-Raqqah, al-ʿIrāq with Mosul, and Central Africa with Mocímboa da Praia. It also had claims on the entirety of the Muslim world, including Central Asia, the former Ottoman Balkans, South East Asia, and the northern part of Africa. Other times, however, it expressed also a desire for world domination, with labels on certain areas of the old world as well as the new world.

Wilāyat (Province)	Part of	Established (as a wilāyat)
Algeria (al-Jazāʾir) (Note: Some provinces existed only de jure as the Islamic State did not exercise control over these territories)	Algeria	13 November 2014
Azerbaijan (Aḏarbayjān)	Azerbaijan	2 July 2019
Bengal (al-Banġāl)	Bangladesh	September 2016
Caucasus (al-Qawqāz) (Note: Includes the Russian North Caucasus (mainly Islamic areas such as Dagestan or Chechnya), as well as Georgia, Armenia and Azerbaijan.)	Russia; Armenia; Azerbaijan (formerly); Georgia; Abkhazia; South Ossetia	23 June 2015
Central Africa (Wasaṭ Ifrīqiyah)	Democratic Republic of the Congo; Mozambique (formerly); Tanzania (Note: A faction known as the "Islamic State in Somalia, Kenya, Tanzania, and Uganda" was set up in April 2016, but was only active in Somalia as well as Kenya for a short time.); Uganda	Before August 2018
Hijaz (al-Ḥijāz)	Saudi Arabia (partial)	November 2014
India (al-Hind)	India	11 May 2019 (from Khorasan)
Iraq (al-ʿIrāq)	Iraq; Syria (partial)	2018 (from Al Anbar, al-Badia, al-Jazirah, Dijlah, al-Janub, Baghdad, Diyala, Fallujah, Kirkuk, Ninawa, Saladin and Shamal Baghdad)
Khorasan (Ḵurāsān)	Afghanistan; India (formerly); Iran; Pakistan (partial); Tajikistan	26 January 2015
Lebanon (Lubnān)	Lebanon	2022 (From Syria)
Libya (Lībiyā)	Libya	2018 (from Cyrenaica, Fezzan, and Tripolitania)
Egypt (Miṣr)	Egypt	2015
Mozambique (Mūzambīq)	Mozambique	May 2022 (from Central Africa)
Najd (Najd)	Saudi Arabia (partial); Kuwait	November 2014
Pakistan (Bākistān)	Pakistan	15 May 2019 (from Khorasan)
Philippines (al-Filibbīn)	Philippines	April 2016
Sahel (as-Sāḥil)	Mali; Niger (partial); Burkina Faso; Benin	15 May 2015 (from West Africa)
Sinai (Sīnāʼ)	Egypt	13 November 2014
Somalia (aṣ-Ṣūmāl) (Note: A Propaganda video under the name "Hunt Them Down, O Monotheists", used the name Wilayat al-Somal (Somalia Province). Since then, however, the new name has not been consistently applied to the group by pro-IS media.)	Somalia; Puntland; Somaliland	December 2017 (Recognition)
Syria (aš-Šām) (Note: The Islamic State controlled some territory outside of its wilayat under the Khalid ibn al-Walid Army until 2018, which administered its territory from Al-Shajara.)	Syria; Iraq (partial)	2018 (from al-Barakah, al-Furat, al-Khair, al-Raqqah, Halab, Homs, Dimashq, Hamah and Hawran)
Tunisia (Tūnis)	Tunisia	2015
West Africa (Ġarb Ifrīqiyah)	Nigeria; Cameroon; Chad; Niger (partial); Mali (formerly); Burkina Faso (formerly)	2015; 2016 (after split with Boko Haram); March 2022 (autonomy granted)
Yemen (al-Yaman)	Yemen	2018 (from Aden-Abyan, Al Bayda, Ataq, Green Brigade, Hadramaut, Lahij, Sanaa, and Shabwah)

==== Former provinces ====
Since mid-2018, IS has referred to its territory in the Levant simply as Wilayat al-Sham and has done the same with Iraq calling it Wilayat al-Iraq, but still continues to acknowledge and use references to specific regions in those territories. This has also been done with its claims in Libya and Yemen.

Wilāyat (Province)	Part of	Established (as a wilayah)	Merged into
Aden-Abyan (ʿAdan Abyan)	Yemen	2014	Yemen (al-Yaman)
Bayda (al-Bayḍāʾ)	Yemen	2014	Yemen (al-Yaman)
Green Brigade (al-Liwā al-Aḵḍar)	Yemen	2014	Yemen (al-Yaman)
Lahij (Laḥj)	Yemen	2014	Yemen (al-Yaman)
Hadramaut (Ḥaḍramawt)	Yemen	2014	Yemen (al-Yaman)
Sana'a (Ṣanʿāʾ)	Yemen	2014	Yemen (al-Yaman)
Shabwah (Shabwah)	Yemen	2014	Yemen (al-Yaman)
Cyrenaica (Barqah)	Libya	2014	Libya (Lībiyā)
Fezzan (Fazzān)	Libya	2014	Libya (Lībiyā)
Tripolitania (Ṭarābulus)	Libya	2014	Libya (Lībiyā)
Anbar (al-Anbār)	Iraq	2013	Iraq (al-ʿIrāq)
Badia (al-Bādiyah)	Iraq (Ba'athist Syria) Syria (partial)	2018	Iraq (al-ʿIrāq)
Baghdad (Baġdād)	Iraq	2014	Iraq (al-ʿIrāq)
Diyala (Diyālā)	Iraq	2014	Iraq (al-ʿIrāq)
Fallujah (al-Fallūjah)	Iraq	2014	Iraq (al-ʿIrāq)
Janub (al-Janūb)	Iraq	2014	Iraq (al-ʿIrāq)
Jazirah (al-Jazīrah)	Iraq	2015	Iraq (al-ʿIrāq)
Kirkuk (Karkūk)	Iraq	2014	Iraq (al-ʿIrāq)
Nineveh (Nīnawā)	Iraq	2014	Iraq (al-ʿIrāq)
North Baghdad (Šamāl Baġdād)	Iraq	2014	Iraq (al-ʿIrāq)
Saladin (Ṣalāḥ ad-Dīn)	Iraq	2014	Iraq (al-ʿIrāq)
Tigris (Dijlah)	Iraq	2015	Iraq (al-ʿIrāq)
Aleppo (Ḥalab)	(Ba'athist Syria) Syria	2014	Syria (aš-Šām)
Barakah (al-Barakah)	(Ba'athist Syria) Syria; Iraq (partial)	2014	Syria (aš-Šām)
Damascus (Dimašq)	(Ba'athist Syria) Syria	2015	Syria (aš-Šām)
Euphrates (al-Furāt)	Iraq (Ba'athist Syria) Syria (partial)	2014	Syria (aš-Šām)
Homs (Ḥimṣ)	(Ba'athist Syria) Syria	2014	Syria (aš-Šām)
Hamah (Ḥamāh)	(Ba'athist Syria) Syria	2015	Syria (aš-Šām)
Hauran (Ḥawrān)	(Ba'athist Syria) Syria	2018	Syria (aš-Šām)
al-Khayr (al-Ḵayr)	(Ba'athist Syria) Syria; Iraq (partial)	2014	Syria (aš-Šām)
Raqqah (ar-Raqqah)	(Ba'athist Syria) Syria	2014	Syria (aš-Šām)
Turkey (Turkiyā)	Turkey	July 2019	In 2026, MEMRI reported that both the Islamic State – Turkey Province and the Islamic State – East Asia Province had been demoted from provincial status, with the process taking place between 2024 and 2026. Despite the demotion, the groups remained active and continue to claim attacks without referring to themselves as a province.
East Asia (Šārq Āsiyā)	Brunei; Indonesia; Malaysia; Philippines	2014	In 2026, MEMRI reported that both the Islamic State – Turkey Province and the Islamic State – East Asia Province had been demoted from provincial status, with the process taking place between 2024 and 2026. Despite the demotion, the groups remained active and continue to claim attacks without referring to themselves as a province.

== Government ==
=== Leadership and governance ===
From 2013 to 2019, IS was headed and run by Abu Bakr al-Baghdadi, the Islamic State's self-styled Caliph. Before their deaths, he had two deputy leaders, Abu Muslim al-Turkmani for Iraq and Abu Ali al-Anbari (also known as Abu Ala al-Afri) for Syria, both ethnic Turkmen. Advising al-Baghdadi were a cabinet of senior leaders, while its operations in Iraq and Syria are controlled by local 'emirs,' who head semi-autonomous groups that the Islamic State refers to as its provinces. Beneath the leaders are councils on finance, leadership, military matters, legal matters (including decisions on executions) foreign fighters' assistance, security, intelligence and media. In addition, a shura council has the task of ensuring that all decisions made by the governors and councils comply with the group's interpretation of sharia. While al-Baghdadi had told followers to "advise me when I err" in sermons, according to observers "any threat, opposition, or even contradiction is instantly eradicated".

According to Iraqis, Syrians, and analysts who study the group, almost all of IS's leaders—including the members of its military and security committees and the majority of its emirs and princes—are former Iraqi military and intelligence officers, specifically former members of Saddam Hussein's Ba'ath government who lost their jobs and pensions in the de-Ba'athification process after that regime was overthrown. The former Chief Strategist in the Office of the Coordinator for Counterterrorism of the US State Department, David Kilcullen, has said, "There undeniably would be no Isis if we had not invaded Iraq." It has been reported that Iraqis and Syrians have been given greater precedence over other nationalities within IS because the group needs the loyalties of the local Sunni populations in both Syria and Iraq in order to be sustainable. Other reports, however, have indicated that Syrians are at a disadvantage to foreign members, with some native Syrian fighters resenting "favouritism" allegedly shown towards foreigners over pay and accommodation.

In August 2016, media reports based on briefings by Western intelligence agencies suggested that IS had a multilevel secret service known in Arabic as Emni, established in 2014, that has become a combination of an internal police force and an external operations directorate complete with regional branches. The unit was believed to be under the overall command of IS's most senior Syrian operative, spokesman and propaganda chief Abu Mohammad al-Adnani until his death by airstrike in late August 2016.

On 27 October 2019, the United States conducted a special operation targeting al-Baghdadi's compound in Barisha, Idlib, Northwest Syria. The attack resulted in al-Baghdadi's death; caught by surprise and unable to escape, al-Baghdadi detonated a suicide vest, deliberately killing both himself and two children who had been living in the compound prior to the assault. U.S. president Donald Trump stated in a televised announcement that Baghdadi had, in fact, died during the operation and that American forces used support from helicopters, jets and drones through airspace controlled by Russia and Turkey. He said, "Russia treated us great... Iraq was excellent. We really had great cooperation" and Turkey knew they were going in. He thanked Turkey, Russia, Syria, Iraq and the Syrian Kurdish forces for their support. The Turkish Defence Ministry also confirmed on Sunday that Turkish and U.S. military authorities exchanged and coordinated information ahead of an attack in Syria's Idlib. Fahrettin Altun, a senior aide to Turkish president Tayyib Erdogan, also stated, among other things, "Turkey was proud to help the United States, our NATO ally, bring a notorious terrorist to justice" and that Turkey "will continue to work closely with the United States and others to combat terrorism in all its forms and manifestations." Kremlin spokesman Dmitry Peskov declined to say if the United States had told Russia about the raid in advance but said that its result if confirmed, represented a serious contribution by the United States to combat terrorism. Russia had previously claimed Baghdadi was killed in May 2017 by their airstrike.

In September 2019, a statement attributed to IS's propaganda arm, the Amaq news agency, claimed that Abdullah Qardash was named as al-Baghdadi's successor. Analysts dismissed this statement as a fabrication, and relatives were reported as saying that Qardash died in 2017. Rita Katz, a terrorism analyst and the co-founder of SITE Intelligence, noted that the alleged statement used a different font when compared to other statements and it was never distributed on Amaq or IS channels.

On 29 October 2019, Trump stated on social media that al-Baghdadi's "number one replacement" had been killed by American forces, without giving a name. A U.S. official later confirmed that Trump was referring to IS spokesman and senior leader Abul-Hasan al-Muhajir, who was killed in a U.S. airstrike in Syria two days earlier. On 31 October, IS named Abu Ibrahim al-Hashemi al-Qurayshi as Baghdadi's successor. On 3 February 2022, it was reported by a US official that al-Hashimi killed himself and members of his family by triggering an explosive device, during a counter-terrorism raid by the US Joint Special Operations Command. On 30 November 2022, IS announced that their next leader, Abu al-Hasan al-Hashimi al-Qurashi, had been killed in battle and named a successor, providing no additional information other than his pseudonym, Abu al-Hussein al-Husseini al-Qurashi, who was believed to be the Islamic State's first Syrian chief. A spokesman for U.S. Central Command confirmed that IS's leader had been killed in mid-October by anti-government rebels in southern Syria. On 16 February 2023, senior IS leader Hamza al-Homsi blew himself up in a U.S.-led raid in Syria. On 23 April 2023, IS leader Abu al-Hussein al-Husseini al-Qurashi was killed in an attack on his residence at Jindires, in the northwestern Idlib Governorate. Turkey claimed responsibility for his death, while the Islamic State claimed that al-Husseini al-Qurashi was killed in a shootout with Tahrir al-Sham (HTS) forces. Subsequently, the Islamic State named Abu Hafs al-Hashimi al-Qurashi as their new leader. In late August 2025, US Special Forces carried out a helicopter raid at Atmeh, near the Turkish border region. They killed two senior IS leaders in the raid, including a figure who was believed to be next-in-line for the Islamic State leadership. Analysts believe that the Islamic State is headquartered in the northwestern Idlib Governorate region, near the Turkish border, ever since the group lost their last territorial stronghold at Al-Baghuz Fawqani in Spring 2019.

=== Ministries ===
In addition to its territorial administration, the group also established dāwāwīn (ministries) for the political administration of the quasi-state under al-Baghdadi's administration, modelled after Abu Ayyub al-Masri's infrastructure for the Islamic State of Iraq.

Dīwān / Ministry	Date of creation	Function
Education and Teaching (Note: Also known as the Diwan of Education or the Diwan of Education and Teaching of Islamic State.); Diwan al-Tarbiyya wa al-Ta’lim	July 2014	Responsible for education in a regular and extremist context. Its first minister was Reda Seyam.
Services; Diwan al-Khidamat	June 2014	Responsible for the administration of public spaces, such as parks and roads. One example of the latter was the construction of "Caliphate Way", a highway built in the industrial area of Mosul, which reduced congestion in the area.
Rikaz (Note: Another official name is the Diwan of Resources, and it is also known as the Diwan of Natural Resources or the Diwan of Precious Resources.); Diwan al-Rikaz	?	Responsible for handling and exploitation of profitable resources. Its two known divisions handle fossil fuels (e.g. petroleum) and antiquities.
Da'wah and Masajid (and Awqaf); Diwan al-Da’wah wa al-Masajid (wa al-Awqaf)	?	Responsible for Dawah and mosque and religious staff administration.
Health; Diwan al-Sihha	June 2014	Responsible for health services and hospitals. An "Islamic State Health Service" was established in 2015, featuring a logo modelled after the one used by the British National Health Service. All medical schools served under this ministry rather than the Ministry of Education.
Tribal Relations; Diwan al-Asha'ir	?	Responsible for dealing with nomadic tribes in the core region of IS. While the group committed atrocities against tribes such as Al-Shaitat and documents obtained after the group's loss of territory reflect a harsh tone against the nomadic groups, other documents show organized deliveries of supplies to the same groups. This dīwān was also known as an Office.
Diwan al-Amn (Islamic State Intelligence)	?	Responsible for public security and anti-espionage operations.
Zakah; Diwan al-Zakah	June 2014	Responsible for the collection and distribution of the Zakah.
Treasury; Diwan Bayt al-mal	?	Responsible for the finances of the group and the dinar. Its Diwan al-Musadara is responsible for expropriations and is based on medieval Islam.
Hisbah; Diwan al-Hisbah	?	The Hisbah (religious police) served this ministry, being in charge of enforcing the group's version of Islamic jurisprudence (sharia law) in public.
Judgement and Grievances; Diwan al-Qada wa al-Mazalim	?	Responsible for enforcing and clarifying judicial matters (e.g. Islamic court) and family and marriage-related issues. Also based in medieval Islam.
Public Relations; Diwan al-Alaqat al-Amma	?	Public relations (PR) department.
Agriculture; Diwan al-Zira'a	June 2014	Responsible for the regulation of agriculture and livestock. A RAND study revealed that harvests in IS territory were relatively normal, with commercial vehicle traffic increasing under the new administration. Only with the loss of territory and access to resources such as electricity did harvests begin to decay around 2016.
Fatwa and Investigation; Diwan al-Ifta' wa al-Buhuth	?	Responsible for issuing and clarifying fatwas. It also wrote and published text media used in training camps through its publishing body Maktabat al-Himma.
Soldiery; Diwan al-Jund	?	Responsible for the Army of the Islamic State and its management, training and distribution. It is sometimes referred to as the "Soldiers Department".
Media (Note: Also known as the Diwan of Central Media or Ministry of Information (Arabic: وزارة الإعلام).); Diwan al-I'lam al-Markazi	?	Responsible for the publishing bodies of IS, such as AlHayat Media Center, al-Furqan Media Foundation, Al-Bayan radio, Ajnad Foundation, Al-Naba, and Maktabat al-Himma. It is also in charge of the publication of magazines Dabiq, Dar al-Islam, Konstantiniyye, Istok, and later on Rumiyah. Additionally, it's the ministry in charge of translations.
Fay' and Ghana'im (Note: Literally the Diwan of Spoils and Plunder.); Diwan al-Fay' wa al-Ghana'im	?	Responsible for administering and distributing war spoils that come from battles.
Real Estate; Diwan al-'Aqarat wa al-Kharaj	?	Responsible for real estate seized from non-Muslims or abandoned by its original owners in order to accommodate regular and new fighters or civilians.

=== Regional administrative offices ===
Islamic State had created various regional offices during the period (2017–2019) to organize & direct its human and other resources & reviving its external operational capability.

The IS's offices set up at the centre to oversee the wilayats are:

Al-Siddiq office in Afghanistan, which “covers South Asia and, according to some UN Member States, Central Asia”;

Al-Karrar office in Somalia, which also covers Mozambique and the Democratic Republic of the Congo (DRC); and

Al-Furqan office in the Lake Chad basin, where the borders of Niger, Chad, Cameroon, and Nigeria converge. The Furqan office covers these states in North Africa and the broader western Sahel, overseeing ISGS/ISSP.

IS's other “three regional offices are low-functioning or moribund”, says the Monitoring Team, and these are:

Al-Anfal office in Libya, which covered “parts of northern Africa and the Sahel”;

The Umm al-Qura office “based in Yemen and … responsible for the Arabian Peninsula”; and

The Zu al-Nurayn office in the Sinai Peninsula “responsible for Egypt and the Sudan”.

ISWAP collects the zakat, a traditional Muslim tax and form of almsgiving which is used to provide for the poor. ISWAP's zakat has been featured in propaganda distributed by IS's newspaper, al-Naba. ISWAP's "Zakat Office" is known to operate fairly systematically and effectively, raising substantial funds to support both ISWAP as well as local civilians.

== Society ==
The territories in Iraq and Syria, which was occupied by the Islamic State and claimed as part of its self-dubbed "Caliphate" saw the creation of one of the most criminally active, totalitarian corrupt and violent regimes in modern times, and it ruled that territory until its defeat in 2019. IS murdered tens of thousands of civilians, kidnapped several thousand people, and forced hundreds of thousands of others to flee. It systematically committed torture, mass rapes, forced marriages, extreme acts of ethnic cleansing, mass murder, genocide, robbery, extortion, smuggling, slavery, kidnappings, and the use of child soldiers; in its implementation of strict interpretations of Sharia law which were based on ancient eighth-century methods, they carried out public "punishments" such as beheadings, crucifixions, beatings, mutilation and dismemberment, the stoning of both children and adults, and the live burning of people. IS members committed rape against tens of thousands of girls and women (mainly members of non-Sunni minority groups and families).

On 29 May, IS raided a village in Syria and at least 15 civilians were killed, including, according to Human Rights Watch, at least six children. A hospital in the area confirmed that it had received 15 bodies on the same day. The Syrian Observatory for Human Rights reported that on 1 June, a 102-year-old man was killed along with his whole family in a village in Hama province. According to Reuters, 1,878 people were killed in Syria by IS during the last six months of 2014, most of them civilians.

During its occupation of Mosul, IS implemented a sharia school curriculum which banned the teaching of art, music, national history, literature and Christianity. Although Charles Darwin's theory of evolution has never been taught in Iraqi schools, that subject was also banned from the school curriculum. Patriotic songs were declared blasphemous, and orders were given to remove certain pictures from school textbooks. Iraqi parents largely boycotted schools in which the new curriculum was introduced.

After capturing cities in Iraq, IS issued guidelines on how to wear clothes and veils. IS warned women in the city of Mosul to wear full-face veils or face severe punishment. A cleric told Reuters in Mosul that IS gunmen had ordered him to read out the warning in his mosque when worshippers gathered. IS ordered the faces of both male and female mannequins to be covered, in an order which also banned the use of naked mannequins. In Raqqa the group used its two battalions of female fighters in the city to enforce compliance by women with its strict laws on individual conduct.

IS released 16 notes labelled "Contract of the City", a set of rules aimed at civilians in Nineveh. One rule stipulated that women should stay at home and not go outside unless necessary. Another rule said that stealing would be punished by amputation. In addition to banning the sale and use of alcohol, IS banned the sale and use of cigarettes and hookah pipes. It also banned "music and songs in cars, at parties, in shops and in public, as well as photographs of people in shop windows".

According to The Economist, the group also adopted certain practices seen in Saudi Arabia, including the establishment of religious police to root out "vice" and enforce attendance at daily prayers, the widespread use of capital punishment, and the destruction of Christian churches and non-Sunni mosques or their conversion to other uses.

IS carried out executions on both men and women who were accused of various acts and found guilty of crimes against Islam such as sodomy, adultery, usage and possession of contraband, rape, blasphemy, witchcraft, renouncing Islam and murder. Before the accused were executed, their charges were read to them and the spectators. Executions take various forms, including stoning to death, crucifixions, beheadings, burning people alive, and throwing people from tall buildings. The Islamic State in Iraq frequently carried out mass executions in Mosul and Hawija.

== Human rights ==
The condition of human rights in the territory controlled by the Islamic State is considered to be among the worst in the world. In the areas they controlled the Islamic State would commit several genocides against local ethnic groups between 2014 and 2017. The Yazidi genocide was characterized by massacres, genocidal rape, and forced conversions to Islam. The Yazidis are a Kurdish-speaking people who are indigenous to Kurdistan who practice Yazidism, a monotheistic Iranian ethnoreligion derived from the Indo-Iranian tradition. IS fighters also have enslaved women and children, often for sexual slavery. the Iraqi Turkmen genocide began when IS captured Iraqi Turkmen lands in 2014 and it continued until IS lost all of their land in Iraq. In 2017, IS's persecution of Iraqi Turkmen was officially recognized as a genocide by the Parliament of Iraq, and in 2018, the sexual slavery of Iraqi Turkmen girls and women was recognized by the United Nations.

The Islamic State would persecute Christians in its territory in ways which involves the systematic mass murder. Persecution of Christian minorities climaxed following the Syrian civil war and later by its spillover but has since intensified further. Christians have been subjected to massacres, forced conversions, rape, sexual slavery, and the systematic destruction of their historical sites, churches and other places of worship.

The depopulation of Christians from the Middle East by the Islamic State as well as other organisations and governments has been formally recognised as an ongoing genocide by the United States, European Union, and United Kingdom. Christians remain the most persecuted religious group in the Middle East, and Christians in Iraq are “close to extinction”. According to estimates by the US State Department, the number of Christians in Iraq has fallen from 1.2 million 2011 to 120,000 in 2024, and the number in Syria from 1.5 million to 300,000, falls driven by persecution by Islamic terrorists.

Shia Muslims were also persecuted, since 2014. Persecutions have taken place in Iraq, Syria, and other parts of the world. Shia Muslims have been killed and otherwise persecuted by IS. On 12 June 2014, the Islamic State killed 1,700 unarmed Shia Iraqi Army cadet recruits in the Camp Speicher massacre. The Camp Speicher massacre is the deadliest act of terrorism in Iraq and the second-deadliest single act of terrorism in the world to date, surpassed only by the September 11 attacks. IS has also targeted Shia prisoners. According to witnesses, after the militant group took the city of Mosul, they divided the Sunni prisoners from the Shia prisoners. Up to 670 Shia prisoners were then taken to another location and executed. Kurdish officials in Erbil reported on the incident of Sunni and Shia prisoners being separated and Shia prisoners being killed after the Mosul prison fell to IS. In a special report released on 2 September 2014, Amnesty International described how IS had "systematically targeted non-Sunni Muslim communities, killing or abducting hundreds, possibly thousands, of individuals and forcing more than tens of thousands of Shias, Sunnis, along with other minorities to flee the areas it has captured since 10 June 2014". The most targeted Shia groups in Nineveh Governorate were Shia Turkmens and Shabaks.

=== Destruction of cultural heritage ===
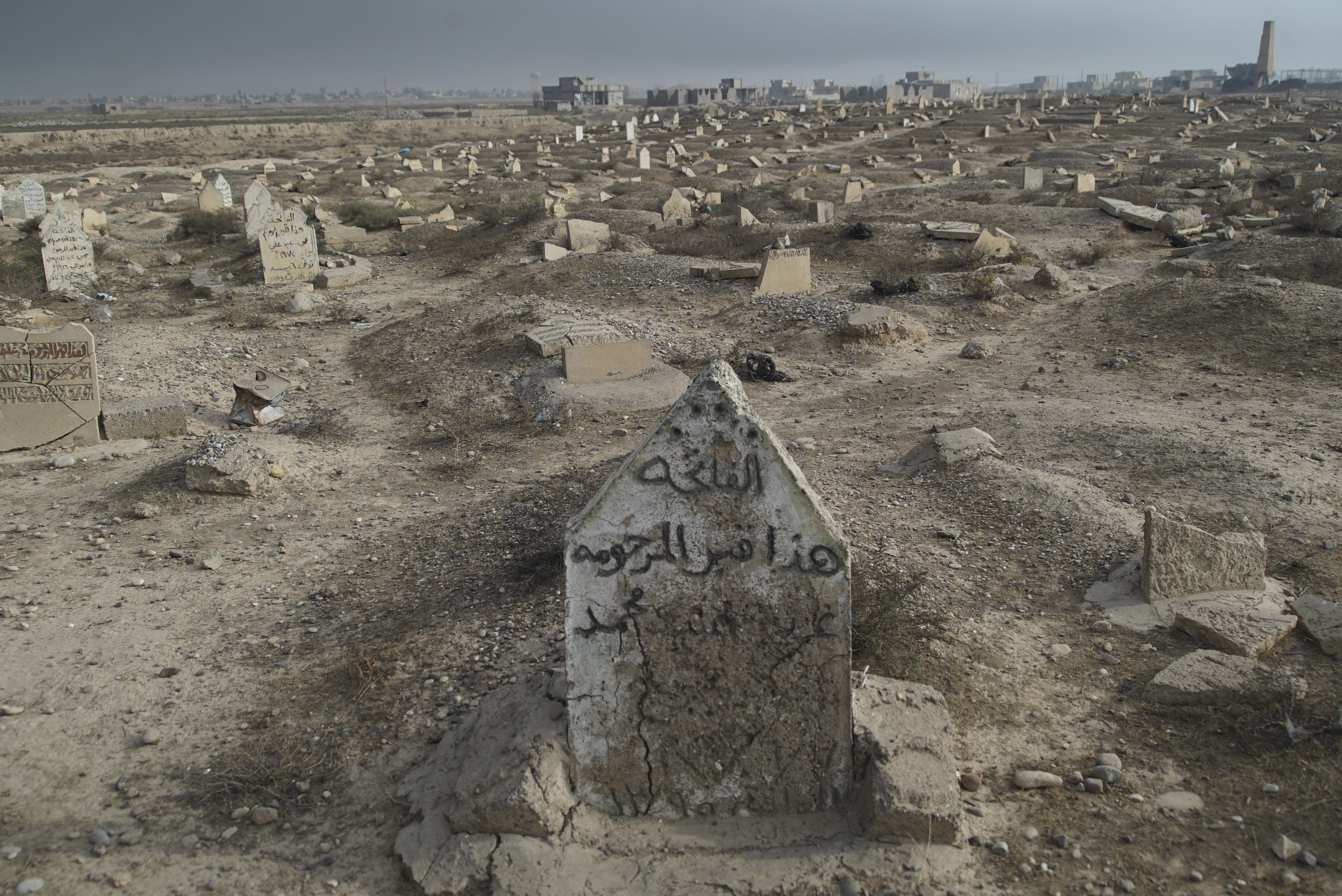
Cemetery in Qayyarah, Iraq, destroyed by the Islamic State (November 2016)

Since 2014, the Islamic State has destroyed cultural heritage on an unprecedented scale, primarily in Iraq and Syria, but also in Libya. These attacks and demolitions targeted a variety of ancient and medieval artifacts, museums, libraries, and places of worship, among other sites of importance to human history. Between June 2014 and February 2015, the Islamic State's Salafi jihadists plundered and destroyed at least 28 historic religious buildings in Mosul alone, with the most notable event being the 2014 destruction of Mosul Museum artifacts. Many of the valuables that were looted during these demolitions were used to bolster the economy of the Islamic State.

Along with antique Mesopotamian sites of significance, the Islamic State inflicted particularly cataclysmic levels of damage upon Christian (Assyrian, Armenian) heritage. It also destroyed Islamic sites that it declared to be in contradiction of that which is permissible in the Islamic State ideology, thus culminating in the destruction of Shia Islamic sites and non-compliant Sunni Islamic sites.

== See also ==
- Territory of Boko Haram
- Islamic Emirate of Afghanistan (1996–2001)
- Islamic Emirate of Yemen
- Islamic Emirate of Kunar
- Islamic Emirate of Badakhshan
- Islamic Emirate of Rafah
- Islamic Emirate of Kurdistan
- Caucasus Emirate
- Divisions of the world in Islam
