= Al-Hashimi al-Qurashi =

Al-Hashimi al-Qurashi is a surname. Notable people with the name include:

== Surname ==
- Abu Ibrahim al-Hashimi al-Qurashi (1976–2022), second Caliph of the Islamic State
- Abu al-Hasan al-Hashimi al-Qurashi (died 2022), third Caliph of the Islamic State
- Abu Hafs al-Hashimi al-Qurashi, fifth and current Caliph of the Islamic State
