= Global jihad =

Global jihad can refer to:

- Jihadism
- Offensive jihad, the use of armed conflict to expand the Islamic world
- Pan-Islamism, a political movement advocating a single Islamic state
- Worldwide Caliphate, a worldwide Islamic government for the entire world, advocated by Islamic extremists
