= Caliph of the Islamic State =

Leader of a Salafi jihadist militant organisation

- خَلِيفَة الدَّولةُ الإِسْلَامِيَّة
- Flag of the Islamic State
- Incumbent; Abu Hafs al-Hashimi al-Qurashi since 3 August 2023
- Type: Leader
- Appointer: Shura Council of the Islamic State
- Precursor: Emir of the Islamic State of Iraq and the Levant
- Formation: 29 June 2014
- First holder: Abu Bakr al-Baghdadi
- Deputy: Deputy Caliph of the Islamic State

The Caliph of the Islamic State is the leader of the Islamic State, a transnational Salafi jihadist militant organisation and internationally unrecognized quasi-state, and the head of state and government of the territory of the Islamic State.

== Background ==
On 29 June 2014, the Islamic State of Iraq and Levant proclaimed the "return of the Islamic Caliphate" and renamed itself to the Islamic State, with Abu Bakr al-Baghdadi as its first Caliph. The Caliphate at its territorial peak controlled 12 million people with territories in various countries, notably Iraq, Syria and Nigeria.

=== Dispute ===
The Islamic State describes itself as a caliphate and its leader as a caliph, however, this claim is not accepted by the vast majority of Muslims, and is disputed by most Muslim scholars and authors.

== List of caliphs ==
No.	Portrait	Name (Birth–Death)	Reigned from	Reigned until
1		Abu Bakr al-Baghdadi (1971–2019)	29 June 2014	27 October 2019
Vacant (27 – 31 October 2019)
2		Abu Ibrahim al-Hashimi al-Qurashi (1976–2022)	31 October 2019	3 February 2022
Vacant (3 – 4 February 2022)
3		Abu al-Hasan al-Hashimi al-Qurashi (?–2022)	4 February 2022	15 October 2022
Vacant (15 October – 30 November 2022)
4		Abu al-Hussein al-Husseini al-Qurashi (?–2023)	30 November 2022	29 April 2023
Vacant (29 April – 3 August 2023)
5		Abu Hafs al-Hashimi al-Qurashi (born ?)	3 August 2023	Incumbent

== See also ==
- List of leaders of the Islamic State
