= Timeline of the Iraqi insurgency (2026) =

This is a timeline of events during the Iraqi insurgency (2017–present) in 2026.

== Timeline ==
=== February ===
- February 6:
  - The Iraqi Air Force carries out strikes on IS hideouts near Hatra in northern Nineveh Governorate, Iraq, using F-16 fighter jets, killing four militants.
  - An Islamic State suicide bomber detonates explosives at a hideout in Al-Qa'im District, Iraq, during an attempted arrest, killing himself and injuring two security officers.

=== March ===
- March 20 – Polish defence minister Władysław Kosiniak-Kamysz announces the withdrawal of Polish Armed Forces from Iraq, stationed there as part of the CJTF–OIR joint task force against the Islamic State, citing the regional threat from Iran.

=== May ===
- May 4:
  - The Islamic State – Iraq Province claimed an attack against the Iraqi military, its first claimed attack in 2026. No casualties reported.
  - Islamic State – Iraq Province detonated an IED on an Iraqi patrol near the Tigris river, which lead to a Humvee being disabled, and one Iraqi soldier being injured.

=== June ===
- June 2 – Popular Mobilization Forces in Nineveh announce that three Islamic State suspects have been killed during a military operation in the Al-Ba'aj District.

=== July ===
- 4 July – In Kirkuk, Iraq, security forces ambush and kill a suspected IS member.
- 19 July – In Iraq, two IS militants are captured in Kirkuk.
- 21 July – The Iraqi military say that they have destroyed six IS hideouts in Kirkuk, Iraq.
- 28 July – Security forces arrested an IS commander.
- 29 July – Six IS members, including the self-proclaimed "Governor of Anbar" were sentenced to death by hanging.

=== August ===
- 10 August – In Iraq, the Iraqi Air Force launched airstrikes and destroyed eight IS hideouts in Kirkuk.
- 12 August – Iraqi officials announced that US forces will fully withdraw from Iraq on September 30, 2026.
- 15 August – Three IS members were arrested in Iraq, two in Diyala Governorate and one in Al-Anbar Governorate.
- 17 August – In Kirkuk, Iraq, the Iraqi Air Force claims to have destroyed 5 IS hideouts.
- 18 August – In Sulaymaniyah, Kurdistan Region, Iraq, seven members of IS are arrested.
- 19 August – Two members of IS are arrested in Mosul and Saladin Governorate, Iraq.
- 23 August – In Saladin Governorate, Iraq the Popular Mobilization Forces successfully repelled an attack by IS.

=== September ===
- 9 September – In Wadi al-Shai, Saladin Governorate, Iraq, the Iraqi Air Force carried out 4 airstrikes on IS hideouts. After the strikes, Iraqi troops launched a search operation in the area.
- 11 September – In Kirkuk, Iraq, two IS militants are killed in an airstrike.
- 13 September – In Kurdistan Region, Iraq, 22 members of IS, including an "emir" were arrested.
- 20 September – In Kirkuk, Iraq, an IS mortar attack on Al-Malha village killed a woman and wounded several civilians.
- 27 September:
  - In Kirkuk, Iraq, a security operation was carried out against 3 people affiliated with IS, killing 2 people and arresting one.
  - In Sulaymaniyah Governorate, Iraq, three IS members are arrested.
- 30 September – The United States fully withdraws from Iraq, marking the end of Operation Inherent Resolve in Iraq.

=== October ===
- 5 October – IS militants launched a sniper attack on Iraqi Federal Police, in Hawija, southwest of Kirkuk, killing one policeman and wounding four others. The attack is the first reported attack since the United States withdrew from Iraq on 30 September.
- 13 October - Airstrikes kill two members of IS in Wadi Zghaitoun, Kirkuk Governorate.

=== November ===
- November 5:
  - Iraqi Counter Terrorism Service officials announce the arrest an unnamed suspected local cell member of IS in Kirkuk Governorate.
  - Two unidentified rifle-wielding masked gunmen wearing AK chest rigs, attacked a gas station in Daraman, Kirkuk Governorate, killing a security guard and injuring three others.
- 11 November:
  - In Kirkuk Governorate, Iraqi Airforce launch an airstrike on a tunnel system operated by three members of IS. No casualties were reported.
  - Iraqi Military Intelligence Directorate officials announce the demolition of three IS safehouses in Kirkuk Governorate, seizing logistical equipment, a rifle, and 30 rounds of ammunition.
- 13 November - Three members of IS are killed by an Iraqi Airforce strike after armed clashes occurred near Altun Kupri, Kirkuk Governorate. One IS member is also arrested.
- 15 November - Members of PMF's 44th brigade are attacked by suspected IS operatives near Hatra, Nineveh, resulting in search operations being launched by the Iraqi army. No casualties were reported.
