= Diwan of Education and Teaching of the Islamic State =

- Diwan of Education and Teaching of Islamic State
- ديوان التربية والتعليم في الدولة الإسلامية
- Formation: October 2013 (Unofficially); September 2014 (Officially)
- Dissolved: 2017 (In Iraq and Syria)
- Type: Governmental
- Headquarters: Raqqa, Syria
- Region served: Main: Iraq; Syria; Other: Afghanistan; Nigeria
- Services: Education
- Official language: Arabic
- Affiliations: Islamic State

Diwan of Education and Teaching of the Islamic State (Arabic: ديوان التربية والتعليم في الدولة الإسلامية, romanized: Dīwān al-Tarbiyah wa-al-taʻlīm fī al-dawlah al-Islāmīyah), also known as just the Diwan of Education (Arabic: ديوان التربية, romanized: Dīwān al-Tarbiyah) was the education ministry of the Islamic State for elementary schools, middle schools, high schools, and universities under the territory of the Islamic State.

== History ==
The first schools to implement Islamic State teaching was in October 2013 after the Islamic State of Iraq seized territory in Raqqa where a curriculum was made for elementary schools and for children aged seven to 11 years old, many pictures have surfaced of books containing the rules of Islamic manners, the fundamental concepts of tawhid, and the Arabic language where as originally the Islamic State of Iraq neglected the studies of mathematics, science, art and music, though with music being completely banned due to the Islamic attitude towards music being haram. The Diwan (Ministry) was established in 2014 after the large campaigns done to expand the Islamic States' territory throughout Iraq and Syria, the Islamic State created this ministry as a way to regulate teaching and studies done by students in all grades and to teach Islamic doctrines and ideologies of the Islamic State, and by September 2014 a revised curriculum was spread throughout the territory the Islamic State controlled after the formation of the Committee for the Development of Curricula and Textbooks after holding an open meeting for the teachers and instructors who supported the Islamic State. Initially, the first 50 committee members, organized by subject, struggled to keep pace, resulting in the expansion of each group. Eventually, nearly 400 individuals—including teacher-authors, inspector-editors, secretaries, research assistants, modelers, graphic artists, computer specialists, and others—were contributing to the committee. This group consisted of both volunteers and those compelled to participate under duress. Most members were dedicated to a single subject group. Each group's work was overseen by a representative from the ministry, and the entire committee's output was ultimately placed under the authority of Dhu al-Qarnayn, the Islamic State's minister.

=== Curriculum ===
Many of the new curriculum established by the Diwan always involved a religious element of Islam into its textbooks, where it was found to have over 30 textbooks that were instituted into it that taught a singular corpus of study never seen before and became the central element in the "jihadist resistance" against American occupation and the new Shia government installed by the Americans in Iraq. Many of these studies done by students under the Diwan involve jihad and Islam and it becomes a key part in the learning by students of it. Members of the al-Khansaa brigade teach girls and women in schools due to the gender norms under the Islamic State, it is forbidden to teach girls as a teacher if you are male and it is forbidden to teach boys as a teacher if you're a female. This curriculum was established and spread to one third of all children and university students living under the Islamic State.

==== Mathematics ====
Learning mathematics under the Diwan involved the textbooks to contain references to Islamic extremist topics, with the arithmetic calculations often pertaining war-related topics, for example, arithmetic exercises asked students to calculate the number of explosives a factory can produce in a particular Islamic State-controlled wilayah or the number of Shi'ite Muslims or 'unbelievers' (Kuffar) that can be killed by a car suicide-bomber. There were images of Kalashnikovs, and the plus sign (+) was abolished as it was claimed it refers to the Christian cross; this is similar to the common use in Israel of ﬩ as an alternative plus sign on the same religious basis.

==== Science ====
Science was heavily regulated in a teaching manner due to some scientific lessons going against what the Quran and Hadith state, Abu Bakr al-Baghdadi explicitly stated for the theory of evolution by Charles Darwin be banned in teaching even though it was never taught in the past.

==== Computer programming ====
In the curriculum of the Diwan, computer programming is one of the major parts of the curriculum where, among the complementary programs, the Islamic State included a curriculum for programming using the Scratch software and also the use of creating computer programs and ethical hacking.

==== Physical education ====
The physical education curriculum is basic to western world's standards, with the pedagogy didactic's being Swedish gymnastics and the only learning and assessment being 17 lessons in the manual (though there's no physical activity for lesson number 7), the teacher being allowed to add activities not listed, and 3 repetitive sessions for each lesson, with only 45 minutes allowed.

==== Others ====
Many other subjects including music, drawing, sports (excluding physical education), and philosophy were outlawed, with many libraries that hosted non-Islamic books were set on fire and destroyed.
