= The Islamic State (film) =

- Directed by: Medyan Dairieh
- Produced by: Shane Smith; Medyan Dairieh
- Narrated by: Ben Anderson
- Cinematography: Medyan Dairieh
- Edited by: Evelyn Franks; Andy Hayward; Sam Sapin; Paula Salhany; Rich Lowe
- Distributed by: Vice Media (Vice News)
- Release date: 20 August 2014
- Running time: 42:32
- Country: Syria
- Language: English

The Islamic State is a documentary created by VICE News in 2014 during the rise of the Islamic State and documented by Vice News correspondent Medyan Dairieh while he was visiting the territory of the Islamic State for 3 weeks in which he explored areas of Raqqa with the hisbah (Islamic State police) and explored the front lines of Syria. A trailer called "From ISIS to the Islamic State" was released on August 11, 2014.

== Film and plot ==
The correspondent, Medyan Dairieh, was spending three weeks in the territory of the Islamic State in Raqqa from May to June 2014, where he explored Raqqa up to the Euphrates river in which he talked to the members of the Islamic State, military of the Islamic State, and civilians under the rule of the Islamic State. These were considered planned trips and Dairieh was there with the permission of the Islamic State which was considered surprising by many.

One of the members of the Islamic State that was a guide to the Euphrates was Islamic State press officer Abu Mosa, who gained attention after being filmed by VICE News. Through their guide on the banks of the Euphrates, a propaganda vehicle that was used in propaganda by the Islamic State showed up and revealed how kids are used in the Islamic State, in the various clips shown in the documentary, the kids, teenagers to children, showed love for the Islamic State and the so-called caliph, Abu Bakr al-Baghdadi. During these interviews near the Euphrates, they talked about how the inside of the Islamic State worked with child recruitment, where kids under the age of 15 were sent to Sharia camp, an organized learning environment about Islam, Salafism, and Jihadism, and kids above the age of 15 were sent to military camps to learn about fighting and basic weapons training, specifically with the AK-47.

The driver of the propaganda van was an Australian-born Jihadist named Khaled Sharrouf who joined ISIS (before it was the Islamic State) in December of 2013, he was interviewed with his son where he pressured his son to say pro-ISIS answers to the interviewer. The van was called the "preaching van" which espoused Qu'ran verses from the megaphones on top and also preached Wahhabi ideologies. Those who interviewed VICE in the area of Raqqa about the children stated that the children were a "generation of Jihad" and loved the so-called caliphate. Through the tour of Raqqa, they talked about their hatred for Turkey, especially for cutting off the dam to Raqqa and Mosul of the Euphrates, the Free Syrian Army, and Al-Nusra Front.

Then he explored areas of Raqqa with the hisbah (Islamic State police), whose patrol leader was Abu Obida, who explained his purpose to establish the caliphate in the way of the Prophet Mohammed, and ordered traders to remove a poster showing infidels and a man to change the fabric on his wife's veil.

== Reception and criticism ==
The Washington Post called the documentary 'impressive' in an article released by them. Business Insider called the documentary amazing and talked about how it showed the violence and the recruitment by the Islamic State. The legality of how VICE News gained access and the trust of the Islamic State was heavily questioned and criticized due to the fact it can be seen as illegal.

=== Awards ===
In 2014, the documentary won VICE News a Peabody Award. VICE News was one of the multiple news, radio and podcast winners for 2014. The winners were released on April 20, 2015.
