= Hisbah of the Islamic State =

Hisbah Diwan
- ديوان الحسبة
- Formation: 2014
- Dissolved: 2017 (in Iraq and Syria)
- Region served: Iraq and Syria and other territories (2014—2017); Mainly West Africa (2017—Present)
- Methods: Violence, Coercion, Torture
- Parent organization: Islamic State
- Subsidiaries: Al-Khansaa Brigade

The Hisbah of the Islamic State (Arabic: الحسبة التابعة لتنظيم الدولة الإسلامية, romanized: al-Ḥisbah al-tābiʻah li-tanẓīm al-dawlah al-Islāmīyah), also known under the official name Hisbah Diwan (Arabic: ديوان الحسبة, romanized: Dīwān al-ḥisbah, lit. 'Hisbah Office'), is the police force of the Islamic State in localized territory under the Islamic duty "Enjoining good and forbidding wrong" which is their slogan.

== History ==
After the Islamic State's declaration of a caliphate and subsequent control of Raqqa in Syria and Mosul in Iraq, the Islamic State established the Hisbah Diwan, alongside the Al-Khansaa Brigade for women's enforcement of modesty and faith, in order to enforce Islamic morals and sharia in the public. The Hisbah Diwan was in almost every single town/city in which the Islamic State controlled in Iraq and Syria, this allowed for means for civilians to interact with them and for them to go to both local and jurisdictional sharia courts. The Hisbah Diwan was organized hierarchically, with a central office overseeing city-level units. Officers were responsible for enforcing dress codes, religious observance, and market regulations. These religious observances mostly included the banning and destruction of forbidden items (alcohol, drugs, cigarettes, music instruments) and the destruction of what they deemed to be idols. The level that the Hisbah Diwan worked at was under the Sharia Shura of the Islamic State, outside of the Military Shura in which fighting units resided, the Sharia Shura is where most if not all Diwans were regulated and created.

=== Methods of enforcement ===
The Hisbah Diwan primarily used tactics of fear and coercion to enforce the Islamic State's interpretation of sharia law, including acts of torture and violence. For crimes of smoking which was common in the territory of the Islamic State, punishments included fines, imprisonment, and public flogging. Due to the amount of imprisoned in Raqqa, the Hisbah created large detention centers in nearby areas, including near the Al-Tabqa Dam, where the imprisoned included political prisoners and petty thieves. The hisbah has also been known to carry out extrajudicial executions against what they deem to be violators of Sharia law. While enforcing the local law and sharia under their interpretation, the Hisbah wear tradition Afghan clothing, specifically the thawb style, and patrol areas where it's been reported by eyewitnesses, they harass women and beat passersby. These patrols would normally travel around on foot or with vehicles, carrying AK-47s or similar weaponry. The Hisbah also enforced the dismantlement of what they viewed as shirk and attempted to force an ideal of tawhid, this included the praise of Jesus in Christianity to the destruction of ancient artifacts in Mosul and Palmyra.

The Hisbah Diwan police normally during prayer times would patrol the city before and force anyone who isn't leaving to go to a mosque to go to prayer, sometimes forcefully.

==== Crimes ====
While the Hisbah Diwan is mostly for enforcement, there have been reports of Hisbah police of the Islamic State participating in torture and rape of women, specifically during the Yazidi genocide, alongside other soldiers a part of the Islamic State. The Hisbah has also been accused of facilitating crimes against the United Nations' Universal Declaration of human rights and Geneva Conventions and Additional Protocols by recruiting child soldiers and renouncing all citizenship, even without legal proceedings, affectively forcing members to be stateless citizens.

=== Dissolution ===
After most of the Islamic State's territory was dismantled or taken control of by other forces, in 2017, the Hisbah dismantled themselves and lost most of their power and fled or joined the military of the Islamic State. Despite this, the Hisbah Diwan is still active in areas of Africa including the West African Province and Sahel Province.

== In media ==
The Hisbah Diwan has been mentioned in several works of the Islamic State including officially published videos and magazines made by the Islamic State's official media outlet Al-Hayat Media Center, Dabiq. The Vice News documentary The Islamic State talked with the head of the hisbah at the time in Raqqa, Syria, in July 2014 which allowed them to show their enforcement policies and methods.

== See also ==
- Al-Khansaa Brigade
- Enjoining good and forbidding wrong
- Committee for the Promotion of Virtue and the Prevention of Vice (Saudi Arabia)
