= Islamic State – Lebanon Province =

Branch of the Islamic State in Lebanon

- الدولة الإسلامية – ولاية لبنان
- Dates active: 2015 – present
- Active regions: Lebanon
- Ideology: Islamic Statism
- Size: Unknown
- Part of: Islamic State

The Islamic State – Lebanon Province (Arabic: الدولة الإسلامية – ولاية لبنان, romanized: ad-Dawla al-Islāmiyya – Wilāyat Lubnān) is a branch of the Islamic State operating in Lebanon.

== Attacks ==
On 12 November 2015, the Islamic State claimed responsibility for the 2015 Beirut bombings, killing 43 people.

On 8 December 2022, the Islamic State releases photos showing militants in Lebanon pledging allegiance to Abu al-Hussein al-Husseini al-Qurashi.

On 5 June 2024, a shooting takes place in the US embassy in Beirut. No deaths happened, but two people are injured, including the perpetrator. A photo shows a bloodied man wearing a vest with the Arabic "الدولة الإسلامية" and the English initials "I" and "S".
