= Abu Mosa (press officer) =

- Abu Mosa in the VICE News video in 2014
- Died: 22 August 2014 Tabqa, Raqqa Governorate
- Cause of death: Airstrike by the Syrian Air Force
- Allegiance: Islamic State
- Known for: Press officer of the Islamic State and starring in the Vice News documentary on YouTube
- Conflicts: Syrian civil war: Battle of Tabqa Airbase †

Abu Mosa (presumably a nom de guerre, real name unknown) was a press officer for the Islamic State. In a documentary video made by Vice News reporter Medyan Daireh, he threatened the US and said "we will raise the flag of Allah in the White House". He also threatened to "liberate Istanbul".

He was killed by an air strike on 22 August 2014 by the Syrian army in an attack for al-Tabqa air base in Raqqa Governorate during the Syrian Civil War. It was confirmed by U.S. Department of State.
