= Abu Hamza Al-Qurashi =

Spokesman for the Islamic State (died 2021)

Abu Hamza al-Qurashi
- أبو حمزة القريشي

Spokesman of the Islamic State
- In office 31 October 2019 – 7 November 2021
- Preceded by: Abul-Hasan al-Muhajir
- Succeeded by: Abu Omar al-Muhajir

Personal details
- Born: Hussam al-Sayid حسام السيد
- Died: 7 November 2021 Jarabulus, Syria
- Cause of death: Airstrike

Military service
- Allegiance: Islamic State

Hussam al-Sayid (Arabic: حسام السيد), known by his nom de guerre Abu Hamza al-Qurashi (Arabic: أبو حمزة القرشي), (died November 2021) was an Iraqi who served as the third spokesman for the Islamic State (IS) from 2019 until his death in November 2021.

Before becoming the spokesman for the Islamic State, Abu Hamza al-Qurashi served as a munshid ( religious singer) for the Islamic State's Ajnad media from 2015 to 2019, operating under the hierarchy name Abu Ibrahim al-Baghdadi. His intro voice was used in speeches of Al-Furqan audios and he was also Arabic voice of some of Al-Hayat media videos. During this time, he also served under the previous Islamic State spokesman, Abul-Hasan al-Muhajir.

Al-Qurashi's role as a spokesman gave him a prominent position within the Islamic State, allowing him to disseminate the group's propaganda messages and motivate fighters. He was known for his fiery speeches and reportedly lived working in the spice market in an area near the Ayn al-Bayda camp in the Jarablus region, where he was known as Abu Abdo al-Hamwi among local Islamic State members.

His speeches included:

- “And Whosoever Fulfills What He has Covenanted with Allah, He will Bestow on Him a Great Reward”; 31 October 2019
- “God brought destruction on them, and similar (fate) avails the disbelievers”; 27 January 2020
- “And the disbelievers will know for whom is the final home“; 28 May 2020
- “So Relate the Stories That Perhaps They Will Give Thought”; 18 October 2020
- “And you will be superior if you are indeed believers”; 22 June 2021

== Death ==
On 7 November 2021, Syrian opposition Telegram channels circulated an image of a deceased individual, killed in Jarabulus by missile strike, claiming that local forces had recognized the body as Abu Hamza al-Qurashi. While local sources and conflict monitoring websites speculated at the time that he had been killed in November 2021, Islamic State official media did not immediately acknowledge the loss.

On 10 March 2022, ISIS officially announced the death of Abu Hamza al-Qurashi alongside its leader, Abu Ibrahim al-Hashimi al-Qurashi, stating that both had been killed "in recent days". Analysts suggest the group delayed the announcement of his November 2021 death to maintain organizational stability until the caliph himself was killed.
