= Diwan al-Amn =

Islamic State intelligence apparatus

- Arabic: ديوان الأمن
- Logo of Diwan al-Amn in Wilāyat Nīnawā

Agency overview
- Preceding agency: AQI Amniyat

Diwan al-Amn (Arabic: ديوان الأمن, “Security Bureau” or “Office of Security”) is the intelligence and security apparatus of the Islamic State. The organization operates within the framework of the Islamic State's administrative structure, with the goal of maintaining internal security and suppressing dissent.

== History and background ==
The Islamic State group emerged in 2006 from the remnants of Al-Qaeda in Iraq. In 2014, the group's leader, Abu Bakr al-Baghdadi, declared the establishment of a caliphate, or Islamic state, in parts of Iraq and Syria under the group's control. Diwan al-Amn was established to consolidate control over the territories the group had seized and maintain security within them.

== Organization ==
Diwan al-Amn is led by an Emir who reports directly to the Islamic State's overall leader, currently believed to be Abu Hafs al-Hashimi al-Qurashi. The director oversees several branches responsible for different aspects of security, including intelligence gathering, counterintelligence, surveillance, and investigations.

== Structure ==
Diwan al-Amn was divided into several units, including:

- Internal Security: responsible for maintaining security within IS-held territories and carrying out counter-intelligence operations against potential threats.
- Intelligence: responsible for gathering information about potential targets, including individuals and groups that posed a threat to the group's operations.
- Counter-Terrorism: responsible for carrying out operations against rival groups and individuals.
- Prisons: responsible for managing the group's detention facilities and carrying out interrogations of prisoners.
- Media: responsible for producing and distributing IS propaganda, including videos that depicted the group's operations and presented a distorted image of life under its rule.

== Activities ==
Diwan al-Amn is responsible for maintaining security and order within the Islamic State's territories. Its activities include monitoring the population for signs of dissent or opposition, investigating suspected traitors or informants, and suppressing any form of resistance or rebellion.

Diwan al-Amn carried out a range of activities in support of IS's goals. These included:

- Assassinations: Diwan al-Amn was responsible for carrying out assassinations of individuals deemed to be threats to the group, including political and religious leaders, as well as members of rival groups.
- Security Operations: The department carried out security operations, including checkpoints and raids, in order to maintain control over areas under IS control.
- Propaganda: Diwan al-Amn played a key role in producing and distributing propaganda videos that depicted the group's operations and presented a distorted image of life under its rule.

The organization has also been involved in carrying out attacks against the group's enemies, both inside and outside the Islamic State's territories. It has been implicated in several high-profile terrorist attacks, including the November 2015 Paris attacks, which killed 130 people, and the March 2016 Brussels bombings, which killed 32 people.

== Criticism and controversy ==
The Islamic State group's brutal tactics, including widespread violence against civilians and the use of public executions, have drawn widespread condemnation from the international community. Diwan al-Amn has been implicated in numerous human rights violations, including torture, arbitrary detention, and extrajudicial killings.

The group's indiscriminate targeting of civilians and non-combatants has been described as constituting war crimes and crimes against humanity by international human rights organizations.
