= Islamic State – Saudi Arabia Province =

Branch of the Islamic State

Islamic State Saudi Arabia Province
- الدولة الإسلامية – ولاية المملكة العربية السعودية
- The logo of the Islamic State's Najd Province
- Other name: Najd Province; Wilayat Haramayn
- Dates active: 13 November 2014 – unknown
- Ideology: Islamic Statism
- Size: Unknown
- Part of: Islamic State

The Islamic State – Saudi Arabia Province (IS–SAP; Arabic: الدولة الإسلامية – ولاية المملكة العربية السعودية, romanized: al-Dawlat al-'Islamiat – Wilayat al-Mamlakat al-Earabiat al-Sueudia), referred to by the Islamic State as its Province of the Two Holy Mosques (Arabic: ولاية الحرمين, romanized: Wilayat al-Haramayn) (Note: Both the Islamic State and al-Qaeda have referred to the territory of Saudi Arabia as the 'Land of the Two Holy Mosques'. The Arabic term 'al-Haramayn' serves as the dual (2) plural of 'al-Haram' (the forbidden [mosque]). These two mosques, Masjid al-Haram and the Prophet's Mosque are located in Islam's two holiest cities, Mecca and Medina, respectively. Insurgent groups use this wording to avoid implicit recognition of either the current government (the Kingdom of Saudi Arabia) or the eponymous founding dynasty (the House of Saud), which these groups condemn as apostates and illegitimate authorities.) and self-described as Najd Province (Arabic: ولاية النجد, romanized: Wilayat an-Najd), was a branch of the militant Islamist group Islamic State (IS), active in Saudi Arabia. The group, formed on 13 November 2014, conducted a number of attacks in the Kingdom of Saudi Arabia between November 2014 and March 2017.

== Organization ==
There are three provinces in Saudi Arabia. They are named after the regions in Saudi Arabia.

Logo	Name	Native Name	Area	Citation
	Wilayah al-Hijaz	ولاية الحجاز	in the Hejaz region in western Saudi Arabia	
	Wilayah Najd	ولاية نجد	in the Najd region in central Saudi Arabia and formerly the Eastern Province	
	Wilayah al-Bahrain	ولاية البحرين	in the Eastern Province of Saudi Arabia	

== Operations ==
IS-SAP was announced on 13 November 2014 by the Islamic State along with six other new wilayat (provinces): Wilayat al-Jazir (Algeria); Wilayats al-Barqah, al-Tarabulus, and al-Fizan (Libya), Wilayat Sinai (Sinai Peninsula), and Wilayat al-Yaman (Yemen). The new province, Wilayat al-Haramayn, was named after the Arabic dual plural of haram (forbidden) referring to the two holies sites in Islam, Mecca and Medina, in the Kingdom of Saudi Arabia. The recorded announcement by the Islamic State's then-top leader (caliph), Abu Bakr al-Baghdadi, called for fighters in Saudi Arabia to begin operations against the country which had been one of the first Arab countries to join the United States-led anti-ISIS coalition (Operation Inherent Resolve) in Iraq and Syria where the group declared its caliphate in 2014. In his call to arms, al-Baghdadi pronounced "O sons of al-Haramayn... the serpent's head and the stronghold of the disease are there draw your swords and divorce life, because there should be no security for the Saloul." Saloul was a derogatory term for the rulers of Saudi Arabia.

=== Attacks ===
Attacks attributed to and claimed by IS–SAP, many of which occurred in the Kingdom's capital, Riyadh, have primarily targeted crowded Shia mosques, Saudi police and security forces, and foreign citizens. Recorded attacks attributed to the group have killed approximately 50 and injured more than 78 others.

Attacks linked to Islamic State – Saudi Arabia Province
Date	Article	Location	Description	Dead	Injured
3 November 2014	None	Al-Ahsa, Eastern Province	Three masked attackers, led by Abdullah bin Saeed al-Sarhan and believed to be IS, fired their weapons into a crowd departing a Shia husseiniya the evening before the Shia holiday of Ashura.	5	9
22 November 2014	None	Riyadh City, Riyadh Province	Danish citizen Thomas Høpner was shot in a drive-by shooting while driving from work. Høpner was taken to a hospital and stabilized. IS released a video of the attack and claimed responsibility nine days later.	0	1
8 April 2015	None	Riyadh City, Riyadh Province	IS militants Yazeed Mohammad Abdulrahman Abu Nayyan and Nawaf bin Sarif Samir al-Enazy killed two Saudi policemen in a drive-by shooting as the two were on patrol. Abu Nayyan confessed to IS recruitment and direction.	2	0
22 May 2015	Qatif and Dammam mosque bombings	Qatif, Eastern Province	Suicide bomber Abu 'Ammar al-Najdi detonated a suicide bomb during Friday prayers at a Shia mosque. IS claimed responsibility.	21	50+
29 May 2015	Qatif and Dammam mosque bombings	Dammam, Eastern Province	An attacker, disguised as a woman, attempted to enter the women's section of the Imam Hussein mosque, the city's only Shia mosque. After being stopped at a security checkpoint setup outside, the attacker detonated a suicide vest. IS claimed responsibility.	4	4
3 July 2015	None	Taif, Mecca Province	Four IS militants opened fire on a police officer sent to arrest the militants. Three suspects were detained along with IS flags and silencers. One militant, Youssef Abdellatif Shabab al-Ghamdi escaped.	1	0
16 July 2015	None	Riyadh City, Riyadh Province	On the last day of the Islamic holy month of Ramadan, a driver detonated a suicidal car bomb after a routine stop at a police checkpoint. IS claimed responsibility.	0	2
6 August 2015	2015 Abha mosque bombing	Abha, Asir Province	A suicide bomber detonated an explosive belt inside a Saudi special forces camp mosque near the Saudi border with Yemen. Twelve of the dead were members of a special tactics unit and three were base workers. IS was believed to be responsible.	15	9
27 June 2016	None	Riyadh City, Riyadh Province	Two twin brothers, Khalid and Saleh al-Areeni, attacked their family reportedly in a clash over their joining of IS. After chasing their younger brother to the rooftop and stabbing him, the brothers stabbed their father and mother. The mother, 67-years-old, died on site.	1	2
7 January 2017	None	Riyadh City, Riyadh Province	Police raiding a residential building to capture IS fighters preparing explosives for an attack were engaged in a firefight with two IS fighters. The fighters, Taie bin Salem bin Yaslam al-Saya'ari and Talal bin Samran Al-Saedi, wearing suicide belts, took a civilian hostage before being killed.	0	1
8 March 2017	None	Riyadh City, Riyadh Province	Saudi police officers were dispatched to an apartment where witnesses reported an individual "flaunting his support" for IS. The IS sympathizer reportedly waived his firearm and resisted arrest and was shot dead by police.	0	0

== See also ==
- Islamic State
- List of terrorist incidents linked to the Islamic State
- Islamic State – Khorasan Province
- Islamic State – West Africa Province
