= Abu Hudhayfah al-Ansari =

Spokesperson of the Islamic State 2023–2026

- أبو حذيفة الأنصاري

5th Spokesman of the Islamic State
- In office 3 August 2023 – 1 September 2026
- Preceded by: Abu Omar al-Muhajir (POW)

Personal details
- Born: 15 March 1985
- Died: 1 September 2026 (aged 41)
- Religion: Sunni Islam
- Military career
- Allegiance: Islamic State
- Conflicts: War on terror: War against the Islamic State

Abu Hudhayfah al-Ansari (Arabic: أبو حذيفة الأنصاري, romanized: ʾAbū Ḥudhayfah al-Anṣārī) was nom de guerre of a man acting as the spokesman of the Islamic State (IS) from 2023 until his alleged death in 2026. Based in Yemen, he is reported by local sources to have been a Yemeni national from Radfan district, Lahij Governorate whose real name was Mithaq Thabit Haitham Al-Radfani.

Abu Hudhayfah al-Ansari was announced as the spokesman in a speech released by Al-Furqan Foundation media in August 2023. He replaced Abu Omar al-Muhajir as the spokesman of the Islamic State, who was arrested by Tahrir al-Sham. He was reportedly killed in a joint operation by the Yemeni Armed Forces and the Saudi-led coalition forces in Yemen in early September 2026,

== Islamic State spokesman ==
In August 2023, Abu Hudhayfah al-Ansari announced the killing of the fourth Islamic State Caliph, Abu al-Hussein al-Husseini al-Qurashi, announcing Abu Hafs al-Hashimi al-Qurashi as his successor, and threatened to increase attacks after U.S. withdrawal. Nothing was known yet about the identity of Abu Hudhayfah. In August 2023, Mina Al-Lami, a Jihadist specialist for BBC Monitoring, speculated on Twitter that Abu Hudhayfah is possibly an Iraqi. In January 2024, Abu Hudayfah released an audio discussing the Gaza war.

In February 2026, Abu Hudayfah urged IS militants in Syria to fight the new Syrian government.

== Reported death ==
On 1 September 2026, the government of Yemen announced that al-Ansari had been killed earlier that day in a joint operation carried out by the 22nd Brigade of Yemen's counterterrorism forces and the Saudi-led coalition.

The operation was carried out in Seiyun, Hadhramaut, capturing eight civilians including women and children who were inside the residential property. One associate was arrested after resisting and was treated for injuries. Security forces recovered an explosive belt, two laptops, five mobile phones and two tablets, while authorities said the operation was supported by intelligence-sharing, surveillance and reconnaissance.
