= Abu al-Hasan al-Hashimi al-Qurashi =

Iraqi Islamic State leader (died 2022)

Amir al-Mu'minin Abu al-Hasan al-Hashimi al-Qurashi
- أبي الحسن الهاشمي القرشي

3rd Caliph of the Islamic State
- Reign; 4 February 2022 – 15 October 2022
- Preceded by: Abu Ibrahim al-Hashimi al-Qurashi
- Succeeded by: Abu al-Hussein al-Husseini al-Qurashi

Emir of Diwan al-Amn
- In office 2016–17 – c. 2019
- Preceded by: Abu Nasir Al-Mosuli
- Succeeded by: Not known

Governor of Wilayat Al-Sham
- In office 2016–2019

Personal details
- Born: Nour Karim Al-Mutni Al-Obaidi Al-Rifai; Unknown date Rawa, Iraq
- Died: 15 October 2022 Jasim, Syria
- Cause of death: Suicide bombing
- Religion: Sunni Islam
- Nickname(s): Sayf al-Baghdad ('Sword of Baghdad') "Carrier of Banner of Jihad and Khilafah" "Commander of Battalions of Mujahidin"
- Military career
- Allegiance: Islamic State
- Conflicts: War on terror; Iraqi insurgency (2003–2011); War against the Islamic State; Syrian civil war †

Abu al-Hasan al-Hashimi al-Qurashi (Arabic: أبو الحسن الهاشمي القرشي, romanized: Abū al-Ḥasan al-Hāshimī al-Qurashī), probably born Nour Karim al-Mutni Al-Obaidi Al-Rifai (Arabic: نور بن عبد الكريم المطني العُبيدي الرِّفاعي, romanized: Nur bin Abd-al Karim al-Mutni Al-Ubaidi Al-Rifai, lit. 'Nūr Karīm al-Muṭnī'; died 15 October 2022), was an Iraqi militant and the third caliph (Note: The Islamic State describes itself as a caliphate and its leader as a caliph, but this is not accepted by the vast majority of Muslims, and is disputed by multiple Muslim scholars and authors.) of the Islamic State. He was named as caliph on 10 March 2022, in an audio message by the new spokesperson of IS, Abu Umar al-Muhajir, whose announcement came more than a month after the death of his predecessor Abu Ibrahim al-Hashimi al-Qurashi. The message said that Abu al-Hassan was given a pledge of allegiance in response to the will of the former caliph. The Turkish government claimed that he was arrested in Istanbul on 26 May 2022. Later, Islamic State sources denied news reports of his arrest in the 347th issue of their weekly newsletter Al-Naba.

In November 2022, Islamic State spokesman Abu Umar al-Muhajir announced that Abu al-Hasan had been killed in combat. After confirmation by the Islamic State and the United States Central Command of his death in Syria, Abu Umar announced Abu al-Hussein al-Husseini al-Qurashi as Abu al-Hasan's successor.

== Identity ==
Abu al-Hasan was his kunya. Al-Hashimi and al-Qurashi indicate that he belonged to the Banu Hashim clan of the Quraysh tribe.

Al Ain News reported in March 2022 that al-Qurashi's real name was Zaid, an Iraqi national and the former emir of the Diwan of Education. A May 2022 United Nations Security Council (UNSC) report expanded on this, claiming that the most likely candidate as to his real identity was an Iraqi national by the name of Bashar Khattab Ghazal al-Sumaida'i, also known as Haji Zaid, stating:

Abu al-Hassan's identity is not yet established but has been much discussed among Member States, with Iraqi national Bashar Khattab Ghazal al-Sumaida'i cited as the most likely candidate. Some Member States suggested that al-Sumaida'i was arrested in Turkey near Istanbul in May; others maintain that he remains at large. IS has not yet commented.

Turkish president Recep Tayyip Erdoğan initially agreed with this claim after al-Sumaida'i was arrested, claiming that he had been acting as the highest figure in the Islamic State since the death of former caliph Abu Ibrahim al-Hashimi al-Qurashi. The Islamic State had never named their caliph to be al-Sumaida'i, and denied that he was imprisoned. The group openly and repeatedly mocked the al-Sumaida'i identity theory in its media.

From the start, there were also other theories as to his identity. According to two unnamed Iraqi security officials, al-Qurashi's real name was Juma Awad al-Badri, and he was the elder brother of former IS leader Abu Bakr al-Baghdadi. Research by Iraqi historian Hisham al-Hashimi published in 2020 stated that al-Badri was head of the five-member Shura Council.

Ultimately, it was reported by IS-linked sources that Abu al-Hasan was actually Islamic State leader Abdur Rahman al-Iraqi (Sayf Baghdad), born in Rawa, Iraq and killed in mid-October 2022 in the city of Jasim in Daraa Governorate, Syria. Later on, journalist Wa'il 'Isam claimed that the real birth name of Abu Al-Hassan/Abdur Rahman Iraqi was Nour Karim Al-Mutni. By late 2023, it was confirmed by both the US coalition and the pro Islamic State sources.

== Biography ==
Abu al-Hassan al-Hashimi, born Nour Karim al-Mutni, belonged to the Albu 'Ubayd tribe of Rawa in western al Anbar Governorate and grew up there. He studied computer engineering at the University of Baghdad but he abandoned these studies just before the Iraq War and joined the "Rawa Training camp" with Manaf Al-Rawi under the command of Al-Qaida in Iraq (AQI) leaders Omar Hadid and Abu Muhammad Al-Lubnani. He participated in the Battle of Fallujah under the emirate of Al-Zarqawi and afterward went out with Manaf al-Rawi to do "security" work and was imprisoned in Buka camp and then transferred to Abu Ghraib prison he was freed in some months because the US was not able to identify him. After coming out of prison, he started seeking religious knowledge under various AQI leaders including Abu Anas Ash-Shami and Maysarah al-Gharib. He was again imprisoned, this time by Awakening fighters, and remained imprisoned for one and a half years. Later on, he was released again and he joined the "Al-Shaykhain training camp" in Al-Anbar desert. Some additional details about his life stated that in 2005, his brother and seven of his relatives were kidnapped and killed by the mainly Shiite "Wolf Brigade" in Adhamiyah, Baghdad.

During 2013–14, he was sent by Abu Bakr Al-Baghdadi to Syria where he was given command over Islamic State activities in Latakia and Al-Hasakah province, and later on he played an instrumental role in the formation of Jaysh Khalid ibn al-Walid. Some of his relatives work in Al-Rawi Financial Network, subject to US sanctions. His brother, Firas, was detained in Idlib by Hayat Tahrir al-Sham. While operating in the administration of the IS "Baghdad Province", al-Mutni earned the nicknamed "Sword of Baghdad" (Sayf Baghdad). He served as Emir of Diwan al-Amn after the killing of his predecessor Abu Nasir Al-Mosuli and became governor of Wilayat Al-Shaam after the demise of Abu Muhammad al-Furqan in 2016–17 period as well as becoming Emir of Shura Council. According to an anti-Islamic State dissident source, by 2018, he worked under Abu Salem al-Iraqi (IS leader of Damascus in Yarmouk). In May of the same year, he left the Yarmouk camp and moved to Southern Syria where he was appointed supervisor over the Hawran Region.

Abu Bakr al-Baghdadi appointed him as a representative for some of Distant Wilayat and later on Hajji Abdullah assigned him Southern Syria, Palestine, and attacks on Jews.

During his tenure, Islamic State's second leader Abdullah Qardash chose him to be his successor.

In February, 2022 he was given allegiance as the "Caliph of Muslims", succeeding Abu Ibrahim Al-Hashimi.

After becoming Caliph, he started moving between Iraq and Syria. He went to Anbar to establish camps with Abu Muslim Al-Isawi (Islamic State "governor" for Iraq) and then left for Syria to lead the battles of Badiyah and later on Dara'a.

== Alleged arrest ==
On 26 May 2022, informed sources told Sky News Arabia that Abu al-Hasan had been arrested in Istanbul, and that security forces had reported the arrest to Erdoğan, who was expected to announce the news about the suspect. Turkish state-run Anadolu Agency later claimed that Turkish intelligence had been tracking his movements in Syria for a long period of time, and arrested him promptly after he illegally entered Turkey. In July, a UN Security Council report stated that there was no available clarification regarding the Turkish claim. On 16 September 2022, Islamic State spokesperson Abu Umar al-Muhajir seemingly denied claims that their caliph had been arrested, calling on Muslims globally to pledge allegiance to him.

== Death ==
In 2022, he arrived from Iraq to Daraa province and started working under aliases of Abdur Rahman al-Iraqi and Sayf Baghdad. On 14 August 2022, "reconciled" rebels in Tafas were able to apprehend a Syrian member of the IS shura council whose confessions indicated prominent IS leaders, including Abu Abdul Rahman al-Iraqi (who turned out to be the "Caliph") are present in Jassem. It is said that the intelligence from this arrested shura member eventually led to demise of Abu Hassan.

On 30 November 2022, the Islamic State announced that Abu al-Hasan had been killed while fighting. The spokesman of IS, Abu Umar, confirmed the news that same day. The United States Central Command confirmed that Abu al-Hassan killed himself by detonating a suicide vest during an operation carried out by former Free Syrian Army rebels which had aligned with government forces in Daraa Governorate in mid-October. In December, it was reported that the body of Abu Al-Hassan has been handed over to the US by reconciled rebels.

A pro IS media group created a tribute video on reign of Abu al-Hassan al-Hashimi and claimed that 1547 military operations were carried in his tenure as supreme leader of the Islamic State.

In August 2023, Islamic State spokesman Abu Hudayfah Al-Ansari first time officially confirmed that Abu Hassan Al-Hashimi was personally leading Islamic State operations in southern Syria and was killed fighting there.

In September 2023, a pro-Islamic State biography of Abu Al-Hassan stated that he fought a two-day clash against the "Nusayris", the Russians, and the "Sahwat", which ended with him killing dozens of them, then detonating his belt resulting in his death Rabi` al-Awwal of the year 1444H of the Islamic calendar.

=== Succession ===
He was replaced by Abu al-Hussein al-Husseini al-Qurashi as the fourth Caliph of the Islamic State. Based on the announcement of Abu al-Hussein's appointment, researcher Aymenn Jawad Al-Tamimi argued that he had probably not been designated as successor by Abu al-Hasan al-Hashimi al-Qurashi.

== Explanatory notes ==
Sunni Islam titles
| Preceded by Abu Ibrahim al-Hashimi al-Qurashi | 3rd Caliph of the Islamic State; 2022 | Succeeded by Abu al-Hussein al-Husseini al-Qurashi |
