= Abul-Hasan al-Muhajir =

Islamic State spokesman (died 2019)

- أبو الحسن المهاجر

Spokesman of the Islamic State
- In office 5 December 2016 – 27 October 2019
- Preceded by: Abu Mohammad al-Adnani
- Succeeded by: Abu Hamza al-Qurashi

Personal details
- Born: Thaher Salim Mohammad al-Shahiri ظاهر سليم محمد الشاهري; 1977 Riyadh, Saudi Arabia
- Died: 27 October 2019 (aged 41–42) Ayn al-Bayda, Jarabulus, Syria
- Cause of death: Air strike
- Criminal charge: Designated a terrorist by the United Nations Security Council and the US State Department

Military service
- Allegiance: Islamic State

Thaher Salim Mohammad al-Shahiri (Arabic: ظاهر سليم محمد الشاهري), known by his nom de guerre Abul-Hasan al-Muhajir (Arabic: أبو الحسن المهاجر; died 27 October 2019), was the second official spokesman of the Islamic State from December 2016 to October 2019, when he was killed in a U.S. airstrike in northwest Syria. He was a Saudi national. He was replaced by Abu Hamza al-Qurashi.

== History ==
Abul-Hasan in the Islamic State video from April 2019, which shows Abu Bakr al-Baghdadi's second appearance since 2014

Abul-Hasan was the successor of Abu Mohammad al-Adnani, who was killed while visiting the Aleppo frontlines in Syria in August 2016. He was believed to have been a foreigner due to his kunya identifying him as "al-Muhajir" meaning "the emigrant". After his death, he was confirmed to be a Saudi national on 31 October.

=== Speeches ===
- "And You Will Remember What I [Now] Say To You" – 5 December 2016
- "So Be Patient. Indeed, The Promise Of God Is Truth" – 4 April 2017
- "And When The Believers Saw The Companies" – 12 June 2017
- "So From Their Guidance Take An Example" – 22 April 2018
- "The Mujāhidīn’s Assault on the Tower of the Polytheists" – 26 September 2018
- "He Was True To God, So [God] Was True To Him" – 18 March 2019

=== Speculation about identity ===
In an article published in The Atlantic, journalist Graeme Wood postulates that Abul-Hasan al-Muhajir is Texas-born John Georgelas, also known as Yahya Abu Hassan, though he later cast doubt on his theory, and al-Bahrumi was eventually killed in October 2017.

== Death ==
Muhajir and four others were killed on 27 October 2019 by a Central Intelligence Agency airstrike in Ayn al-Bayda, near Jarablus in northwest Syria, close to the border with Turkey. It came less than 24 hours after IS leader Abu Bakr al-Baghdadi blew himself up during a U.S. raid in Syria's Idlib Province. Muhajir was described as a senior IS leader and Baghdadi's "right-hand man."

On 29 October, U.S. President Donald Trump stated on social media that al-Baghdadi's "number one replacement" had been killed by American forces, adding: "Most likely would have taken the top spot - Now he is also Dead!" While Trump did not specify a name, a U.S. official later confirmed that Trump was referring to al-Muhajir. On 31 October, IS confirmed al-Muhajir and al-Baghdadi's deaths.
