= Islamic State – Iraq Province =

Islamic State branch in Iraq

- الدَّولةُ الإِسْلَامِيَّة – وِلَايَة ٱلْعِرَاق
- Leaders: Abu Bakr al-Baghdadi (May 16, 2010 (Pre-Caliphate declaration)–April 7, 2013); Abu Muslim al-Turkmani (April 8, 2013–August 18, 2015); Abu Fatima al-Jaheishi (August 18, 2015–February 18, 2017); Abdallah Makki Muslih al-Rufay'i (2021–2025)
- Dates active: April 8, 2013–Present
- Allegiance: Islamic State
- Headquarters: Baquba (April 8, 2013–January 4, 2014); Fallujah (January 4, 2014–June 10, 2014); Mosul (June 10, 2014–July 21, 2017); Hawija (July 21, 2017–October 8, 2017); Al-Qa'im (October 8, 2017–November 3, 2017); Unknown (November 3, 2017–Present)
- Ideology: Islamic Statism

The Islamic State – Iraq Province (Arabic: الدَّولةُ الإِسْلَامِيَّة – وِلَايَة ٱلْعِرَاق, romanized: al-Dawlah al-Islāmīyah – Wilāyat al-ʻIrāq) or just Wilayat al-Iraq (Arabic: وِلَايَة ٱلْعِرَاق, romanized: Wilāyat al-ʻIrāq) is a province of the Islamic State and was one of the main provinces during the time of the Islamic States' expansion from 2013–2015 with Wilāyat aš-Šam (Syria). It was part of the Islamic State of Iraq and the Islamic State of Iraq and Syria before its declaration of a caliphate.

== History ==
The Islamic State was originally only in Iraq during the Iraqi insurgency (2011–2013) until it expanded into Syria during the Syrian civil war and allying with Al-Nusra Front, renaming itself as the Islamic State of Iraq and Sham. During this time, they announced two different areas of its control, Iraq and Syria. Originally, the Iraq province wasn't united as one wilayah, and instead was situated among several different provinces of Baghdad, Al Anbar, Diyala, Kirkuk, Saladin, Nineveh, and parts of Babil.

=== 2013 ===
On April 8, 2013, the Islamic State of Iraq's leader, Abu Bakr al-Baghdadi, officially renamed themselves to the Islamic State of Iraq and Syria, which led to the establishment of the province (Wilayah) of Iraq which it already had expansions into.

In late 2013, activities were expanded by the Islamic State of Iraq and Syria further south in the province, specifically along the Diyala River Valley. This area is considered important for them because the orchards in the valley offer effective concealment and allow for east-west movement to southern Salah ad-Din and the northern Baghdad belts, including Al-Tarmia, which is another identified support zone. Incidents involving attacks on farmers in Abu Saida and other locations along the Diyala River Valley were reported on September 24, September 25, and October 6. To also help with their expansions, the Islamic State of Iraq and Syria caused conflict between Shia and Sunnis in the regions so the Sunnis would support the Islamic State of Iraq and Syria more than the Shia-majority government of Iraq.

On December 4, 2013, a series of coordinated attacks occurred in central and northern Iraq, with a significant assault targeting a government building and a nearby shopping mall in Kirkuk. Over 30 individuals were killed, and at least 106 were injured in the incidents that day.

During their expansion in Iraq in 2013, the Islamic State of Iraq and Syria conducted a sustained campaign targeting electricity pylons that transmit Iranian electricity to Iraq. More recently, they have targeted Iranian pipeline crews working on a project to supply Iranian gas to power stations in Diyala and eventually Baghdad which, on December 13, 2013, an attack on pipeline teams resulted in the deaths of 15 Iranians and three Iraqis.

The Islamic State of Iraq and Syria was involved in clashes in western Iraq on December 30, 2013, when Iraqi security forces arrested Sunni MP Ahmed al-Alwani and engaged in conflict with some of his relatives from the Albo-alon clan of the Dulaim tribe, the largest tribe in Anbar. On the following day, Iraqi security forces dismantled a year-old Sunni protest camp in Ramadi.

=== 2014 ===
By January 2014, the war the Islamic State of Iraq and Syria in Iraq has continued caused the displacement of nearly six million Iraqis which is around 15% of the entire population of the country.

On January 4, the Islamic State of Iraq and Syria took over Fallujah in the fall of Fallujah and parts of Ramadi establishing Wilayat al-Fallujah. This was one of the first major victories for the Islamic State of Iraq and Syria and one of the first major loses for Iraq since the United States led invasion of Iraq in 2003. By January 6, the fighting in the area caused 65 people to be killed.

By January 8, Islamic State of Iraq and Syria militants expanded their presence in Ramadi and Abu Ghraib.

On January 10, Islamic State of Iraq and Syria militants took over the towns of Rawa and Anah which were later used as places to shoot mortars at Iraqi forces in Al Anbar Governorate.

On February 2, Al-Qaeda under the guise of Abu al-Zawahiri disavow and cut all ties with the Islamic State of Iraq and Syria in a statement saying "Daesh [ISIS] is not a branch of the Qaidat al-Jihad [al-Qaeda's official name] group, we have no organizational relationship with it, and the group is not responsible for its actions.".

On February 3, Iraqi forces that deployed to the Ramadi area clashed with Islamic State of Iraq and Syria militants in order to regain control of the area with Al-Qaeda no longer backing the organization at all.

During the Islamic State of Iraq and Syria expansions in Iraq in 2014, they made heavy advancements into Northern Iraq and into Iraqi Kurdistan.

On June 10, the Islamic State of Iraq and Syria took over the city of Mosul in Iraqi Kurdistan during the fall of Mosul. Around 2,500 Iraqi soldiers were killed in battle and over 4,000 prisoners of war and other prisoners were executed. On the same day, around 1,000 prisoners were executed in the Badush prison in the Badush prison massacre in Badush, Nineveh, Iraq. As well on June 10, the towns of Hawija, al-Zab, Riyadh and Abbasi fell to Islamic State of Iraq and Syria control.

On June 12, the Islamic State of Iraq and Syria executed around 1,700 Shia Muslims in Camp Speicher during the Camp Speicher massacre.

Through June 17 and 18, the Islamic State of Iraq and Syria attempted to take over Kirkuk, but failed to do so after having their assault repelled by the Peshmerga, but 4 villages in Kirkuk Governorate.

On 19 June, Islamic State of Iraq and Syria forces captured Al-Qa'im, and in the evening of 21 June, Islamic State of Iraq and Syria forces also captured the town of Ar-Rutbah.

On June 22, Islamic State of Iraq and Syria militants took the border crossings of al-Waleed, on the Iraqi-Syrian frontier, and the Karameh Border Crossing, on the Jordanian border.

On June 24, the Islamic State of Iraq and Syria took over the Baiji oil refinery from Popular Mobilization Forces.

On June 29, the Islamic State of Iraq and Syria declared a caliphate and named Abu Bakr al-Baghdadi as the caliph, renaming the organization as the Islamic State.

On July 3, the Islamic State took over the town of Nukhayb where Iraqi forces, according to the Islamic State, fled to Karbala, though Iraq denies this claim.

Throughout early July, Islamic State militants started destroying shrines and ancient mosques in Mosul, these included two cathedrals.

In early July, Islamic State militants assaulted an Iraqi army convoy in Al-Khalidiya, Al Anbar Governorate, after blowing up a Humvee with an IED and then shooting the convoy, this resulted in the destruction of at least one tank and two M113 armored personnel carriers via bombing and one M1 Abrams destroyed.

On July 7, Islamic State militants began their destruction of ancient artifacts of the Assyrian and Babylonian empires in Nineveh due to the fact that they're considered shirk (idolatrous).

On July 9, according to Iraqi sources to the United Nations, the Islamic State seized nuclear material that was used for scientific research with nearly 40 kilograms (88 pounds) of uranium compounds being stolen from University of Mosul.

By July 22, Islamic State militants took control of territory and extended the frontlines to 70 kilometers (45 miles) from Iraq's capital, Baghdad.

According to a United Nations investigation and report, Islamic State authorities in Mosul told all women aged 11 to 46 to under female genital mutilation in Mosul on July 24.

On July 27, inhabitants of Mosul began combating Islamic State militants within after forming an anti-ISIS organization.

On the morning of August 3, Islamic State forces took control of the city of Sinjar and the surrounding area. They then destroyed the Sayyidah Zaynab Mosque in Sinjar, acted against those who resisted, and required residents to pledge allegiance and convert to Islam or face execution.

Through August 8–11, the United States Air Force executed a total of 30 successful airstrikes against the Islamic State near the Syrian border in Iraq.

Between 1 and 15 August, the Islamic State (Iraq Province) expanded its control over territory in northern Iraq. In the regions north and west of Mosul, the Islamic State captured Zummar, Sinjar, Wana, Mosul Dam, Qaraqosh, Tel Keppe, Batnaya, and Kocho. In the areas south and east of Mosul, the towns of Bakhdida, Karamlesh, Bartella, and Makhmour refugee camp were also taken. This offensive led to the displacement of 200,000 Yazidi civilians and 100,000 Assyrians, along with the killing of 5,000 Yazidi men and the enslavement of 5,000–7,000 Yazidi women, prompting a foreign military intervention against the Islamic State.

Through August 16–19, Islamic State militants fought Iraqi Special Operations Forces and Kurdish Peshmerga, supported by U.S.-led Coalition airstrikes during the Battle of the Mosul Dam, an offensive against the Islamic State for the Mosul Dam which ended in joint Iraqi and Kurdish victory.

On August 19, the Islamic State repelled an offensive by the Iraqi army in Tikrit after the Islamic State defeat at Mosul dam, the Iraqi army stopped the offensive due to heavy machine gun and mortar fire from the south of Tikrit, and encountering landmines and snipers.

Throughout August, the Islamic State started using oil fields for illegal oil trade in Iraq where militants smuggled oil to supply and fund the Islamic State, by August 20, the Islamic State controlled 5 oil fields in Iraq.

On August 24, the United Nations made a statement calling for the Islamic State to stop their besiegement of the town of Amirli in Saladin Governorate, this was brought up by Bulgarian diplomat Nickolay Mladenov who also told the Iraqi government to vacate the town and the people or give the people humanitarian aid, these comments were made in response to the western world not making many comments on the situation.

On September 15, Islamic State gunmen, along with local militias, entered an Iraqi military base. The Iraqi soldiers, unsure of how to respond, made calls for assistance. Inside the base, Islamic State militants instructed the soldiers to board several trucks upon their arrival. Reports indicate that Islamic State fighters fired at civilians and those attempting to intervene before replacing the Iraqi flag with the Islamic State Black Standard.

On September 22, Islamic State militants launched an inghimasi operation against an Iraqi military base using an Iraqi humvee-turned VBIED.

On September 25, Islamic State militants overran an Iraqi military base northeast of Fallujah, in Saqlawiyah, after taking over the town of Alsigir. Over 300 Iraqi soldiers were killed in the assault.

On October 1, Islamic State militants overran the Albu Aytha Base near Ramadi taking all of its weapons with 240 and 600 people were under siege beforehand.

On October 2, the Islamic State started a battle with Iraqi and pro-government forces in Hit. After seizing Hit, the Islamic State began attacking the Al-Asad airbase nearby.

After fights with Iraqi forces on October 5, Iraqi forces accused the Islamic State of using chemical weapons, specifically chlorine gas, against Iraqi forces in Anbar in Saqlawiya, near Fallujah. On the same day, Jordanian and Saudi forces attacked Islamic State militants in Iraq after using radar systems placed in the Ajloun mountain area in the north.

On October 6, the Royal Air Force targeted Islamic State militants near Ramadi using two Panavia Tornados with precision-guided bombs.

On October 8, the Islamic State, in the city of Baiji, used man-portable air-defense systems to take down helicopters used by the Iraqi military, killing the two pilots on board. Iraqi forces also killed 30 Islamic State militants in Tikrit.

On October 9, the United States Central Command confirms an airstrike against Islamic State militants near Sinjar destroying an armed vehicle and a small unit of Islamic State militants. Near Baqubah, and Islamic State suicide bomber detonated a VBIED in the Shafta area killing 12.

On October 11, an Islamic State suicide bomber using an explosive belt 17 miles (28 kilometers) north of the capital Baghdad between the towns of Tarmiyah and Mishahda in a market killing 11 and injuring 21. The Islamic State also claimed responsibility for a suicide bombing in Qara Tappa, north of Diyala province, using three foreign fighters including a German, a Turk, and a Saudi, killing 28 and injuring up to 90.

On October 13, the Islamic State seized an Iraqi military base in Anbar in the town of Hit. During advances in Anbar, around 180,000 people fled the city of Hit to Ramadi.

On October 20, at three o'clock, Islamic State forces moved into various areas around Jabal Shingal. Eyewitnesses noted that 40 Humvees were utilized during the movement.

On December 13, the Islamic State continued its aggressive expansion in Iraq, advancing to within 32 kilometers of the strategic city of Ramadi, located in the Al Anbar Governorate, west of Baghdad. This development marked a significant escalation in their campaign to consolidate control over the region. Shortly after, the city of Hīt, another key urban center within the same governorate, was confirmed to have fallen entirely under the group's control. This loss further underscored the Islamic State's growing dominance in Al Anbar, heightening concerns over the security of nearby cities and the stability of the Iraqi government’s hold in the region.

== Provinces within Iraq Province ==
There are 10 wilayahs within the Iraq province before they all merged into a singular Iraq Wilayah.

Logo	Name	Native Name	Area	Citation
	Anbar Province	وِلَايَة اَلْأَنْبَار	in most of the Anbar Governorate	
	Badiyah Province	وِلَايَة اَلبَادِيَة	in the Iraqi area of the Syrian Desert	
	Baghdad Province	وِلَايَة بَغْدَاد	in the area of Baghdad Governorate	
	Diyala Province	وِلَايَة دِيَالَى	in the area of Diyala Governorate	
	Jazirah Wilayah	وِلَايَة الْجَزِيرَة	in the Iraqi area of Al-Jazira (caliphal province)	
	Janub Province	وِلَايَة جَنُوب	in the area of southern Iraq	
	Kirkuk Province	وِلَايَة كَرْكُوكْ	in the area of Kirkuk Governorate	
	Nineveh Province	وِلَايَة نِينَوَىٰ	in the area of Nineveh Governorate	
	North Baghdad Wilayah	وِلَايَة شَمَال بَغْدَاد	in the area north of Baghdad Governorate	
	Saladin Province	وِلَايَة صَلَاح الدِّين	in the area of Saladin Governorate	
	Tigris Province	وِلَايَة دِجلَة	in the Iraqi area of the Tigris	
