= Abu al-Hussein al-Husseini al-Qurashi =

Islamic State leader from 2022 to 2023

Amir al-Mu'minin Abu al-Hussein al-Husseini al-Qurashi
- أبو الحسين الحسيني القرشي

4th Caliph of the Islamic State
- In office 30 November 2022 – 29 April 2023
- Preceded by: Abu al-Hasan al-Hashimi al-Qurashi
- Succeeded by: Abu Hafs al-Hashimi al-Qurashi

Personal details
- Born: Unknown
- Died: 29 April 2023 Idlib Governorate, Syria
- Cause of death: Suicide bombing
- Military career
- Allegiance: Islamic State
- Conflicts: War on terror; War against the Islamic State

Abu al-Hussein al-Husseini al-Qurashi (Arabic: أبو الحسين الحسيني القرشي, romanized: Abū al-Ḥusayn al-Husaynī al-Qurashī; died 29 April 2023) was the fourth caliph (Note: The Islamic State describes itself as a caliphate and its leader as a caliph, but this is not accepted by the vast majority of Muslims, and is disputed by multiple Muslim scholars and authors.) of the Islamic State and allegedly the first Syrian to claim the title. He took office on 30 November 2022.

== Life ==
=== Rise to power ===
According to Turkish claims, Abu al-Hussein al-Husseini joined the Islamic State in early 2013. He took over leadership after the death of the previous leader Abu al-Hasan al-Hashimi al-Qurashi. He was announced as caliph by Islamic State's official spokesmen Abu Umar al-Muhajir in an audio message broadcast by Al-Furqan Media foundation (Islamic State's primary media).

Abu al-Hussein was described as a veteran of Islamic State and a loyal member of the group. In January 2023, a prominent dissident anti-IS leadership channel alleged that Abu al-Hussein was Iraqi like his predecessors and was appointed by a shura council led by Abdul Raouf al-Muhajir, emir of Islamic State's administration.

=== Leader of the Islamic State ===
By 19 January 2023, Abu al-Hussein had received pledges from all Islamic State provinces, and also from Islamic State supporters in around 40 countries. He also received some pledges of support from outside people who were not previously part of the group.

As of April, according to an Iraqi security official, Iraqi, Turkish and American intelligence agencies were cooperating with each other to identify Abu al-Hussein al-Husseini.

=== Alleged death reports ===
On 27 February 2023, Iraqi media reported the killing of Abu al-Hussein in an operation by the Iraqi Army in the desert of Anbar, but these reports were not confirmed by Iraqi military officials.

In June 2023, British tabloid the Daily Mirror claimed that Abu al-Hussein was possibly among 5 IS leaders who were reportedly killed in an Iraqi/UK airstrike in the Hamrin region of Iraq, but the report was not confirmed by any other sources and the eventual confirmation of Abu al-Hussein's death said he was killed in Syria, not Iraq.

== Death ==
On 30 April 2023, Turkish President Recep Tayyip Erdoğan announced that the Turkish National Intelligence Organization had allegedly tracked down and killed Abu al-Hussein the previous day, on 29 April.

Turkish state-run news agency Anadolu Agency reported that the operation occurred at Jindires, in a region controlled by Turkish-backed rebel groups, in which Abu al-Hussein detonated his suicide vest to avoid being captured. The United States said it had no information to verify Turkey's claims.

On 15 May 2023, a statement attributed to the Islamic State that denied the death of Abu al-Hussein al-Husseini in the Turkish operation was circulating in the Al-Hawl refugee camp, but the statement turned out to be a forgery.

On 3 August 2023, the Islamic State's official spokesman Abu Hudhayfah Al-Ansari announced the death of Abu al-Hussein al-Husseini al-Qurashi. The spokesman claimed he was killed in direct clashes with the HTS group in Idlib province in rebel-held northwestern Syria and accused HTS of acting as agents of Turkish intelligence. The message also named Abu Hafs al-Hashimi al-Qurashi as Abu al-Hussein's successor and caliph of the Islamic State.

On 4 August, HTS in an official statement denied Islamic State's claim that they killed Abu al-Hussein. However, United States officials agreed that HTS was behind the death of Abu al-Hussein al-Husseini al-Quraishi.

== Notes ==
Sunni Islam titles
Preceded by Abu al-Hasan al-Hashimi al-Qurashi	4th Caliph of the Islamic State; 2022–2023	Succeeded by Abu Hafs al-Hashimi al-Qurashi
