= Abu Hafs al-Hashimi al-Qurashi =

Caliph of the Islamic State since 2023

- أبو حفص الهاشمي القرشي

5th Caliph of the Islamic State
- Incumbent
- Assumed office 3 August 2023
- Preceded by: Abu al-Hussein al-Husseini al-Qurashi

Personal details
- Religion: Sunni Islam (Salafi jihadism)
- Military career
- Allegiance: Islamic State
- Rank: Caliph
- Conflicts: War on terror; War against the Islamic State

Abu Hafs al-Hashimi al-Qurashi (Arabic: أبو حفص الهاشمي القرشي, romanized: ʾAbū Ḥafṣ al-Hāshimī al-Qurashī) is the fifth and current caliph (Note: The Islamic State describes itself as a caliphate and its leader as a caliph, but this is not accepted by the vast majority of Muslims and Muslim scholars.) of the Islamic State. He was named as caliph on 3 August 2023, in an audio message by the spokesman of the IS, Abu Hudhayfah al-Ansari, whose announcement came four months after the death of his predecessor Abu al-Hussein al-Husseini al-Qurashi.

== Alleged identity ==
In August 2023, it was speculated that Abu Hafs al-Hashimi al-Qurashi might be the new identity of either Abu Khadijah al-Iraqi or Abu al-Muthanna al-Janubi, two Iraqi Islamic State leaders. In 2024, a United States airstrike in Somalia and coinciding claims by anonymous officials resulted in speculations about Islamic State's Somalia Province leader Abdul Qadir Mumin being Abu Hafs al-Hashimi al-Qurashi. However, many researchers and analysts dismissed these claims as highly unlikely. Mumin would not be a Qurayshi which would run counter to the ideology of the Islamic State, and thus endanger the group's self-perceived legitimacy, and also not part of the group's traditional, Iraqi-dominated leadership. Conversely, researchers Austin Doctor and Gina Ligon pointed out that Mumin's experiences with the increasingly important African theater, finances, religious scholarship, and Western culture also provided potential benefits if he had been appointed to a leading position.

== Life ==
Very little is known about Abu Hafs' early life. IS only admitted that he was a long-serving veteran of the group.

Following the death of Abu al-Hussein al-Husseini al-Qurashi, the IS Majlis-ash-Shura (consultation council) discussed a potential successor as caliph. The shura mutually agreed to appoint Abu Hafs who officially took over the IS leadership on 3 August 2023. He was announced as caliph by Islamic State's official spokesmen Abu Hudhayfah al-Ansari, in an audio message broadcast by Al-Furqan Media Foundation (Islamic State's primary media outlet). As the announcement also cited a number of medieval Islamic scholars like al-Mazari and al-Nawawi in support of Abu Hafs' caliphate, some researchers such as M. Nureddin argued that Abu Hafs' rise had been contentious within the IS high command. Nureddin argued that these issues necessitated that the validity of the allegiance to Abu Hafs was bolstered by citing renowned past scholars. However, researcher Aymenn Jawad Al-Tamimi disagreed, instead arguing that the references to al-Mazari and al-Nawawi were merely supposed to emphasize that Abu Hafs could be a valid IS leader despite remaining "behind a veil of obscurity for security reasons". In general, Al-Tamimi described Abu Hafs as the third in a line of IS "caliphs of the shadows" or "faceless caliphs", as very little was known about him or his predecessors Abu al-Hussein al-Husseini al-Qurashi and Abu al-Hasan al-Hashimi al-Qurashi compared to the first two IS caliphs.

The global network of IS quickly pledged loyalty to Abu Hafs, ranging from large sections such as the West Africa Province to smaller groups like the Yemen Province. There was also a pledge of loyalty by a group in Sudan, though IS had not previously admitted a presence in this country. At the time of the appointment of Abu Hafs, IS was experiencing a resurgence in Syria, with its forces increasing their attacks on the Syrian government as well as civilians. However, the group was still under extreme pressure in both Syria and Iraq, evidenced by the quick succession of killed leaders. Regardless, Abu Hafs and the remaining IS central command seemed convinced to remain in the region and not to relocate, as they still considered the Middle East their heartland.

In June 2024, according to a U.S. assessment reported by Voice of America, rumors suggested that Abu Hafs al-Hashimi al-Qurashi had relocated from Syria or Iraq, passing through Yemen, and ultimately linked up with the Islamic State's Somalia Province. This however was unconfirmed.

== Notes ==
Sunni Islam titles
Preceded by Abu al-Hussein al-Husseini al-Qurashi	5th Caliph of the Islamic State; 2023–present	Incumbent
