= Abu Omar al-Muhajir =

Spokesman for Islamic State from 2022 to 2023

- أبو عمر المهاجر

Spokesman of the Islamic State
- In office 10 March 2022 – April 2023
- Preceded by: Abu Hamza Al-Qurashi
- Succeeded by: Abu Hudhayfah Al-Ansari

Military service
- Allegiance: Islamic State

Abu Omar al-Muhajir served as the fourth spokesman for the Salafi jihadist group Islamic State (IS), from 10 March 2022 until his capture in April 2023 by the Hay'at Tahrir al-Sham (HTS). He succeeded Abu Hamza Al-Qurashi in March 2022, and was replaced by Abu Hudhayfah Al-Ansari in August 2023.

== History ==
Abu Omar al-Muhajir was announced as spokesman in a speech of Al-Furqan Foundation in March 2022, and he made four audio speeches in his tenure as spokesman for the Islamic State.

His speeches included:

- “Some Have Fulfilled Their Obligations [by Martyrdom]” - 10 March 2022
- “Fight Them, and God Will Punish Them At Your Hands” - 17 April 2022
- “And Hold Fast, All of You, to the Rope of God and Be Not Divided” 15 September 2022
- “So they kill and are killed” 30 November 2022

== Identity ==
Little is known about Abu Omar al-Muhajir. It was speculated by Yemeni journalist Mohammed Faisal on Twitter that he is Juma'a Al-Badri, a brother of Abu Bakr al-Baghdadi, but this was never confirmed. Many analysts believed his accent to be Iraqi after analyzing his speeches. HTS did not present him before media after his capture nor comment on his capture.
