= List of Islamic State members =

This is a list of current and former members of the Islamic State of Iraq and the Levant (ISIL), or also known as Islamic State of Iraq and Syria (ISIS) and its previous incarnations, including operating as a branch of al-Qaeda known as al-Qaeda in Iraq (AQI), from 2004 to 2006. Little is known about the leadership or members, as most use assumed names and many fight or appear in video with covered faces. Most of its members are former officers and soldiers of Saddam Hussein's regime led by the Iraqi Ba'ath Party after its collapse in 2003.

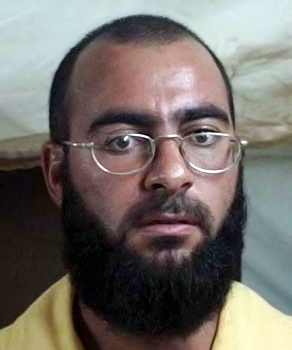
Former IS leader Abu Bakr al-Baghdadi; mugshot by US armed forces while in detention at Camp Bucca in 2004

== Current leadership, branches and personnel ==
=== Leadership ===
- Abu Hafs al-Hashimi al-Qurashi, caliph since 3 August 2023.
- Omar al-Furkan, high ranking IS fighter. Candidate for 2nd IS Caliph. Member of IS's leading council.
- Ayoub Rakawi, candidate for 2nd IS caliph.
- Faysal Ahmad Ali al-Zahrani (born 1986), top Saudi oil official.
- Abu Yusaf, senior security official, European.
- Abu Muhammad al-Jazrawi, head of Hisbah. (Islamic religious police)
- Abu Jandal al-Masri, Chief of Information in Raqqa, Egyptian.
- Abu Suleyman al-Firansi - Moroccan, former soldier of the French Foreign Legion, worked with the Brussels Islamic State terror cell and is one of the suspected masterminds behind the November 2015 Paris attacks.
- Fatiha Mejjati (born 1961), senior female commander, Moroccan.
- Abu Ahmed (senior official interviewed by The Guardian)
- Ahlam al-Nasr, propagandist (poet by profession), Syrian.
- Abdullah al-Belgian, preacher and propagandist.
- Mawlavi Habib Ur Rahman – successor to Qari Hekmat in the north of Afghanistan.
- Abu Nuh – (IS figure)
- Abu Salman al-Andalusí, propagandist after the 2017 Barcelona attacks.
- Hasna al-Sabiti, leader.
- Khadra Essa (also known as Umm Qaqa al-Somali) is a Dutch citizen of Somali origin who was a Sharia instructor of the Nusaybah women's battalion.

=== Foreign IS branches and governors of IS territories ===
- Mubarak Mohammed al-Otaibi, Syria-based deputy leader of operations in Saudi Arabia.
- Abu Yasir Hassan, Leader of the Islamic State's Mozambique province.
- Abdirahman Fahiye Isse Mohamud, Leader of the Islamic State in Somalia.
- Musa Baluku, Leader of Islamic State – Central Africa Province.
- Shahab al-Muhajir, Leader of Islamic State – Khorasan Province.
- Abu Abdillah al-Muhajir, Leader of Islamic State — East Asia Province.
- Abu Habib al-Libi, senior Libyan leader, served in both Iraq and Libya.
- Muhammad Sholeh Ibrahim, Indonesian leader.
- Jalaluddin al-Tunisi, IS leader in Tripoli.
- Abu Hajar al-Hashemi, Leader of IS Sinai Province.
- Abu al-Baraa el-Azdi, Governor in IS "Province" of Eastern Libya.
- Abu Fatima al-Jaheishi, Governor of 'South and Central Euphrates' region.
- Abdul Qadir Mumin, Leader of the Islamic State in Somalia's al-Karrar office.
- Abdiweli Mohamed Yusuf, aka Abdiweli aw-Mahamud or Ina-Waran Walaac, head of the finance office of Islamic State of Somalia.
- Hachim Chaib (born 1984), known by his nom de guerre Abu Hanifah al-Belgiki, is a chief of Islamic religious police and executioner.
- Abu Dujana al-Jubouri, Governor of the Aleppo Province.

=== Personnel ===
- Abu Huzaifa al-Kanadi – Canadian IS recruit, returned to Canada in 2016.
- Sharmeena Begum – British school girl who travelled to join IS after her mother died of cancer.
- Abu Muhammad al-Italy, who edited an article of Voice of Khorasan.
- Muhammed Amin (born 1935), oldest jihadist in IS and member of the uyghurs who left China with his family after his son was killed fighting in Syria.
- Abu Dujanah al-Baljiki is an IS fighter from Belgium who highlighted a remote-control anti-aircraft weapon to target American and French aircraft in a video titled We Will Surely Guide Them To Our Ways.
- Abu Jihad al-Rusi, an IS fighter from Russia.
- Abu Suhayb al-Faransi (born c. 1950), a former army trainer and businessman.
- Abu Salih al-Amriki is an IS fighter who urged to carry out attacks and vowed to raise the IS flag over the White House.
- Abu Jihad Karachai (The real name is Islam Atabiev), (born 1983) Umar's companion.
- Abu Anisa al-Dagestani (Abu Muhammad ar-Rusi)
- Abu Maram al-Jazairi
- Abu Ahmed al-Firansi
- Abu Daoud al-Maghribi
- Yanis Belhamra, known by his nom de guerre Abdul Wadoud from France, Islamic State fighter, who taunted President Francois Hollande. He is a former pizza delivery man.
- Abu al-Abbass al-Shami, Islamic State fighter who appeared in a video called Inside the Khilafah and called on the organization's operatives to "rise up against the infidels" and promised they will reach them from the desert.
- Mounir Raad (b. 1997), known by his nom de guerre Abu Adam al-Australi, fighter who appeared in Inside the Khilafah 2 and urge supporters to join the fight in Philippines and to take up arms at home and abroad.
- Abu Abdullah al-Habashi (from Britain) (1993-2014), Islamic State fighter who appeared in a propaganda video on October 2014. It is believed he died in the Syrian border town of Kobani at the age of 21 in November 2014. He was born into a Christian family of Eritrean heritage, in 2009 he converted to Islam and travelled to Syria in December 2013.
- Abu Dauoud al-Almani (from Germany), Islamic State fighter who calls to join ISIS.
- Michaël Dos Santos, known by his nom de guerre Abu Osman or Abou Othman (born 1992), ISIL executioner who joined the group in 2013. He was from the Paris suburb of Champigny-sur-Marne and appeared in a video slaying hostages, including Peter Kassig.
- Abdul Haleem al-Tunisi, foreign fighter.
- Abou Tayssir el Faransi, French fighter who threatens France.

== Former leaders and senior personnel ==
=== Leaders and personnel captured ===
- Abu Omar al-Kurdi (captured in 2005)
- Abdul Hadi al-Iraqi (captured in 2006)
- Hamid Juma Faris Jouri al-Saeedi (captured in 2006)
- Khaled al-Mashhadani (captured in 2007)
- Bilal Bosnić, (Bosnian Recruiter, captured in 2014)
- Umm Sayyaf, Abu Sayyaf spouse, also senior leader, was captured in May 2015.
- Ubaydullah Hussain, (Norwegian Recruiter, captured in December 2015)
- Salah Abdeslam (captured in March 2016)
- Neil Prakash (Australian IS recruiter, captured in 2016)
- Abu Walaa, (German propagandist, captured on November 8, 2016)
- Hussein al-Dhufairi, (senior Kuwaiti Leader, captured in Manila, Philippines on 6 April 2017)
- Abdullah el-Faisal – propagandist and recruiter, Jamaican. Captured on 25 August 2017.
- Ismail al-Eithawi – (Top aide to Baghdadi, captured in February 2018)
- Mohammed Haydar Zammar (captured in March 2018)
- Saddam al-Jammal – (Deputy IS governor of their Euphrates province, captured on 9 May 2018)
- Mohammed al-Qadeer – (Top IS commander, captured on 9 May 2018)
- Omar al-Karbouli – (Top IS commander, captured on 9 May 2018)
- Essam al-Zawbai – (Top IS commander, captured on 9 May 2018)
- Saddam Omar Hussein al-Jamal, commander in Al-Bukamal, Deir Ezzor, responsible for the burning of Jordanian pilot Muath al-Kaseasbeh, was captured in 2018.
- Mark John Taylor – (foreign fighter from New Zealand, captured by Kurdish Forces in December 2018)
- Mohammed Khalifa, (Canadian propagandist, captured in January 2019 and sentenced to life in prison.)
- Abu Osama al-Muhajer, (leader of Islamic State – Yemen Province, captured on 25 June 2019, Killed in Syria in July 2023)
- Abu Abdul Bari - Also known as "Shifa Ali Bashir Muhammad Gerges" and "Shifa al-Nima", (senior Mufti, captured on 18 January 2020)
- Mawlawi Aslam Farooqi, (Leader of Islamic State – Khorasan Province, captured on 4 April 2020)
- Abdullah Qardash, (High ranking leader, captured on 20 May 2020)
- Mu'taz Numan 'Abd Nayif Najm al-Jaburi, (senior leader and bomb-maker, killed on 26 May 2020)
- Sami Jasim Muhammad al-Jaburi — Also known as "Hajji Hamid", (manager of finances, captured in October 2021)
- Allison Fluke-Ekren, (Leader of Khatibah Nusaybah, captured in 2021)
- Abu Omar al-Muhajir (Spokesman, captured on 29 April 2023)
- Hashem Abu Sidra, leader of Islamic State in Libya, was captured on 4 January 2024.

=== Leaders killed ===
- Abu Musab al-Zarqawi (founder; killed in June 2006)
- Abu Ayyub al-Masri (killed in April 2010)
- Abu Omar al-Baghdadi (killed in April 2010)
- Al-Nasser Lideen Allah Abu Suleiman (head of military shura; killed in February 2011)
- Haji Bakr (strategic head and top deputy in Syria, killed in January 2014)
- Abu Abdulrahman al-Bilawi (head of Military Shura, killed in June 2014)
- Abu Khattab al-Kurdi, (senior commander, killed on November 27, 2014)
- Abu Mohannad al-Sweidawi (member of Military Shura; killed in November 2014)
- Reda Seyam (senior education official, killed in December 2014)
- Othman al-Nazih (a Saudi ideologue of the Islamic State killed in early 2015 in Kobani)
- Abu Sayyaf (senior leader overseeing IS's gas and oil operations, killed in May 2015)
- Anas al-Nashwan (Abu Malik al-Tamimi al-Najdi), a senior IS Sharia official.
- Ali Awni al-Harzi, key person of interest in Benghazi attack, was killed on 15 June 2015 in an airstrike in Mosul, Iraq.
- Tariq bin al-Tahar bin al-Falih al-'Awni al-Harzi (emir of suicide bombers, fundraiser killed in June 2015)
- Abu Muslim al-Turkmani (also known as Abu Mutaz al-Qurashi, deputy leader in charge of Iraq; killed on 18 August 2015)
- Abu Nabil al-Anbari (Leader of IS in Libya, killed in an airstrike in November 2015)
- Abu Saleh, senior Iraqi leader (killed in 2015)
- Mullah Abdul Rauf (deputy leader of Wilayat Khorasan; killed in 2015)
- Abdul Rahim Muslim Dost (recruiter for Wilayat Khorasan, left in 2015)
- Yunis Hunnar (Leader of the Sheikh Omar Hadid Brigade, killed in June 2015)
- Bajro Ikanović (Senior leader and trainer, killed in February 2016)
- Abu Atheer Amr al-Absi (governor of Aleppo province and coordinator of the Islamic State's media operations, killed in March 2016)
- Abu Ali al-Anbari, (Deputy leader of IS, killed in March 2016)
- Abu Waheeb (commander in Al Anbar, Iraq; killed in May 2016)
- Abu Omar al-Shishani (field commander in Syria, killed in July 2016)
- Abu Wardah, (senior leader in Sulawesi, Indonesia, killed in July 2016)
- Hafiz Saeed Khan, (Leader of Islamic State – Khorasan Province, killed in July 2016)
- Abu Mohammad al-Adnani, (official spokesperson and senior leader, killed in August 2016)
- Salim Mubarok Attamimi or Salim Mobarok al-Tamimin, known by his nom de guerre Abu Jandal al-Yemeni al Indonesi, ISIS leader and recuitrer, died in fighting in Mosul on 5 November 2016.
- Rustam Asildarov, (Leader of Islamic State – Caucasus Province, killed in December 2016)
- Abu Jandal al-Kuwaiti, (second-in-command in Syria, Kuwaiti, killed in December 2016)
- Ahmad Abousamra, (chief editor of Dabiq, killed near al-Thawrah, Syria in January 2017)
- Zainuri Kamaruddin, (Malaysian commander of Katibah Nusantara, killed in Raqqa in January 2017)
- Abu Bilal al-Harbi, (governor of Islamic State – Yemen Province, killed in March 2017)
- Abu Muhammad al Indonesi, also known as Bahrumsyah, Indonesian commander of South-East Asian militants who appeared in a recruitment video in which he urges to migrate to the Islamic State and join the ranks in Indonesia. He was killed on 13 March 2017 in a suicide attack against Syrian Arab Army in Palmyra. The Pentagon doesn't confirm his death.
- Abdul Haseeb Logari, (governor of Islamic State – Khorasan Province, killed in April 2017 in US special forces raid)
- Turki al-Binali, (Bahraini Islamic scholar & top religious adviser, killed in May 2017 in Raqqa, Syria)
- Lavdrim Muhaxheri, (Albanian commander, killed in June 2017 in Syria)
- Abu Khattab al-Tunisi, (third-highest ranking commander in Syria, killed in June 2017 in Raqqa)
- Abdul Rahman Ghaleb, (governor of Islamic State – Khorasan Province, killed in July 2017 in Kunar Province, Afghanistan)
- Abu Bakr al-Qahtani, (Killed in an airstrike on 11 August 2017)
- Gulmurod Khalimov, (Tajik commander and recruiter, killed near Deir ez-Zor, Syria on 3 September 2017)
- Abu Muhammad al-Shimali, (key facilitator for foreign fighters, killed near Deir ez-Zor, Syria on 3 September 2017)
- Isnilon Hapilon, (leader of Abu Sayyaf / IS "Province" of the Philippines, killed in Marawi, Philippines on 16 October 2017)
- Aqsa Mahmood (born 1993) (senior female recruiter, Scottish-Albanian-American.)
- Zulfi Hoxha – "Abu Hamza al-Amriki" (born 1992), senior commander and recruiter, active in Syria and Iraq (since 2015), Albanian-American, allegedly killed in 2018.
- Abu Osama al-Masri, (Leader of Islamic State – Sinai Province, killed on 15 November 2018)
- Ali Moussa al-Shawakh – "Abu Luqman" (born 1973), governor of Raqqah, active in Syria (since 2011), Syrian, reportedly killed by an Iraqi airstrike on 17 April 2018
- Bahrun Naim, (Indonesian commander, killed in Ash Shafa, Syria on 8 June 2018)
- Mohamed Mahmoud – "Abu Usama al-Gharib" (Egyptian-Austrian leader, killed in Syria on 28 November 2018)
- Abu Bakr al-Baghdadi (Founder and Leader, killed on 27 October 2019)
- Abul-Hasan al-Muhajir (Spokesman and senior leader, named as a possible successor for al-Baghdadi; killed in an airstrike on 27 October 2019)
- Hatib Hajan Sawadjaan, (Leader of Abu Sayyaf / IS "Province" of the Philippines, killed on 6 July 2020)
- Abdul Qader al-Najdi, (Leader of Islamic State in Libya, killed on 23 September 2020)
- Aslan Byutukayev, (Chechen commander of Riyad-us Saliheen Brigade of Martyrs / IS "Province" of the Caucasus, killed on 20 January 2021)
- Abu Yasser al-Issawi, (Senior commander claiming to be the leader of the group in Iraq and its "deputy caliph", killed by Iraqi security forces and death announced on 28 January 2021)
- Muhammad Khadir Musa Ramadan, (senior leader and propagandist, killed in 2021)
- Abubakar Shekau, (Leader of Boko Haram, killed on 19 May 2021)
- Adnan Abu Walid al-Sahrawi, (Leader of Islamic State in the Greater Sahara, killed on 17 August 2021)
- Abu Musab al-Barnawi, (Leader of Islamic State in West Africa, killed in August 2021)
- Ali Kalora, (Leader of East Indonesia Mujahideen, killed on 18 September 2021)
- Malam Bako, (Leader of Islamic State in West Africa, killed in October 2021)
- Abu Hamza al-Qurashi, (spokesman and former nasheed singer, killed on 7 November 2021)
- Abu Ibrahim al-Hashimi al-Qurashi, (Leader, killed on 3 February 2022)
- Sani Shuwaram, (Leading commander of the Islamic State in West Africa, killed in February 2022)
- Maher al-Agal, (Leader of IS in Syria, killed in July 2022)
- Abu al-Hasan al-Hashimi al-Qurashi (Leader, killed on 15 October 2022)
- Anas Sharkas – "Abu Ali al-Shishani" (Battalion commander, Syrian, killed in December 2022)
- Hamza Adel Mohammad al-Zamili (AKA Abu Kazem al-Maqdisi, 1992-2022) allegedly the second-highest official in the Sinai Province.
- Hamza al-Homsi (Senior leader, Syrian, killed in February 2023)
- Abu al-Hussein al-Husseini al-Qurashi (Leader, killed on 29 April 2023)
- Abu Ali al-Tunisi (leader of manufacturing for IS in Iraq, killed on 29 August 2024)
- Daham Mohammed Alawi, also known as Abu Saeed al-Dandoushi, was the self-proclaimed governor of Kirkuk, killed on 7 February 2025 in an airstrike targeting the Zarka area on the border between Saladin and Kirkuk. It resulted in the deaths of seven IS operatives, including two other senior figures.
- Abu Khadija, also known as Abdallah Makki Muslih al-Rifai, was the Deputy caliph of IS and governor of IS Syria and Iraq operations, killed in a US airstrike on 13 March 2025.
- Abu-Bilal al-Minuki, senior leader of IS in West Africa. Killed in Nigeria on 15 May 2026.
- Ali Husayn al-'Ulaywi, senior leader of IS. Killed in Syria on 19 June 2026.
- Abu Hudhayfah al-Ansari, Spokesman since 3 August 2023. Killed in Yemen on 1 September 2026 in a joint operation carried out by Yemen's counterterrorism forces and the Saudi-led coalition.

=== Other personnel killed or captured ===
- Abdul Hadi Daghlas (al-Zarqawi's top Lieutenant, killed in 2003)
- Abu Anas al-Shami (Strategist, and al-Zarqawi's adviser, killed in 2004)
- Abu Azzam (killed in 2005)
- Sheik Abd-Al-Rahman (killed in 2006)
- Abu Yaqub al-Masri (killed in 2007)
- Haitham al-Badri (killed in 2007)
- Mahir al-Zubaydi (killed in 2008)
- Mohamed Moumou (killed in 2008)
- Huthaifa al-Batawi (killed in 2011)
- Ifthekar Jaman, a British foreign fighter killed in December 2013
- Abu Usamah al-Maghrebi, (military commander, killed in March 2014)
- Zakaryah Raad (1992-2014), fighter, died in June 2014 fighting with IS in the Middle East.
- Salahedin Ghaitun, known by his nom de guerre Abou Tamima, fighter, died on 15 July 2014 from a gun wound in the head.
- Abu Mosa, press officer, was killed on 22 August 2014 in an attack for al-Tabqa air base in Raqqa Governorate during the Syrian Civil War.
- Douglas McCain (killed in August 2014)
- Noureddine El Mejdoubi, known as Issa Abu, fighter, was arrested and imprisoned in Nanclares.
- Hassan Saeed al-Jabouri (replacement Mosul Governor, killed in 2014)
- Abdul Ghameed Abbas, known as Abu Bakr al-Swedi, IS Swedish fighter who died on November 2014 in al-Ramadi, Iraq from an air strike. He was born in Göteborg and grew up in Bergsjön. He married Khadijah Dare and got a child.
- Abu Jurnas (Mosul Governor, killed in December 2014)
- Bastian Vasquez, known by his nom de guerre Abu Safiyyah, propagandist, died between January and May in an infighting incident.
- Jake Bilardi (killed in Iraq in 2015)
- Ahmed al-Ruwaysi (killed in Sirte, Libya in 2015)
- Maher Meshaal, also known as Abu al-Zubayr al-Jazrawi, Saudi nasheed singer killed in July 2015
- Selim Suleiman al-Haram (a leader of Egypt branch, killed in 2015)
- Yusuf al-Hindi (former IS leader in India, killed in 2015)
- Junaid Hussain (recruiter and hacker, killed in August 2015)
- Reyaad Khan, known by the nom de guerre Abu Dujana al Hindi (1994-21 August 2015), was an ISIS militant from Cardiff who appeared in a video entitled There's No Life Without Jihad. He died on 21 August 2015 from a drone strike in Syria.
- Mohammed Emwazi, nicknamed "Jihadi John" (participant in beheading videos; killed on 12 November 2015 in Raqqa in a US air strike)
- Ismail Omar Mostefai, Samy Amimour, Brahim Abdeslam, Bilal Hadfi, Ahmad Al Mohammad and M. al-Mahmod were the perpetrators of the November 2015 Paris attacks, who died the same day, on 14 November 2015. Abdelhamid Abaaoud, mastermind and perpetrator of the attacks, was killed on 18 November 2015 alongside another perpetrator, Chakib Akrouh, and his cousin Hasna Aitboulahcen.
- Mohamed Hamduch, known as Kokito Castillejos, recruiter and fighter who died in Aleppo on 1 December 2015.
- Waleed Jaseem al-Alwani – "Abu Ahmad al-Alwani", member of Military Shura, Iraqi, killed 27 December 2015.
- Muhammad "Bada" Sajid – (former Indian Mujahideen member, IS recruiter, killed in Syria in 2015)
- Abdullah Elmir, also known as Ginger Jihad (1997-December 2015), was an Australian student from Bankstown, Western Sydney, who left his country at the end of June 2014 to go to Syria with another student to joinn Islamic State. He appeared in two ISIS videos, one of them threating Tony Abbott and any nation. He is believed to have died in a bombing raid on December 2015 in Syria, but the Department of Foreign Affairs and Trade says it is unable to confirm
- Raphael Hostey (British recruiter and fighter, killed on May 5, 2016)
- Ali Aswad al-Jiburi (member of Shura council, killed on May 18, 2016)
- Abu al-Harith (Sudanese IS preacher and leader of Sirte branch, killed in Sirte, Libya in June 2016)
- Oumar Diaw, also known as Abou Barrou or Abu Baroo (1982-2016), jihadist and recruiter. He was from Schiltigheim, moved to Syria in 2014, and died in July 2016.
- Nadir Abu Khalid (Dagestani preacher)
- Ezzit Raad, kwnown by the nom de guerre Abu Mansur al-Muhajir, Australian Islamic State fighter who died during Manbij offensive in 2016, and was previously convicted over a terror plot in Melbourne. His brother Ahmed was also radicalised.
- Abu Muhammad al-Furqan (IS information minister, killed in September 2016 in Raqqa)
- Abu Mujahid al-Faransi
- Abdullah Abu Muhammad was a well-known Salafi preacher in the Russian-speaking environment. He composed and performed two nasheeds: "Soon, very soon" and "He is Allah". Killed in December 2016.
- Muhammad Yasin Ahram Pérez (1995-2019), known as Abu Lais Al Qurtubí, propagandist after the 2017 Barcelona attacks. His mother Tomasa Pérez Molleja accompanied his six sons to Syria to join ISIL, where she died.
- Abu Saifullah al-Shishani (died 21 December 2016 or in June 2017) (Chechen IS suicide bomber who attacked ISF in eastern Mosul)
- Abu Rumaysah (born 1983) (British fighter, possibly killed in 2017)
- Abu Anas al-Iraqi, (Finance chief of IS, killed in a Delta Force raid at Dez ez-Zor in January 2017)
- Ridvan Haqifi (1990–2017), commander and recruiter, active in Syria and Iraq, Kosovo Albanian. Killed on 8 February 2017.
- Abu-Zakariya al-Britani, born Ronald Fiddler and also known as Jamal Udeen Al-Harith, was an IS fighter and suicide bomber who blew himself up in a village south of Mosul. He was previously freed from Guantanamo Bay detention camp.
- Abu Umar al-Almani (1986-2017), commander and recruiter, German. Killed on 25 March 2017.
- Muhammad Wanndy Mohamed Jedi, (Senior Indonesian Leader, killed in April 2017)
- Abu Maliha al-Kanadi, suicide bomber from Canada who died in May 2017 in Ninawa Province.
- Fawaz Muhammad Jubayr al-Rawi (Facilitator, killed in a US airstrike at Abu Kamal on 16 June 2017)
- Ahmad Medinsky (Dagestani preacher, killed in June 2017)
- Sally-Anne Jones – "Umm Hussain al-Britani" (1968–2017), recruiter, British. Killed in June 2017.
- Abu Osama al-Tunisi, IS commander who died on 25 July 2017 from an airstrike in Raqqah.
- Khaled Sharrouf, foreign fighter who was presumably killed in air strike on 11 August 2017.
- Yahya al-Bahrumi – (American fighter, killed in October 2017)
- Akhmed Chatayev (1980–2017), trainer and organizer of activity against Russian diplomatic missions, Chechnyan. Killed on 22 November 2017 in Tbilisi by Georgian security forces.
- Abu Natheer al-Muhajir – (deputy emir of the Salahuddin Province, killed on 25 November 2017)
- Abu Shu'ayb as-Somali or Abu Shuayb al-Somali, born Sayid Hussein Feisal Ali Warabe in 1991, traveled from Finland to Syria to become a jihadi fighter. He was killed in an airstrike on 29 December 2017 in Syria.
- Denis Cuspert – "Abu Talha al-Almani" (1975–2018), German recruiter active since 2013. Killed in Gharanij, Syria on 17 January 2018.
- "The Beatles", hostage torturers and executioners, British.
- Sabri Essid (1984-4 February 2018), Islamic State fighter convicted of killing, raping and enslaving Yazidis. He died on 4 February 2018 after he stepped a landmine.
- Maxime Hauchard, known by his nom de guerre Abou Abdallah al-Faransi (1992-2018), was an ISIS executioner, He died in March 2018.
- Qari Hekmat – (High-ranking commander of IS's Afghan franchise in the northern province of Jowzjan, killed on 7 April 2018)
- Nasser Abu Zaqul – (Central Sinai commander of the Islamic State, killed on 18 April 2018)
- Abu Huzeifa al-Iraqi – (High-ranking IS commander, killed in April 2018)
- Abu Walid al-Shishany – (close aid and right-hand man to Baghdadi, killed on 20 April 2018)
- Qari Zahid – (Key Islamic State commander also known as Perai, killed on 24 April 2018)
- Saleh Nasser Fadhl al-Bakshi – (senior Islamic State commander; also known as the "Prince" for the Aden area; killed on 28 April 2018)
- Imad Jibar, fighter, was arrested in Turkey.
- Bahrumsyah – (senior South-Asian commander and highest ranking Indonesian to fight with the IS; reported killed in April 2018)
- Khaled al-Loweizi – (IS member, arrested on 3 May 2018)
- Tareq Kamleh – (foreign recruiter, killed on 8 June 2018)
- Abu Yasser, Iraqi nasheed singer disappeared in July 2018
- Mufti Nemat – (leading IS commander in northern Afghanistan, surrendered on 1 August 2018)
- Mahad Moalim – (senior Islamic State commander in Somalia, killed on 23 October 2018)
- Christian Emde — (German Commander, killed in late 2018)
- Khallad al-Qahtani, Saudi nasheed singer killed in late 2018
- Shamima Begum – (British fighter, captured in February 2019)
- Fabien Clain (Abu Anas al-Faransi), French IS media worker killed in Syria on 20 February 2019
- Jean-Michel Clain (Abu Uthman al-Faransi), brother of the previous one and nasheed singer. Killed in Syria on 22 February 2019
- Umm Hamza – (former Leader of Al-Khansaa Brigade, surrendered on 24 February 2019)
- Akel Zainal — (Malaysian fighter, killed in March 2019)
- Mullah Krekar, Norwegian recruiter and leader of Rawti Shax who was arrested on 16 July 2019
- Portuguese Islamic State Network, formed by eight members including Rómulo Costa, Cassimo Turé, Sadjo Turé, Edgar Costa, Celso Costa, Sandro Marques, and Fábio Poças, killed or captured between 2015 and 2019.
- Abu al-Ward al-Iraqi – (IS Oil Official, killed in raid in Deir al-Zour province on 14 January 2020)
- Abdel-Majed Abdel Bary, foreign fighter and recruiter who was captured in Almería, Spain on 21 April 2020 and died in prison. He planned to lead a terrorist cell in Europe.
- Bilal al-Sudani (killed in northern Somalia on January 25, 2023)
- Andre Richard Omer Poulin, known by his nom de guerre Abu Muslim, was a foreign fighter from Timmins, Ontario, who joined the fight in Syria in 2012 and recruited other jihadists.
- Kevin Chassin, known by the nom de guerre Abu Maryam al-Faransi, militant who threatened France and died on a suicide attack in Iraq.
- Fatlum Shalaku, known by the nom de guerre Abu Musa al-Britani, body builder and Islamic State suicide bomber who carried out an attack on Iraqi forces in Ramadi, Anbar province in May 2015. He studied at Holland Park School. His brother Flamur also joined ISIL and died in Iraq in March 2015.
- Abu Abdul Aziz al-Faransi, IS militant who blew up himself in Haditha on 22 May 2015.
- Kujtim Fejzulai, known by the nom de guerre Abu Dagnah al-Albany, IS sympathizer who carried out the Vienna attack on 2 November 2020.
- Abu Obaida, also known as Abu Obida or Abu Obeida, a senior IS leader who was the chief of the Hisbah patrol in Raqqa, and he was arrested on 18 August 2021 in Khalis, Iraq by Iraqi special intelligence.
- Abu 'Uqayl from Singapore, also known as Megat Shahdan bin Abdul Samad (1978-2021), is an IS fighter who travelled to Syria. Internal Security Department said it is believed he was killed in a conflict zone.
- Khalil Abdullah al-Khalif, also known as Khaled Iyad Ahmad al-Jabouri, a senior IS operative was killed on April 3, 2023.
- Surat Gul, also known as Saifullah Peshawari, Islamic State Khorasan leader killed on 11 February 2024 in Khyber Pakhtunkhwa.
- Abu Aisha al-Omari, fighter and perpetrator of Shah Cheragh attack who died on the scene.
- Quentin Le Brun, known by his nom de guerre Abu Osama al-Faranci, French combatant and propagandist.
- Othman Garrido, known by his nom de guerre Abu Salman al-Faranci (born 1994), ISIS fighter who was sentenced in September 2026 by the French court to 30 years in prison.
- Romain Garnier, known by his nom de guerre Abou Salman al-Faransi (b. 1987), a former swimming champion from Vesoul who joined ISIL in 2014 with other people. He was arrested in the Hassakeh area. His father is named Frédéric Garnier.

== See also ==
- List of leaders of the Islamic State
- Brussels Islamic State terror cell
- The Beatles (terrorist cell)
- List of al-Qaeda members

== Sources ==
"Treasury Sanctions Major Islamic State of Iraq and the Levant Leaders, Financial Figures, Facilitators, and Supporters". 29 September 2015.
