= Siege of Kobanî =

2014 IS offensive in northern Syria during the Syrian Civil War

Coordinates: 36.8897°N 38.3556°E

- Part of the Syrian Civil War, Rojava-Islamist conflict, and the American-led intervention in the Syrian Civil War
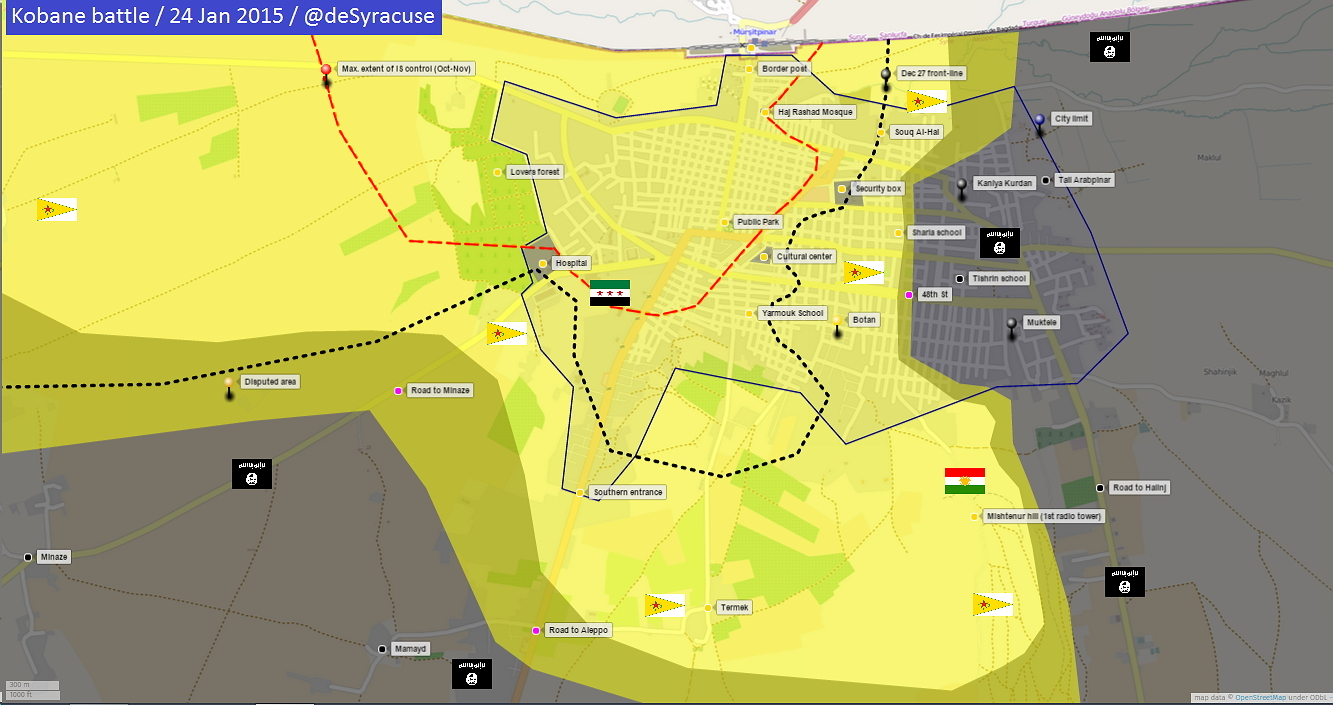
- A map showing the progression of the siege of Kobanî, from October 2014 to January 2015
Date	15 September 2014 – 20 March 2015 (6 months and 1 week)
Location	Kobanî (Ayn al-Arab), Kobanî Canton, Syria
Result	Rojava Federation victory
Territorial changes	IS initially captured 350 villages and towns in the Kobanî Canton and entered Kobanî city by early October 2014, seizing 60% of it by early November 2014; YPG-led forces recapture the whole of Kobanî city in late January 2015, and almost all of the villages previously lost in the Kobanî region by mid-March 2015; 70% of Kobanî city was destroyed in the battle; YPG-led forces launch an offensive on Sarrin on 20 March 2015; Turning point in coalition Rojava-Islamist conflict, and eventual military destruction of IS-held territory

Belligerents
Rojava; PKK; Kurdistan Region (from 30 October); Free Syrian Army; CJTF-OIR: United States; Jordan; United Arab Emirates; Saudi Arabia; Qatar	Islamic State

Commanders and leaders
Salih Muslim Muhammad; Narin Afrin; Mahmud Berxwedan; Ismet Sheikh Hassan; Meryem Kobani; Hebun Sinya †; Faisal Saadoun ("Abu Layla"); Muhammad Mustafa Ali ("Abu Adel"); Hasan al-Banawi ("Abu Juma") (from 18 November 2014); Abdul Qader Sheikh Muhammad ("Abdo Dushka"); Saleh Ali ("Abu Furat") †; Nizar al-Khatib ("Abu Laith") (until 18 November 2014)	Abu Ayman al-Iraqi (Head of Military Shura); Abu Ali al-Anbari (Deputy, Syria); Abu Omar al-Shishani (Field commander in Syria); Abdul Nasser Qardash (Deputy emir of the Delegated Committee); Abu Ali al-Askari † (IS senior commander); Abu Mohammed al-Masri † (IS senior commander); Abu Khattab al-Kurdi † (Commander); Othman al-Nazih †; Sultan al-Safri al-Harbi †; Hassan Aboud Akhmed Chatayev

Units involved
Euphrates Volcano; YPG; KFP volunteers; YPJ; Dawn of Freedom Brigades; Northern Sun Battalion; Kurdish Front; Raqqa Revolutionaries' Brigade; Retribution Army; Jarabulus Company; Peshmerga; PKK; HPG; YJA STAR; MLKP; TKP/ML TİKKO; United Freedom Forces; People's Liberation Faction (until January 2015); CJTF-OIR; United States; 9th Bomb Squadron	Military of IS; Wilayat Halab; Liwa Dawud; Badr Katiba

Strength
1,500–2,000 YPG & YPJ (Kurdish claims as of 1 November 2014); 600 PKK; 300 FSA (originally) 50–200 FSA (reinforcements)	9,000+ fighters (Kurdish claims); 30–50 MBTs; 2 UAVs

Casualties and losses
YPG & YPJ: 562–741 killed (3 MLKP); FSA and Jabhat al-Akrad: 29–72 killed Peshmerga: 1 killed (accident)	1,422^{[*]}–2,000 killed (per SOHR); 2,000+^{[**]} killed (per U.S.); 1,068–5,000^{[**]} killed, 18 tanks destroyed 2 drones shot down (per Kurds)
- Hundreds of civilians killed Over 400,000 civilians fled to Turkey
- ^{*} Additional hundreds of deaths by airstrikes^{**} 1,000+ by US-led Coalition airstrikes

The siege of Kobanî was launched by the Islamic State (IS) on 13 September 2014, in order to capture the Kobanî Canton and its main city of Kobanî (also known as Kobanê or Ayn al-Arab) in northern Syria, in the de facto autonomous region of Rojava.

By 2 October 2014, IS succeeded in capturing 350 Kurdish villages and towns in the vicinity of Kobanê, generating a wave of some 300,000 Kurdish refugees, who fled across the border into Turkey's Şanlıurfa Province. By January 2015, the number had risen to 400,000. The Kurdish People's Protection Units (YPG) and some Free Syrian Army (FSA) factions (under the Euphrates Volcano joint operations room), Peshmerga of the Kurdistan Regional Government, and American and US-allied Arab militaries' airstrikes began to recapture Kobane.

On 26 January 2015, the YPG and its allies, backed by the continued US-led airstrikes, began to retake the city, driving IS into a steady retreat. The city of Kobanê was fully recaptured on 27 January; however, most of the remaining villages in the Kobanê Canton remained under IS control. The YPG and its allies then made rapid advances in rural Kobanî, with IS withdrawing 25 km from the city of Kobanî by 2 February. By late April 2015, IS had been driven out of almost all of the villages it had captured in the Canton, but maintained control of a few dozen villages it seized in the northwestern part of the Raqqa Governorate. In late June 2015, IS launched a new offensive against the city, killing at least 233 civilians, but were quickly driven back.

The battle for Kobanî was considered a turning point in the war against Islamic State. The siege was referred by some to be the "Kurdish Stalingrad".

== Background ==
During the Syrian Civil War, the People's Protection Units (YPG) took over Kobanî (Arabic: Ayn al-Arab) on 19 July 2012. Since then, the city has been under Kurdish control, while the YPG and Kurdish politicians exercise autonomy for what they call Rojava.

In August 2013, Islamic State, the al-Nusra Front, Ahrar al-Sham, the Suqour al-Sham Brigade, and the al-Tawhid Brigade announced that they would besiege Kobanî. However, infighting between the groups erupted in January 2014 and some of them began to align with the YPG under the name of the Euphrates Islamic Liberation Front. In March 2014, IS captured Sarrin and several other towns and villages from the YPG and the EILF. Clashes continued through May.

On 2 July 2014, the city and the surrounding villages came under attack from IS.

== IS advance ==
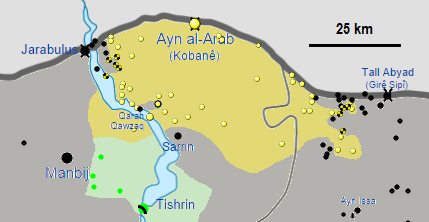
The situation at the beginning of IS's offensive against Kobanî, on 15 September 2014 Controlled by Kurdish forces Controlled by the Syrian opposition Controlled by Islamic State

On 15 September 2014, IS launched a massive offensive to take the Kobanî Canton and the city of Kobanî, pushing into the villages at the western and eastern borders of the Canton. On 17 September 2014, following the capture of a strategic bridge over the Euphrates on 16 September, IS launched a large offensive using tanks, rockets and artillery in the direction of Kobanî, and within 24 hours, captured 21 villages. The advance left Kobanî encircled by IS forces, and it also forced the remaining Free Syrian Army fighters to the southwest of the Kobanî Canton to retreat to the city of Kobanî. Two days later, IS captured 39 more villages, bringing their forces within 20 kilometers of Kobanî. 45,000 refugees crossed into Turkey, fearing an IS takeover of the region, while a number of refugees were stopped at the border and ordered to return to Kobanî by Turkish authorities. The inhabitants of 100 villages were evacuated after coming under continuous shelling, and dozens of civilians and YPG fighters were killed as the IS advance continued.

On 20 September, IS forces came within 15 kilometers of the city of Kobanî after capturing three more villages, and started bombarding areas within 10 kilometers of the city. Meanwhile, more than 300 Kurdish fighters reached Kobanî from Turkey as reinforcements. Senior Kurdistan Workers' Party (PKK) official Murat Karayilan appealed to Kurdish youth in Turkey to join Kurdish forces in Syria. During the day, three rockets exploded within Kobanî, spreading fear among its inhabitants. Since the start of the offensive, 34 civilians had been killed, while the number of refugees had reached 60,000.

By 21 September, IS militants captured 64 villages; 39 IS and 27 Kurdish fighters had been killed in the previous 48 hours. Kurdish forces evacuated at least 100 villages on the Syrian side after IS militants began their offensive against the Kurdish villages. IS troops came within 10 kilometers of the city and continued to advance, with the fighting concentrated in the southern and eastern suburbs of Kobanî, 13 kilometers from the city proper. The next day, a Kurdish spokesman reported that the IS advance east of the city had been halted during the previous night. Despite the stalled advance, IS forces shelled the center of the city, and clashes continued in the vicinity of the village of Mojik (about 6 km west of Kobanî) and the village of Alishar (7 km east of Kobanî). On the same day, Turkish Deputy Prime Minister Numan Kurtulmus said that more than 130,000 Syrian Kurds fled across the border into Turkey, escaping an advance by IS jihadists.

On 24 September, IS forces continued their advance south of the city. This brought IS within 8 kilometers of the south of Kobanî, the closest they had been to the city since the offensive started on 15 September. IS had increased its forces in the Kobanî Canton to at least 4,000 by this time. During the advance, IS forces captured the villages of Robey and Tall Ghazal, and the nearby grain silos. In addition, an IS source claimed that their forces had also captured several villages to the west of Kobanî. The front line to the west had moved to the cluster of villages called Siftek, as more IS fighters and tanks arrived for the offensive during the previous day. The next morning, IS fighters were only 2 kilometers away, as clashes were continuing. By this point, IS controlled 75 percent of the Kobanî canton, while Kurdish forces only had control of the city of Kobanî, the smaller town of Shera, and around 15 villages nearby.

On 26 September, IS troops captured a hill from which YPG fighters had been attacking them in recent days, 10 km (6 miles) west of Kobanî. IS also captured a village about 7 km to the east of Kobanî.

=== Coalition airstrikes and Kobanî besieged ===
Map showing the evolution of the siege of Kobanî, 2014: 1 March 18 September 21 September 24 September

On 27 September, US-led coalition planes bombed the area around Kobanî for the first time, targeting positions in the village of Alishar, 4 kilometers from the city, which was used as a command and control center by IS. Despite the coalition airstrikes against frontline IS positions, they were still able to begin shelling the city of Kobanî, wounding several people. The US' initial reluctance to launch airstrikes to help the Kurdish city was believed be caused by its unwillingness to upset Turkey, who preferred a Kurdish defeat.

By 28 September, 1,500 Kurdish fighters coming from Turkey reinforced the Kurds in Kobanî. The next day, IS forces approaching from the south and the southeast came within 5 kilometers of the city, while Kobanî faced sustained bombardment for a second day. The next day, IS troops approaching from the east advanced within 2–3 kilometers of Kobanî. During the fighting, the Kurds reportedly destroyed two IS tanks. IS fighters also captured the village of Siftek, to the west, and used it to stage attacks on Kobanî itself. The village of Kazikan was also captured.

On 1 October, Islamic State forces advanced southeast of Kobanî and on the western front, from where Kurdish forces retreated. This resulted in IS troops capturing one of the final villages on the outskirts of Kobanî, and approaching to within one kilometer of the town's entrance. At this point, Kurdish fighters in Kobanî were reinforcing their positions with sandbags to prepare for potential house-to-house fighting. By evening, amid a sharp shortage of weapons, Kurdish forces withdrew from the city suburbs, as IS forces continued their advance. As IS forces entered the suburbs of Kobanî, some refugees reported torture, rape, murder, and mutilation at the hands of IS. IS militants were reportedly beheading Kurdish fighters, including women.

By 2 October, IS forces had captured 350 of the 354 villages around Kobanî, and were positioned only hundreds of meters to the south and southeast of the city. Intense firefights had erupted that day, resulting in 57 IS deaths in the east of the city, while an Iraqi IS commander and eight other militants were killed in the southern sector.

The next day, IS militants took control of Kobanî's southern and eastern entrances and exits. They had also taken a strategic hill and a radio tower, which overlooked the town. Later, a Kurdish fighter reported that IS militants had entered the city's southwestern fringes, and that fighting was ongoing. The US-led coalition conducted at least seven air sorties against IS targets around Kobanî within five days, until 2 October, when the US didn't carry out any strikes, before reportedly carrying out further strikes late on 3 October. During the night of 3/4 October, an IS attempt to breach the city was repelled. Coalition airstrikes continued on 4 October, targeting IS logistics, units, artillery positions, and a personnel carrier. By this point, the city was essentially empty, as nearly all residents, except the defenders, fled to Turkey. The last foreign journalist also left on 4 October. In all, some 90% of the region's population had evacuated.

== Battle for Kobanî city ==
=== Fighting in Kobanî ===
==== First week ====
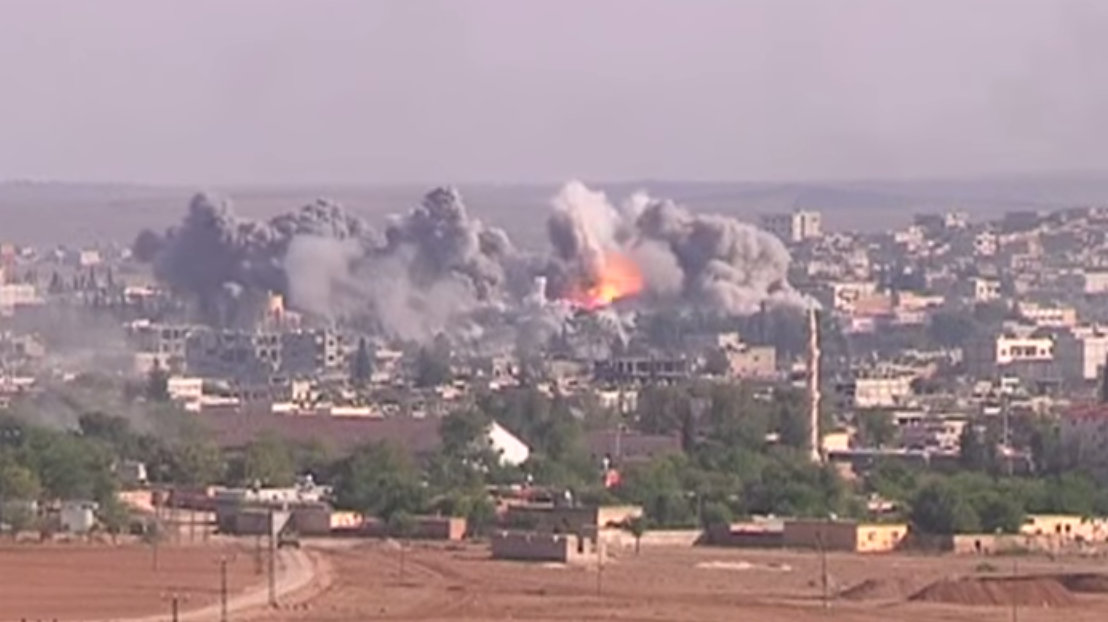
Coalition airstrike in Kobanî on Islamic State position, October 2014

On 5 October, IS managed to capture the southern side of Mistanour Hill outside Kobanî city, and a Kurdish activist said if IS captured the hill, it would give them easy access to the city. The clashes at Mistanour involved hand-to-hand fighting. For the first time, a Kurdish female fighter (Deilar Kanj Khamis, also known by the nom de guerre Arin Mirkan) blew herself up in a suicide attack on an IS position, killing 10 IS fighters. Later, after seizing full control of Mistanour Hill, IS militants entered the southeastern edge of Kobanî, and street-to-street fighting began. This was the first time the jihadists had entered the city proper itself. IS managed to break through Kurdish defenses, after 30 of their fighters raced across the open fields at the city's eastern edges. The IS fighters were backed up by snipers, heavy machine gun fire, and shelling from Mistanour Hill.

On 6 October, the jihadists penetrated about 100 meters into the city, and an IS flag was raised on top of a four-story building in southeastern Kobanî, shortly after which another was raised on top of the nearby Mistanour Hill that had been captured the previous day. By this time, the number of IS militants deployed to the Kobanî Canton had increased to 9,000. The militants then made an attempt to advance further, but while entering Street 48, they were ambushed by People's Protection Units (YPG) fighters, and 20 jihadists were killed. Throughout the day, fighting raged for control of the Maqtala al-Jadida and Qani Arab districts, which ended with IS forces capturing both neighborhoods, as well as the industrial zone of Kobanî.

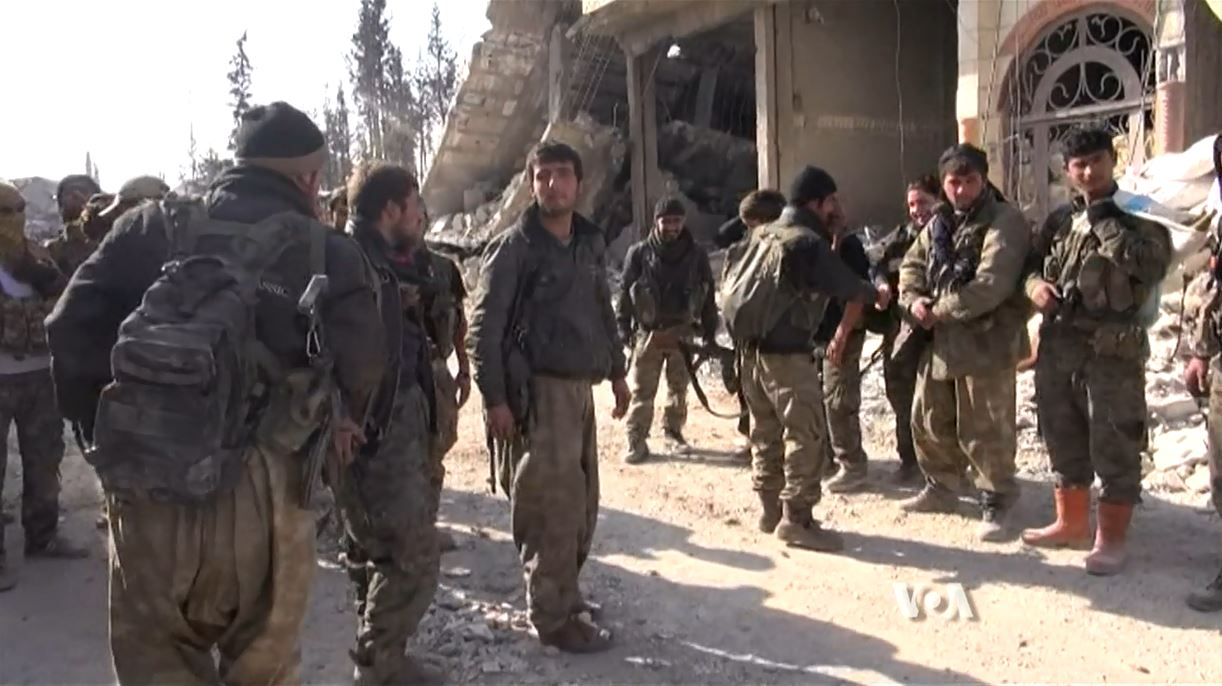
YPG fighters during the battle

By the morning of 7 October, Kurdish forces managed to expel IS fighters from most of the eastern part of Kobanî that they had captured during the previous night, although IS fighters were still present in parts of the eastern neighborhoods. Meanwhile, IS forces captured several buildings on the southern side of the city, as well as a hospital under construction on the western side. The Kurdish success in the eastern part of town came after several U.S. airstrikes during the night and morning targeted IS positions and destroyed a tank, three technicals, and an IS unit, and damaged a tank and one technical. IS anti-aircraft artillery was also hit.

On 8 October, Kurdish fighters expelled IS forces from most of their previous gains in the city, following a new round of U.S. airstrikes that targeted the rear positions of the IS fighters. One of the targets hit was a concentration of IS fighters near a mosque in the eastern part of the city. However, despite the airstrikes, the jihadists soon launched a new assault in the eastern part of Kobanî, as IS reinforcements arrived, allowing them to push 50–70 meters west of the industrial zone, capturing the market area. By evening, IS militants had advanced an overall 100 meters towards the city center. Meanwhile, Kurdish fighters captured Sh'ir on the western outskirts of Kobanî.

On 9 October, IS forces were in control of more than a third of the city, including all of the eastern areas, a small part of the northeast, and an area in the southeast. IS also captured the Kurdish police headquarters, which they had targeted the previous night with a large suicide truck-bomb. The clashes in that area left a high-ranking Kurdish police commander dead. The captured police station was then targeted by US-led coalition aircraft and destroyed. To create a smoke screen from coalition planes, IS fighters started setting fire to buildings, and towers of black smoke burned for hours on the top of Mistanour Hill. Later, it was reported that Kurdish fighters made advances against IS in the eastern part of the town, while FSA fighters attacked IS forces from the rear, inflicting heavy losses. According to the Syrian Observatory for Human Rights (SOHR), Kurdish forces managed to besiege a group of IS fighters in the police headquarters. The clashes around the building left 11 IS fighters killed, and four were captured by the Kurds. At this point, Kurdish forces were faced with the risk of running out of ammunition.

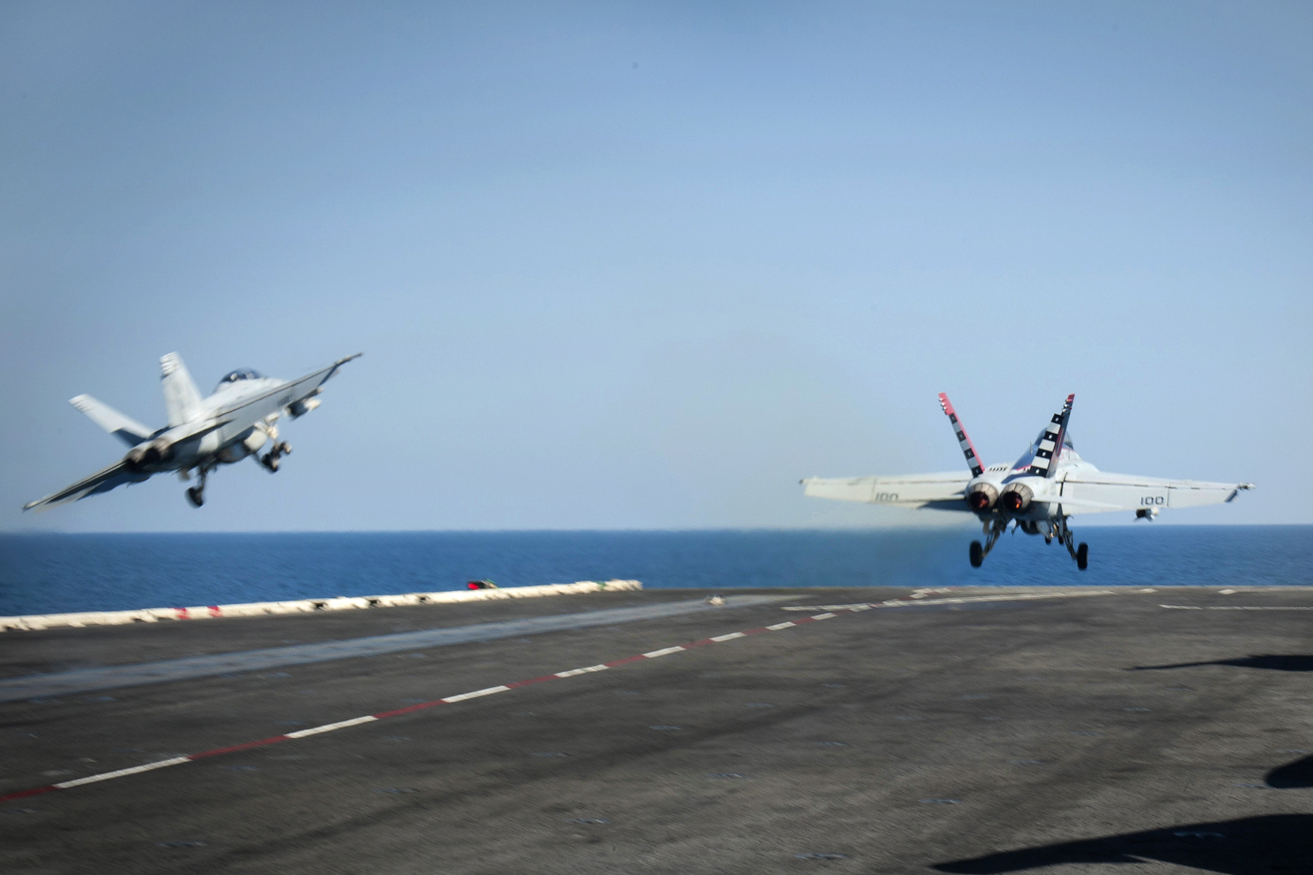
Two U.S. F/A-18F Super Hornets of VFA-22 take off from USS Carl Vinson to support Operation Inherent Resolve, October 2014

On 10 October, IS fighters advanced towards the city center and captured the Kurdish military headquarters, which would potentially allow them to advance on the border post, and thus rout the Kurdish forces inside Kobanî. With the capture of the headquarters, IS was in control of 40 percent of the town. For the first time, IS tanks were seen inside the city. Meanwhile, Kurdish and Syrian rebel fighters retreated from Sh'ir hill on the western outskirts, which they had captured two days earlier. In order to avoid coalition airstrikes, IS fighters resorted to transporting new supplies of ammunition to the city by motorcycles, while also flying YPG flags on their vehicles to mislead coalition aircraft. IS militants wearing YPG uniforms began infiltrating Kurdish lines. Later that day, an IS suicide car-bomb exploded near the Grand Mosque, west of the security quarter, which was followed by clashes in an attempt by IS to capture the mosque which would give them a good vantage point for their snipers over a wide area of the city.

On 11 October, IS forces attempted to take the center of Kobanî, but were repelled by YPG forces and American airstrikes on IS positions. Even so, by this point, IS was in control of almost half the city, after securing the area housing administrative and security buildings, and were advancing along the street that divides the eastern and western parts of the town.

==== Second week ====
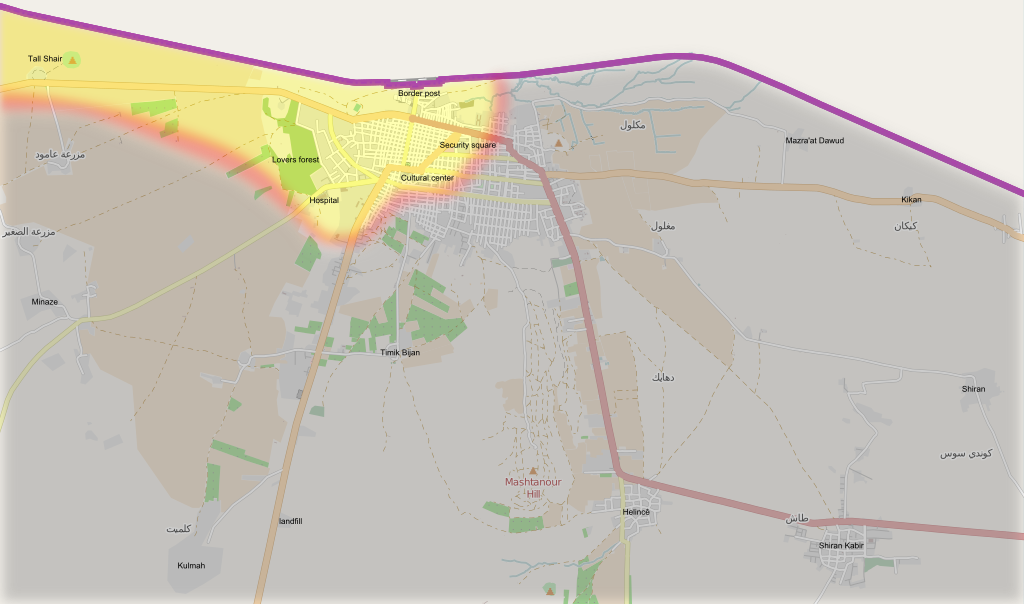
Approximate boundary of the frontline during the fighting in Kobanî, in late October 2014

On 12 October, IS reinforcements were dispatched to the battle after the militants suffered heavy losses during the previous day. IS seized the water wells on the outskirts of Kobanî, although the lack of diesel due to the siege already rendered them useless for the Kurdish fighters and civilians in the city.

On 13 October, IS carried out three suicide bombings against Kurdish positions in Kobanî. One suicide truck-bomber blew himself up in northwest Kobanî, which opened the way for IS forces to advance and capture the New Cultural Center, leaving them in control of 50 percent of Kobanî. A second bomber attempted to reach the border crossing, but his bomb exploded prematurely, and the IS attack on the border crossing was repelled. The third bomber attacked Kurdish forces to the west of the security quarter, who had managed to advance slightly against IS in the area. Kurdish fighters also recaptured some IS positions in the south of the city. According to a Kurdish fighter, if IS took control of the border crossing "it's over." He said that despite Kurdish forces repelling the IS attack on the crossing point, it was "impossible" for them to hold their ground if the same situation continued. A day later, Kurdish fighters recaptured Tall Shair hill, west of Kobanî.

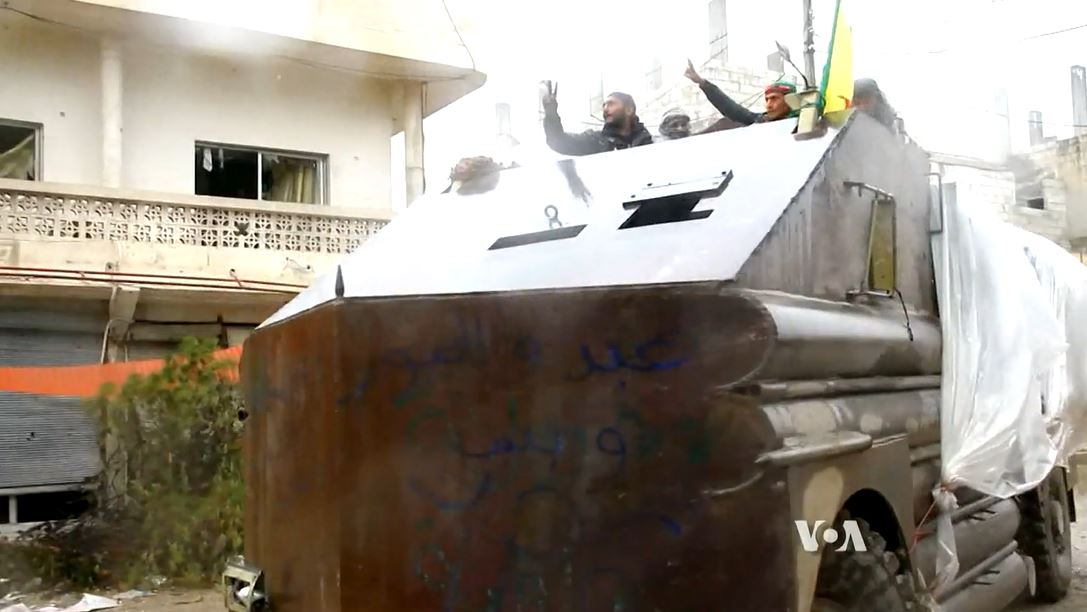
YPG improvised fighting vehicle in Kobanî

From 13 to 15 October, the U.S. conducted 39 airstrikes on IS positions in and around Kobanî, 21 of which occurred on the night of 13 October. This allowed Kurdish fighters to make progress against the jihadists in the IS-held parts of the city. The strikes killed 39 IS fighters. Kurdish forces said that the airstrikes had become much more effective, due to them starting to coordinate with the U.S. by providing them targets for the strikes. The number of strikes had risen to 53 by 17 October.

On 15 October, the deputy head of Kobanî's foreign relations committee claimed that the advances Kurdish forces made left them in control of 80% of the city, which could possibly lead to them regaining control of the town. The next day, Kurdish commander Baharin Kandal told the BBC News that Islamic State fighters had retreated from most of the town, with two areas of continued resistance remaining.

On 18 October, IS launched a fierce new assault from the east towards the border crossing, in an attempt to cut off Kurdish fighters in Kobanî. However, the attack was repulsed while more IS reinforcements were being sent. By this point, IS fighters were still present in the south and east sectors of Kobanî, and were believed to hold around a third of the town. Later, two IS car-bombs exploded, one west of the security quarter, near the municipal building, and the other in the al-Hurreyyi Square, near the IS-held Cultural Center Building. During the day, IS bombarded the city with 41 shells.

==== Third week ====
On 19 October, YPG fighters advanced in the Kani Erban area, where they took over two IS positions, while IS managed to advance, west of the security quarter. The US-led coalition launched six airstrikes on IS positions between 18 and 19 October. Later, 3 U.S. transport aircraft dropped 27 bundles totaling 24 tons of small arms and ammunition, as well as 10 tons of medical supplies that were supplied by Kurdistan Region to the Kurdish fighters defending Kobanî. In a statement released by the U.S. Central Command, it was stated that the airdrops were "intended to enable continued resistance against ISIL's attempts to overtake Kobanî." According to reports, one of the bundles landed in an IS-held area, and was subsequently bombed. Another bundle that landed off target was recovered by Kurdish forces.

Coalition airstrike against IS VBIED near Kobanî, on 21 October 2014

On 20 October, two IS car-bombs exploded in the northern part of the city. A day later, IS militants claimed on social media to have taken hold of at least one cache of the US airdropped supplies, as shown in an uploaded video by IS militants; the cache included hand grenades, ammunition, and rocket-propelled grenade launchers.

On 23 October, IS militants once again captured Tell Sh'ir Hill, after hours of fighting. But the hill was targeted by airstrikes in the evening, and was recaptured by the Kurds later on during the night. The fall of the hill came as a result of a new assault by IS militants that had started the night before and had continued into the next day. The next day, reports from Kobanî suggested that IS fighters may have used an unidentified chemical weapon in the battle for the city.

==== Fourth week ====
On 26 October, IS failed for the fourth time to capture the border gate with Turkey in the northern al-Jomrok neighborhood. The next day, IS released another video with British hostage John Cantlie, in which he claims that the city of Kobanî was mostly under IS control, with only a few pockets of Kurdish resistance remaining. He also claimed that the Battle of Kobanî was "largely over," and that IS forces were mostly mopping up in the city. The captions in the video displaying the Turkish flags at the border, claimed to have been filmed by one of the four IS drones. However, the video has been deemed as pure IS propaganda, especially since analysts claim that it was filmed about a week earlier. Additionally, 200 Iraqi Kurdish forces were expected to arrive in Kobanî as reinforcements, via the Syrian-Turkish border.

On 28 October, a fifth attempt by IS to capture the border crossing was also repelled, while preparations were underway for the Peshmerga to cross the border with Syria from Turkey.

=== FSA and Peshmerga reinforcements arrive ===
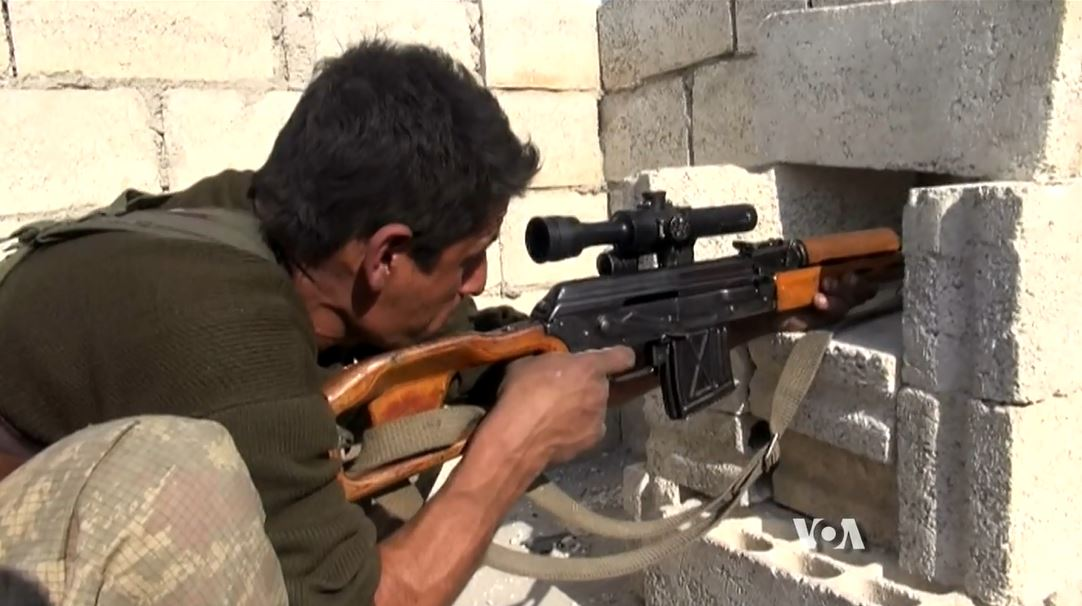
YPG sniper during the siege

On 29 October 50 Syrian Free Syrian Army (FSA) fighters crossed the border from Turkey into Kobanî. Two days later, more than 20 vehicles with Kurdish Peshmerga forces entered the city of Kobanî from Sh'ir Hill in the western countryside of the city. The Iraqi Peshmerga forces numbered around 150, and brought heavy weapons and ammunition. These arrivals marked the first time Turkey allowed ground troops from outside Syria to reinforce the Kurds defending Kobanî.

On 1 November, the People's Protection Units (YPG) advanced towards the al-Haj Rashad Mosque area. A day later, in an interview, FSA commander Abdul-Jabbar Ekada stated that 320 FSA fighters were present in the city, and that IS militants controlled 60% of Kobanî. On the following day, pro-Kurdish news agencies reported that the villages of Arbus, Manaza, Albalur, and Cikur were cleared of IS members.

On 5 November, the Iraqi Kurdish regional government in Erbil delivered several truckloads of ammunition that secretly crossed into Kobanî via Turkey, to help the town's defenders. Also, officials in the town claimed that since the arrival of Peshmerga reinforcements, several IS advances had been halted, resulting in IS losses of "possibly hundreds."

=== YPG and FSA regain ground ===
The situation in Kobanî on 16 November 2014, after the YPG briefly captured the strategic Mistanour Hill. However, the YPG lost control of the hill to IS forces within 4 days, and retook control of the hill on 19 January 2015.

On 8 November, the YPG advanced near the al-Haj Rashad and al-Baladia neighborhoods in Kobanî. Two days later, IS was calling "dozens" of its fighters from other parts of the Aleppo Governorate to participate in the fight for Kobanî, due to the heavy casualties inflicted upon its forces in the fight for control of the town.

On 11 November, the YPG recaptured an undisclosed number of streets and buildings in the southern part of the town. Also, a very important military leader for IS, according to a report by SOHR, said that IS militants were shocked and demoralized by the "fierce resistance" put up by YPG fighters, as they had expected victory within a few days of storming the town. The next day, Kurdish forces cut off a road used as a supply route by IS. The road connects Kobanî with Raqqa, the IS's headquarters. The Kurdish forces managed to cut off the supply route from Raqqa after capturing parts of the strategic Mistanour Hill.

On 16 November, YPG units advanced east of al-Baladia area and north of the Security Square. Two days later, Kurdish fighters captured six buildings which, according to the director at SOHR Rami Abdulrahman, "were in a strategic location in the town's north, close to Security Square where the main municipal offices are based." The Kurds also seized "a large quantity of rocket-propelled grenade launchers, guns and machine gun ammunition." IS launched two attacks the next day; the first was an attempt to recapture the six buildings they had lost the day before, and the second was aimed at the Kobani-Aleppo road to the town's southwest. There were reports of IS casualties. On 17 November, it was also reported that Abu Khattab, one of the IS's commander in Kobanî, had been killed in an ambush set by YPG fighters in the village of Tell Bakr. Also, 28 IS militants were killed in the clashes in Kobanî, including two high-ranking IS commanders, Abu Ali al-Askari and Abu Mohammed al-Masri.

On 20 November, IS forces launched another attack on Mistanour Hill, in another failed attempt to regain control of the parts of Kobanî that they had lost to Kurdish forces. IS also launched another assault east of the border gate.

On 25 November, YPG fighters recaptured several buildings on the outskirts of Kobanî, as well as the cultural center in the town. They also advanced in the governmental square, and east of Azadi yard.

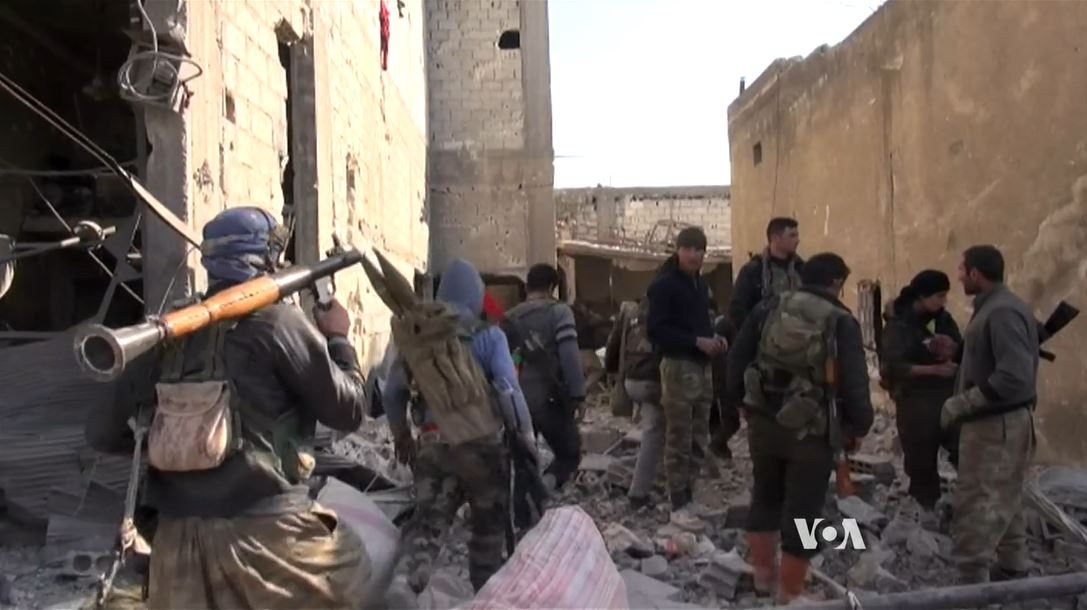
YPG and YPJ fighters in a destroyed part of the town

On 28 November, YPG took the al-Baladia and Azadi yard, as well as Souq al-Hal and the governmental square after IS fighters pulled back from these positions, while an IS reconnaissance drone was shot down above the town. Kurdish fighters captured weapons and ammunition during their advance.

On 29 November, IS launched a counterattack by detonating four suicide cars and explosive belts, following clashes between the two parties in the town. According to the SOHR, eight YPG fighters and 17 IS fighters were killed in the clashes. It also reported that IS took back the Azadi yard from the YPG, after losing it the previous day. According to the German news outlet 'Der Spiegel', IS fighters also attacked YPG positions near the border gate from Turkish soil. According to the SOHR, YPG fighters crossed the Turkish border and attacked IS positions on Turkish soil, before pulling back to Syria. Soon afterwards, the Turkish Army regained control of the border crossing and silos area. Also, YPG fighters carried out a military operation targeting an IS vehicle in the village of Tal Ghazal in the southern countryside of Kobani, killing 2 militants, including a local emir, and advanced in the south of the town, reaching the Aleppo-Kobani road near Tarmek village. YPG fighters also regained control over a building in the Azadi Yard. In all, 50 IS militants, 12 FSA, 11 YPG, and three unknown pro-Kurdish fighters were killed on 29 November.

On 1 December, the YPG recaptured the Botan Gharbi neighborhood, located in the southern part of the town, and advanced in the northwestern part of the Mistanour Plain. The next day, IS detonated a car bomb on the outskirts of that neighborhood. The YPG expanded their control over the southern part of Kobanî on 4 December, resulting in the death of 10 IS militants and one YPG fighter.

Between 8 and 13 December, YPG seized a number of IS positions in the southern part of Kobanî, as well as some points on Tarmek street.

On 20 December, YPG fully besieged the cultural center after it took the street around it.

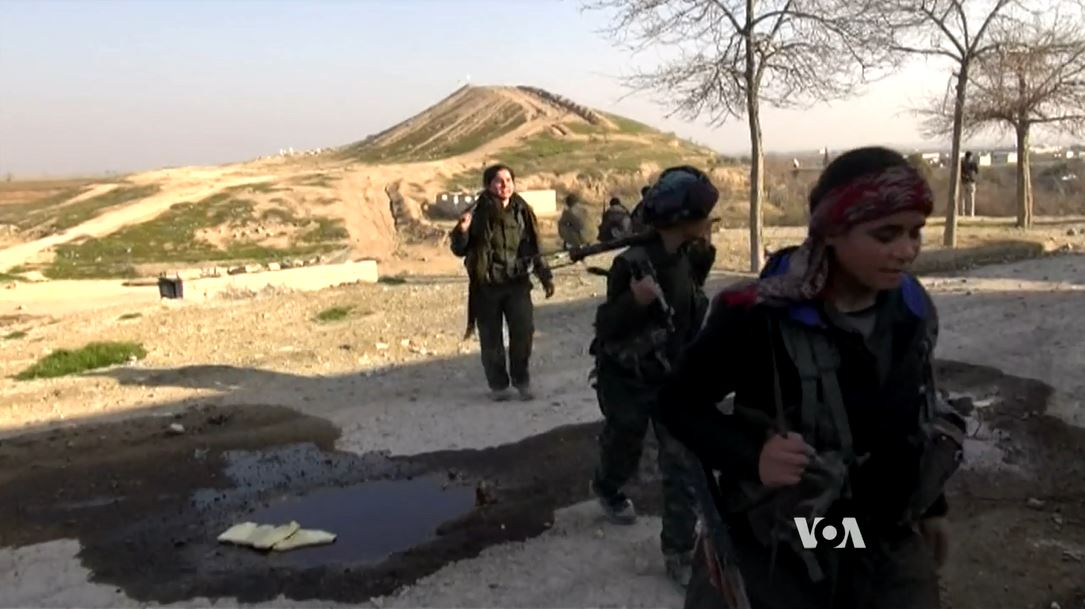
YPJ fighters in Kobanî's outskirts

On 26 December, in a sixty-sixth round of airstrikes on IS in Syria, the United States and coalition partners carried out four airstrikes in and around Kobanî, destroying three IS buildings and two IS vehicles.

On 1 January 2015, the YPG recaptured the Rash library and the Botan area south of Kobanî, thus recapturing the eastern section of the town, and ending up controlling 70% of Kobanî. On the next day, IS commander Sheikh Othman Al-Nazeh was reportedly killed by an airstrike in Kobanî.

On 5 January 2015, YPG units recaptured the governmental and security district and the al-Refia, al-Sena'a, al-Tharura, and al-Banat schools. YPG also advanced in the Mishtanour neighborhood south of the town. According to SOHR, at this point, the YPG controlled at least 80% of Kobanî city. At least 14 IS militants were killed in the clashes. The next day, IS fighters launched an attack within the vicinity of the Rash bookstore. The attack was countered by the YPG. Elsewhere, a BMP infantry fighting vehicle was destroyed among other vehicles, with several weapons captured. That day's failed offensive was considered the largest YPG counter-attack in Kobani since 28 December 2014. In all, 47 IS fighters were killed during the assaults on that day.

On 16 January 2015, an IS militant detonated a suicide belt near the government square, while the YPG destroyed an APC and seized a Humvee during the fighting. Between 15 and 16 January, 23 IS militants and 8 YPG fighters were killed in the clashes.

=== YPG recaptures Kobanî city ===
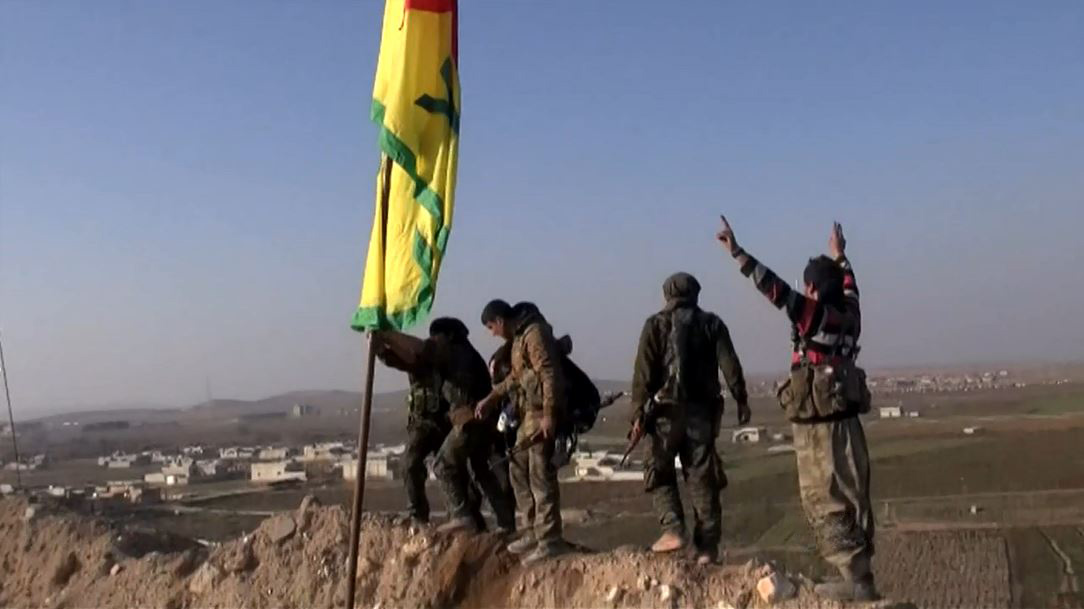
YPG fighters raise their flag over the town

On 19 January 2015, YPG fighters fully recaptured Mistanour Hill south of Kobanî, killing 11 IS militants. By recapturing the hill, the YPG controlled the IS supply routes to Aleppo and Raqqa. The next day, YPG also captured the national hospital and reached the southwestern entrance of the town. On 21 January, the first Peshmerga fighter was killed in the battle.

On 23 January, YPG fighters captured two streets to the east and the north of Rash Library, as well as Souq al-Hal and large parts of the northwestern part of the al-Senaa neighborhood, bringing 70% of the city under their control. The next day, YPG also recaptured the Sharia School and Sidan mosque, as well as the village of Termak in the southern countryside of Kobanî. At this moment, IS presence in Kobanî was reduced to two neighborhoods. The village of Mamid was recaptured by YPG and FSA fighters on 25 January 2015. IS lost 12 militants and a vehicle in the clashes. On the same day, YPG fighters cut the IS supply route to Kobanî. By that time, IS control of Kobanî was reduced to 10%. IS dispatched an additional 140 fighters, most of them under the age of 18.

On 26 January, the YPG forced remaining IS forces in Kobanî to retreat and managed to enter the eastern outlying areas, thus fully recapturing the city. After the recapture of the city, YPG fighters were carrying out "the final clean-up" and besieging areas they believed IS leaders might be hiding. IS resistance persisted in the eastern outskirts of Kobanî, and parts of the surrounding Kobanî region remained under IS control. Pentagon spokesman Colonel Steve Warren said, "I'm not prepared to say the battle is won. The battle continues, but friendly forces have the momentum." He also said that Kurdish forces controlled about 70% of the territory in and around Kobanî, which includes 90% of the city itself. The U.S. confirmed that the city had been cleared of IS forces on 27 January, and IS admitted defeat in Kobanî city three days later, although they vowed to return. At this time, IS redeployed much of its initial invasion force to other "more important fronts".

== Retaking the Kobanî Canton ==
After pushing IS out of Kobanî city on 27 January, the YPG and FSA started advancing on IS-held villages in the region.

On 27 January, YPG fighters recaptured the village of Helnej southeast of Kobanî, and they also besieged IS forces in the southern countryside of the city. On the next day, YPG and FSA fighters recaptured Kolama village, Seran mall, and Noroz hall.

By 6 February, YPG forces recaptured over 100 villages in the Kobanî Canton that they had lost to IS during the previous year. The Kurds reported they faced "no resistance" from IS forces, due to the fact that IS kept "withdrawing its fighters" whenever the YPG entered another village. According to the SOHR, most IS militants to the west of Kobanî were ethnic Turks. Also, during this phase, some IS militants surrendered themselves to the Turkish border guards.

On 8 February, while IS steadily retreated from the villages to the south and the east of Kobanî, it was reported that the YPG and FSA faced stiff resistance from IS forces in the villages to the west of Kobanî, as IS wanted to retain control over their territory in Aleppo Governorate. Experts voiced concerns that IS could return with a vengeance, given the group's fluidity and history of counterattacking after apparent withdrawals. On 9 February, IS tactically withdrew some of its fighters and military hardware from other villages in the Aleppo province to reinforce the Kobanî frontline.

On 15 February, the YPG seized the Baghdak Hill and Jareqli Hill in fighting that killed 35 IS and four YPG fighters. The next day, YPG forces backed by rebels captured Khondan, thus regaining control over 2,000 square kilometers of the northeastern Aleppo countryside. On 17 February, YPG and rebels seized the Aleppo-Hasakah road and seven villages in the Raqqa province during clashes in which 10 IS militants and one YPG fighter were killed.

On 26 February, it was reported that the YPG and FSA has retaken some of the last IS strongholds in the western Kobanî countryside, killing over 23 IS militants. An airstrike targeted the local IS command center in al-Shuyookh Gharbi, killing at least 8 militants, including prominent leaders.

By 1 March, YPG forces, backed by FSA fighters, had recaptured 296 villages. IS deployed reinforcements to the southern and eastern parts of the Kobanî Canton, as they wanted to prevent YPG and FSA forces from reaching the de facto IS capital of Raqqa. Kurdish forces were reportedly planning to build on their advances and capture Tell Abyad, thus connecting the Kobanî Canton to the Jazira Canton.

Between 1 and 6 March the YPG and FSA, supported by airstrikes, besieged IS militants at the French-owned Lafarge Cement Plant and seized 11 villages, including Shuyukh Tahtani and Shuyukh Fawqani, the last two villages in the western part of Kobanî Canton still held by IS, on the eastern bank of the Euphrates River. As a result, IS retreated to Jarabulus, before blowing up the western end of the Jarabulus Bridge in order to prevent Kurdish forces from reaching that city. 98 IS militants and 11 YPG fighters were killed during the clashes. It was also reported that IS militants from Tell Abyad were crossing over into Turkey and re-emerging in the villages to the west of Tell Abyad, to stage attacks on Kurdish-held villages near the edge of the eastern frontline.

On 9 March, as a result of the recent Kurdish gains, and the Kurdish advance towards the Sarrin grain silos, IS attempted to launch a counterattack from Sarrin, in the southern part of Kobanî Canton, capturing the villages of Jill, Khan-Mamdid, and Sal. IS also assaulted several villages north of Sarrin. However, a Coalition airstrike halted the IS advance. In addition, airstrikes blew up an oil refinery at Al-Mumbteh, just northwest of Tell Abyad. The explosion killed 30 IS militants and refinery workers in the area. 13 YPG fighters were killed during the clashes in the Mandek area, west of the village of al-Jalabiyyi. It was also reported that the YPG and allied forces had begun shelling the IS-held city of Jarabulus, across the west bank of the Euphrates River. The next day, the YPG recaptured Mandek, Khwaydan, Khan-Mamed, and Hamdoun. The fighting left 15 Kurdish fighters and 12 IS fighters dead.

On 13 March, fighting along the frontline killed 7 IS militants and 2 FSA fighters.

On 15 March, after a renewed YPG assault, supported by airstrikes, in Qara Qozak caused the IS defense there to collapse and forced them to retreat, IS militants blew up the Qara Qozak Bridge, to prevent YPG forces from crossing over to the west bank of the Euphrates. The remaining IS militants gathered in a house near the bridge, which was promptly destroyed by a Coalition airstrike. On the next day, it was confirmed that all of the remaining IS fighters in Qara Qozak had either been killed or surrendered, leaving YPG and FSA forces in full control of the town. 45 IS militants and at least 4 YPG fighters had been killed at Qara Qozak, between 13 and 15 March. Three days later, the Coalition destroyed the remainder of the Qara Qozak Bridge, to prevent IS reinforcements from reaching Sarrin. With this, Kurdish forces had recaptured almost all of the villages previously lost to IS in their initial September 2014 assault on the Kobanî Canton. IS continued to maintain control of a few dozen villages they captured in the northwestern part of the Raqqa Governorate, as well as a few villages in the southern part of the Canton.

== Aftermath ==
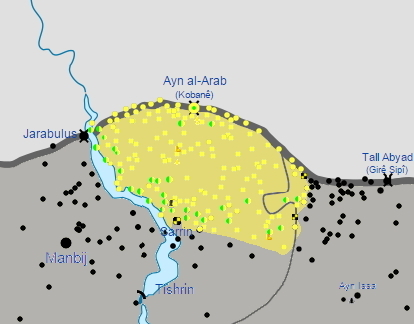
The situation after the end of IS's siege of the Kobanî Canton, on 29 April 2015. Most of IS's advances since September 2014 had been reversed, and YPG-led forces were battling for control of Sarrin. Controlled by Kurdish forces Controlled by the Syrian opposition Controlled by Islamic State

CJTF-OIR airstrike on an IS mortar position near Kobani, 19 April 2015

Over the next few days, the YPG seized control of a hill overlooking Sarrin, the last remaining IS stronghold in the southern part of the Kobanî Canton.

On 20 March, the YPG and the allied Burkan al-Furat, backed by Coalition air support, launched an assault on Sarrin, which led to hit-and-run fighting until 28 March.

On 21 March, the YPG captured Tel Kharab Zir and advanced into Akbesh and Tell Kazan. Meanwhile, YPG and FSA forces completely besieged the Sarrin grain silos. A total of 71 IS militants and 1 FSA fighters were killed during the clashes and Coalition strikes. On the night between 22 and 23 March, IS dispatched reinforcements from to Sarrin, across the Tishrin Dam, which the Coalition did not target, due to the risks that destroying the dam would pose to those living downstream.

On 25 March, the YPG reportedly captured the village of Al-Jalabiyya in the Raqqa province. Meanwhile, IS forces attacked the village of Qara Qozak by boat, but the attack was repelled by the YPG and airstrikes struck the gathered IS forces on the other side of the river. The clashes led to the deaths of at least 71 IS militants and 4 YPG fighters. Two days later, fighting in the southern villages of Sebti and Khani left three IS militants dead.

During the next 3 weeks, the YPG and FSA advance along the southern and eastern borders nearly stalemated, as IS continued pouring reinforcements into the region. The clashes that erupted during this period of time killed at least 195 IS militants, along with at least 14 YPG fighters and 2 FSA fighters.

Between 12 and 14 April, YPG-FSA joint forces captured seven villages and the French-owned Lafarge Cement Plant in Raqqa Province, and repelled an IS counterattack on 12 April. At least 30 IS militants, and at least 3 YPG and 2 FSA fighters were killed during this period.

On 9 April, an IS counterattack pushed YPG forces back from Sarrin and retook the grain silos, breaking past YPG defense lines at the M4 Highway. However, a YPG counter-offensive during mid-April, with the aid of US-led Coalition airstrikes, allowed them to slowly advance towards the city again.

By 17 April, the YPG had recaptured 332 of the 350 villages they had lost in the initial IS offensive, in September 2014.

By 20 April, the YPG had fully recaptured Jill, Hamdoun, Kayful, Sal, and the neighboring villages. The YPG had also captured Ras al Ayn on 19 April, which severed IS's supply line to Sarrin from the east, allowing the YPG and allied forces to surround Sarrin. The clashes over the past few days, from 16 to 19 April, were reported to have killed at least 27 IS militants and 3 YPG fighters.

On 20 April, YPG forces captured Ras al Ayn, allowing the Kurds to sever IS's supply line to Sarrin from the east, and effectively besieging the city from both the east and the west. Also, YPG forces began attacking the last IS supply route to Sarrin, which lay south of the city. On 21 April, it was reported that YPG forces to the east of Sarrin came within 1 kilometre (0.62 mi) the gates of Sarrin, and YPG forces were continuing to advance, despite reports IS had heavily mined the approach to the city.

On 21 April 2015, the YPG and allied forces had recaptured territory up the M4 Highway, including the Sarrin grain silos, Septe, and the other neighboring villages, allowing YPG forces to advance further southward towards Sarrin. The clashes around the Sarrin grain silos were reported to have killed at least 20 IS militants over the past two days. This advance allowed the YPG to recapture nearly all of the territory that they had lost during IS's September 2014 offensive, except for a few dozen villages that IS had captured in the northwest Raqqa Province. By 21 April 2015, a total of 4,460–5,000 IS militants had been reportedly killed in the Kobanî Canton since 15 September 2014, according to Kurdish sources. On 22 April, it was reported the Sarrin grain silos were still held by around 50 IS militants, but a "near total" siege had been imposed on them.

Early on 25 April, after three days of repeated IS attacks on Mistras failed, Kurdish forces and their allies launched an all-out offensive on Sarrin from several fronts, backed by reinforcements, to dislodge IS. It was reported IS forces stationed near Sarrin had retreated the city and heavy fighting had erupted in the northern, western, and eastern suburbs. YPG and FSA forces also pushed into the northern part of the city. On 26 April, YPG-led forces entered the eastern outskirts of the city. By 26 April, it was reported the YPG-led push into Sarrin had slowed, as IS continued sending more reinforcements.

Early on 29 April 2015, the last 124 Peshmerga fighters stationed in Kobanî returned to Kurdistan Region, as the city had been secured. Kurdistan Region also stated that no more troops would be sent to Kobanî.

=== June 2015 Kobanî massacre ===
On 25 June 2015, fighters from the Islamic State detonated three car bombs in Kobanî, close to the Turkish border crossing. The IS fighters were reported to have disguised themselves as Kurdish security forces, before entering the town and shooting civilians with assault rifles and RPGs. Kurdish forces and the Syrian government claimed the vehicles had entered the city from across the border, an action denied by Turkey. IS also committed a massacre in the village of Barkh Butan, about 20 kilometres south of Kobanî, executing at least 26 Syrian Kurds, among them women and children. In total, around 164 people were killed and 200 were injured by 27 June, making the attack one of the largest killing of civilians carried out by IS in northern Syria.

== Tomb of Suleyman Shah operation ==
The Turkish Army mounted a rescue operation across the border to evacuate its soldiers from the Tomb of Suleyman Shah, an exclave of Turkey south of Kobanî. The Turkish convoy reportedly transited through Kurdish-held Kobanî en route to the tomb. One Turkish soldier was killed in what Ankara described as an accident. The success of the operation was announced 22 February by Turkish Prime Minister Ahmet Davutoğlu.

== Humanitarian needs and reconstruction ==
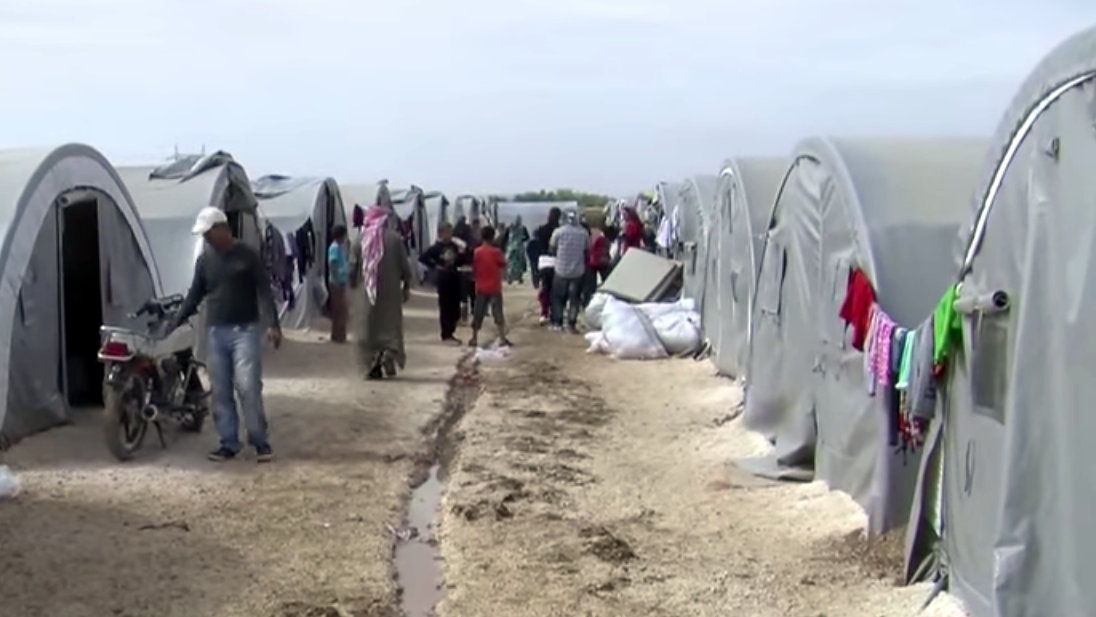
Kurdish refugees from Kobanî in a refugee camp, on the Turkish side of the Syria–Turkey border

The humanitarian response to the people from Kobani who were displaced to Suruc, Turkey, was highly polarizing, with actors associated with Turkish state opposed to such aid on one hand, and the pro-Kurdish movement desiring aid on the other. In early 2015, Kurdish sources detailed the humanitarian needs and need for reconstruction as a result of the siege. The situation was complicated by the effective trade embargo by Turkey and all routes through Syrian territory being under IS control.

The siege destroyed large parts of the town and surrounding villages and damaged infrastructure. Al-Qaeda (IS) and its allies cut the water and electricity supplies to the city in January 2014, so the residents established a replacement water service and a power generating station. IS destroyed the replacement water line and the fuel tanks that ran the generators that provided electricity. Wells provide some non-potable water but residents used bottled drinking water which was in short supply. Food, grain and flour, were in short supply and the government bakery was captured by IS. The fighting destroyed all three hospitals, leaving a single volunteer doctor operating from a damaged house. A lack of medical supplies and electricity for medical equipment complicated medical care.

Conditions in Turkish refugee camps were poor, so residents started back to Kobanî as soon as IS was expelled from the city, placing additional pressure on the food, water, and damaged utilities.

== Spillover on the Turkish side of the border and protests ==
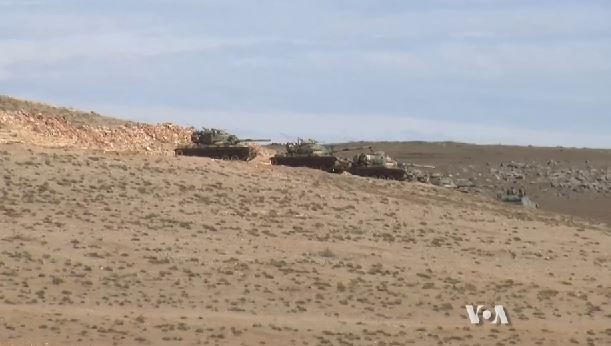
Tanks of the Turkish Land Forces on the border to Syria, near Kobanî, November 2014

More than 300,000 Syrian refugees flowed into Turkey to escape the IS advance into the Kobanî Canton. However, security forces did not allow People's Protection Units (YPG) militants and other volunteers to go the other way, using teargas and water cannons. On 30 September, errant shells landed on Turkish soil and the Turks shot back into Syrian territory, with Turkish armor being brought to the border to deter further incursions. Five civilians in Turkey were injured when a mortar hit their house. Turkey evacuated two villages as a precautionary measure. While dispersing Kurdish crowds, Turkish police fired teargas directly into a BBC news crew van, breaking through the rear window and starting a small fire.

Protests erupted in various cities in Turkey regarding the lack of support for the Kurds from the Turkish government. Protesters were met with teargas and water cannons, and initially 12 people were killed. Thirty-one people were killed in subsequent rioting. Turkish President Erdoğan said that he was not ready to launch operations against IS in Syria unless it was also against the Bashar al-Assad government.

On 1 November, there was an international day of protest for the Kurds of Kobanî. Five thousand people demonstrated in the Turkish town of Suruc, 10 kilometres (six miles) from the border. At least 15,000 marched in Turkey's largest Kurdish-majority city of Diyarbakir and 1,000 protested in Istanbul peacefully. On 7 November, there were reports that a 28-year-old Kurdish woman activist had been "shot in the head" by Turkish soldiers on the Turkish side of the border near Kobanî. She was reportedly part of a "peaceful group of demonstrators", who wanted the Turkish government to allow volunteers from Turkey to join the fight against IS in Kobanî.

On 28 November, Kurds alleged that an IS suicide bomber crossed over in a vehicle from Turkey into Kobanî; however, Turkey denied this. A Kobanî activist, Mustafa Bali, said that IS fighters took positions in the grain silos on the Turkish side of the border, and launched attacks toward the border crossing point from there. However, on 29 November, YPG fighters crossed the Turkish border and attacked IS positions on Turkish soil, before pulling back to Syria, and the Turkish Army regained control of the border crossing and silos area shortly afterwards.

On 27 January 2015, Turkey fired tear gas against Kurds trying to cross the border to celebrate the liberation of Kobanî.

== Analysis ==
Media pointed to Kobanî as more symbolic than strategic, for all sides. Kurdish People's Defense Units (YPG) militia issued this statement: "The battle for Kobani was not only a fight between the YPG and Daesh [ISIS], it was a battle between humanity and barbarity, a battle between freedom and tyranny, it was a battle between all human values and the enemies of humanity". The fighting strengthened ties between the YPG and the FSA (Free Syrian Army) by establishing a viable source of ground forces for the American-led coalition, and dispelled the notion that the Kurds were Assad supporters. The successful experience in Kobanî has informed U.S. policy in regards to arming Syrian opposition groups other than the YPG, with plans to equip other groups with technicals with radio equipment and global positioning system trackers to call in airstrikes.

The battle became a magnet for IS fighters, including the group's best foreign fighters. IS had issued a video of hostage John Cantlie in Kobanî talking about their control of the city, but the loss of Kobanî is a reversal of fortunes, and perhaps a strategic withdrawal. There were reports of strife and infighting in the ranks of IS in the wake of their defeat at Kobanî, with foreign fighters of different nationalities turning on each other under the strain of the confrontation, with accusations of treachery.

US spokesmen credited the U.S. airdrop of arms to the Kurdish defenders and an agreement by Turkey to let Iraqi Kurdish reinforcements cross the border. "Had we not done those two things, Kobani would have been gone, and you would have seen another massacre. Rear Admiral John Kirby, the Pentagon press secretary, said: "I think the air strikes helped a lot. It helped when we had ... a reliable partner on the ground in there who could help us fine-tune those strikes." The bombings were carried out by Rockwell B-1B Lancer strategic bombers carrying 500 lb and 2,000 lb bombs, and Lt. Col. Sumangil of the 9th Bomb Squadron stated that airstrikes combined with allied ground forces "basically stopped their [ISIL's] progress"; YPG fighters communicated with liaisons and air controllers at the U.S. Combined Air Operation Center at Al Udeid Air Base in Qatar, who then took that information and sent bomb coordinates to the B-1s flying over Kobanî. USAF F-15Es and F-16s were also integral to the campaign.

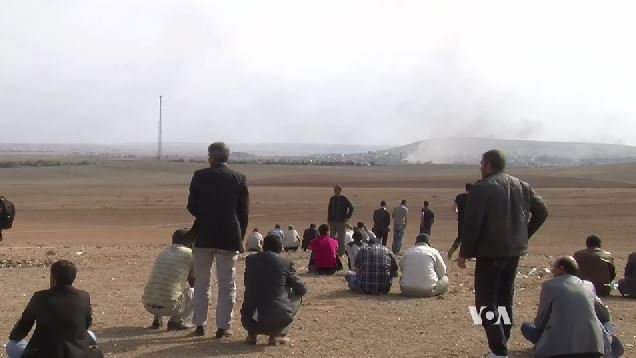
Kurdish civilians watch the fighting in Kobanî from the Turkish border, 30 October 2014

Kobanî's unique geographical position directly on the Turkish border prevented IS from fully surrounding the city. Although Turkey heavily restricted the flow of fighters, weapons, and supplies, some of them still made it into Kobanî. Over 1,000 defenders of Kobanî were treated in Turkish hospitals, and the border functioned as an escape route of last resort for defenders.

Turkey and its foreign policy is seen by some as a loser in the battle over Kobanî. Turkey's own struggle against Kurdish independence has clouded its stance toward the Rojava Kurds. After the US airdropped supplies that Turkey would not allow into Kobanî, Turkish President Recep Tayyip Erdogan stated that he had asked then-US President Barack Obama not to intervene on the side of the Kurds. "I told Mr. Obama, 'Don't drop those bombs [meaning weapons and other supplies]. You will be making a mistake.' Unfortunately, despite our conversation, they dropped whatever was needed with three C-130's and half of it landed in [IS'] hands. So who is supplying [ISIL], then?" Erdogan is also opposed to any arrangements in Syria that would mirror the Iraqi Kurds' de facto state in northern Syria. He repeated this view on 26 January 2015 to reporters, asking, "What is this? Northern Iraq? Now [they want] Northern Syria to be born. It is impossible for us to accept this. … Such entities will cause great problems in the future."

Local highly motivated ground forces combined with airpower are needed to reverse IS gains, and the Kurds are nearly unique in their willingness to fight on the ground, something the Iraqi central government, Syrian government, and American allies like Turkey, Jordan, and others in the region have been unwilling or unable to do. The Syrian Kurds are strongly motivated to protect their region and gain greater autonomy, while the Iraqi Kurds are motivated to enlarge the size of their de facto autonomous region.

== International reactions ==
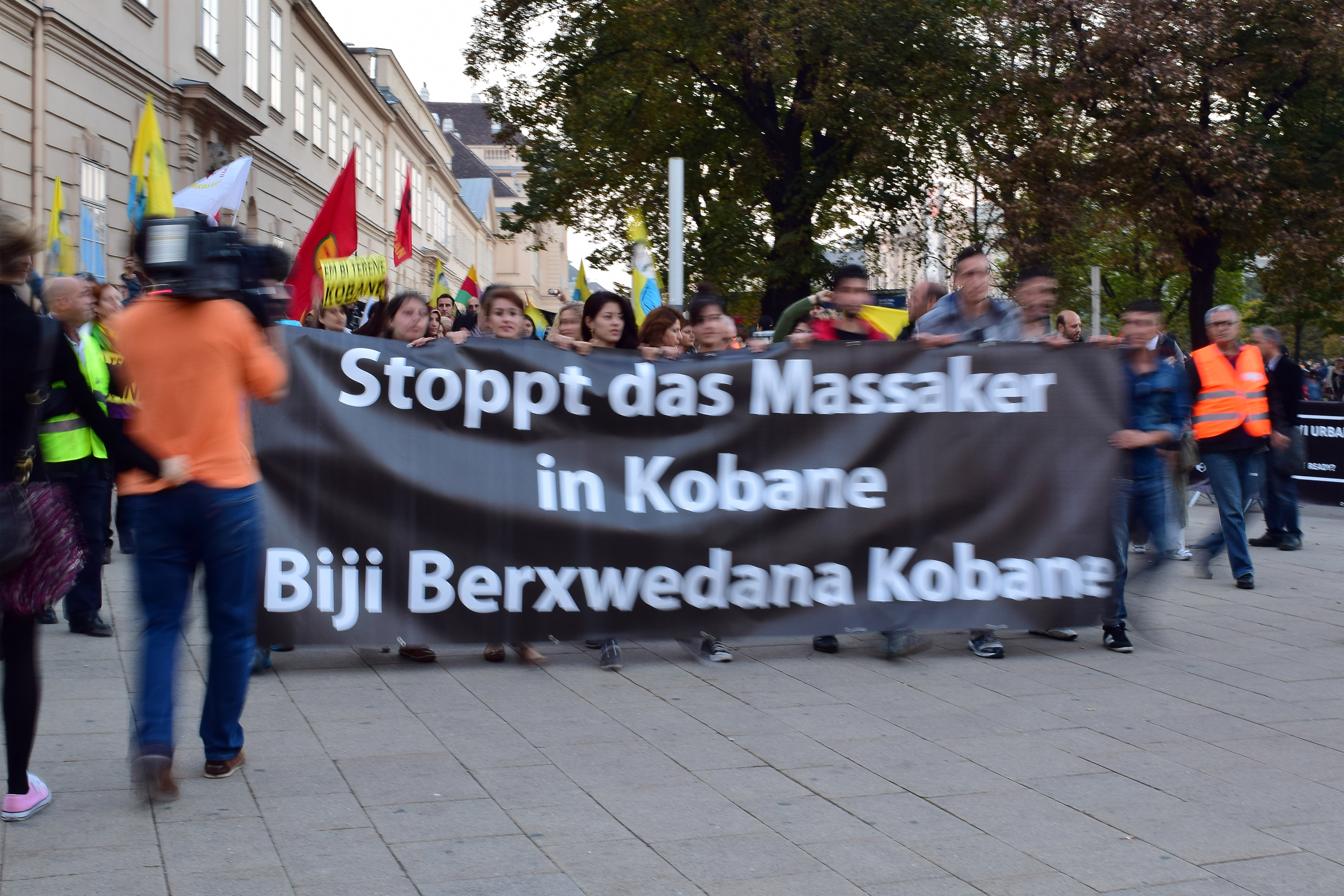
Demonstration in Vienna, Austria, 10 October 2014

Secular Conference statement in support of the Kobane defenders, London 11–12 October 2014.

Kurdistan Workers' Party (PKK) – In September, the PKK threatened to resume its fight against the Turkish government, partly because of what it said was the latter's support for the onslaught against Kobanî. Öcalan reiterated the threat on 1 October 2014.

Kurdistan Democratic Party (KDP) – The leader of the Kurdistan Democratic Party and President of Kurdistan Region, Masoud Barzani, called on the international community to defend the town, immediately after the first attack. "Barzani urges countries that are fighting IS to help the people and fighters of Kobane in their fight against the terrorist ISIS," said Fuad Hussein, chief of staff of Barzani. Meanwhile, soon the Turkish daily newspaper Hurriyet reported that Barzani has asked Turkey to allow Peshmarga to pass through its territory to enter Kobane and prevent the town from falling. On 19 October, the US air planes delivered military and medical assistance from the Kurdistan Region via airdrops. A few days later, 150 Peshmarga troops were mobilized to be sent to Kobane which they entered the town on 30 October carrying heavy weaponry with themselves.

Kurdistan Region – On 6 October 2014, Kurdistan Region officials blamed the geography of the Kobanî region, as well as the Syrian Democratic Union Party's (PYD) "strategic mistakes"—which included concentrating power in an authoritarian manner—for not being able to send aid or support. The Iraqi Kurdish Regional Government announced on 12 October 2014, that it would send weapons, equipment, and humanitarian aid to Kobanî, with Prime Minister Nechirvan Barzani stating "Kobanî is very important to us and we will spare no effort to save it".

Patriotic Union of Kurdistan (PUK) – In September 2014, the PUK asked Iran, Iraq, and Turkey to help the Kurdish defenders of Kobanî.

(Syrian opposition) Free Syrian Army (FSA) – Colonel Malik el-Kurdi, one of the commanders of the FSA, criticized the U.S. administration over airdropping weapons to the armed Kurdish factions: "It is disgusting politics for the U.S. to deliver weapons to the Kurds who have been fighting ISIS for only a month in a small town, while depriving the mainstream opposition for more than three years from any military and strategic aid while resisting the Assad regime that commits any kind of war crime."

Ba'athist Syria – A senior Syrian minister apologized for not sending airstrikes, saying that Kobanî was so close to the Turkish border, that their jets would violate Turkish territory and be shot down. The Syrian Foreign Ministry also said that any Turkish military activity on its soil would be considered an act of aggression, and reacted furiously to Peshmerga troops being deployed to Kobanî, claiming this was evidence of Turkey's "conspiratorial role" in Syria.

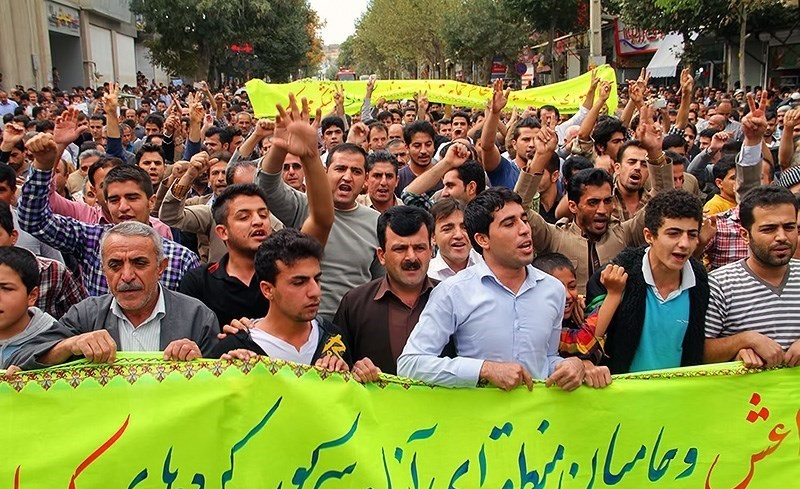
Iranian Kurds demonstration in support of Kobanî people, Marivan, 6 October 2014

Iran – Foreign Ministry spokeswoman Marzieh Afkham stressed the importance of supporting the Syrian government and nation in their fight against the terrorists in the region and called for supplying humanitarian aid to civilians and refugees. She denounced the international community's indifference toward the fate of the people in Kobani and said, "The Islamic Republic of Iran will soon send humanitarian aid to residents and refugees in this area through the Syrian government." Foreign Ministry also criticized the "passivity of the international community" regarding the besieged Syrian border town of Kobani and said the world should help President Bashar al-Assad confront "the terrorists." The comments by foreign ministry spokeswoman Afkham came shortly after Turkey's president Recep Tayyip Erdoğan said Kobani was on the verge of falling to jihadists fighting for ISIS.

Iranian President Hassan Rouhani also said that his country was ready to hold talks with the United States and Saudi Arabia on ways to resolve Syria's civil war, providing such negotiations can secure peace and democracy in conflict-torn Syria. "Iran will sit at any table with regional countries and world powers if the outcome will be a safer, stable and democratic future for Syria," Rouhani said in a press conference with Austrian President Heinz Fischer, adding this is part of Iran's commitment to "international, Islamic and humane" norms.

Protests broke out in several Kurdish cities in Western Iran, as well as other cities across country including Tabriz, Mashhad and Tehran itself in front of the Turkish Embassy to express their support for Kobani. Human rights and dissident activists were also in attendance at some of the protests. Iranian Kurdish musicians Shahram Nazeri and Sedigh Tarif have also gone on hunger strike to bring attention to the plight of Kurds in Kobani. One op-ed by conservative Iranian news website Khabar Online has asked Major General Qasem Soleimani to help defend Kobani. As commander of the Quds Force, Soleimani has been heavily involved in advising the Iraqi forces and militias since IS took over large parts of western Iraq this summer. Pictures of him alongside Iraqi and Iraqi Kurdish forces in various Iraqi cities have become common as Iran has not hidden its presence there. The op-ed cited reports that Soleimani and Iran were involved in liberating the Iraqi town of Amerli and had supplied arms to Kurdish forces in Iraq to fight IS. It read that "the weight of resistance in the region" was on his shoulders. Nobel Peace Prize winner Shirin Ebadi also praised Kobani's women with saying "Kobani's women are true symbol of brave women..."

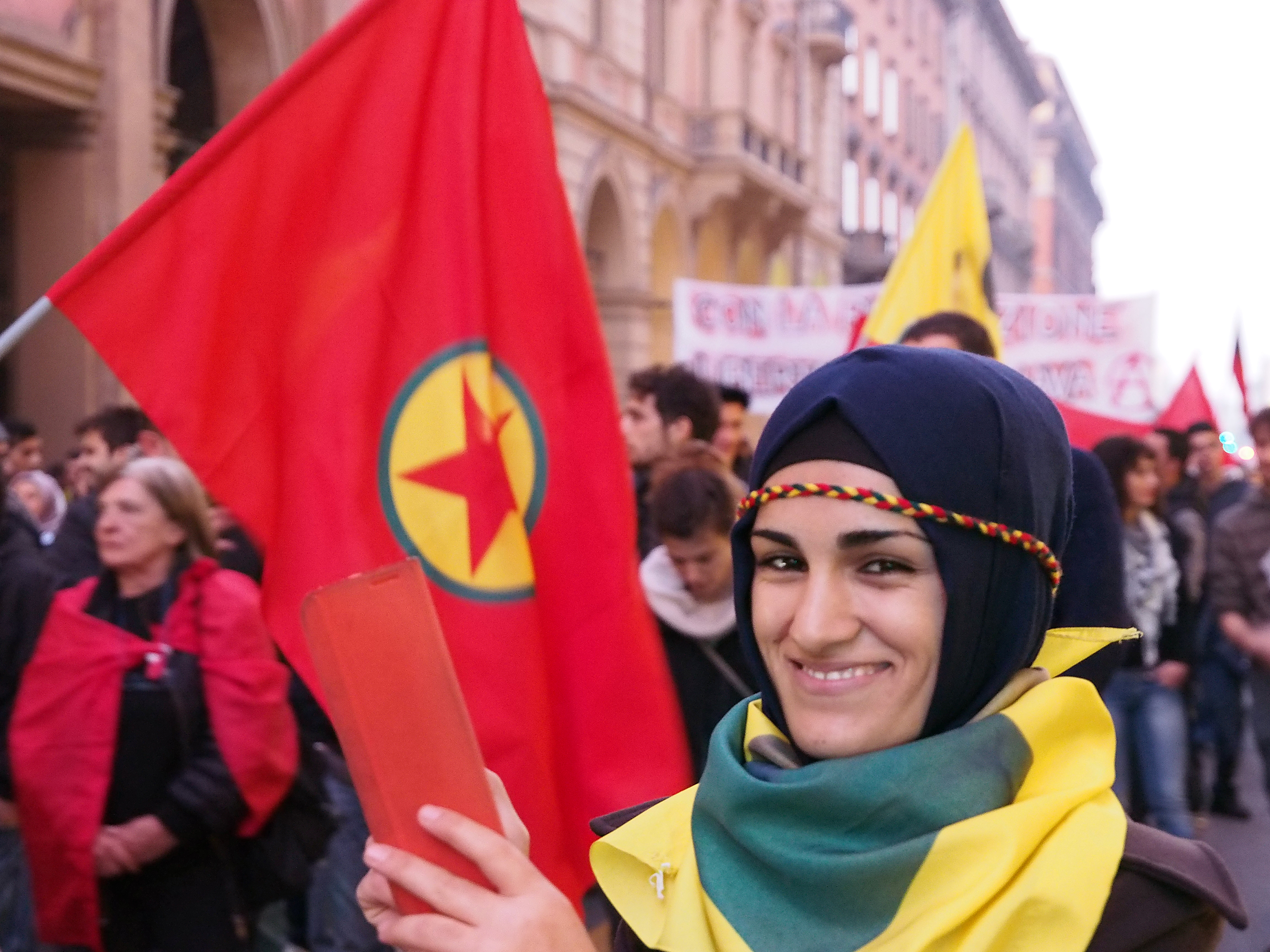
Global day for Kobanî. Kurdish protests took the streets all over the world on 1 November 2014. Kurdish protesters in Bologna, Italy.

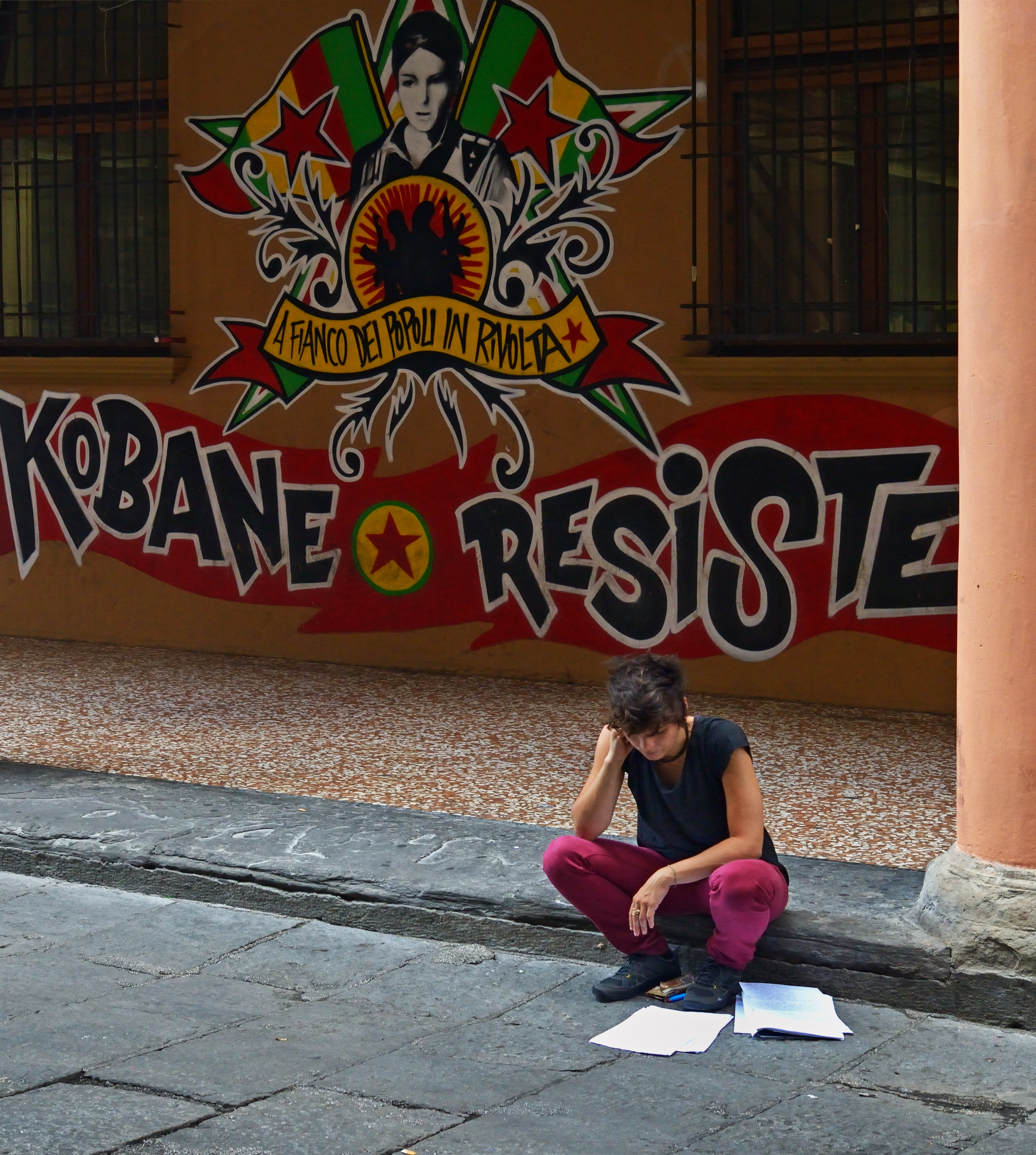
Pro-Kurdish graffiti at the University of Bologna

Turkey – President Recep Tayyip Erdoğan urged the international community to act to defend the town and prevent it from falling to ISIS. He stressed that "there must be cooperation on the ground", as airstrikes alone would not change the situation. Prime Minister Ahmet Davutoğlu said that it is "not acceptable to claim that the crisis has happened just because Turkey has not opened its borders." He also defended Turkey's refusal to let Kurds cross into Syria to fight into Kobanî, saying that Turkey does "not let Turkish citizens go into Syria because we don't want them to be a part of the conflict in Syria." Turkish Deputy Prime Minister Bülent Arınç mocked the defenders of the town, saying that "They are not able to put up a serious fight there. ... It is easy to kidnap people but they are not able to fight in Ain al-Arab. I could say a lot more but let me leave it at that so that they are not embarrassed." Yasin Aktay, deputy chairman of the ruling AKP party, stated in an interview that "What is going on in Kobanî now is a war between two terrorist organizations." President Erdoğan, on 22 October 2014, concerning the U.S. airdrops in Kobanî, told a news conference in Ankara that "What was done here on this subject turned out to be wrong. Why did it turn out wrong? Because some of the weapons they dropped from those C130s were seized by ISIS."

USA – The United States conducted airstrikes, but the proximity of the Turkish border and Kurdish fighters made for a difficult situation. A Pentagon official believes that the media outcry about the situation in Kobanî is relayed by nearby reporters. The official said that many other towns have fallen to IS without TV crews present. US officials indicated to CNN that they were not concerned if Kobanî fell and that the US goals in Syria are "not to save cities and towns, but to go after ISIS' senior leadership, oil refineries and other infrastructure that would curb the terror group's ability to operate—particularly in Iraq. However, in late October 2014, The Wall Street Journal reported that U.S. officials had decided Kobanî was "too symbolically important to lose" and stepped up efforts to prevent IS from capturing the border town, including covertly coordinating with local Kurdish forces, despite opposition from Turkey.

== In popular culture ==
- The Kurdish film Kobanê depicts the siege of Kobanî.
- Kobane Calling, by the Italian author Zerocalcare, is a graphic novel / reportage that focuses on the aftermath of the siege. It has been adapted into a theater play.

== See also ==
- 2014 Eastern Syria offensive
- Siege of Deir ez-Zor (2014–2017)
- Sinjar massacre
- December 2014 Sinjar offensive
- November 2015 Sinjar offensive
- Eastern al-Hasakah offensive
- Western al-Hasakah offensive
- Tell Abyad offensive
- Battle of Sirte (2016)
- Battle of al-Bab
- Battle of Mosul (2016–17)
- Raqqa campaign (2016–2017)
- Operation Inherent Resolve – U.S. designation for operations against IS
- Operation Euphrates Shield
- 2024 Kobani clashes
