= Medynsky =

Medynsky, Medinsky, Medynský, Medinski or Medynskiy may be a trasliteration of Russian "Медынский" or "Мединский". It may refer to:

- Medynsky District in Kaluga Oblast, Russia
- Medynsky Uyezd in Kaluga Governorate, Russian Empire
- Pavel Medynský (born 1964), Czech football manager
- Sergey Medynsky (1922-2014), Soviet Russian documentary filmmaker
- Vladimir Medinsky (born 1970), Russian politician
- Ahmad Medinsky, Dagestani Salafi preacher
