= Reda Seyam =

Reda Seyam (born 1959 or 1960), also known as Ghana Prakesh or Gnanavel (the one with two horns), was a German-Turkish Islamic militant and an official in the Islamic State (IS). He has been described as a 'veteran of jihad' and is the highest ranking German member of the Islamic State.

== Background ==
Reda Seyam was born in 1959 or 1960 in Egypt. He joined the Bosnian mujahideen in 1994, fighting in the Bosnian War (1992–95). He later moved to Riyadh, Saudi Arabia in 1998.

Seyam is suspected of playing a role in financing the 2002 Bali bombings. He was arrested in Indonesia and interrogated by the Central Intelligence Agency at a black site before being extradited to Germany in 2003, where he became an influential figure in the Salafi movement.

== Islamic State ==
On August 19, 2013, it was reported that Seyam was active in Syria. Presently he is said to be the "emir for education" in Nineveh Governorate, Iraq, where he is responsible for "education reform" in the region. He has appeared in a video titled "Education in the Shade of the Caliphate" and in pictures taken inside Mosul University.

According to a study by Jean-Charles Brisard and Kevin Jacksom, he was at one point deputy to the Islamic State governor in Aleppo province in Syria.

== Family ==
Seyam first married in 1988. His first wife left him and was placed in witness protection by the German government. He later remarried. Seyam has a son named Jihad. The Berlin Interior Minister, Ehrhart Körting made a complaint against him naming his son Jihad but on September 2, 2009 the Court of Appeal ruled that this was a common name in the Arab world and was, therefore, permissible.
