= Maher al-Agal =

Syrian IS commander

Maher al-Agal (Arabic: مَاهِرُ ٱلْعَقَّالْ, romanized: Māhir al-'Aqāl; died 12 July 2022) was a top commander and leader for the Islamic State in Syria. He was involved in aggressively developing IS networks outside Iraq and Syria, according to CENTCOM. Al-Agal was also a commander for Jaysh al-Sharqiyyah.

== History ==
Little is known about his life other than his military history.

He was a part of the Islamic State in Raqqa when the organisation still held that territory. When he presumably rose the ranks, he was aggressively spreading IS networks outside of Iraq and Syria worldwide.

Around 2020, al-Agal would be a member of Turkish-backed factions and would live in Afrin in northwestern Syria, where he would soon become a commander of a Syrian rebel group called Jaysh Al-Sharqiyyah.

== Death ==
At 12 July 2022, in Ghaltan village outside the town of Jindires, in northwest Syria, near the border of Hatay Province in Turkey, al-Agal was targeted by a US drone strike while riding his motorcycle, along with an unidentified IS official who was his close affiliate. The attack killed al-Agal and seriously injured the other IS official. This attack took extensive planning for it to come out as a successful operation, without any civilian casualties. The Pentagon used al-Agal's death as an example that they don't need thousands of troops to get rid of threats in their country.

== See also ==
- Islamic State
- List of Islamic State members
