= List of al-Qaeda members =

This is a list of current and former members of al-Qaeda, including its branches around the globe. Little is known about the leadership or members because of the secretive nature of the organization.

== Al-Qaeda Central (AQC) ==
Name	Rank	Status	Ref.
Abdullah Yusuf Azzam	Co-founder	Killed in 1989.	
Mohammed Atef	Military planner	Killed in 2001.	
Osama bin Laden	First Emir	Killed in 2011.	
Ayman al-Zawahiri	Second Emir	Killed in 2022.	
Saif al-Adel	Supreme Commander and strategist of al-Qaeda army	Current head of military shura.	
Abdullah Ahmed Abdullah	Operational planner	Killed in 2020.	
Adam Yahiye Gadahn	Interpreter, spokesman for al-Qaeda	Killed in 2015.	

== Other individuals ==
Name	Rank	Status	Ref.
Muhannad Almallah Dabas	Unknown	Died from a gun wound in Homs, Syria in 2013.	
Nasir al-Wuhayshi	Leader of al-Qaeda in the Arabian Peninsula	Killed in 2015.	
Abdelmalek Droukdel	Leader of al-Qaeda in the Islamic Maghreb	Killed in 2020.	
Asim Umar	Leader of al-Qaeda in the Indian Subcontinent	Killed in 2019.	
Fazul Abdullah Mohammed	Leader of al-Qaeda in East Africa	Killed in 2011.	
Hamza bin Laden	Fighter	Killed during the first two years of the Trump administration.	

== See also ==
- 055 Brigade
- Egyptian Islamic Jihad
- Islamic State
- List of Islamic State members
