= Narin Afrin =

Kurdish military leader

- Meysa Abdo
- Born: c. 1974; Afrin, Syria
- Education: Abdullah Öcalan’s teachings
- Military career
- Allegiance: DUP
- Branch: YPG
- Service years: c. 1994–present
- Rank: Commander
- Unit: YPJ
- Commands: Siege of Kobanî resistance forces
- Known for: Leading Kurdish resistance during the Siege of Kobanî
- Conflicts: Syrian Civil War; Siege of Kobanî; Rojava conflict; Operation Olive Branch

Narin Afrin (b. c. 1974) is the nom de guerre of Meysa Abdo, a leader of the Kurdish People's Protection Units (YPG), Women's Protection Units (YPJ), and Kobane resistance, notably during the 2014–2015 Siege of Kobanî.

== Background ==
Narin Afrin was a resistance leader during the 2014–2015 Siege of Kobanî, representing the Kurdish People's Protection Units (YPG) and Peshmerga fighters. The resistance group, the People's Protection Units (YPG), is secular, politically left-wing, and the armed wing of the Kurdish Democratic Union Party (PYD). She also leads the Women's Protection Units (YPJ), an all-female force affiliated with the YPG.

Afrin is the nom de guerre of Meysa Abdo, born c. 1974, though a Kurdish political consultant has told the International Business Times that Abdo is a pseudonym as well. Female fighters choose their names during military training as a way to separate their future from their past. "Afrin" refers to her Kurdish village of Afrin, Syria, and "Narin" was a name she liked.

Afrin avoids media spotlight—most published photos of Afrin were not actually her—and has expressed worry about the media portrayal of the Women's Protection Units, which focuses on the "cause célèbre" of empowered, "bronzed women toting guns" in a conservative region associated with a ruthless Islamic State. In 2014, the Financial Times reported that Afrin had become a "local legend" among Kurds.

She had studied with Abdullah Öcalan, the founder of the Kurdistan Workers' Party (PKK). She had participated in the PKK for 20 years prior to the Siege of Kobanî, having previously fought in Cezire (Qamishli region) before moving to Kobanî in early 2013.
