= Muhammad Sholeh Ibrahim =

Indonesian islamist terrorist (born 1958)

- Born: September 1958 (age 67–68); Demak, Indonesia
- Years active: 2008-present
- Known for: acting leader of Jamaah Ansharut Tauhid

Muhammad Sholeh Ibrahim (born Sep 1958) is an Indonesian man who is the acting leader of Jamaah Ansharut Tauhid since 2014. He has sworn allegiance to Abu Bakr al-Baghdadi, the leader of the Islamic State.

== History ==
He was born in Demak, Indonesia in September 1958.

== Jamaah Ansharut Tauhid ==
According to the United States Department of Treasury, he took part in JAT paramilitary training in 2008 and was involved in registering new JAT paramilitary recruits in 2010. In mid-2011, he organised buses to transport JAT supporters from Central Java to Jakarta for the trial of JAT founder Abu Bakar Bashir. Muhammad Sholeh Ibrahim "has supported ISIL and swore allegiance to the group in 2014". He has been involved in raising funds for JAT and served as a leader of their Surakarta office since 2014. He was previously responsible for planning and strategy.

=== US and UN sanctions ===
Muhammad Sholeh Ibrahim is subject to sanctions by both the United States Department of Treasury and the United Nations Security Council. He was listed by the UN on 20 April 2016 pursuant to paragraphs 3 and 5 of resolution 2253 (2015) as being associated with ISIL or Al-Qaida for "participating in the financing, planning, facilitating, preparing, or perpetrating of acts or activities by, in conjunction with, under the name of, on behalf of, or in support of" and "recruiting for" Islamic State in Iraq and the Levant.
