= Mubarak Mohammed al-Otaibi =

Saudi ISIS deputy leader

Mubarak Mohammed al-Otaibi (born 8 January 1986, Riyadh), known as Mubarak Mohammed A Alotaibi, Waqqas al-Jazrawi and Abu Gayth, is a Saudi Arabian man who serves as the Syria-based deputy leader for Islamic State operations inside Saudi Arabia.

== History ==
He was designated a 'Specially Designated Global Terrorist' on 27 April 2017 by the US State Department.
