= Sami Jasim Muhammad al-Jaburi =

Iraqi ISIS official

Sami Jasim Muhammed al-Jaburi
- Native name: سامي جاسم محمد الجبوري
- Born: 1970 or 1973; Mosul, Iraq
- Allegiance: Jama'at al-Tawhid wal-Jihad (2003–2004); Al-Qaeda in Iraq (2004–2006); Islamic State of Iraq (2006–2013); Islamic State of Iraq and the Levant (2013–2014); Islamic State (2014–2021)
- Service years: 2003–2021
- Rank: Infantry (2003–2014); Second-in-command (local) and Minister of Finance (2014–2021)
- Conflicts: Iraq War; War in Iraq (2013–2017); War against the Islamic State

Sami Jasim Muhammad al-Jaburi (Arabic: سامي جاسم محمد الجبوري; born 1970 or 1973), also known as Hajji Hamid (Arabic: حجي حميد), is an Iraqi member of the Islamic State who joined in 2014 and became the head minister of finance for the Islamic State headquarters in southern Mosul.

== Early life ==
Sami Jasim Muhammad al-Jaburi was born between 1970 and 1973 in Al-Sharqat, Saladin Governorate, Iraq or Mosul, Iraq.

=== Militantism ===
In 2003, al-Jaburi pledged allegiance to Abu Musab al-Zarqawi and joined Jama'at al-Tawhid wal-Jihad as a foot soldier as a response to the United States-led invasion of Iraq which he saw as unnecessary and a reason to sow Jihad against the United States. In 2005, U.S. forces apprehended al-Jaburi, who subsequently spent five years in a prison operated by the United States in Iraq. After his release in 2011, he re-associated with Al-Qaeda in Iraq, before joining the Islamic State of Iraq after AQI's dissolution, but by 2014, he had aligned himself with the Islamic State. Al-Jaburi was responsible for overseeing various aspects of the terror organization's administration, security, and financial operations before ascending to the position of deputy to al-Baghdadi and serving as the head of finance for ISIS, he was considered a trusted deputy to Abu Bakr al-Baghdadi before his assassination and then the deputy of the caliph that was named after Baghdadi, Abu Ibrahim al-Hashimi al-Qurashi, before his death. In 2012, during his time with the Islamic State of Iraq, al-Jaburi met with then-leader of the Islamic State of Iraq Abu Bakr al-Baghdadi, where al-Jaburi subsequently hold several roles across the diverse judicial, financial, and industrial ministries of the Islamic State. al-Jaburi joined the Islamic State during its rise in Iraq and the fall of Mosul where he became, as described by the United States Department of the Treasury, the sharia council chief and second-in-command in southern Mosul, Iraq, in August 2014.

On October 2, 2015, the United States Department of the Treasury classified Jasim as a Specially Designated Global Terrorist. While Iraqi Kurdish intelligence officials asserted that Jasim was killed during a collaborative operation conducted by joint United States and Kurdish forces near Al Anbar Governorate, western Iraq, in August 2016, subsequent reports indicated that he was not one of the individuals targeted in that raid. On August 29, 2019, the United States Department of the Treasury's Rewards for Justice Program offered a reward of up to US$5 million for information that would lead to Jasim's capture.

al-Jaburi played a crucial role in overseeing the financial management of the Islamic State's terrorist activities, having directed the organization's revenue-generating initiatives derived from the illegal trade of oil, gas, antiquities, and minerals following the Islamic State's capture of extensive territories in Iraq and Syria in 2014 where he was one of the twelve members of the Islamic States' senior leadership council, the appointed committee. As the minister of finance of the Islamic State, al-Jaburi would oversee over US$1 billion in assets controlled by the Islamic State. al-Jaburi oversaw the Tigris sector of the Islamic State in South Mosul as the deputy head.

=== Capture ===
On October 11, 2021, Iraqi security forces working alongside the Iraqi National Intelligence Service and Turkish intelligence services conducted a large-scaled external operation that ended with the capture of al-Jaburi in either Turkey or northwestern Syria. It was considered one of the most difficult cross-border intelligence operations ever conducted by Iraqi forces according to a tweet sent out by the prime minister of Iraq, Mustafa al-Kadhimi, on Twitter (now called X). After his capture, he was moved from the capture place (Syria or Turkey) to Iraqi custody where he is currently being held alive. The capture and arrest of al-Jaburi was considered a big loss for the Islamic State and its operations in Iraq and elsewhere.
