= Ahmad Medinsky =

Ahmad Medinsky was a Dagestani Salafi preacher.

== Background ==
He studied at the Islamic University of Medina (Saudi Arabia), from where he got his pseudonym "Medinsky". However, he was expelled for failure. He was part of a group of so-called "Medina students" — radicalized Dagestanis who studied Islam in Medina and practiced dawah (call to Islam).

== Preaching and propaganda activity ==
Before joining IS, Medinsky was known as a Salafi lecturer among the youth of the Caucasus, along with such figures as Nadir Abu Khalid (Medetov) and Kamil Abu Sultan. In March 2015, he swore allegiance to IS leader Abu Bakr al-Baghdadi. The oath was taken by Abu Jihad, an associate of IS field commander Abu Umar al-Shishani.

== Death ==
Ahmad Medinsky died on June 27, 2017 in Mosul (Iraq) during the battles for the city.
