= Ahmed al-Ruwaysi =

- Born: Tunisia
- Died: March 2015; Sirte, Libya
- Occupation: Islamic militant
- Known for: Member of the Islamic State

Ahmed al-Ruwaysi (Arabic: أحمد الرويسي; died March 2015), known as Abu Zakariya al-Tunisi, was a Tunisian Islamic militant and a member of the Islamic State.

== History ==
He was imprisoned for criminal offenses, and while in prison he embraced Salafi thought. He escaped from prison after the 2010-11 Tunisian revolution. He left Tunisia to Libya where he participated in battles and was in charge of a training camp. He began smuggling arms into Tunisia from Libya despite having a 15-year prison sentence on his head in the country. While in Tunisia he assisted Abū Sayyāf Kamāl Gafgāzī and Lutfī az-Zayn in their assassination of Tunisian politician Chokri Belaid. After this he became wanted by the Tunisian authorities so he returned to Libya, training operatives to send back to Tunisia. He pledged allegiance to the Islamic State while in Sirte and continued his role training militants.

== Death ==
He was killed in fighting between the 166th Battalion, a militia loyal to the General National Congress (2014) government based in Tripoli, and the forces of the Islamic State of Iraq and the Levant in Libya at Sirte, Libya in March 2015. Tunisian Interior Ministry spokesman Mohammed Ali Aroui told the state news agency that al-Ruwaysi’s death had been confirmed through "scientific means" and in co-ordination with Libyan authorities.
