= Abu Bakr al-Qahtani =

Shaykh Abu Bakr al-Qahtani
- أبو بكر القحطاني

Personal life
- Born: ʿUmar ibn Saʿūd al-Qaḥṭānī; December 22, 1976 Riyadh, Saudi Arabia
- Died: August 11, 2017 (aged 40) Sinjar, Iraq
- Cause of death: Assassination via drone strike
- Parent: Saʿūd al-Qaḥṭānī (father)
- Notable work: "An Explanation of the Third Nullifier of Islam"

Religious life
- Religion: Islam
- School: Hanbali
- Creed: Athari
- Movement: Wahhabi

Military service
- Allegiance: Islamic State
- Battles/wars: War in Iraq (2013–2017)

Abu Bakr al-Qahtani was a Saudi Islamic scholar and senior religious figure in the Islamic State. He was known for his strong opposition to the Hazimis.

== Background and Role ==
He studied at the Islamic University in Medina and emerged as a prominent cleric within ISIS's scholarly and administrative structures after the group declared its caliphate in 2014. He served as a member of the Delegated Committee (al-Lajna al-Mufawwada), a key executive and oversight body handling sharia-related matters and high-level decisions.

He was aligned with the scholarly faction associated with Turki al-Binali (often called the "Binali" trend), which emphasized institutional religious authority and more traditional jihadist-Salafi methodologies.

== Ideological position ==
Abu Bakr al-Qahtani became a leading voice opposing the Hazimi (or Hazimiyya) faction within ISIS. The Hazimis, inspired by the ideas of Ahmad al-Hazimi, advocated extremely expansive and rigid applications of takfir (excommunication of Muslims), including: Little to no excuse for ignorance (al-udhr bi'l-jahl). The concept of infinite regress in excommunication (al-takfir bi'l-tasalsul).

Al-Qahtani and like-minded scholars argued for a more measured position: takfir is "one of the requirements (or necessities) of the religion," not a foundational pillar (asl al-din) of Islam. This stance was viewed by hardliners as overly lenient or akin to irja'/Murji'ism (postponing judgment on faith).

In mid-2016, he was investigated by ISIS's Central Office for Overseeing the Shari'a Departments. The inquiry concluded that his views deviated from the methodology of Abu Musab al-Zarqawi and aligned more closely with figures like Abu Muhammad al-Maqdisi. He faced pressure to repent. In July 2017, leaked documents show he was advised to retract his "all-too-tolerant" positions on takfir.

He participated in extended theological debates against Hazimi positions and was respected by scholars who resisted the hardline shift within the group during its period of territorial decline and internal power struggles.

== Death ==
Abu Bakr al-Qahtani was killed in a U.S.-led coalition airstrike in Iraq on or around August 8, 2017. His death followed that of Turki al-Binali (May 2017) and came amid heightened internal tensions. Some ISIS dissenters described the circumstances as "murky" and speculated about possible internal facilitation or targeting due to his ideological opposition to the rising Hazimi influence and the Delegated Committee's May 2017 memorandum on takfir.

In September 2017, ISIS leadership issued a multi-part theological statement that partially aligned with al-Qahtani's and al-Binall's views on takfir, effectively rescinding or softening the earlier hardline memorandum. This was seen by some as posthumous vindication for the "Binali" scholarly trend.
