= Abu Yusaf =

ISIL commander

- Nickname: Abu Yusaf
- Born: c. September 1987 (age 38–39); Netherlands
- Allegiance: Islamic State
- Rank: High-level security commander
- Conflicts: War against the Islamic State

Abu Yusaf (born c. September 1987) is a high-level security commander in the Islamic State. According to an interview conducted with The Washington Post, Abu Yusaf is a nom-de-guerre of a 27-year-old European Islamist who joined IS in 2013.

== Biography ==
According to The Washington Post, Abu Yusaf would be born on approximately September 1987 somewhere in Netherlands, it is currently unknown what European country Yusaf was born in. It is unknown if Yusaf was born into a Muslim family or if he converted to Islam in later years of his life.

In 2013, Yusaf would travel to Syria and join the Islamic State, within about a year, Yusaf would already be considered a "high-level security commander" of the Islamic State. In 2014, Yusaf would be interviewed in a moving white Honda by The Washington Post in Reyhanlı, Turkey.

As of 2026, his status is currently unknown.
