= Abu Anisa al-Dagestani =

Abu Anisa al-Dagestani (also known as Abu Muhammad ar-Rusi) was a Dagestani foreign fighter and commander in the Islamic State.

== Career in IS ==
He began in a sharia role, serving as the person in charge of sharia law in the Haibar katiba (military unit). He advanced to become a military judge for the Raqqa governorate. He later joined a small, high-level four-person committee on manhaj (the correct way of belief, worship, and interacting with others). This committee also handled fatwas (religious rulings). He was reportedly one of only four people authorized to represent IS on religious matters. He additionally worked for Emni (the group's security/intelligence apparatus).

== Ideological Position and Internal Conflicts ==
He is listed among prominent Hazimis who gained institutional footholds (including seats in oversight bodies like the Office for Methodological Inquiry under the Delegates Committee) during 2016-2017 power struggles between Hazimi and more pragmatic factions.

== Departure from IS ==
He left IS in 2017. After departing, he authored the detailed letter criticizing leadership decisions on takfir and exposing internal purges and power dynamics. The letter circulated in chain-takfiri circles; its authenticity was reportedly verified by other former IS foreign fighters who knew him personally.
