= Abu Jurnas =

- Born: Radwan Talib Husayn Ismail al-Hamduni
- Died: November 2014
- Occupation: Senior Islamic State leader

Radwan Talib Husayn Ismail al-Hamduni (died 2014), known as Abu Jurnas, was a senior Islamic State leader.

== History ==
He was imprisoned in Camp Bucca at some point. He served as governor of the Islamic State's 'border province' and was IS emir of Mosul.

== Death ==
He was killed November 2014 in Mosul.
