= Nadir Abu Khalid =

Nadir Abu Khalid (real name: Nadir Medetov) was a Dagestani Salafi preacher.

He studied in the Sharia department at the Islamic University of Madihan in Saudi Arabia.

In 2014, he was detained in Makhachkala (Dagestan) under suspicion of illegal weapons possession (relatives claimed the items were planted). He was placed under house arrest for a period.

In 2015, Nadir Abu Khalid swore allegiance to Islamic State (IS) leader Abu Bakr al-Baghdadi.
