= Othman al-Nazih =

Saudi religious scholar (died 2015)

Othman al-Nazih (Arabic: عثمان آل نازح) was a Saudi prominent religious scholar of the Islamic State.

Sheikh Othman al-Nazih completed his education in Saudi Arabia, obtained a master's degree and then a doctorate, after which he was a teacher of Sharia sciences at the Islamic University of Riyadh.

Then the sheikh was forbidden to teach, so he moved to Syria, followed by many of his students.

The sheikh took a high position in the Islamic State and issued fatwas. In 2015, the sheikh died in the Battle of Kobani.
