= Islamic State =

Salafi jihadist militant organisation

- الدَّولةُ الإِسْلَامِيَّة ad-Dawla al-Islāmiyya
- Flag
- Other name: ISIS, ISIL, IS, Daesh
- Founder: Abu Bakr al-Baghdadi X
- Leaders: Abu Hafs al-Hashimi al-Qurashi (2023–present) Former: Abu Bakr al-Baghdadi (2014–2019) X; Abu Ibrahim al-Hashimi al-Qurashi (2019–2022) X; Abu al-Hasan al-Hashimi al-Qurashi (2022) †; Abu al-Hussein al-Husseini al-Qurashi (2022–2023) †
- Dates active: Origins: 1999–2014: 1999: Abu Mus'ab al-Zarqawi establishes Jama'at al-Tawhid wal-Jihad; Establishment of Jaish al-Ta'ifa al-Mansurah by Abu Omar al-Baghdadi and Jamaat Jaysh Ahl al-Sunnah wa-l-Jamaah by Abu Bakr al-Baghdadi; October 2004: Zarqawi pledges allegiance to al-Qaeda and forms al-Qaeda in Iraq; 15 January 2006: Formation of Mujahideen Shura Council in Iraq; 13 October 2006: Declaration of an Islamic State of Iraq and organizational independence from al-Qaeda; 8 April 2013: Abu Bakr al-Baghdadi changes the name of the ISI group to the "Islamic State of Iraq and the Levant" (ISIL) and announces territorial expansion in the Levant; 3 February 2014: Beginning of Al-Qaeda–Islamic State conflict; Islamic State: 2014–present: 29 June 2014: Declaration of caliphate and renamed to the "Islamic State"; 13 November 2014: Claim of territory in Libya, Egypt, Algeria, Saudi Arabia, Yemen; 29 January 2015: Claim of territory in South Asia; 12 March 2015: Claim of territory in Nigeria; 23 June 2015: Claim of territory in North Caucasus; 20 July 2017: Capture of Mosul by Iraqi forces; 17 October 2017: Capture of Raqqa by SDF forces; 23 March 2019: Loses all of its territory in Syria; 27 October 2019: Killing of Abu Bakr al-Baghdadi; 3 February 2022: Killing of Abu Ibrahim al-Hashimi al-Qurashi
- Groups: Groups: Algeria Province (until 2016); Bengal Province; Caucasus Province; Central Africa Province; Allied Democratic Forces; Khorasan Province; Jamaat-ul-Ahrar (2015–2016); Jundallah (Pakistan) (2014–2017); Mullah Dadullah Front (2015–2016); Libya Province (until 2021); Pakistan Province; Philippines Province; Ansar Khalifa Philippines (until 2021); Maute Group; Bangsamoro Islamic Freedom Fighters; Sahel Province; (Islamic State) Lakurawa; Somalia Province; West Africa Province; Boko Haram (until 2016); Yemen Province (until 2022); East Asia Province; (Islamic State) Jamaah Ansharut Daulah (until 2022); (Islamic State) Ajang Ajang group (until 2019); (Islamic State) Jamaah Ansharut Tauhid (until 2014); East Indonesia Mujahideen (until 2022); Katibah Nusantara (until 2019); Hawran Province (until 2018); Mozambique Province; (Islamic State) Al-Shabaab; Hind Province; Jammu and Kashmir Province (until 2019); Turkey Province; Azerbaijan Province; Tunisia Province (until 2022); Iraq Province; Kurdistan Province (until 2024); Sheikh Omar Hadid Brigade (until 2019); Al-Khansaa Brigade (until 2017); Brussels Islamic State terror cell (until 2016); Saudi Arabia Province (until 2017); Sinai Province (until 2023); Egypt Province (until 2018); Unorganized cells: Ansar al-Khilafah Brazil (until 2018); Die Wahre Religion (until 2016); Profetens Ummah (until 2016)
- Headquarters: Badiyat al-Sham, Syria (2025 - Present) Former: Baqubah, Iraq (2006–2007); No central headquarters (2007–2013); Raqqa, Syria (2013–2017); Mayadin, Syria (June–October 2017); Al-Qa'im, Iraq (October–November 2017); Abu Kamal, Syria (November 2017); Hajin, Syria (November 2017 – December 2018); Al-Susah, Syria (December 2018 – January 2019); Al-Marashidah, Syria (January–February 2019); Al-Baghuz Fawqani, Syria (February–March 2019); Northwestern Idlib Governorate, Syria (March 2019–2025)
- Active regions: See territory of the Islamic State
- Ideology: Daeshism: Theocracy; Qutbism; Takfirism; Wahhabism; Salafism; Salafi jihadism; Islamic fundamentalism; Anti-Yazidi sentiment; Turkophobia; Shiaphobia; Christianophobia; Hinduphobia; Homophobia; Antisemitism; Misogyny
- Status: Active
- Size: List of combatant numbers: Inside Syria and Iraq: 1,500–3,000 (UN 2024 report); 5,000–10,000 (UN Security Council 2019 report); 28,600–31,600 (July 2018) (2016 US Defense Department estimate); 200,000 (2015 claim by Iraqi Kurdistan Chief of Staff); 100,000 (2015 Jihadist claim); 35,000–100,000 (at peak, US State Department estimate); Outside Syria and Iraq: 32,600–57,900 (See Military activity of ISIL for more detailed estimates.); Estimated total: 61,200–257,900; Civilian population: In 2015 (near max extent): 8–12 million; In 2022 (ISWAP): 800,000–3,000,000
- Wars: See list of wars and battles involving the Islamic State
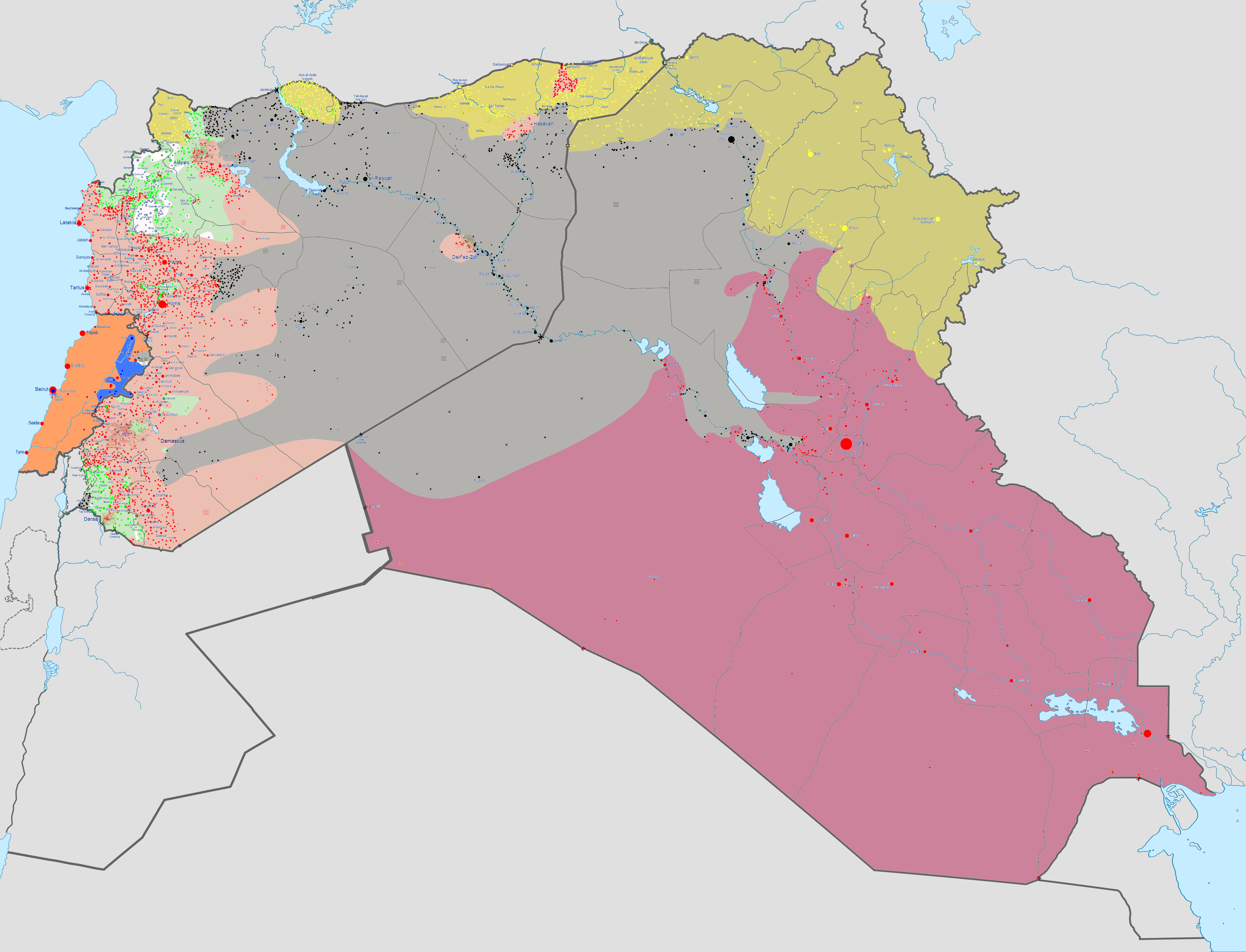
- IS territory in grey, at the time of its greatest territorial extent (May 2015) Map legend: Islamic State; Iraqi government; Syrian government; Lebanese government; Iraqi Kurdistan forces; Syrian Kurdistan forces; Syrian opposition forces; Turkish Armed Forces; Al-Nusra Front; Hezbollah; Note: Iraq and Syria contain large desert areas with sparse populations. These areas are mapped as under the control of forces holding roads and towns within them.

The Islamic State (IS), (Note: Arabic: الدَّولةُ الإِسْلَامِيَّة, romanised: ad-Dawla al-Islāmiyya.) also known as the Islamic State of Iraq and the Levant (ISIL), (Note: Abu Mohammad al-Adnani said in 2014 "the words 'Iraq' and 'the Levant' have been removed from the name of the Islamic State in official papers and documents." As of 2026, it is still called "ISIL" by some sources.) the Islamic State of Iraq and Syria (ISIS), and by its Arabic acronym Da'esh, (Note: Arabic: داعش The group dislikes the term as it sounds similar to the Arabic words for "bigot" or "to trample down," depending on conjugation. The group has threatened to cut out the tongues of anyone who refers to the group as "Da'esh" and prefers its full name, "Islamic State," as it lends them a sense of legitimacy.) is a transnational Salafi jihadist militant organisation and internationally unrecognised quasi-state. IS occupied a significant amount of territory in Syria during the Syrian civil war and in Iraq when U.S. troops withdrew after the Iraq war. In 2014 the group proclaimed itself to be a worldwide caliphate and claimed religious and political authority over all Muslims worldwide, a claim not accepted by the vast majority of Muslims. It is designated as a terrorist organisation by the United Nations, making it subject to binding counterterrorism sanctions in every UN member state, including all Muslim countries. (Note: The designation requires every UN member state to enforce the Security Council's sanctions against IS, including asset freezes, travel bans, and arms embargos.)

By the end of 2015, its self-declared caliphate ruled an area with a population of about 12 million, where they enforced their extremist interpretation of Islamic law, managed an annual budget exceeding US$1 billion, and commanded more than 30,000 fighters. After a grinding conflict with American, Iraqi, and Kurdish forces, IS lost control of its Middle Eastern territories by 2019, subsequently reverting to insurgency from remote hideouts while continuing its propaganda efforts. These efforts have garnered a significant following in northern and Sahelian Africa, where IS still controls a significant territory.

Its creation dates back to January 2006, when Al-Qaeda in Iraq, along with seven other jihadist groups, formed the Mujahideen Shura Council, which on 15 October 2006 disbanded to form the Islamic State of Iraq. After intervening in the Syrian Civil War, the group later changed its name to Islamic State of Iraq and Levant in 2013, before declaring itself to be a worldwide caliphate in 2014, called simply the Islamic State (الدَّولةُ الإِسْلَامِيَّة, ad-Dawlah al-Islāmiyya).

During its rule in Syria and Iraq, the group became notorious for its brutality. It committed genocides against Yazidis and Iraqi Turkmen; engaged in persecution of Christians, Shia Muslims, and Mandaeans; publicised videos of beheadings of soldiers, journalists, and aid workers; and destroyed cultural sites. The group has perpetrated terrorist massacres in territories outside of its control, such as the November 2015 Paris attacks, the 2024 Kerman bombings in Iran, and the 2024 Crocus City Hall attack in Russia. Lone wolf attacks inspired by the group have also taken place.

After 2015, the Iraqi Armed Forces and the Syrian Democratic Forces pushed back IS and degraded its financial and military infrastructure, assisted by advisors, weapons, training, supplies, and airstrikes by the American-led coalition and Iranian proxy forces, and later by Russian airstrikes, bombings, cruise missile attacks, and scorched-earth tactics across Syria, which focused mostly on razing Syrian opposition strongholds rather than IS bases. By March 2019, IS lost the last of its territories in West Asia, although its affiliates maintain a significant territorial presence in Africa as of 2025.

== Name ==
The Islamic State, abbreviated IS, is also known as the Islamic State of Iraq and the Levant (ISIL /ˈaɪsɪl/ EYE-sil), the Islamic State of Iraq and Syria (ISIS /ˈaɪsɪs/ EYE-siss), and by its Arabic acronym Daesh (داعش, Dāʿish, IPA: [ˈdaːʕɪʃ]), and also as Dawlat al-Islām (دولة الإسلام). In April 2013, having expanded into Syria, the group adopted the name ad-Dawla al-Islāmiyya fī l-ʿIrāq wa-sh-Shām (الدَّولةُ الإِسْلَامِيَّة فِي ٱلْعِرَاق وَٱلشَّام). As al-Shām is a region often compared with the Levant or the region of Syria, the group's name has been variously translated as "Islamic State of Iraq and al-Sham", "Islamic State of Iraq and Syria" (both abbreviated as ISIS), or "Islamic State of Iraq and the Levant" (abbreviated as ISIL). In 2014, Dar al-Ifta al-Misriyyah dubbed ISIS as "QSIS" for "al-Qaeda Separatists in Iraq and Syria", arguing that the group does not represent the vast majority of Muslims.

While the use of either one or the other acronym has been the subject of debate, the distinction between the two and its relevance has been considered less important. Of greater relevance is the name Daesh, which is an acronym of ISIL's Arabic name ad-Dawla al-Islamiyya fī l-ʿIrāq wa-sh-Shām, or Daesh. This name is widely used among the Muslim world, as well as ISIL's Arabic-speaking detractors, for example when referring to the group whilst speaking amongst themselves, although—and to a certain extent because—it is considered derogatory, as it resembles the Arabic words Daes ("one who crushes, or tramples down, something underfoot") and Dāhis (loosely translated as "one who sows discord"). Within areas under its control, ISIL considers use of the name Daesh punishable by flogging.

In late June 2014, the group renamed itself ad-Dawla al-Islāmiyya (lit. 'Islamic State' or IS), declaring itself a worldwide caliphate. The name "Islamic State" and the group's claim to be a caliphate have been widely rejected, with the UN, various governments, and mainstream Muslim groups refusing to use the new name. The group's declaration of a new caliphate in June 2014 and its adoption of the name "Islamic State" have been criticised and ridiculed by Muslim scholars and rival Islamists both inside and outside the territory it controls.

In a speech in September 2014, United States president Barack Obama said that ISIL was neither Islamic (on the basis that no religion condones the killing of innocents) nor a state (in that no government recognises the group as a state), while many object to using the name Islamic State owing to the far-reaching religious and political claims to authority which that name implies. The United Nations Security Council, the United States, Canada, Turkey, Australia, the United Kingdom, and other countries generally call the group ISIL, while much of the Arab world uses the Arabic acronym Dāʻish or Daesh. France's Foreign Minister Laurent Fabius said: "This is a terrorist group and not a state. I do not recommend using the term Islamic State because it blurs the lines between Islam, Muslims, and Islamists. The Arabs call it 'Daesh' and I will be calling them the 'Daesh cutthroats'." Retired general John Allen, the U.S. envoy appointed to co-ordinate the coalition; U.S. Army Lieutenant General James Terry, head of operations against the group; and Secretary of State John Kerry had all shifted towards use of the term Daesh by December 2014, which nonetheless remained a pejorative in 2021.

== Purpose and strategy ==
=== Ideology ===
The ideology of the Islamic State has been described as being a hybrid of Salafism, Salafi jihadism, Islamic fundamentalism, Wahhabism, and Qutbism, as well as other doctrines.

According to Robert Manne, there is a "general consensus" that the ideology of the Islamic State is "primarily based upon the writings of the radical Egyptian theoretician Sayyid Qutb". The Muslim Brotherhood began the trend of political Islamism in the 20th century, seeking gradual establishment of a new Caliphate, a comprehensive Islamic society ruled by sharia law. Qutb's doctrines of jahiliyya (pre-Islamic ignorance), hakimiyya (divine sovereignty), and takfir of entire societies formed a radicalised vision of the Muslim Brotherhood's political Islam project. Qutbism became the precursor to all jihadist thought, from Abdullah Azzam to Zawahiri and to Daesh. Alongside Sayyid Qutb, the most invoked ideological figures of IS include Ibn Taymiyya, Abdullah Azzam, and Abu Bakr Naji.

Although IS claims to adhere to the Salafi theology of Ibn Taymiyyah, it rejects traditional Salafi interpretations as well as the four Sunni schools of law, and anathematises the majority of Salafis as heretics. IS ideologues rarely uphold adherence to Islamic scholarship and law manuals for reference, mostly preferring to derive rulings based on self-interpretation of the Qur'an and Muslim traditions.

Abu Omar al-Baghdadi, the first Emir of the Islamic State of Iraq, was radicalised as a Muslim Brotherhood member during his youth. Motaz Al-Khateeb states that religious texts and Islamic jurisprudence "alone cannot explain the emergence" of Daesh since the Muslim Brotherhood and Daesh "draw on the same Islamic jurisprudence" but "are diametrically opposite" in strategy and behaviour. Through the official statement of beliefs originally released by al-Baghdadi in 2007 and subsequently updated since June 2014, ISIL defined its creed as "a middle way between the extremist Kharijites and the lax Murji'ites". ISIL's ideology represents radical Jihadi-Salafi Islam, a strict, puritanical form of Sunni Islam. Muslim organisations like Islamic Networks Group (ING) in America have argued against this interpretation of Islam. ISIL promotes religious violence, and regards Muslims who do not agree with its interpretations as infidels or apostates.

According to Hayder al Khoei, IS's philosophy is represented by the symbolism in the Black Standard variant of the legendary battle flag of Muhammad that it has adopted: flag of IS shows the Seal of Muhammad within a white circle, with the phrase above it, "There is no god but Allah". This symbolism is said to symbolise IS's belief that it represents the restoration of the caliphate of early Islam, with all the political, religious, and eschatological ramifications that this would imply.

Abu Abdullah al-Muhajir, an Egyptian Jihadist theoretician and ideologue is considered as the key inspiration for early figures of IS. Al-Muhajir's legal manual on violence, Fiqh ad-Dima (The Jurisprudence of Jihad or The Jurisprudence of Blood), was adopted by IS as its standard reference for justifying its extraordinary acts of violence. The book has been described by counter-terrorism scholar Orwa Ajjoub as rationalising and justifying "suicide operations, the mutilation of corpses, beheading, and the killing of children and non-combatants". His theological and legal justifications influenced IS, al-Qaeda, and Boko Haram, as well as several other jihadi terrorist groups. Media outlets have compared his reference manual to Abu Bakr Naji's Management of Savagery, widely read among IS's commanders and fighters.

IS adheres to global jihadist principles and follows the hard-line ideology of al-Qaeda and many other modern-day jihadist groups.

For their guiding principles, the leaders of the Islamic State ... are open and clear about their almost exclusive commitment to the Wahhabi movement of Sunni Islam. The group circulates images of Wahhabi religious textbooks from Saudi Arabia in the schools it controls. Videos from the group's territory have shown Wahhabi texts plastered on the sides of an official missionary van.

— David D. Kirkpatrick, The New York Times

According to The Economist, Saudi practices followed by the group include the establishment of religious police to root out "vice" and enforce attendance at Salah prayers, the widespread use of capital punishment, and the destruction or re-purposing of any non-Sunni religious buildings. Bernard Haykel has described IS leader Abu Bakr al-Baghdadi's creed as "a kind of untamed Wahhabism". Senior Saudi religious leaders have issued statements condemning IS, and attempting to distance the group from official Saudi religious beliefs. What connection, if any, there is between Salafi-Jihadism of IS and Wahhabism and Salafism proper is disputed. IS borrowed two elements of Qutbism and 20th century Islamism into its version of Wahhabi worldview. While Wahhabism shuns violent rebellion against earthly rulers, IS embraces political call to revolutions. While historically Wahhabis were not champion activists of a Caliphate, IS borrowed the idea of restoration of a global Caliphate.

Although the religious character of IS is mostly Wahhabi, it departs from the Wahhabi tradition in four critical aspects: dynastic alliance, call to establish a global caliphate, sheer violence, and apocalyptism. IS did not follow the pattern of the first three Saudi states in allying the religious mission of the Najdi ulema with the Al Saud family, rather they consider them apostates. The call for a global caliphate is another departure from Wahhabism. The caliphate, understood in Islamic law as the ideal Islamic polity uniting all Muslim territories, does not figure much in traditional Najdi writings. Ironically, Wahhabism emerged as an anti-caliphate movement.

Although violence was not absent in the First Saudi State, Islamic State's displays of beheading, immolation, and other forms of violence aimed at inspiring fear are not in imitation of early Saudi practices. They were introduced by Abu Musab Al-Zarqawi, former leader of Al-Qaeda in Iraq, who took inspiration from the Egyptian Jihadi scholar, Abu Abdallah Al Muhajir. It is the latter's legal manual on violence, popularly known as Fiqh ad-Dima (The Jurisprudence of Blood), that is the Islamic State's standard reference for justifying its acts of violence. The Islamic State's apocalyptic dimension also lacks a mainstream Wahhabi precedent.

IS aims to return to the early days of Islam, rejecting all innovations in the religion, which it believes corrupts its original spirit. It condemns later caliphates and the Ottoman Empire for deviating from what it calls pure Islam and seeks to revive the original Qutbist project of the restoration of a global caliphate that is governed by a strict Salafi-Jihadi doctrine. Following Salafi-Jihadi doctrines, IS condemns the followers of secular law as disbelievers, putting the current Saudi Arabian government in that category.

IS believes that only a legitimate authority can undertake the leadership of jihad and that the first priority over other areas of combat, such as fighting non-Muslim countries, is the purification of Islamic society. For example, IS regards the Palestinian Sunni group Hamas as apostates who have no legitimate authority to lead jihad and see fighting Hamas as the first step towards confrontation by IS with Israel.

Yemeni journalist Abdulelah Haider Shaye said:

The Islamic State was drafted by Sayyid Qutb, taught by Abdullah Azzam, globalized by Osama bin Laden, transferred to reality by Abu Musab al-Zarqawi, and implemented by al-Baghdadis: Abu Omar and Abu Bakr. [...]

The Islamic State added a focus on sectarianism to a layer of radical views. In particular, it linked itself to the Salafi-jihadi movement that evolved out of the Afghan jihad.

— Hassan Hassan, The Sectarianism of the Islamic State: Ideological Roots and Political Context.

=== Islamic eschatology ===
One difference between IS and other Islamist and jihadist movements, including al-Qaeda, is the group's emphasis on eschatology and apocalypticism—that is, a belief in a final Day of Judgment by God. IS believes that it will defeat the army of "Rome" at the town of Dabiq.

The noted scholar of militant Islamism Will McCants writes:

References to the End Times fill Islamic State propaganda. It's a big selling point with foreign fighters, who want to travel to the lands where the final battles of the apocalypse will take place. The civil wars raging in those countries today [Iraq and Syria] lend credibility to the prophecies. The Islamic State has stoked the apocalyptic fire. ... For Bin Laden's generation, the apocalypse wasn't a great recruiting pitch. Governments in the Middle East two decades ago were more stable, and sectarianism was more subdued. It was better to recruit by calling to arms against corruption and tyranny than against the Antichrist. Today, though, the apocalyptic recruiting pitch makes more sense than before.

— William McCants, The ISIS Apocalypse: The History, Strategy, and Doomsday Vision of the Islamic State

=== Goals ===
Since at latest 2004, a significant goal of the group has been the foundation of a Sunni Islamic state. Specifically, ISIL has sought to establish itself as a caliphate, an Islamic state led by a group of religious authorities under a supreme leader—the caliph—who is believed to be the successor to Muhammad. In June 2014, ISIL published a document in which it claimed to have traced the lineage of its leader al-Baghdadi back to Muhammad, and upon proclaiming a new caliphate on 29 June, the group appointed al-Baghdadi as its caliph. As caliph, he demanded the allegiance of all devout Muslims worldwide according to Islamic jurisprudence (fiqh).

ISIL detailed its goals in its Dabiq magazine, saying it would continue to seize land and take over the entire Earth until its:

Blessed flag...covers all eastern and western extents of the Earth, filling the world with the truth and justice of Islam and putting an end to the falsehood and tyranny of jahiliyyah [state of ignorance], even if America and its coalition despise such.

— 5th edition of Dabiq, the Islamic State's English-language magazine, in 2014

According to German journalist Jürgen Todenhöfer, who spent ten days embedded with ISIL in Mosul, the view he kept hearing was that ISIL wants to "conquer the world", and that all who do not believe in the group's interpretation of the Quran will be killed. Todenhöfer was struck by the ISIL fighters' belief that "all religions who agree with democracy have to die", and by their "incredible enthusiasm"—including enthusiasm for killing "hundreds of millions" of people.

When the caliphate was proclaimed, ISIL stated: "The legality of all emirates, groups, states and organisations becomes null by the expansion of the khilafah's [caliphate's] authority and the arrival of its troops to their areas." This was a rejection of the political divisions in Southwestern Asia that were established by the UK and France during World War I in the Sykes–Picot Agreement.

All non-Muslim areas would be targeted for conquest after the Muslim lands were dealt with, according to the Islamist manual Management of Savagery.

=== Strategy ===
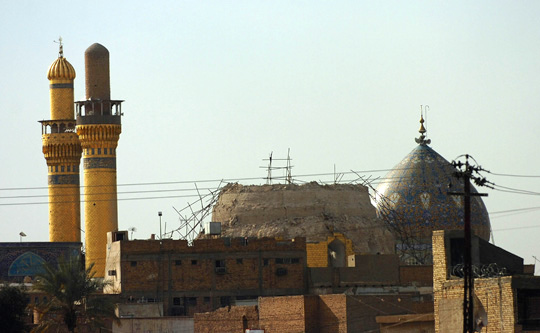
The Al-Askari Mosque, one of the holiest sites in Shia Islam, after the first attack by Islamic State of Iraq in 2006

Documents found after the death of Samir Abd Muhammad al-Khlifawi, a former colonel in the intelligence service of the Iraqi Air Force before the US invasion who had been described as "the strategic head" of ISIL, detailed planning for the ISIL takeover of northern Syria, which made possible "the group's later advances into Iraq". Al-Khlifawi called for the infiltration of areas to be conquered with spies who would find out "as much as possible about the target towns: Who lived there, who was in charge, which families were religious, which Islamic school of religious jurisprudence they belonged to, how many mosques there were, who the imam was, how many wives and children he had and how old they were". Following this surveillance and espionage would come murder and kidnapping—"the elimination of every person who might have been a potential leader or opponent". In Raqqa, after rebel forces drove out the Assad regime and ISIL infiltrated the town, "first dozens and then hundreds of people disappeared".

Security and intelligence expert Martin Reardon has described IS's purpose as being to psychologically "break" those under its control, "so as to ensure their absolute allegiance through fear and intimidation", while generating "outright hate and vengeance" among its enemies. Jason Burke, a journalist writing on Salafi jihadism, has written that IS's goal is to "terrorize, mobilize [and] polarize". Its efforts to terrorise are intended to intimidate civilian populations and force governments of the target enemy "to make rash decisions that they otherwise would not choose". It aims to mobilise its supporters by motivating them with, for example, spectacular deadly attacks deep in Western territory (such as the November 2015 Paris attacks), to polarise by driving Muslim populations—particularly in the West—away from their governments, thus increasing the appeal of IS's self-proclaimed caliphate among them, and to: "Eliminate neutral parties through either absorption or elimination". Journalist Rukmini Maria Callimachi also emphasises IS's interest in polarisation or in eliminating what it calls the "grey zone" between the black (non-Muslims) and white (IS). "The gray is moderate Muslims who are living in the West and are happy and feel engaged in the society here."

A work published online in 2004 entitled Management of Savagery (Idarat at Tawahoush), described by several media outlets as influential on IS and intended to provide a strategy to create a new Islamic caliphate, recommended a strategy of attack outside its territory in which fighters would "Diversify and widen the vexation strikes against the Crusader-Zionist enemy in every place in the Islamic world, and even outside of it if possible, so as to disperse the efforts of the alliance of the enemy and thus drain it to the greatest extent possible."

The group has been accused of attempting to "bolster morale" and distract attention from its loss of territory to enemies by staging terror attacks abroad (such as the 2016 Berlin truck attack, the 6 June 2017 attacks on Tehran, the 22 May 2017 bombing in Manchester, and the 3 June 2017 attacks in London that IS claimed credit for).

== Organisation ==
IS has been described as a militant group adhering to Salafi jihadism. Raqqa in Syria was under IS control from 2013 and in 2014 it became the group's de facto capital city. On 17 October 2017, following a lengthy battle that saw massive destruction to the city, the Syrian Democratic Forces (SDF) announced the full capture of Raqqa from IS.

=== Leadership and governance ===
From 2013 to 2019, IS was headed and run by Abu Bakr al-Baghdadi, the Islamic State's self-styled Caliph. Before their deaths, he had two deputy leaders, Abu Muslim al-Turkmani for Iraq and Abu Ali al-Anbari (also known as Abu Ala al-Afri) for Syria, both ethnic Turkmen. Advising al-Baghdadi were a cabinet of senior leaders, while its operations in Iraq and Syria are controlled by local 'emirs,' who head semi-autonomous groups that the Islamic State refers to as its provinces. Beneath the leaders are councils on finance, leadership, military matters, legal matters (including decisions on executions) foreign fighters' assistance, security, intelligence and media. In addition, a shura council has the task of ensuring that all decisions made by the governors and councils comply with the group's interpretation of sharia. While al-Baghdadi had told followers to "advise me when I err" in sermons, according to observers "any threat, opposition, or even contradiction is instantly eradicated".

According to Iraqis, Syrians, and analysts who study the group, almost all of IS's leaders—including the members of its military and security committees and the majority of its emirs and princes—are former Iraqi military and intelligence officers, specifically former members of Saddam Hussein's Ba'ath government who lost their jobs and pensions in the de-Ba'athification process after that regime was overthrown. The former Chief Strategist in the Office of the Coordinator for Counterterrorism of the US State Department, David Kilcullen, has said, "There undeniably would be no Isis if we had not invaded Iraq." It has been reported that Iraqis and Syrians have been given greater precedence over other nationalities within IS because the group needs the loyalties of the local Sunni populations in both Syria and Iraq in order to be sustainable. Other reports, however, have indicated that Syrians are at a disadvantage to foreign members, with some native Syrian fighters resenting "favouritism" allegedly shown towards foreigners over pay and accommodation.

In August 2016, media reports based on briefings by Western intelligence agencies suggested that IS had a multilevel secret service known in Arabic as Emni, established in 2014, that has become a combination of an internal police force and an external operations directorate complete with regional branches. The unit was believed to be under the overall command of IS's most senior Syrian operative, spokesman and propaganda chief Abu Mohammad al-Adnani until his death by airstrike in late August 2016.

On 27 October 2019, the United States conducted a special operation targeting al-Baghdadi's compound in Barisha, Idlib, Northwest Syria. The attack resulted in al-Baghdadi's death; caught by surprise and unable to escape, al-Baghdadi detonated a suicide vest, deliberately killing both himself and two children who had been living in the compound prior to the assault. U.S. president Donald Trump stated in a televised announcement that Baghdadi had, in fact, died during the operation and that American forces used support from helicopters, jets and drones through airspace controlled by Russia and Turkey. He said, "Russia treated us great... Iraq was excellent. We really had great cooperation" and Turkey knew they were going in. He thanked Turkey, Russia, Syria, Iraq and the Syrian Kurdish forces for their support. The Turkish Defence Ministry also confirmed on Sunday that Turkish and U.S. military authorities exchanged and coordinated information ahead of an attack in Syria's Idlib. Fahrettin Altun, a senior aide to Turkish president Tayyib Erdogan, also stated, among other things, "Turkey was proud to help the United States, our NATO ally, bring a notorious terrorist to justice" and that Turkey "will continue to work closely with the United States and others to combat terrorism in all its forms and manifestations." Kremlin spokesman Dmitry Peskov declined to say if the United States had told Russia about the raid in advance but said that its result if confirmed, represented a serious contribution by the United States to combat terrorism. Russia had previously claimed Baghdadi was killed in May 2017 by their airstrike.

In September 2019, a statement attributed to IS's propaganda arm, the Amaq news agency, claimed that Abdullah Qardash was named as al-Baghdadi's successor. Analysts dismissed this statement as a fabrication, and relatives were reported as saying that Qardash died in 2017. Rita Katz, a terrorism analyst and the co-founder of SITE Intelligence, noted that the alleged statement used a different font when compared to other statements and it was never distributed on Amaq or IS channels.

On 29 October 2019, Trump stated on social media that al-Baghdadi's "number one replacement" had been killed by American forces, without giving a name. A U.S. official later confirmed that Trump was referring to IS spokesman and senior leader Abul-Hasan al-Muhajir, who was killed in a U.S. airstrike in Syria two days earlier. On 31 October, IS named Abu Ibrahim al-Hashemi al-Qurayshi as Baghdadi's successor. On 3 February 2022, it was reported by a U.S. official that al-Hashimi killed himself and members of his family by triggering an explosive device, during a counter-terrorism raid by the U.S. Joint Special Operations Command. On 30 November 2022, IS announced that their next leader, Abu al-Hasan al-Hashimi al-Qurashi, had been killed in battle and named a successor, providing no additional information other than his pseudonym, Abu al-Hussein al-Husseini al-Qurashi, who was believed to be the Islamic State's first Syrian chief. A spokesman for U.S. Central Command confirmed that IS's leader had been killed in mid-October by anti-government rebels in southern Syria. On 16 February 2023, senior IS leader Hamza al-Homsi blew himself up in a U.S.-led raid in Syria. On 23 April 2023, IS leader Abu al-Hussein al-Husseini al-Qurashi was killed in an attack on his residence at Jindires, in the northwestern Idlib Governorate. Turkey claimed responsibility for his death, while the Islamic State claimed that al-Husseini al-Qurashi was killed in a shootout with Tahrir al-Sham (HTS) forces. Subsequently, the Islamic State named Abu Hafs al-Hashimi al-Qurashi as their new leader. In late August 2025, U.S. Special Forces carried out a helicopter raid at Atmeh, near the Turkish border region. They killed two senior IS leaders in the raid, including a figure who was believed to be next-in-line for the Islamic State leadership. Analysts believe that the Islamic State is headquartered in the northwestern Idlib Governorate region, near the Turkish border, ever since the group lost their last territorial stronghold at Al-Baghuz Fawqani in Spring 2019.

=== Civilians in Islamic State-controlled areas ===
In 2014, The Wall Street Journal estimated that eight million people lived in the Islamic State. The United Nations Commission on Human Rights has stated that IS "seeks to subjugate civilians under its control and dominate every aspect of their lives through terror, indoctrination, and the provision of services to those who obey". Civilians, as well as the Islamic State itself, have released footage of some of the human rights abuses.

Social control of civilians was imposed with IS's strict interpretation of sharia law, enforced by morality police forces known as Al-Hisbah and the all-women Al-Khanssaa Brigade, a general police force, courts, and other entities managing recruitment, tribal relations, and education. Al-Hisbah was led by Abu Muhammad al-Jazrawi.

In 2015, IS published a penal code including floggings, amputations, crucifixions, etc.

=== Military ===
==== Number of combatants ====
Country origins of foreign IS fighters (500 or more), ICSR estimate, 2018
Country	Fighters
Russia	5,000
Tunisia	4,000
Jordan	3,950
Saudi Arabia	3,244
Turkey	3,000
Uzbekistan	2,500
France	1,910
Morocco	1,699
Tajikistan	1,502
China	1,000
Germany	960
Lebanon	900
Azerbaijan	900
Kyrgyzstan	863
United Kingdom	860
Indonesia	800
Kazakhstan	600
Libya	600
Egypt	500
Turkmenistan	500
Belgium	500

Estimates of the size of IS's military have varied widely, from tens of thousands up to 200,000. In early 2015, journalist Mary Anne Weaver estimated that half of IS fighters were foreigners. A UN report estimated a total of 15,000 fighters from over 80 countries were in IS's ranks in November 2014. U.S. intelligence estimated an increase to around 20,000 foreign fighters in February 2015, including 3,400 from the Western world. In September 2015, the CIA estimated that 30,000 foreign fighters had joined IS.

According to Abu Hajjar, a former senior leader of IS, foreign fighters receive food, petrol and housing, but unlike native Iraqi or Syrian fighters, they do not receive payment in wages. Since 2012, more than 3,000 people from the central Asian countries have gone to Syria, Iraq or Afghanistan to join the Islamic State or Jabhat al Nusra.

==== Conventional weapons ====
IS relies mostly on captured weapons with major sources including Saddam Hussein's Iraqi stockpiles from the 2003–11 Iraq insurgency and weapons from government and opposition forces fighting in the Syrian civil war and during the post-US withdrawal Iraqi insurgency. The captured weapons, including armour, guns, surface-to-air missiles, and even some aircraft, enabled rapid territorial growth and facilitated the capture of additional equipment. For example, IS captured U.S.-made TOW anti-tank missiles supplied by the United States and Saudi Arabia to the Free Syrian Army in Syria. Ninety per cent of the group's weapons ultimately originated in China, Russia or Eastern Europe according to Conflict Armament Research.

==== Non-conventional weapons ====
The group uses truck and car bombs, suicide bombers and IEDs, and has used chemical weapons in Iraq and Syria. IS captured nuclear materials from Mosul University in July 2014, but is unlikely to be able to convert them into weapons. In September 2015 a U.S. official stated that IS was manufacturing and using mustard agent in Syria and Iraq, and had an active chemical weapons research team. IS has also used water as a weapon of war. The group closed the gates of the smaller Nuaimiyah dam in Fallujah in April 2014, flooding the surrounding regions, while cutting the water supply to the Shia-dominated south. Around 12,000 families lost their homes and 200 square kilometres (77 mi^{2}) of villages and fields were either flooded or dried up. The economy of the region also suffered with destruction of cropland and electricity shortages. During the Battle of Mosul, commercially available quadcopters and drones were being used by IS as surveillance and weapons delivery platforms using improvised cradles to drop grenades and other explosives. One IS drone base was struck and destroyed by two Royal Air Force Tornado using two Paveway IV guided bombs.

=== Women ===
IS publishes material directed at women, with media groups encouraging them to play supportive roles within IS, such as providing first aid, cooking, nursing and sewing skills, in order to become "good wives of jihad". In 2015, it was estimated that western women made up over 550, or 10%, of IS's western foreign fighters.

Until 2016, women were generally confined to a "women's house" upon arrival, which they were forbidden to leave. These houses were often small, dirty and infested with vermin and food supply was scarce. There they remained until they either had found a husband, or the husband they arrived with had completed his training. After being allowed to leave the confinement, women still generally spent most of their days indoors, where their lives are devoted to caring for their husbands and the vast majority of women in the conflict area have children. Mothers play an important role passing on IS ideology to their children. Widows are encouraged to remarry.

In a document entitled Women in the Islamic State: Manifesto and Case Study released by the media wing of IS's all-female Al-Khansaa Brigade, emphasis is given to the paramount importance of marriage and motherhood (as early as nine years old). Women should live a life of "sedentariness", fulfilling her "divine duty of motherhood" at home, with a few exceptions like teachers and doctors. Equality for women is opposed, as is education on non-religious subjects, the "worthless worldly sciences".

=== Finances ===
According to a 2015 study by the Financial Action Task Force, IS's five primary sources of revenue are as follows (listed in order of significance):

- proceeds from the occupation of territory (including control of banks, petroleum reservoirs, taxation, extortion, and robbery of economic assets)
- kidnapping for ransom
- donations from Saudi Arabia, Kuwait, Qatar and other Gulf states, often disguised as meant for "humanitarian charity"
- material support provided by foreign fighters
- fundraising through modern communication networks

Since 2012, IS has produced annual reports giving numerical information on its operations, somewhat in the style of corporate reports, seemingly in a bid to encourage potential donors.

In 2014, the RAND Corporation analysed IS's funding sources from documents captured between 2005 and 2010. It found that outside donations amounted to only 5% of the group's operating budgets, and that cells inside Iraq were required to send up to 20% of the income generated from kidnapping, extortion rackets and other activities to the next level of the group's leadership, which would then redistribute the funds to provincial or local cells that were in difficulties or needed money to conduct attacks. In 2016, RAND estimated that IS finances from its largest source of income—oil revenues and the taxes it extracts from people under its control—had fallen from about US$1.9 billion in 2014 to US$870 million in 2016.

In mid-2014, the Iraqi National Intelligence Service obtained information that IS had assets worth US$2 billion, making it the richest jihadist group in the world. About three-quarters of this sum was said to looted from Mosul's central bank and commercial banks in the city. However, doubt was later cast on whether IS was able to retrieve anywhere near that sum from the central bank, and even on whether the looting had actually occurred.

In 2022, the company Lafarge was found guilty in paying IS for the operation of its facilities. "In 2013–2014 the company transferred $6,000,000 to ISIL so they could continue company operations. This allowed the company to earn $70 million in sales revenue from a plant it operated in northern Syria, prosecutors said." Lafarge, which merged with Holcim in 2015, agreed to pay $778 million in forfeiture and fines as part of a plea agreement not to be convicted and sentenced to prison for providing material support to a terrorist organisation. No Lafarge executives were charged in the United States, while French authorities arrested some of the executives involved but did not provide names. The U.S. court lists six unnamed Lafarge executives. Lafarge evacuated the cement plant in September 2014, Afterwards IS took possession of the remaining cement and sold it for an estimated $3.21 million. SIX Swiss Exchange trading suspended trading for Holcim shares before the news became public. After trading resumed shares rose by 3.2%.

==== Monetary system ====
IS attempted to create a modern gold dinar by minting gold, silver, and copper coins, based on the coinage used by the Umayyad Caliphate in the seventh century. Despite a propaganda push for the currency, adoption appeared to have been minimal and its internal economy was effectively dollarised, even with regards to its own fines.

==== Education ====
The education in IS held territory was organised by the Diwan of Education. IS introduced its own curriculum, which did not include lessons in history, music, geography or art, but included lectures in Islamic Law, Sharia, and Jihad. The Diwan of Education was often in competition with the Diwan of Outreach and Mosques, which organised educational centres focused on the sharia.

Iman al-Bugha may have been chief of education under the caliphate. On social media she described what the education system was like: five years of primary education and four years of secondary, with “artificial and taboo subjects” prohibited. Students were supposed to be able to attend university at age fifteen and graduate by eighteen.

== Origins ==
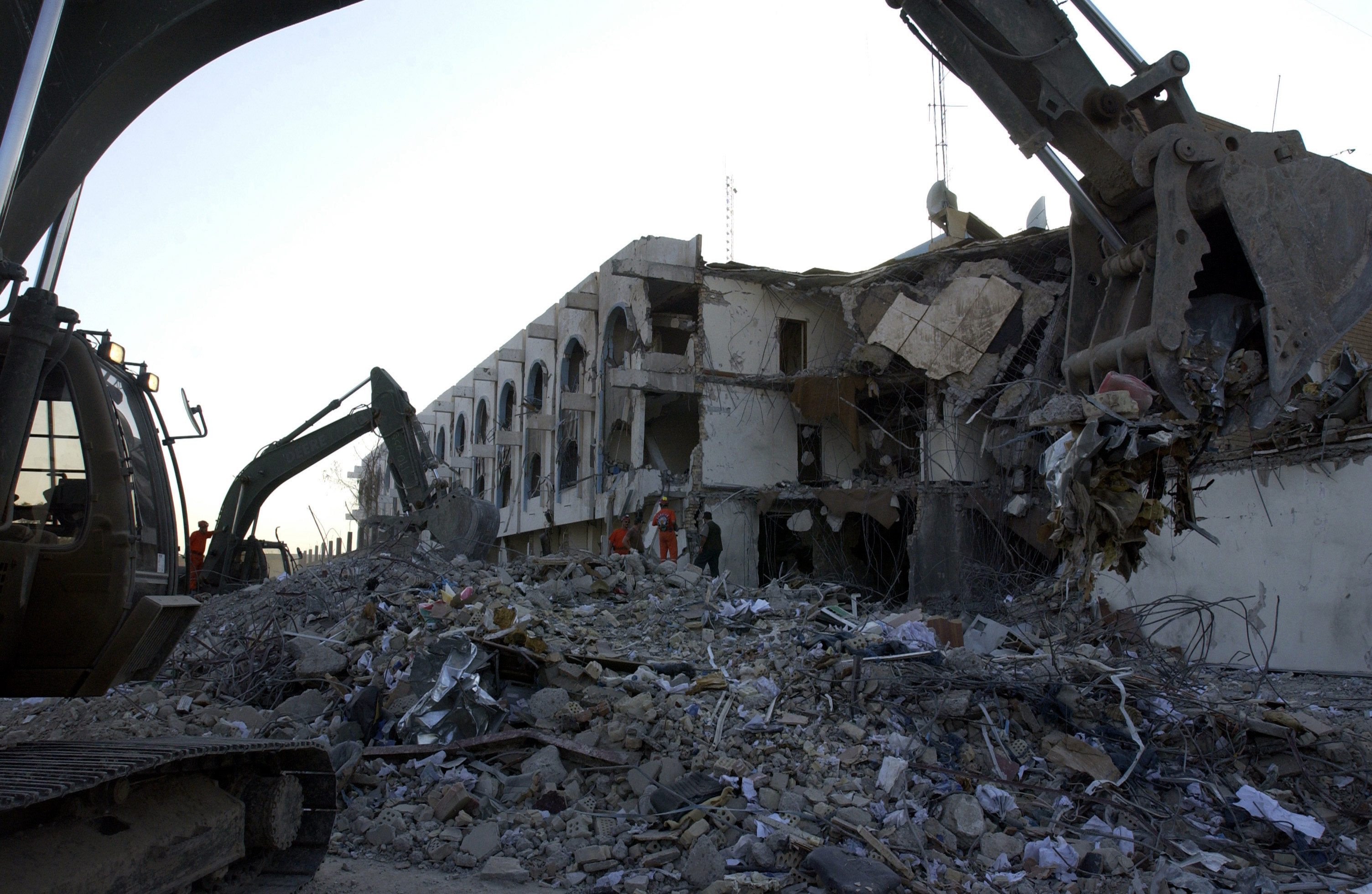
The UN headquarters building in Baghdad after the Canal Hotel bombing, on 22 August 2003

The group was founded in 1999 by Jordanian Salafi jihadist Abu Musab al-Zarqawi under the name Jamāʻat al-Tawḥīd wa-al-Jihād (lit. 'The Organisation of Monotheism and Jihad'). In a letter published by the Coalition Provisional Authority in February 2004, Zarqawi wrote that jihadis should use bombings to start an open sectarian war so that Sunnis from the Islamic world would mobilise against assassinations carried out by Shia, specifically the Badr Brigade, against Ba'athists and Sunnis.

It is possible that Zarqawi used some "small seed money" of $200,000 obtained from Al Qaeda to set up a training camp for the JTJ. The financial support from Al Qaeda came after Zarqawi was reluctant to be recruited by bin Laden. Following the 11 September Attacks and the decision to invade Iraq, the U.S. Secretary of State's presentation to the United Nations Security Council aimed to establish Zarqawi as the definitive link between Al Qaeda and Iraq. These claims were later disproven.

Powell's presentation was nevertheless instrumental in elevating Zarqawi's status and laying the groundwork for part of the foreign fighter faction of the Iraqi insurgency.

The JTJ officially pledged allegiance to al-Qaeda in a letter in October 2004, which drew more recruits, as well as financial and logistical support.

== Territorial control and claims ==
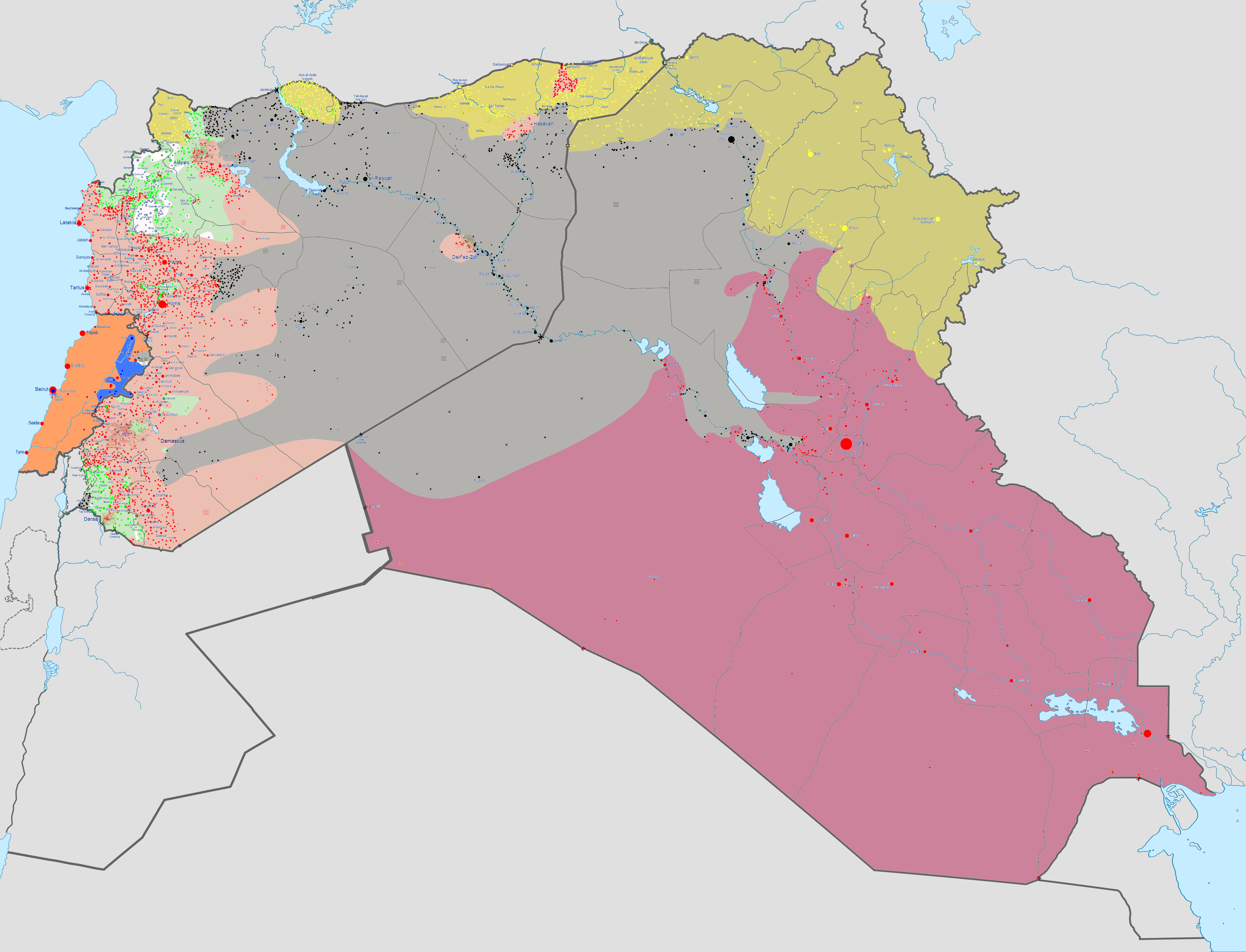
IS territory, in grey, at the time of its greatest territorial extent (May 2015). Map legend: Islamic State; Iraqi government; Syrian government; Lebanese government; Iraqi Kurdistan forces; Syrian Kurdistan forces; Syrian opposition forces; Turkish Armed Forces; Al-Nusra Front; Hezbollah; Note: Iraq and Syria contain large desert areas with sparse populations. These areas are mapped as under the control of forces holding roads and towns within them.

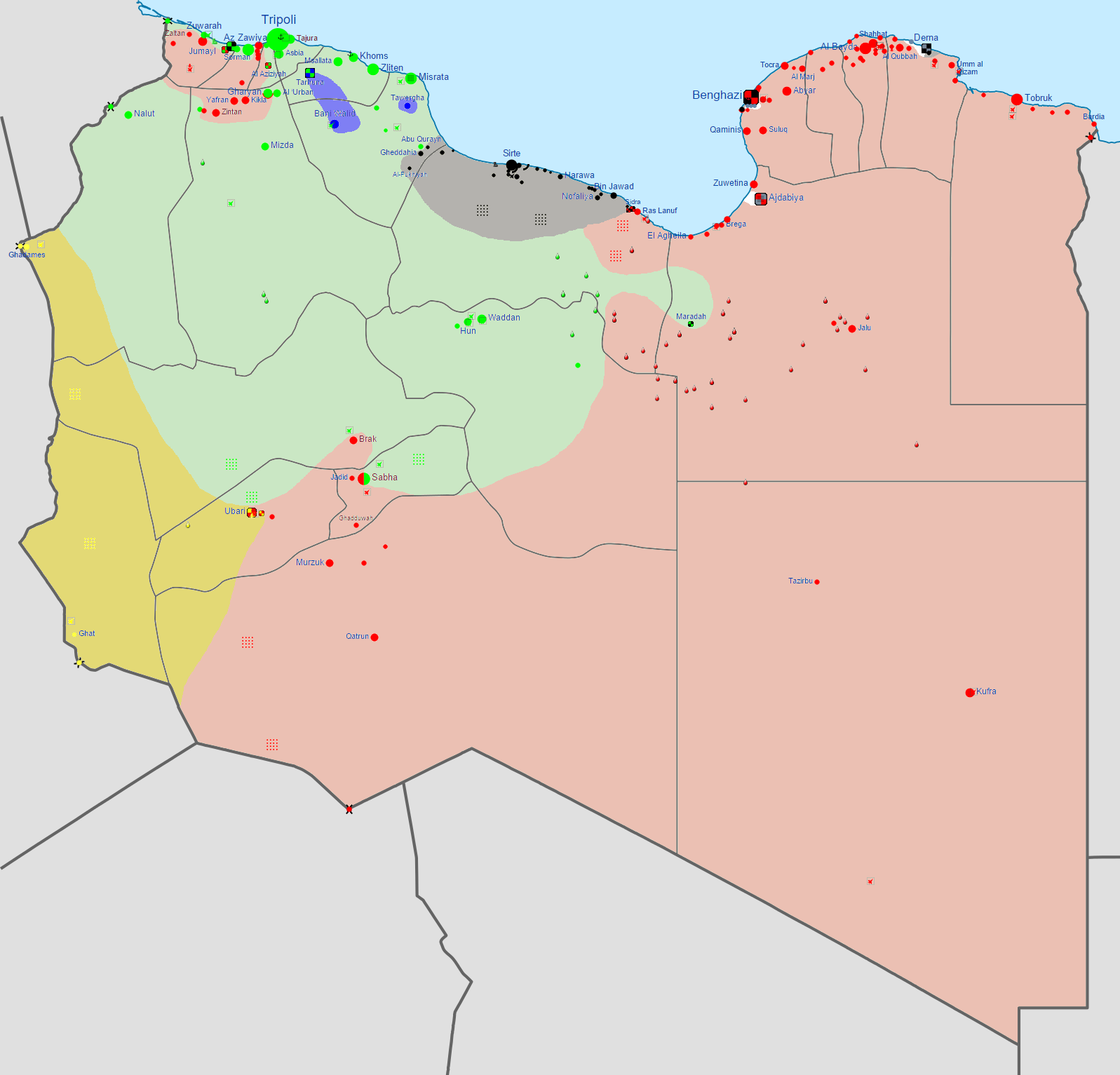
Military situation in Libya in early 2016: Ansar al-Sharia IS

As a self-proclaimed worldwide caliphate, IS claims religious, political and military authority over all Muslims worldwide, and that "the legality of all emirates, groups, states, and organisations, becomes null by the expansion of the khilāfah's [caliphate's] authority and arrival of its troops to their areas".

In Iraq and Syria, IS used many of those countries' existing governorate boundaries to subdivide territory it conquered and claimed; it called these divisions wilayah or provinces. By June 2015, IS had also established official "provinces" in Libya, Egypt (Sinai Peninsula), Saudi Arabia, Yemen, Algeria, Afghanistan, Pakistan, Nigeria and the North Caucasus. IS received pledges of allegiance and published media releases via groups in Somalia, Bangladesh, Indonesia, Myanmar, Thailand and the Philippines, but it has not announced any further official branches, instead identifying new affiliates as simply "soldiers of the caliphate".

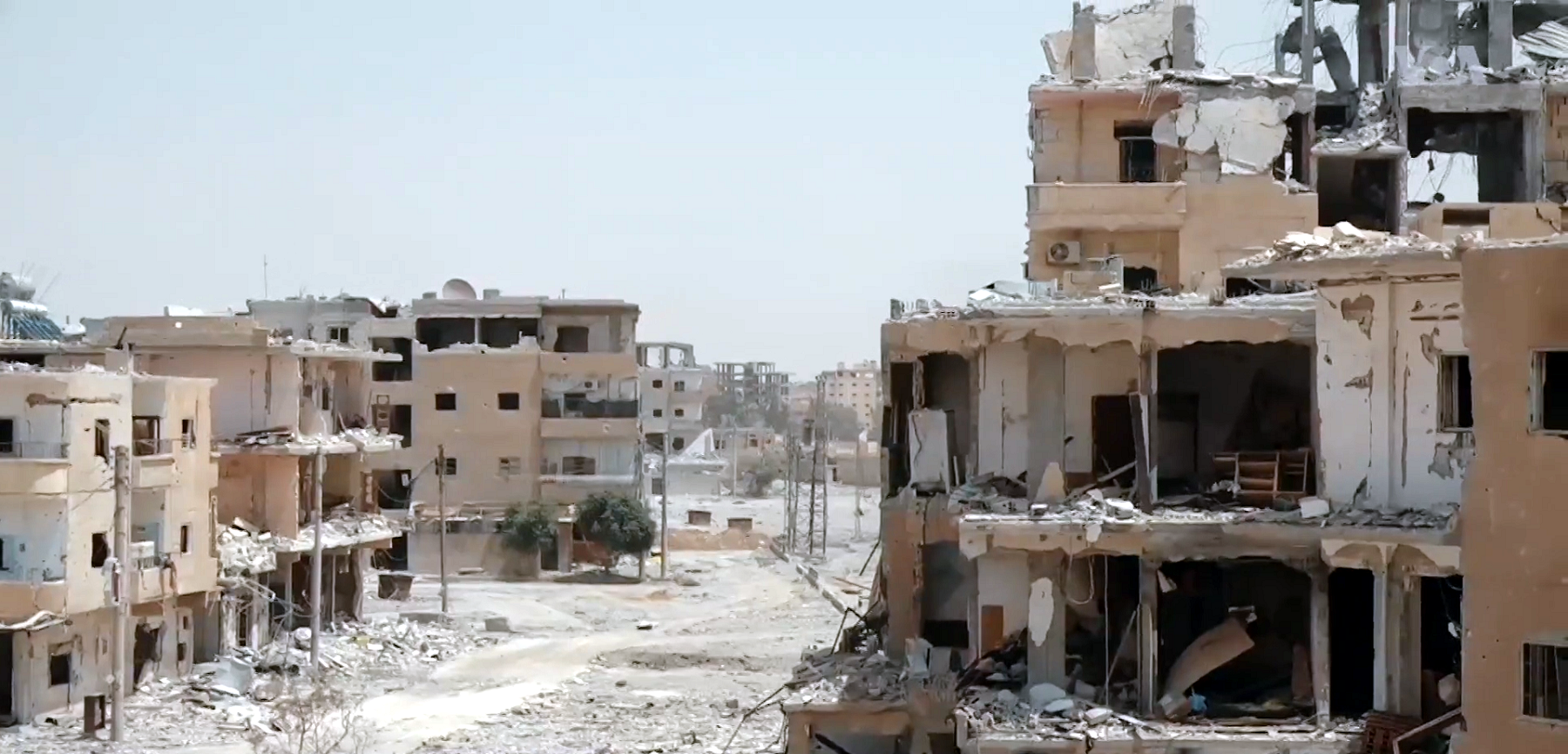
IS's capital Raqqa suffered extensive damage during the battle of Raqqa in June–October 2017

At its peak, IS was sometimes described as a quasi-state. By March 2019, IS had lost most of its territory in its former core areas in Syria and Iraq, and was reduced to a desert pocket as well as insurgent cells. Through late 2020 and early 2021, IS African affiliates had once again seized territory and settlements in conflicts such as the Boko Haram insurgency, in Nigeria and the Insurgency in Cabo Delgado, in Mozambique. Notable takeovers by IS include Mocímboa da Praia and the Sambisa Forest. On 17 November 2021, IS supporters urged establishment of "New Provinces" in Indonesia. In October 2022, IS's Sahel province captured the rural committee and town of Ansongo in Mali. In 2023–2024, IS still held a large territory in Africa.

== IS affiliates ==
=== In Africa ===
- Islamic State – Central Africa Province (IS-CAP) first appeared in 2018 and operates in the Democratic Republic of the Congo and Uganda since 2020. It emerged from the Ugandan Islamist group Allied Democratic Forces (ADF). As of 2024, it is estimated to number 1,500–2,000 fighters.
- Islamic State – Mozambique Province (ISMP), formerly part of Islamic State – Central Africa Province (IS-CAP), was formed in 2022. It is primarily active in Mozambique's Cabo Delgado province. It emerged from the Mozambican Islamist group Al-Shabaab. Its current size is unknown.
- Islamic State – Sahel Province (ISSP), formerly known as Islamic State in the Greater Sahara (IS-GS), operates mainly in Mali, Niger and Burkina Faso. IS-GS was formed in 2015. From March 2019 to 2022, IS-GS was formally part of the Islamic State – West Africa Province (ISWAP); when it was also called "ISWAP-Greater Sahara". As of 2025, ISSP is estimated to have 2,000–3,000 fighters.
- Islamic State – Somalia Province (ISSP) operates primarily in Puntland in northern Somalia. The group first appeared in 2015 when elements within the Somali Islamist group Al-Shabaab defected and pledged allegiance to IS. Its size is estimated to be 100-200 fighters as of 2025.
- Islamic State – West Africa Province (ISWAP) is primarily active in the Chad Basin of Niger, Nigeria, Cameroon and Chad. It emerged in 2015 after a split from Boko Haram. As of 2025, ISWAP is estimated to have 8,000–12,000 fighters.

=== In Asia ===
- Islamic State – Azerbaijan Province (IS-AP) emerged in 2019 and operates in Azerbaijan. Its adeherents were previously recruited by both the Islamic State – Caucasus Province (IS-CP) and Islamic State – Khorasan Province (ISIS-K). Its current size is unknown.
- Islamic State – Bengal Province (IS-BP) is active in Bangladesh. The group is an offshoot of the Al-Qaeda affiliated Jamaat-ul-Mujahideen Bangladesh (JMB). It emerged in 2015 and was claimed by IS in 2016. Its current size is unknown.
- Islamic State – Hind Province (ISHP) is the Indian branch of IS and operates in Indian Jammu and Kashmir. Its formation was announced in 2019. Its current size is unknown.
- Islamic State – Khorasan Province (ISIS-K) emerged in 2015 and operates in Central and South Asia, primarily Afghanistan, Pakistan, Tajikistan and Uzbekistan. As of 2025, ISIS-K is estimated to have 2,000 fighters.
- Islamic State – Pakistan Province (ISPP) was formed in 2019 as a split from Islamic State – Khorasan Province (ISIS-K). It is active in the Pakistani provinces of Punjab, Balochistan and Azad Kashmir, as well as Iran's Sistan and Baluchestan province. Its current size is unknown.
- Islamic State – Philippines Province (ISPP) operates in the Philippines, primarily in Mindanao. It emerged in 2016 from local jihadist groups Maute Group, Bangsamoro Islamic Freedom Fighters (BIFF), and Ansar Khalifa Philippines (AKP).
- Islamic State – Turkey Province (IS-TP) was formed in 2019 and is active in Turkey. It is less active than other IS affiliates. Its current size is unknown.

=== In Europe ===
- Islamic State – Caucasus Province (IS-CP) is active in the North Caucasus region of Russia. IS announced the group's formation in 2015. Its current size is unknown.

== International reaction ==
=== International criticism ===
The group has attracted widespread criticism internationally for its extremism, from governments and international bodies such as the United Nations and Amnesty International. On 24 September 2014, United Nations Secretary-General Ban Ki-moon stated: "As Muslim leaders around the world have said, groups like ISIL—or Da'ish—have nothing to do with Islam, and they certainly do not represent a state. They should more fittingly be called the 'Un-Islamic Non-State'." ISIL has been classified a terrorist organisation by the United Nations, the European Union and its member states, the United States, Russia, India, Turkey, Saudi Arabia and many other countries. Over 60 countries are directly or indirectly waging war against ISIL (see § Countries and groups at war with IS). The group was described as a cult in a Huffington Post column by notable cult authority Steven Hassan.

Twitter has removed many accounts used to spread IS propaganda, and Google developed a "Redirect Method" that identifies individuals searching for IS-related material and redirects them to content that challenges IS narratives.

=== Islamic criticism ===
The group's declaration of a caliphate has been criticised and its legitimacy has been disputed by Middle Eastern governments, by Sunni Muslim theologians and historians as well as other jihadist groups.

==== Religious leaders and organisations ====
Around the world, Islamic religious leaders have overwhelmingly condemned ISIL's ideology and actions, arguing that the group has strayed from the path of true Islam and that its actions do not reflect the religion's real teachings or virtues.

Extremism within Islam goes back to the seventh century, to the Kharijites. From their essentially political position, the Kharijites developed extreme doctrines that set them apart from both mainstream Sunni and Shia Muslims. They were particularly noted for adopting a radical approach to takfir, whereby they declared other Muslims to be unbelievers and therefore deemed worthy of death. Other scholars have also described the group not as Sunnis, but as Khawarij. Sunni critics, including Salafi and jihadist muftis such as Adnan al-Aroor and Abu Basir al-Tartusi, say that ISIL and related terrorist groups are not Sunnis, but are instead modern-day Kharijites (Muslims who have stepped outside the mainstream of Islam) serving an imperial anti-Islamic agenda.

ISIS has been excommunicated from Islam by a number of scholars. Sheikh Muhammad al-Yaqoubi enumerated in his book, Refuting ISIS, that their form of Kharijism has removed them from Islam and fighting them is a religious duty, stating: "ISIS' leaders are people of unbelief and misguidance, and Muslims should not be lured by their jihad or deceived by their propaganda, as their actions speak louder than their words." Abd al-Aziz ibn Baz, the former Grand Mufti of Saudi Arabia, also stated that Kharijites are not Muslims, saying: "the majority are of the opinion that they are disobedient and misguided innovators, though they do not deem them unbelievers. However, the correct opinion is that they are unbelievers."

In late August 2014, the Grand Mufti of Saudi Arabia, Abdul-Aziz ibn Abdullah Al ash-Sheikh, condemned ISIL and al-Qaeda saying, "Extremist and militant ideas and terrorism which spread decay on Earth, destroying human civilisation, are not in any way part of Islam, but are enemy number one of Islam, and Muslims are their first victims". In late September 2014, 126 Sunni imams and Islamic scholars—primarily Sufi—from around the Muslim world signed an open letter to the Islamic State's leader al-Baghdadi, explicitly rejecting and refuting his group's interpretations of Islamic scriptures, the Quran and hadith, which it used in order to justify its actions. "[You] have misinterpreted Islam into a religion of harshness, brutality, torture and murder ... this is a great wrong and an offence to Islam, to Muslims and to the entire world", the letter states. It rebukes the Islamic State for its killing of prisoners, describing the killings as "heinous war crimes" and its persecution of the Yazidis of Iraq as "abominable". Referring to the "self-described 'Islamic State'", the letter censures the group for carrying out killings and acts of brutality under the guise of jihad—holy struggle—saying that its "sacrifice" without legitimate cause, goals and intention "is not jihad at all, but rather, warmongering and criminality". It also accuses the group of instigating fitna—sedition—by instituting slavery under its rule in contravention of the anti-slavery consensus of the Islamic scholarly community. The group's persecution of Shia Muslims has also been condemned.

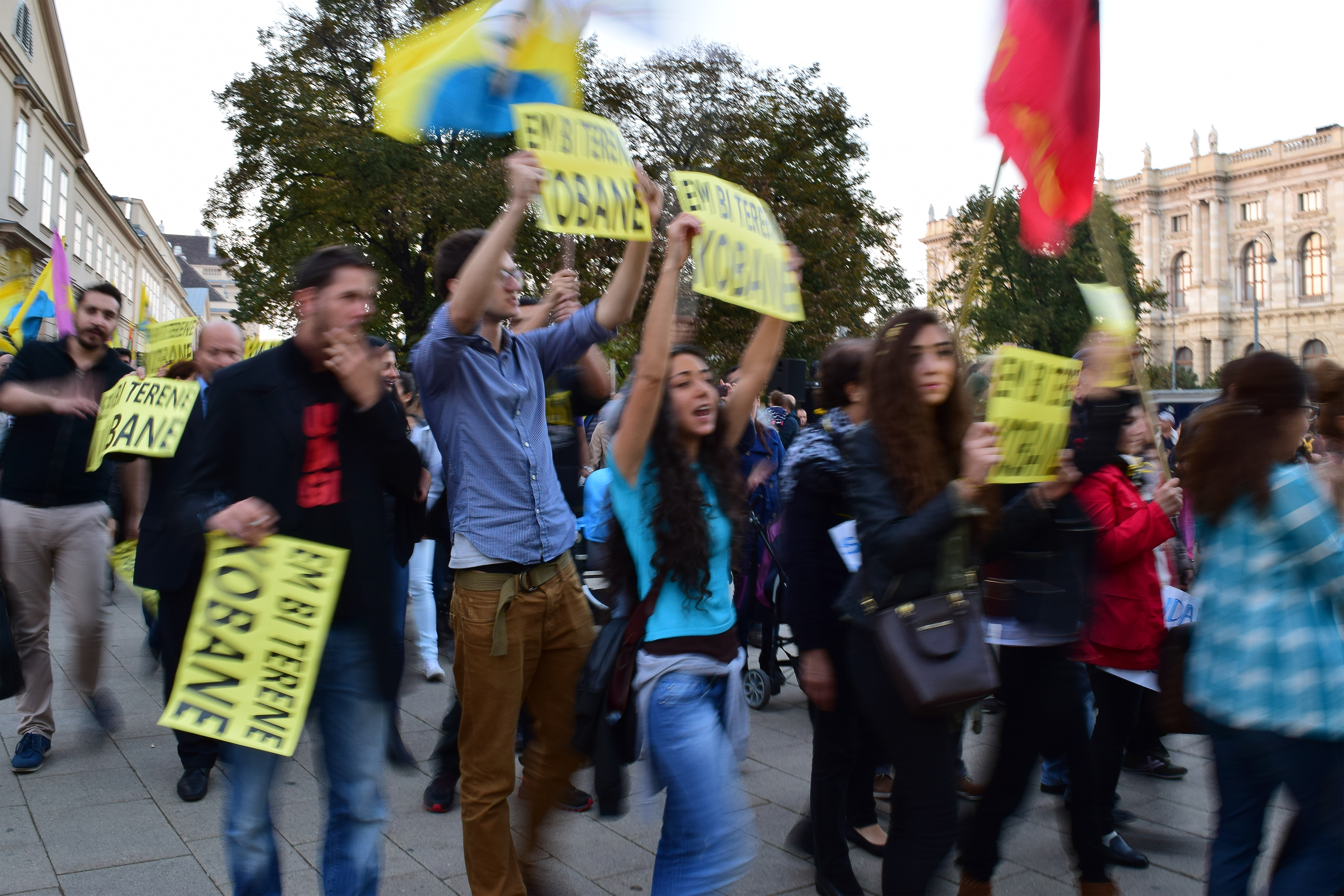
Pro-YPG demonstration against ISIL in Vienna, Austria, 10 October 2014

The current Grand Imam of al-Azhar and former president of al-Azhar University, Ahmed el-Tayeb, has strongly condemned the Islamic State, stating that it is acting "under the guise of this holy religion and have given themselves the name 'Islamic State' in an attempt to export their false Islam". Citing the Quran, he stated: "The punishment for those who wage war against God and his Prophet and who strive to sow corruption on earth is death, crucifixion, the severing of hands and feet on opposite sides or banishment from the land. This is the disgrace for them in this world and in the hereafter, they will receive grievous torment." Although el-Tayeb has been criticised for not expressly stating that the Islamic State is heretical, the Ash'ari school of Islamic theology, to which el-Tayeb belongs, does not allow calling a person who follows the shahada an apostate. El-Tayeb has strongly come out against the practice of takfirism (declaring a Muslim an apostate), which is used by the Islamic State to "judge and accuse anyone who doesn't tow their line with apostasy and outside the realm of the faith" declaring "Jihad on peaceful Muslims" using "flawed interpretations of some Qur'anic texts, the prophet's Sunna, and the Imams' views believing incorrectly, that they are leaders of Muslim armies fighting infidel peoples, in unbelieving lands".

In late December 2015, nearly 70,000 Indian Muslim clerics associated with the Indian Barelvi movement issued a fatwa condemning ISIL and similar organisations, saying they are "not Islamic organisations". Approximately 1.5 million Sunni Muslim followers of this movement have formally decried violent extremists.

Mehdi Hasan, a political journalist in the UK, said in the New Statesman

Whether Sunni or Shia, Salafi or Sufi, conservative or liberal, Muslims—and Muslim leaders—have almost unanimously condemned and denounced ISIL not merely as un-Islamic but actively anti-Islamic.

Hassan Hassan, an analyst at the Delma Institute, wrote in The Guardian that because the Islamic State "bases its teachings on religious texts that mainstream Muslim clerics do not want to deal with head on, new recruits leave the camp feeling that they have stumbled on the true message of Islam".

Theologian and Qatar-based TV broadcaster Yusuf al-Qaradawi stated: "[The] declaration issued by the Islamic State is void under sharia and has dangerous consequences for the Sunnis in Iraq and for the revolt in Syria", adding that the title of caliph can "only be given by the entire Muslim nation", not by a single group. He also stated on his official website "United Arab Emirates (UAE) and the leaders of Daesh (ISIS/ISIL) terrorist group are from one species and they are two sides of the same coin". In a similar vein, the Syrian Islamic scholar Muhammad al-Yaqoubi says, "[t]he followers of ISIS do not want to adhere to Islamic law but rather they want to twist Islamic law to conform to their fantasies. To this end, they pick and choose the evidences that corroborate their misguidance, despite being weak or abrogated."

Academics Robyn Creswell and Bernard Haykel of The New Yorker have criticised ISIL's execution of Muslims for breach of traditional sharia law while violating it simultaneously themselves (encouraging women to emigrate to its territory, travelling without a Wali—male guardian—and in violation of his wishes). as well as its love of archaic imagery (horsemen and swords) while engaging in bid'ah (religious innovation) in establishing female religious police (known as Al-Khansaa Brigade).

Two days after the beheading of Hervé Gourdel, hundreds of Muslims gathered in the Grand Mosque of Paris to show solidarity against the beheading. The protest was led by the leader of the French Council of the Muslim Faith, Dalil Boubakeur, and was joined by thousands of other Muslims around the country under the slogan "Not in my name". French president François Hollande said Gourdel's beheading was "cowardly" and "cruel", and confirmed that airstrikes would continue against ISIL in Iraq. Hollande also called for three days of national mourning, with flags flown at half-mast throughout the country and said that security would be increased throughout Paris.

==== Other jihadist groups ====
According to The New York Times, "All of the most influential jihadist theorists are criticising the Islamic State as deviant, calling its self-proclaimed caliphate null and void" and they have denounced it for its beheadings of journalists and aid workers. ISIL is widely denounced by a broad range of Islamic clerics, including Saudi and al-Qaeda-orientated clerics. Muhammad al-Yaqoubi states, "It is enough of a proof of the extreme ideology of ISIS that the top leaders of Salafi-Jihadism have disclaimed it." Other critics of ISIL's brand of Sunni Islam include Salafists who previously publicly supported jihadist groups such as al-Qaeda: for example, the Saudi government official Saleh Al-Fawzan, known for his extremist views, who claims that ISIL is a creation of "Zionists, Crusaders and Safavids", and the Jordanian-Palestinian writer Abu Muhammad al-Maqdisi, the former spiritual mentor to Abu Musab al-Zarqawi, who was released from prison in Jordan in June 2014 and accused ISIL of driving a wedge between Muslims.

An Islamic Front sharia court judge in Aleppo, Mohamed Najeeb Bannan, stated: "The legal reference is the Islamic Sharia. The cases are different, from robberies to drug use, to moral crimes. It's our duty to look at any crime that comes to us... After the regime has fallen, we believe that the Muslim majority in Syria will ask for an Islamic state. Of course, it's very important to point out that some say the Islamic Sharia will cut off people's hands and heads, but it only applies to criminals. And to start off by killing, crucifying etc. That is not correct at all." In response to being asked what the difference between the Islamic Front's and ISIL's version of sharia would be, he said, "One of their mistakes is before the regime has fallen, and before they've established what in Sharia is called Tamkeen [having a stable state], they started applying Sharia, thinking God gave them permission to control the land and establish a Caliphate. This goes against the beliefs of religious scholars around the world. This is what [IS] did wrong. This is going to cause a lot of trouble. Anyone who opposes [IS] will be considered against Sharia and will be severely punished."

Al-Qaeda and al-Nusra have been trying to take advantage of ISIL's rise, by attempting to present themselves as "moderate" compared to "extremist" ISIL, although they have the same aim of establishing sharia and a caliphate, but doing so in a more gradual manner. Al-Nusra has criticised the way in which ISIL fully and immediately institutes sharia in the areas that fall under its control, since it alienates people too much. It supports the gradual, slower approach favoured by al-Qaeda, preparing society to accept sharia and indoctrinating people through education before implementing the hudud aspects in sharia, which they believe supports punishments such as throwing homosexuals from the top of buildings, chopping limbs off, and public stoning. Al-Nusra and ISIL are both hostile towards the Druze. However, while al-Nusra has typically destroyed Druze shrines and pressured them to convert to Sunni Islam, ISIL regards the entire Druze community as a valid target for violence, as it does the Yazidis.

In February 2014, Ayman al-Zawahiri, the leader of Al-Qaeda, announced that his group Al-Qaeda had cut ties with the Islamic State of Iraq and the Levant and denounced ISIL after being unable to reconcile a conflict between them and the al-Qaeda affiliate al-Nusra Front.

In September 2015, Ayman al-Zawahiri called for consultation (shura) within the "prophetic method" to be used when establishing the caliphate, criticising al-Baghdadi for not following the required steps. Al-Zawahiri called upon ISIL members to close ranks and join al-Qaeda in fighting against Assad, the Shia, Russia, Europe, and America and to stop the infighting between jihadist groups. He called upon jihadists to establish Islamic entities in Egypt and the Levant, slowly implementing sharia before establishing a caliphate, and has called for violent assaults against America and the West.

The Jaysh al-Islam group within the Islamic Front criticised ISIL, saying: "They killed the people of Islam and leave the idol worshippers ... They use the verses talking about the disbelievers and implement it on the Muslims". The main criticism of defectors from ISIL has been that the group is fighting and killing other Sunni Muslims, as opposed to just non-Sunnis being brutalised. In one case, a supposed defector from ISIL executed two activists of a Syrian opposition group in Turkey who had sheltered them.

=== Other commentaries ===
Literature scholar Ian Almond criticised the media commentators, the lack of balance in reporting, and the "way we are learning to talk about ISIS". While there was talk about 'radical evil' and 'radical Islam', Almond found it striking because "some of the most revered and oft-quoted figures in our Western political tradition have been capable of the most vicious acts of savagery—and yet all we ever hear about is how much the Middle East has to learn from us." Almond goes on to argue that Winston Churchill "wanted to gas women and children", that Ronald Reagan's Central American policies "disembowelled more children than ISIS", that President Barack Obama's "planes and drones have dropped bombs on as many schoolchildren as ISIS", that former secretary of state Madeleine Albright commented on the deaths of Iraqi children killed by sanctions, that Henry Kissinger and Margaret Thatcher "assisted in the torture and disappearance of thousands of Chilean students and labour activists... For anyone familiar with the history of both U.S. and European torture and murder over the past 150 years, it might not be all that hyperbolic to say that in ISIS, what we see more than anything else is a more expansive, explicit version of our own cruelties. In bombing ISIS and its would-be imperialism, we are really bombing a version of ourselves."

Commentator Tom Engelhardt attributed the rise of ISIL and the destruction that followed to what he dubbed as America's drive to establish its own caliphate in the region.

A leader article in the New Scientist magazine contextualised ISIL within the nation state construct. Although the group is described as medieval in the pejorative sense, "it is also hyper-modern, interested in few of the trappings of a conventional state apart from its own brutal brand of law enforcement. In fact, it is more of a network than a nation, having made canny use of social media to exert influence far beyond its geographical base."

==== Designation as a terrorist organisation ====
Organisation	Date	Body	References
Multinational organisations
United Nations	18 October 2004 (as al-Qaeda in Iraq); 30 May 2013 (after separation from al‑Qaeda)	United Nations Security Council	
European Union	2004	EU Council (via adoption of UN al-Qaeda Sanctions List)	
Nations
United Kingdom	March 2001 (as part of al-Qaeda); 20 June 2014 (after separation from al‑Qaeda)	Home Office	
United States	17 December 2004 (as al-Qaeda in Iraq)	United States Department of State	
Australia	2 March 2005 (as al-Qaeda in Iraq); 14 December 2013 (after separation from al‑Qaeda)	Attorney-General of Australia	
Canada	20 August 2012	Parliament of Canada	
Iraq	10 October 2006 (as al-Qaeda in Iraq); 30 May 2013 (after separation from al‑Qaeda)	Ministry of Foreign Affairs	
Turkey	30 October 2013	Grand National Assembly of Turkey	
Saudi Arabia	7 March 2014	Royal decree of the King of Saudi Arabia	
Indonesia	1 August 2014	National Counter Terrorism Agency (BNPT)	
United Arab Emirates	20 August 2014	United Arab Emirates Cabinet	
Malaysia	24 September 2014	Ministry of Foreign Affairs	
Switzerland	8 October 2014	Swiss Federal Council	
Egypt	30 November 2014	The Cairo Court for Urgent Matters	
India	16 December 2014	Ministry of Home Affairs	
Russia	29 December 2014	Supreme Court of Russia	
Kyrgyzstan	25 March 2015	Kyrgyz State Committee of National Security	
Singapore	23 March 2020	Ministry of Home Affairs	
Syria			
Jordan			
Iran			
Trinidad and Tobago			
Pakistan	29 August 2015	Ministry of Interior	
Japan (Note: ISIL Tunisia, ISIL Bengal, ISIL Greater Sahara (ISGS), and ISIL East Asia (ISEA) are not considered terrorist organisations by Japan.)		Public Security Intelligence Agency	
Taiwan	26 November 2015	National Security Bureau	
China		Ministry of Public Security	
Venezuela	4 September 2019	National Assembly of Venezuela	
Philippines	3 July 2020	Via the Anti-Terrorism Act	
Azerbaijan			
Bahrain			
Kuwait			
Tajikistan			
Kazakhstan			
Afghanistan	3 July 2022 (as Khorasan Province)	Taliban	

The United Nations Security Council in its Resolution 1267 (1999) described Osama bin Laden and his al-Qaeda associates as operators of a network of terrorist training camps. The UN's Al-Qaida Sanctions Committee first listed ISIL in its Sanctions List under the name "Al-Qaida in Iraq" on 18 October 2004, as an entity/group associated with al-Qaeda. On 2 June 2014, the group was added to its listing under the name "Islamic State in Iraq and the Levant". The European Union adopted the UN Sanctions List in 2002.

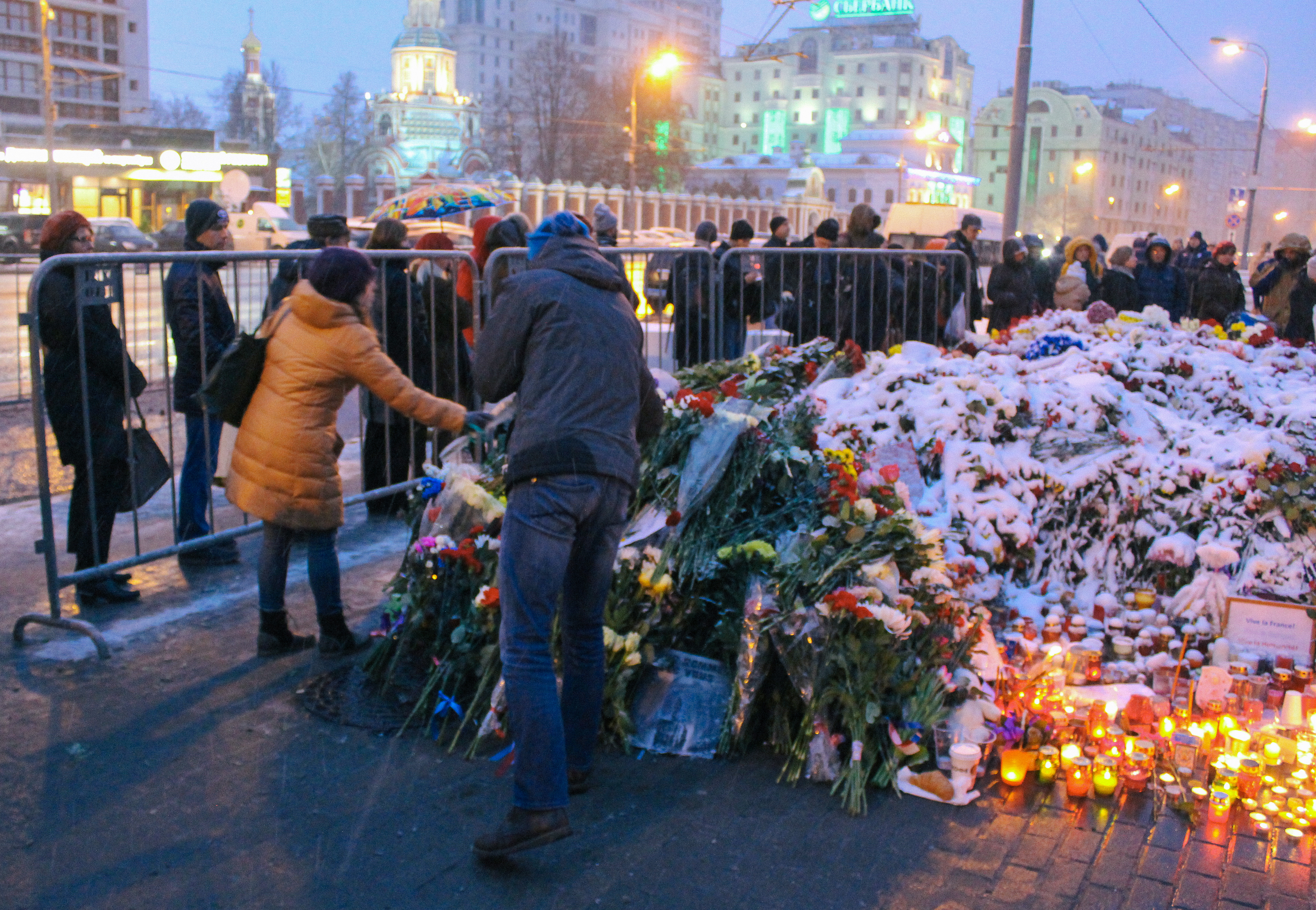
People lay flowers outside the French embassy in Moscow in memory of the victims of the November 2015 Paris attacks.

Many world leaders and government spokespeople have called ISIL a terrorist group or banned it, without their countries having formally designated it as such. The following are examples:

The Government of Germany banned ISIL in September 2014. Activities banned include donations to the group, recruiting fighters, holding ISIL meetings and distributing its propaganda, flying ISIL flags, wearing ISIL symbols and all ISIL activities. "The terror organisation Islamic State is a threat to public safety in Germany as well", said German politician Thomas de Maizière. He added, "Today's ban is directed solely against terrorists who abuse religion for their criminal goals." Being a member of ISIL is also illegal in accordance with § 129a and § 129b of the German criminal code.

In October 2014, Switzerland banned ISIL's activities in the country, including propaganda and financial support of the fighters, with prison sentences as potential penalties.

In mid-December 2014, India banned ISIL after the arrest of an operator of a pro-ISIL Twitter account.

Pakistan designated ISIL as a banned organisation in late August 2015, under which all elements expressing sympathy for the group would be blacklisted and sanctioned.

After its 2022 Ulema gathering, the Taliban banned all Afghans from associating with the local Khorasan Province branch of IS in July 2022, and labelled it a "false sect".

Media sources worldwide have described ISIL as a terrorist organisation.

Following the D-ISIS Ministerial in June 2023, Secretary Blinken announced Abdallah Makki Muslih al-Rufay'i and Abu Bakr ibn Muhammad ibn 'Ali al-Mainuki, as terrorists under Executive Order 13224.

==== Militia, cult, territorial authority, and other classifications ====
By 2014, ISIL was increasingly being viewed as a militia in addition to a terrorist group and a cult. As major Iraqi cities fell to ISIL in June 2014, Jessica Lewis, a former U.S. Army intelligence officer at the Institute for the Study of War, described ISIL at that time as

not a terrorism problem anymore, [but rather] an army on the move in Iraq and Syria, and they are taking terrain. They have shadow governments in and around Baghdad, and they have an aspirational goal to govern. I don't know whether they want to control Baghdad, or if they want to destroy the functions of the Iraqi state, but either way the outcome will be disastrous for Iraq.

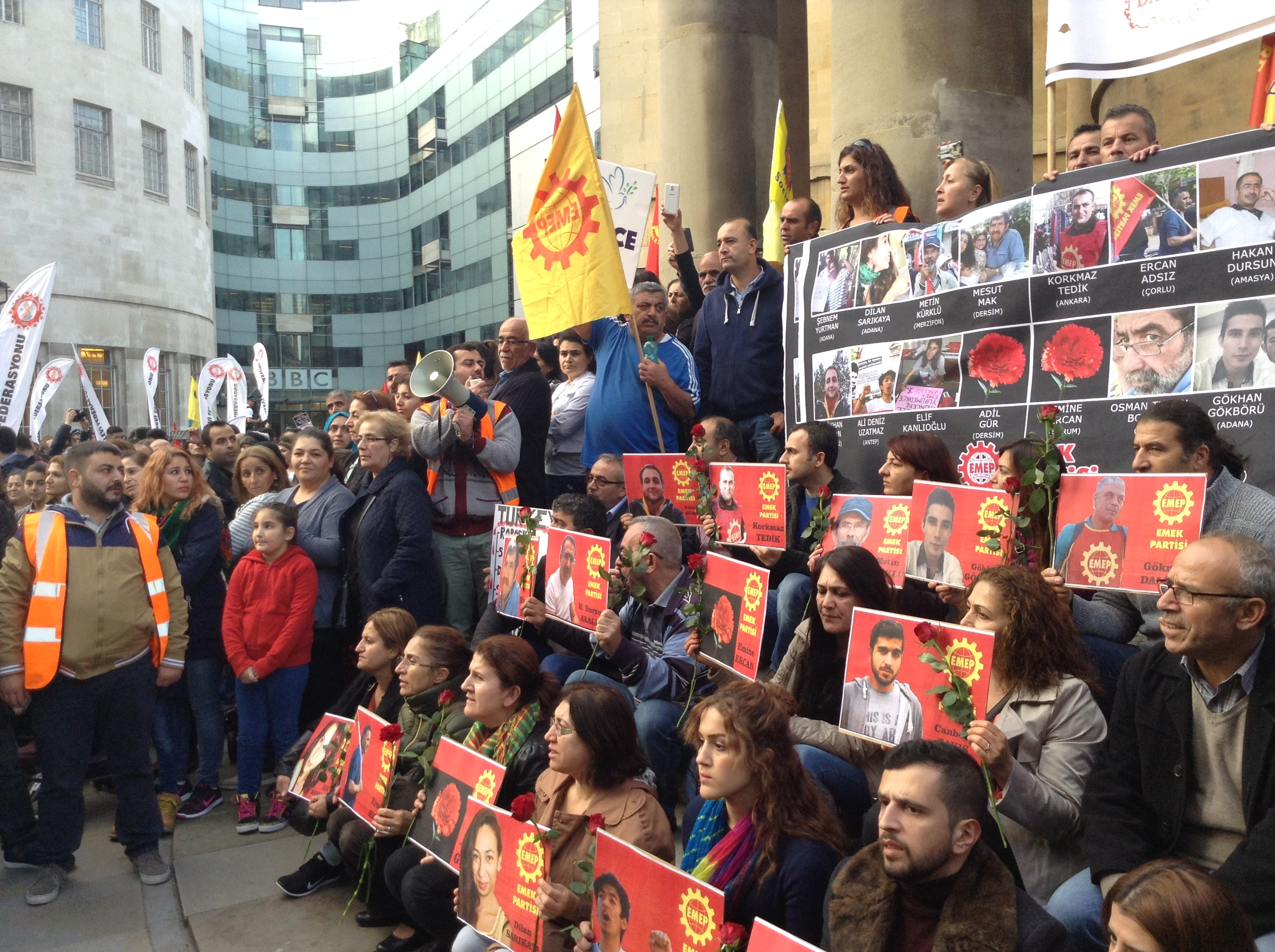
Supporters of the Turkish Labour Party protesting in London following the 2015 Ankara bombings

Lewis has called ISIL:

An advanced military leadership. They have incredible command and control and they have a sophisticated reporting mechanism from the field that can relay tactics and directives up and down the line. They are well-financed, and they have big sources of manpower, not just the foreign fighters, but also prisoner escapees.

Former U.S. Defense Secretary Chuck Hagel saw an "imminent threat to every interest we have", but former top counter-terrorism adviser Daniel Benjamin derided such talk as a "farce" that panics the public.

Writing for The Guardian, Pankaj Mishra rejects the idea that the group is a resurgence of medieval Islam, saying instead:

In actuality, ISIS is the canniest of all traders in the flourishing international economy of disaffection: the most resourceful among all those who offer the security of collective identity to isolated and fearful individuals. It promises, along with others who retail racial, national and religious supremacy, to release the anxiety and frustrations of the private life into the violence of the global.

On 28 January 2017, U.S. president Donald Trump issued a National Security Presidential Memorandum that called for a comprehensive plan to destroy ISIL to be formulated by the Defense Department within 30 days.

== Supporters ==
A United Nations report from May 2015 showed that 25,000 "foreign terrorist fighters" from 100 countries had joined "Islamist" groups, many of them working for IS or al-Qaeda.

According to a June 2015 Reuters report that cited "jihadist ideologues" as a source, 90% of IS's fighters in Iraq were Iraqi, and 70% of its fighters in Syria were Syrian. The article stated that the group had 40,000 fighters and 60,000 supporters across its two primary strongholds in Iraq and Syria. According to scholar Fawaz Gerges writing in ISIS: A History, some "30 percent of the senior figures" in IS's military command were former army and police officers from the disbanded Iraqi security forces, turned towards Sunni Islamism and drawn to IS by the U.S. de-Ba'athification policy following the U.S. invasion of Iraq.

A 2014 analysis of 2,195,000 Arabic-language social media posts cited by The Guardian had 47% of the postings from Qatar, 35% from Pakistan, 31% from Belgium and almost 24% from the UK classified as supportive of IS. According to a 2015 poll by Pew Research Center, Muslim populations of various Muslim-majority countries have overwhelmingly negative views of IS, with the highest percentage of those expressing favourable views not exceeding 14%. In most of these countries, concerns about Islamic extremism have been growing.

There is a large amount of IS supporters online (On apps such as Discord, Telegram, among several other online forums). In 2024, at least 10,000 IS fighters were still active in Syria, according to estimates by the Kurdish-led SDF. As of 2025, approximately 10,000 suspected IS fighters and their supporters were being held in Syrian detention centres, and tens of thousands of their wives and children were living in secure camps.

In January 2026, a northeastern Syria offensive conducted by the Syrian transitional government against the Kurdish-led Syrian Democratic Forces (SDF) led to a significant security vacuum, resulting in the escape and mass transfer of thousands of Islamic State detainees. Following the SDF's withdrawal from key facilities such as the al-Hawl and al-Shaddadi prisons, the U.S. military began relocating up to 9,000 detainees to Iraq to prevent a resurgence of IS, while Syrian government forces assumed control of several major detention centres, including al-Aqtan prison in Raqqa.

== Countries and groups at war with IS ==
A map of all state-based opponents of IS Combined Joint Task Force – Operation Inherent Resolve Non-CJTF State opponents Territories held by IS at its late 2015 peak

IS's claims to territory have brought it into armed conflict with many governments, militias and other armed groups. International rejection of IS as a terrorist entity and rejection of its claim to even exist have placed it in conflict with countries around the world.

=== Global Coalition to Counter the Islamic State of Iraq and the Levant ===
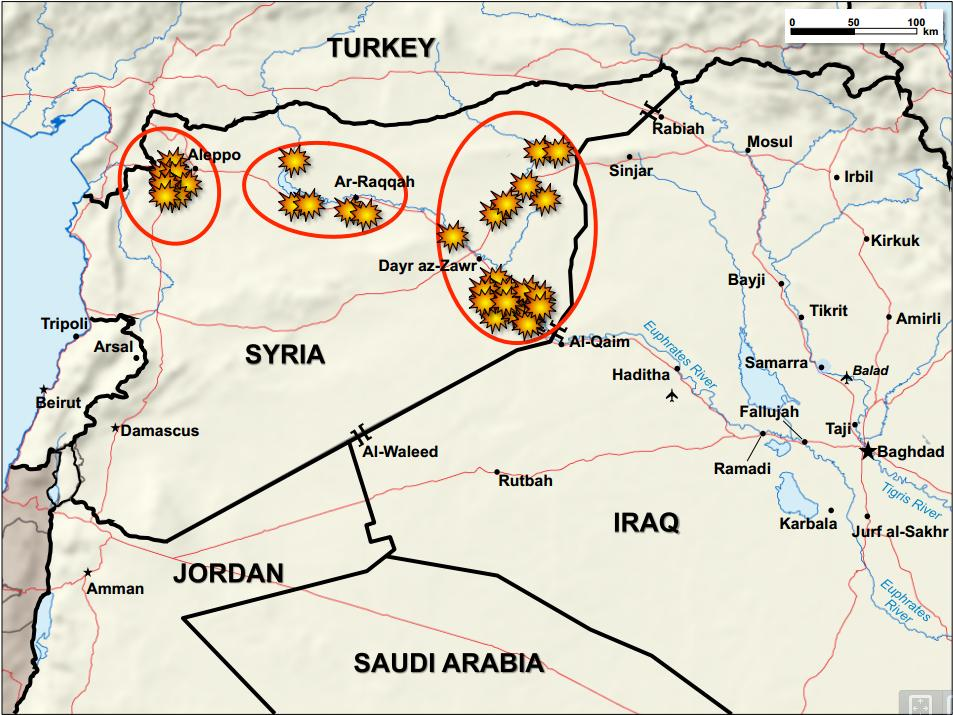
Airstrikes in Syria by 24 September 2014

US president Donald Trump announcing the death of Abu Bakr al-Baghdadi on 26 October 2019

The Global Coalition to Counter the Islamic State of Iraq and the Levant (ISIL), also referred to as the Counter-ISIL Coalition or Counter-DAESH Coalition, is a U.S.-led group of nations and non-state actors that have committed to "work together under a common, multifaceted, and long-term strategy to degrade and defeat ISIL/Daesh". According to a joint statement issued by 59 national governments and the European Union on 3 December 2014, participants in the Counter-ISIL Coalition are focused on multiple lines of effort:

1. Supporting military operations, capacity building, and training;
2. Stopping the flow of foreign terrorist fighters;
3. Cutting off ISIL/Daesh's access to financing and funding;
4. Addressing associated humanitarian relief and crises; and
5. Exposing ISIL/Daesh's true nature (ideological delegitimisation).

Operation Inherent Resolve is the operational name given by the U.S. to military operations against ISIL and Syrian al-Qaeda affiliates. Combined Joint Task Force – Operation Inherent Resolve (CJTF–OIR) is co-ordinating the military portion of the response. The Arab League, European Union, NATO, and GCC are part of the Counter-ISIL Coalition: According to the Pentagon, by December 2017 over 80,000 ISIL fighters had been killed in Iraq and Syria by CJTF-OIR airstrikes. By then the coalition had flown over 170,000 sorties, 75–80% of combat sorties were conducted by the military of the United States, with the other 20–25% by Australia, Canada, Denmark, France, Jordan, Belgium, the Netherlands, Saudi Arabia, Turkey, the United Arab Emirates, and the United Kingdom. According to the UK-based monitoring group Airwars, the air strikes and artillery of U.S.-led coalition killed as many as 6,000 civilians in Iraq and Syria by the end of 2017.

Lebanon, which the U.S. considers part of the Global Coalition, fought off several incursions by ISIL, with the largest engagements taking place from June 2014 to August 2017, when several thousand ISIL fighters invaded from Syria and occupied Lebanese territory. The U.S. and UK-backed Lebanese Army succeeded in repulsing this invasion, killing or capturing over 1,200 ISIL fighters in the process.

On 21 December 2019, over 33 Islamist militants were killed in Mali by French forces using attack helicopters, drones and ground troops, alongside the border with Mauritania, where an Al-Qaeda-linked group operates.

==== Other state opponents not part of the Counter-ISIL Coalition ====
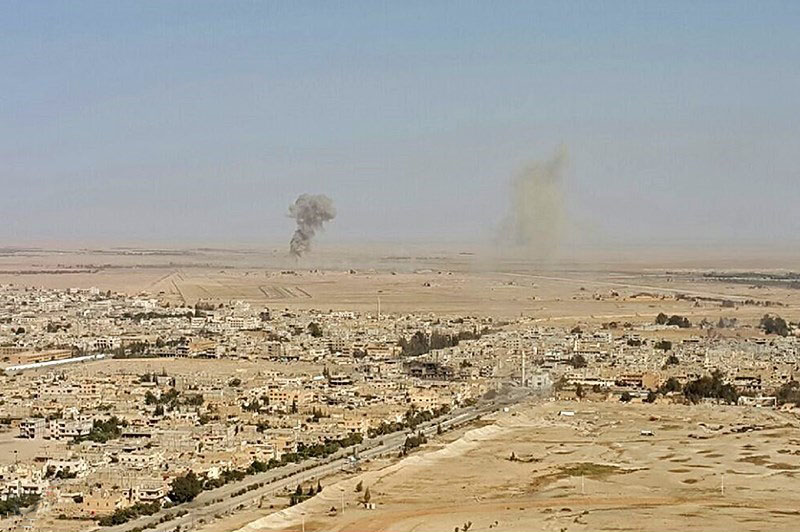
Liberation of Palmyra by the Russia–Syria–Iran–Iraq coalition in March 2016

Iran – military advisors, arms supplier, training, ground troops in Iraq and Syria, and air power in Syria, beside Iranian borders (see Iranian intervention in Iraq and Iranian intervention in the Syrian civil war)

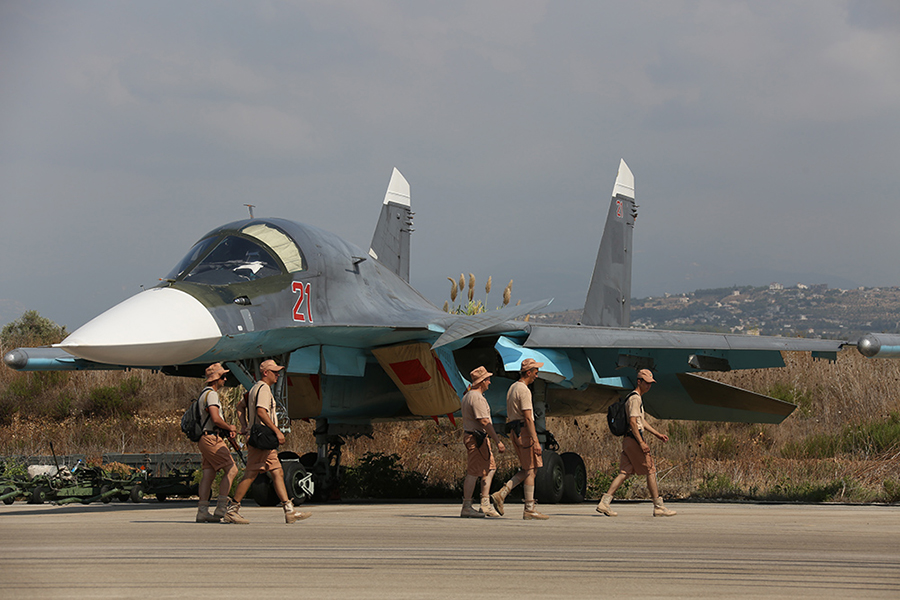
Russian Sukhoi Su-34 in Syria

Russia – arms supplier to Iraqi and Syrian governments. Security operations within state borders in 2015. Airstrikes in Syria (see Russian intervention in the Syrian civil war).

Azerbaijan – security operations within state borders

Pakistan – Military deployment over Saudi Arabia–Iraq border. Arresting ISIL figures in Pakistan and security operations within state borders (see Insurgency in Khyber Pakhtunkhwa, Insurgency in Balochistan, Islamic State – Khorasan Province, and Islamic State – Pakistan Province)

Yemen (Supreme Political Council)

Afghanistan – security operations within state borders (see Islamic State–Taliban conflict)

==== Other non-state opponents ====
- al-Qaeda
- al-Nusra Front—with localised truces and co-operation at times
- Al-Qaeda in the Arabian Peninsula
- Al-Qaeda in the Islamic Maghreb
- Al-Shabaab
- Taliban
- Hamas
- Hezbollah
- Houthis
- Kurdistan Workers' Party—ground troops in Iraqi Kurdistan and in Syrian Kurdistan
- Syrian Democratic Forces
- Nineveh Plain Protection Units – an Assyrian Christian militia in the Nineveh Plains in Northern Iraq
- Amal Movement
- Syrian Resistance – Suqur al-Furat
- Liwa al-Quds
- Liwa Abu al-Fadhal al-Abbas
- Abu al-Fadl al-Abbas Forces
- Islamic Jihad Movement in Palestine
- Arab Nationalist Guard
- Popular Front for the Liberation of Palestine – General Command
- Syrian Revolutionary Command Council
- Mujahideen Shura Council (Syria)
- Unified Military Command of Eastern Ghouta
- Fatah Halab
- Mare' Operations Room
- Golan Regiment
- Mukhtar Army

==== Al-Qaeda ====
Military situation in Syria as of February 2026: Controlled by Syrian transitional government (includes TAF) Controlled by Kurdish groups (SDF) Controlled by local Druze factions Controlled by Israeli Defense Forces Controlled by Assadist insurgents Controlled by the Islamic State (IS); (For a more detailed, interactive map, see Template:Syrian Civil War detailed map.)

Al-Nusra Front is a branch of al-Qaeda operating in Syria. Al-Nusra has launched many attacks and bombings, mostly against targets affiliated with or supportive of the Syrian government. There have been media reports that many of al-Nusra's foreign fighters have left to join al-Baghdadi's ISIL.

In February 2014, after continued tensions, al-Qaeda publicly disavowed any relations with ISIL. However, ISIL and al-Nusra Front still cooperate with each other occasionally when they fight against the Syrian government.

The two groups [ISIL and al-Nusra] share a nihilistic worldview, a loathing for modernity, and for the West. They subscribe to the same perverted interpretations of Islam. Other common traits include a penchant for suicide attacks, and sophisticated exploitation of the internet and social media. Like ISIL, several Al Qaeda franchises are interested in taking and holding territory; AQAP has been much less successful at it. The main differences between Al Qaeda and ISIL are largely political—and personal. Over the past decade, Al Qaeda has twice embraced ISIL (and its previous manifestations) as brothers-in-arms.

— Bobby Ghosh, "ISIL and Al Qaeda: Terror's frenemies", Quartz

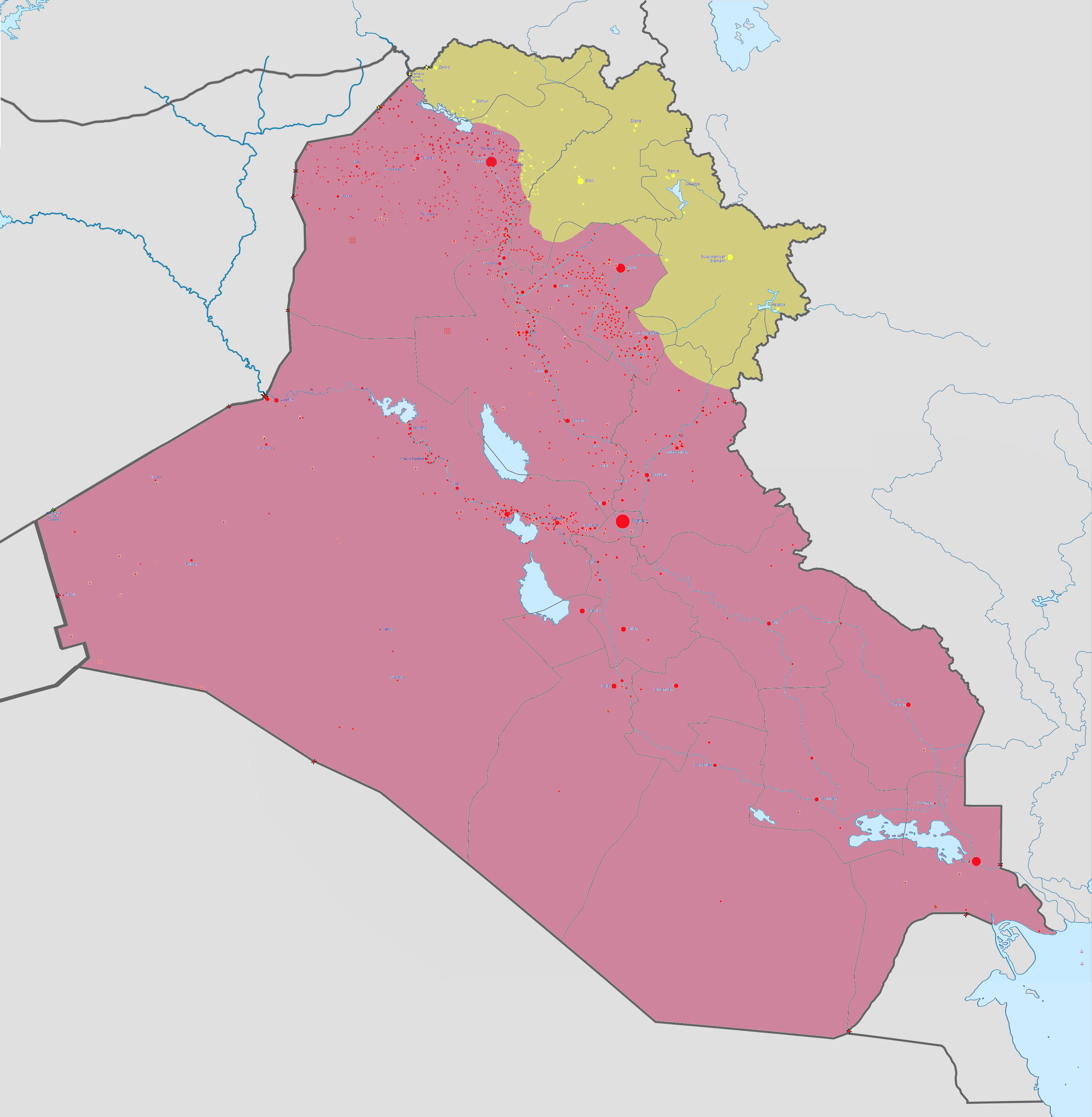
Military Situation in Iraq in May 2020

On 10 September 2015, an audio message was released by al-Qaeda's leader Ayman al-Zawahiri criticising ISIL's self-proclaimed caliphate and accusing it of "sedition". This was described by some media outlets as a "declaration of war". However, although al-Zawahiri denied ISIL's legitimacy, he suggested that there was still room for cooperation against common enemies, and said that if he were in Iraq, he would fight alongside ISIL.

== Human rights abuse and war crime findings ==
The Islamic State has committed or been widely accused of committing war crimes, crimes against humanity, and of human rights abuses, including systematic rape and other forms of sexual violence against both males and females, mass killing of prisoners of war, summary executions including the Camp Speicher massacre, public floggings, beheadings, politically motivated assassinations of judges; public officials; members of the security forces and others, and terrorising residents of Derna, Libya, among others. ISIL members were also reported to perform human sacrifices, despite the act being forbidden in Islam. Sarah Leah Watson, Director of HRW Middle East and North Africa, said: "Commanders should understand that they may face domestic or international prosecution for the grave rights abuses their forces are committing."

In July 2014, the BBC reported the United Nations' chief investigator as stating: "Fighters from the Islamic State in Iraq and the Levant (ISIL) may be added to a list of war crimes suspects in Syria."

The United Nations Commission on Human Rights has stated that the group "seeks to subjugate civilians under its control and dominate every aspect of their lives through terror, indoctrination, and the provision of services to those who obey".

According to the Iraq Body Count project, the Islamic State's fighters killed a minimum of 25,645 Iraqi civilians from 2014 to 2016.

== See also ==
- Destruction of cultural heritage by the Islamic State

== General and cited references ==
- Abass, Ademola (2014). Complete International Law: Text, Cases and Materials (2nd ed.). Oxford: Oxford University Press.
- Al-Yaqoubi, Muhammad (2015). Refuting ISIS: A Rebuttal Of Its Religious And Ideological Foundations. Sacred Knowledge. ISBN 978-1-908224-12-5.
- Boffey, Daniel. "'Islamic State' Is a Slur on Our Faith, Say Leading Muslims". The Guardian.
- Gerhard Böwering, ed. (2013). The Princeton Encyclopedia of Islamic Political Thought. Princeton University Press. ISBN 978-0-691-13484-0.
- Chulov, Martin (11 December 2014). "Isis: the inside story". The Guardian.
- "JAS vs. ISWAP: The War of the Boko Haram Splinters" (PDF). Africa Briefing (196). Brussels, Dakar: Crisis Group. 28 March 2024.
- Fishman, Brian (2008). "Using the Mistakes of al Qaeda's Franchises to Undermine Its Strategies". Annals of the American Academy of Political and Social Science. 618: 46–54. doi:10.1177/0002716208316650. JSTOR 40375774. S2CID 146236345.
- Fraile Ordonez, Siobhan (28 September 2015). "The Non-Islamic Non-State". St Andrews Foreign Affairs Review. Archived from the original on 14 February 2019.
- Morris, Andrea Michelle. "Who Becomes a Foreign Fighter? Characteristics of the Islamic State's Soldiers" Terrorism and Political Violence 35#2 (2023) pp 1–19; doi:10.1080/09546553.2022.2144730.
- Simon, Steven (2008). "The Price of the Surge: How U.S. Strategy Is Hastening Iraq's Demise". Foreign Affairs. Vol. 87, no. 3. pp. 57–72, 74–76. JSTOR 20032651.
