= Refuting ISIS =

Book by Muhammad al-Yaqoubi

Refuting ISIS: A Rebuttal Of Its Religious And Ideological Foundations
- First edition
- Author: Muhammad al-Yaqoubi
- Language: English
- Publisher: Sacred Knowledge
- Publication date: 2015

Refuting ISIS: A Rebuttal Of Its Religious And Ideological Foundations is a 2015 book by Muhammad al-Yaqoubi, a Syrian Islamic scholar and regarded among the 500 most influential Muslims, presents a response to ISIS' ideology and crimes.

== Content ==
Al-Yaqoubi argues that members of ISIS have left Sunni Islam and draws parallels with the ISIS movement and the Khawarij. He also argued that Muslims are obligated to fight ISIS, since the group had both "unlawfully" spilled blood and had ignored advice pointing out their theological errors.

=== Slavery ===
Al-Yaquobi argues that the ISIS' enslavement of non-Muslims is impermissible. This is because slavery is banned under international agreements which resemble the Prophet's own Hilf al-Fudul or "League of the Virtuous." According to Al-Yaqoubi, Muslim rulers are entitled to enter reciprocal agreements of this kind that ban slavery, and Muslims are bound by their terms. Since groups such as the Yazidis have not violated these agreements by enslaving Muslims, their enslavement is not supported by the principles of Sharia.

=== Destruction of sites ===
Al-Yaqoubi argues that ISIS's destruction of Mosques and tombs are in direct contravention of the Quranic proclamation in 2:114 "And who are more unjust than those who prevent the name of Allah from being mentioned in His Mosques and strive toward their destruction?". He refutes ISIS claims that these sites are idolatrous since erecting mausoleums for Prophets and saints is not the same as apportioning divinity to them. He also argues that the destruction of synagogues and churches falls foul of Quranic commandments.

=== Torture ===
Al-Yaqoubi condemns ISIS's treatment of prisoners as unlawful according to the Sharia. He claims that the mutilation of prisoners' bodies was ruled impermissible in a prophetic Hadith. Similarly, he argues that the torture and the killing of prisoners, the killing of innocents, and the killing of foreigners who had entered Muslim lands under the security of Muslims, are all expressly forbidden under Islamic Law.
