= Management of Savagery =

2004 book by the Islamist strategist Abu Bakr Naji

Management of Savagery: The Most Critical Stage Through Which the Islamic Nation Will Pass (Arabic: إدارة التوحش: أخطر مرحلة ستمر بها الأمة, Idārat at-Tawaḥḥuš: Akhṭar marḥalah satamurru bihā l 'ummah), also translated as Administration of Savagery, is a book by the Islamist strategist Abu Bakr Naji, published on the Internet in 2004. It aimed to provide a strategy for al-Qaeda and other extremists whereby they could create a new Islamic caliphate.

The real identity of Abu Bakr Naji is claimed by the Al Arabiya Institute for Studies to be Mohammad Hasan Khalil al-Hakim. His known works are this piece and some contributions to the al-Qaeda online magazine Sawt al-Jihad. National Public Radio has described Naji as a "top al-Qaida insider" and characterized the work as "al-Qaida's playbook".

== Etymology ==
The word in the title توحش tawaḥḥuš has been translated as "savagery" or "barbarism". As it is a form V verbal noun derived from the root وحش waḥš "wild animal", it has also accordingly been translated "beastliness".

== Themes and stages ==
Management of Savagery discusses the need to create and manage nationalist and religious resentment and violence in order to create long-term propaganda opportunities for jihadist groups. Notably, Naji discusses the value of provoking military responses from superpowers in order to recruit and train guerrilla fighters and to create martyrs. Naji suggests that a long-lasting strategy of attrition will reveal fundamental weaknesses in the ability of superpowers to defeat committed jihadists.

Naji professes to have been inspired by Ibn Taymiyya, the influential 14th-century Islamic scholar and theologian.

=== Stages ===
The Najji describes three states of jihad.

- In stage one ("vexation and empowerment") the "will of the enemy" would be broken by destruction of "vital economic and strategic targets". In Muslim-majority countries these would include "oil facilities and the tourism infrastructure". For example, after the 2005 Bali bombings of tourist resorts, tourist sites around the world were compelled to increase their security, an enormous expense compared to the small cost of jihad attacks. A campaign of constant violent attacks (vexation operations) in Muslim states will eventually exhaust their ability and will to enforce their authority. Concentrating security forces to protect these sensitive targets will cause the state to weaken and its powers wither, leading to a breakdown of public order, since "if regular armies concentrate in one place they lose control. Conversely, if they spread out, they lose effectiveness". Salafi-jihadists will take advantage of this security vacuum, launching an all-out battle on the thinly dispersed security forces leading to the destruction of the state targeted by the jihadis. Extreme violence is emphasized.
  One who previously engaged in jihad knows that it is naught but violence, crudeness, terrorism, frightening [others] and massacring—I am talking about jihad and fighting, not about Islam and one should not confuse them.
  Also part of this stage are attention grabbing operations, publicized by "a media strategy that seeks rational and sharia justification for such operations" to attract youthful recruits to jihad. To free captured jihadis, hostages should be taken and "if the demands are not met, the hostages should be liquidated in a terrifying manner, which will send fear into the hearts of the enemy and his supporters." "The most abominable of the levels of savagery" are preferable to "stability under the order of unbelief". In addition, "police forces, armies, political parties, newspapers, Islamic groups, petroleum companies, private security companies, civil institutions", should be infiltrated by jihadis. Naji nominated Jordan, Saudi Arabia, Yemen, North Africa, Nigeria and Pakistan as potential targets, due to their geography, weak military presence in remote areas, existing jihadist presence, and easy accessibility of weapons.
- In stage two is the "administration of savagery" (Idarat al-Tawhush). In the wake of the breakdown in order, the law of the jungle will prevail and survivors will "accept any organization, regardless of whether it is made up of good or evil people." Jihadists can take advantage of this savagery to win popular support, or at least acquiescence, Jihadis will be the organization—enforcing sharia and providing basic services of security, food and medicine. The areas they control will serve as bases to attack other states that have not yet been overthrown, to "plunder their money, and place them in a constant state of apprehension".
- In the third and final stage, ("empowerment", Shawkat al-Tamkeen). The area or areas they administer become the nucleus of a new caliphate. Jihadis will be empowered through the establishment of an Islamic state, ruled by a single leader who will unify diffuse and scattered groups and regions of "savagery" in a caliphate. Despite the enormous suffering and loss of life caused by the forces of jihad, those forces will (according to Najji) win hearts and minds and gain legitimacy and recognition for Islamic rule by employing a mixture of persuasion and coercion.

== In practice ==
A number of media outlets have compared the attempts by the Islamic State of Iraq and the Levant to establish territorial control in Iraq and Syria with the strategy outlined in Management of Savagery. The first issue of the Islamic State's online magazine, Dabiq, contained discussion of guerrilla warfare and tactics that closely resembled the writings and terminology used in Management of Savagery, although the book was not mentioned directly. Journalist Hassan Hassan, writing in The Guardian, reported an ISIL-affiliated cleric as saying that Management of Savagery is widely read among the group's commanders and some of its rank-and-file fighters. It was also mentioned by another member of ISIL in a list of books and ideologues that influence the group.

Al-Qaeda in the Arabian Peninsula has been described by The Jamestown Foundation as following Naji's guidelines in Yemen, while the book has been mentioned positively in interviews with members of Somalia's Al-Shabaab.

Scholars Brian A. Jackson and Bryce Loidolt argue that Management of Savagery and Mustafa Setmariam Nasar's The Global Islamic Resistance Call led al-Qaeda to innovate and shift practices.

== See also ==
- Al Qaeda Handbook
