= Islamic State – Philippines Province =

Jihadist group in the Philippines

- Leader: Unknown
- Dates active: 2016 – present
- Split from: Islamic State – East Asia Province
- Country: Philippines
- Allegiance: Islamic State
- Active regions: Sulu Archipelago, Maguindanao, Lanao del Sur, Cotabato, Malaysia, Indonesia
- Ideology: Islamic Statism
- Status: Active

The Islamic State – Philippines Province (ISPP) (Arabic: ولاية الفلبين, romanized: Wilāyat al-Filibbīn) is a branch of the Islamic State (IS) operating in the Philippines, primarily in Mindanao. It emerged from local jihadist groups that pledged allegiance to IS in April 2016.

== Background ==
The group's primary aim is to establish an Islamic State governed by Sharia law in the region, reflecting the broader ideology of Salafi-jihadism that seeks to replace secular governments with an Islamic caliphate.

== History ==
ISPP has opposed the peace process in the Bangsamoro Autonomous Region and has been involved in efforts to disrupt the region's stability through violent tactics. The group came to international attention during the 2017 Marawi Siege, when Maute Group and Abu Sayyaf fighters, led by Isnilon Hapilon, attempted to seize control of the city of Marawi, resulting in a five-month-long conflict with Philippine government forces. Despite the death of Hapilon during the siege, ISPP has continued to operate in areas such as Sulu, Basilan, and Maguindanao, engaging in attacks including kidnappings and bombings.

The group operates with a decentralized leadership structure, drawing inspiration from both the global IS network and local insurgents. Its main opponents include the Philippine Armed Forces (AFP), the Philippine National Police (PNP), and other security forces, with assistance from international partners. Although the group's territorial control has significantly reduced, ISPP remains active in the southern Philippines, funding its operations through activities such as ransom kidnappings and extortion, while continuing to recruit from local communities. While its influence has diminished over time, ISPP remains a significant actor in the ongoing conflict in the region.
