= The Myth of Delusion =

The Myth of Delusion is an al-Qaeda document released on the Internet and also distributed via a jihadi email list. This 152-page document, written in both English and Arabic, is an attempt at an analytical look at how the U.S. intelligence agencies – the CIA, NSA and FBI, as well as military and other governmental intelligence agencies – are structured and how they operate. The document examines the structure of the agencies, how operatives are recruited, the tools of the intelligence trade, "dirty" operations, international operations, a look at the September 11, 2001 attacks and the CIA's intelligence on al-Qaeda, "internal conflicts" in the intelligence agencies, and the agencies plans for confronting the jihadis.

The Myth of Delusion was written by Muhammad Khalil al-Hakaymah (a.k.a. Abu Jihad al-Masri), a member of the breakaway portion of the Egyptian Islamic Group (Gama'a al-Islamiyah).
