= Ansar al-Khilafah Brazil =

Islamic State connected terrorist cell

- Founded: 2016
- Dates active: 2016–2018
- Dissolved: 2018
- Allegiance: Islamic State
- Ideology: Jihadism; Islamic extremism
- Status: Defunct

Ansar al-Khilafah Brazil (Portuguese: Ansar al-Khilafah Brasil, Arabic: أنصار الخلافة البرازيل, romanized: Anṣār al-khilāfah al-Barāzīl, lit. 'Supporters of the Caliphate of Brazil') was a disorganized Islamic State terror cell and organization that was active in Brazil from 2016 to 2018.

== History ==
The group gained prominence in 2016 after pledging their allegiance to the Islamic State group and threatening the 2016 Olympic Summer Games in Rio de Janeiro, Brazil, they were the first jihadi cell in South America to pledge allegiance to the Islamic State. Through Telegram, the group disseminated Islamic State propaganda in Portuguese, which included 14 issues of the Islamic State online magazine, Dabiq.

In the same month of the threats, 10 members of the group were arrested in conspiracy of the threat.

In September 2016, 8 more members were arrested for their support of the Islamic State and planning on an attack against Brazil, with one of the members buying an AKM from Paraguay, 4 more were under investigation.

In 2018, the group attempted to re-establish itself as a sleeper cell, but all 11 members were arrested after WhatsApp messages between them were leaked to the Brazilian police.
