= Iraqi insurgency =

Iraqi insurgency may refer to:

- Iraqi insurgency (2003–2011), part of the Iraq War
  - Iraqi insurgency (2003–2006), 2003–2006 phase of the Iraqi insurgency
  - Iraqi civil war (2006–2008), multi-sided civil war in Iraq
- Iraqi insurgency (2011–2013), following the withdrawal of U.S. troops from Iraq
- War in Iraq (2013–2017), armed conflict between IS and Iraq
- Islamic State insurgency in Iraq (2017–present), continued IS insurgency following territorial defeat
