= Muhammad al-Yaqoubi =

Syrian Islamic scholar (born 1963)

Shaykh Muhammad al-Yaqoubi
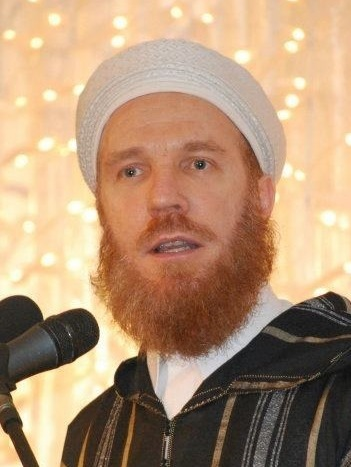

Personal life
- Born: 7 May 1963 (age 63) Damascus, Syria
- Era: Modern
- Region: Levant
- Main interest(s): Aqidah, Hadith, Tafsir, Tasawwuf, Fiqh, Usul al-fiqh, Mustalah, Nahw
- Occupation: Islamic scholar, religious leader, author, poet
- Website: www.sacredknowledge.co.uk

Religious life
- Religion: Islam
- Denomination: Sunni
- Jurisprudence: Maliki and Hanafi
- Tariqa: Shadhili
- Creed: Ash'ari
- Movement: Islamic neo-traditionalism

YouTube information
- Channel: Shaykh Muhammad Al-Yaqoubi
- Years active: 2019—present
- Subscribers: 42.3 thousand
- Views: 3.27 million
- Last updated: 10 August 2026

Muhammad Abul Huda al-Yaqoubi (Note: Arabic: محمد أبو الهدى اليعقوبي, romanized: Muḥammad Abu al-Hudā al-Yaʿqūbī) (born 7 May 1963) is a Syrian Islamic scholar. A descendant of the Islamic prophet Muhammad, al-Yaqoubi is a follower of the Maliki and Hanafi schools of thought.

He has opposed former Syrian president Bashar al-Assad and Islamic State leader Abu Bakr al-Baghdadi.

== Early life and background ==
Al-Yaqoubi was born in Damascus, Syria. His father, Ibrahim al-Yaqoubi (d. 1985) was a scholar. His paternal grandfather Ismail Al-Yaqoubi (d. 1960) was a scholar and Sufi master. His father's maternal uncle was Arabi al-Yaqoubi (d. 1965), and his paternal uncle was Sharif al-Yaqoubi (d. 1943). Amongst al-Yaqoubi's predecessors three have held the post of Maliki Imam at the Grand Umayyad Mosque of Damascus.

Al-Yaqoubi is a descendant of Muhammad, tracing his lineage through Mawlay Idris II, who was a descendant of Hasan ibn Ali, the grandson of Muhammad.

== Education ==
Al-Yaqoubi's father took care of his upbringing, and he was both his teacher and spiritual master. His father gave him several ijazah, or certificates of authority to teach, narrate and issue legal rulings under Islamic law.

Al-Yaqoubi also received training from his father in Sufism, until he attained qualification as a murshid (guide) of the Shadhili Order and the rank of a spiritual master in the Sufi tradition.

Al-Yaqoubi has also received ijazat from prominent scholars of Syria including: the Maliki Mufti of Syria, Makki al-Kittani; the Hanafi Mufti of Syria, Muhammad Abul Yusr Abidin; Ali al-Boudaylimi al-Tilimsani of Algeria, Abdul Aziz Uyun al-Sud of Homs, and Salih al-Khatib.

In 1987, al-Yaqoubi completed a degree in Arabic Literature at the University of Damascus within the Faculty of Islamic Law. He then studied philosophy for two years at the Beirut Arab University.

In 1991, he joined the PhD program of linguistics in the Oriental Studies Department of the University of Gothenburg. In Sweden, he worked as a researcher and teacher of Arabic literature. In 1999, the Swedish Islamic Society appointed him mufti of Sweden. Al-Yaqoubi is "fluent in several languages including Arabic, English, and Swedish" and sacred knowledge organisation states that he has trained several hundreds of scholars, imams and preachers

== Career ==
Al-Yaqoubi started teaching Qur'an studies and recitation at the Darwishiyya Mosque at the age of 11. He delivered his first Friday sermon at the age of 14 at al-Saadaat Mosque, was appointed as Friday Imam and speaker (Khatib) at the age of 17 and was appointed as a teacher of Islamic studies at the age of 20.

In the mid-2000s, al-Yaqoubi returned to Syria and began preaching and teaching the Islamic sciences such as Aqidah (Islamic theology), Tafsir (Qur'anic exegesis), Hadith (Prophetic tradition), Tasawwuf (Sciences of the heart), Fiqh (Islamic jurisprudence), Usul (origins and fundamentals), Mustalah (hadith terminology), and Nahw (Arabic grammar).

Al-Yaqoubi previously resided in Damascus and was a public teacher at institutions there. He taught Islamic theology at the Umayyad Mosque; and he held the position of Jumu'ah Khatib (Friday speaker) at the Jami' al-Hasan Mosque; at the Mosque of Ibn Arabi, he taught from al-Risalah of Abd al-Karīm ibn Hawāzin Qushayri and Shamaail Tirmidhi of Tirmidhi. He was a public speaker in both Arabic and English. In June 2011, al-Yaqoubi was forced into exile by the Assad government and moved to Morocco.

Al-Yaqoubi is also a prolific poet, authoring poems such as al-Buhur al-Shadhiliyya (The Shadhili Oceans) and The Moroccan Revelations.

Al-Yaqoubi is currently writing, publishing new works and continuing to teach under Sacred Knowledge, an initiative dedicated to the spreading of orthodox Islam.

== Involvement in the Syrian Civil War 2011–present ==
In April 2011, al-Yaqoubi was one of the first Sunni clerics to express his support for the Syrian uprising and condemn the Syrian government's response to peaceful demonstrations. In August 2011, the BBC reported that al-Yaqoubi had called for more international pressure on the government of Syria after Government forces renewed their crackdown on protesters. He was forced into exile in 2011.

Despite other leading scholars initially calling for minor reforms, al-Yaqoubi was early to demand the resignation of President Bashar al-Assad.

Al-Yaqoubi initially fully supported Kofi Annan's "Six-point plan" urging for "international pressure on Russia and China" to force the end of the conflict in Syria.

As the conflict has protracted, al-Yaqoubi publicly urged Jordan and Turkey to intervene militarily in Syria "to save the Syrian people", voicing frustration at the failure of the international community to intervene. In addition, he believes that any intervention will be undertaken by the United Nations, NATO, or the United States because it's "more realistic".

Al-Yaqoubi has been an active participant in the political process to form a credible political alternative to the Assad government. However, due to political intrigue, his appointment to be a full member of the Syrian National Council was blocked almost as soon as it was to be formally confirmed.

Since the start of the Syrian uprising, al-Yaqoubi has campaigned internationally to provide humanitarian aid for Syrian refugees. In December 2012, he led a convoy for the delivery of "vast quantities of food, baby food and blankets" to displaced Syrians in Turkey.

Consequently, he fled the country after the Syrian regime tried to silence him after he publicly criticised the ruling Arab Socialist Ba'ath Party, calling on the president to step down and supporting the Syrian uprising. He is currently in exile in Morocco, helping to deliver humanitarian aid, and is in regular contact with Syrian fighters who consult him on the moral and spiritual issues raised by their struggle. After his exile from Syria, he has taken part in a sustained international effort to provide aid for the Syrian people. He has publicly urged the international community to "implement help immediately" and to "lift the siege" on Syria in an interview with Sky News.

In August 2013, al-Yaqoubi said he wants the Free Syrian Army (FSA) to open a register in which fighters, civilians and administrators can be organized and given an identification number. He also thinks there should be recruitment centers in major towns and cities in the Middle East to pre-empt individual efforts, where those who want to fight can be vetted and trained under the FSA 's supervision.

In September 2014, al-Yaqoubi co-signed an open letter to Islamic State of Iraq and the Levant (ISIL) chief Abu Bakr al-Baghdadi saying "misinterpreted Islam into a religion of harshness, brutality, torture and murder" and refuting the ideological foundation of ISIS, banning Muslims from joining it and making it clear that this is non-Islamic, anti-Islam. In November 2014, he led prayers at the funeral of the American Peter Kassig. In an interview with CNN's Christiane Amanpour he condemned the killing of Kassig by ISIL and said, "We have to speak loud and very clear that Muslims and Islam have nothing to do with this... ISIS has no nationality. Its nationality is terror, savagery, and hatred." In the same month in an interview with Margaret Warner on PBS NewsHour he said of al-Baghdadi, "He's against Islam. He's non-Muslim, according to the Muslim standards, because he's allowing people to kill Muslims, referring to the Book of Allah [Quran], wrongly using religious texts. This is anti-Islamic. He's going against God. He's going against the message of Islam, Muhammad, peace be upon him. If he repents and come in a court and defend himself, he won't have any one single verse of the Quran to defend his opinion in killing innocent people." In March 2015, he said that ISIL has a sophisticated system of fallacies, and he referred to the extremists as "ignorant", "stupid" and "arrogant". In 2015, Shaykh Muhammad al-Yaqoubi refuted Ahmed al-Sharaa following his interview with Al Jazeera Media Network. However, after the ouster of al-Assad in 2024, al-Yaqoubi congratulated al-Sharaa on becoming the president of Syria in January 2025.

== Views ==
On 24 January 2010, al-Yaqoubi refuted the comments made by Mufti of Syria Ahmad Bader Hassoun on 19 January 2010 about Muhammad. Al-Ya'qoubi explained the necessity to obey the Messenger in every command including the news about the Qur'an and the names of the prophets. Al-Ya'qoubi asserted, "we know that Moses and Jesus are prophets only because our Prophet Muhammad told us so. Had he told us otherwise, we would have had to believe him...believing in Moses and Jesus does not imply the validity of Judaism and Christianity of today." He also asked Mufti Hassoun to resign his job out of embarrassment and to protect the dignity of Islam and the integrity of the Islamic scholars of Syria. The following day al-Yaqoubi was dismissed as Friday public speaker of al-Hasan Masjid in Abu Rummaneh, Damascus by the government. Six months later he was re-instated.

On 18 August 2011, al-Yaqoubi led prayers from a stage in Summerfield Park, Winson Green, Birmingham to some 20,000 people who gathered to remember three men killed while attempting to protect their neighbourhood from rioters and looters during the England riots. At the ceremony he said that "they made themselves an example of what a Muslim should be and what Islam is" and that "these three people are martyrs and the best we can do for them is to pray for them and for ourselves - to pray for our community." He asked for 18 August to be made a "day not of mourning and sadness but a day of bravery."

Al-Yaqoubi had been a critic of Mohamed Said Ramadan Al-Bouti's stance of supporting the Syrian government. However, after Al-Bouti's assassination on 21 March 2013, al-Yaqoubi claimed that Al-Bouti was a martyr and that he had been privately readying to defect from the Syrian government.

In August 2013, al-Yaqoubi said: "Animosity against a state cannot be declared by individuals or groups; no Islamic government is in a state of war with the UK; they all have diplomatic relations and therefore, any attack against UK citizens or interests would be deemed as un-Islamic and illegal in the Shari’a, regardless of whether we approve of UK policies or not, or its government".

== Awards ==
In 2012, al-Yaqoubi was listed in The 500 Most Influential Muslims by Georgetown University's Prince Alwaleed Center for Muslim–Christian Understanding and the Royal Islamic Strategic Studies Centre of Jordan as well as being listed in the honourable mentions in both 2015 and 2016

== Personal life ==
In 1985, al-Yaqoubi's father, Ibrahim al-Yaqoubi, died. In 2006, al-Yaqoubi's first wife, Farizah, died in a car accident. He has 6 children.

== Selected bibliography ==
=== Books ===
- Al-Lum’atul Mārdiniyah fī sharhil Yāsaminiyah: A study The Shimmer of Al-Māridinī in the Explanation of the Treatise by al-Yāsamīn, (Arabic), Dār Ibn ‘Ābidīn, 1985
- Al-Anwar fi Shama'il al-Nabiy al-Mukhtar, by al-Baghawi, preface and indices, Al-Maktabu publishing House
- Ahkam al-Tas'ir fil: Fiqh al-Islamic Rulings on Price-fixing in Islamic Law, Dar al-Basha'ir al-Islamiyyah, Beirut, 2000’'
- Husn al-Fahm li Mas'alati al-Qadā'i fil 'Ilm: Understanding Court procedures according to Magistrates' knowledge, Dar al-Basha'ir al-Islamiyyah, Beirut, 2000’'
- Refuting ISIS: A Rebuttal Of Its Religious And Ideological Foundations
- Refuting ISIS: A rebuttal of its religious and ideological foundations (Arabic copy)
- Foreword, Lights of Yearning: In Praise of the Most Praised ﷺ, by Walid Lounès Bouzerar, Dar al-Habib, 2015
- Al-Anwar Al-Muhammadiyyah: The Prophetic Lights
- Refuting ISIS, Second Edition, Sacred Knowledge, 2016
- Inqādh Al-Ummah إنقاذ الأمة the Arabic of Refuting ISIS, Second Edition
- The Manners Of Debate (Arabic Edition) (Arabic) Paperback – 25 April 2016’'
- Judgement of Hadith Narrators (Arabic Edition) Paperback – 26 June 2016
- In the Shade of the Levant, Arabic edition, Publisher Sacred Knowledge
- Seeking Knowledge: The Principles & Etiquette (Arabic), Sacred Knowledge 2016
- Celebrating Love and Theology: Refutation of the Mu'tazilites (Arabic Edition), Sacred Knowledge, Beirut, 2017,
- A Compendium of the Prophet Muhammad's Noble Names, Rabat, 2017’'
- Shamā´il al-Ḥabib al-Muṣṭafā شمائل الحبيب المصطفى ﷺ (The Prophet Muhammad ﷺ - His Beauty and Perfection) (Arabic), First Edition, Sacred Knowledge 2017
- Sahih al-Bukhari (Edition Facsimile Of Sultan Abdul Hamid II’s Publication of Sahih Al-Bukhari Al-Shareef), Signatora 2019
- Madhkal: The introduction to the Sahih (Arabic), Signatora 2019
- Saḥā´ib an-Nadā سحائب الندى (The Raining Clouds) (Arabic), Signatora 2019
- Shamā´il al-Ḥabib al-Muṣṭafā شمائل الحبيب المصطفى ﷺ (The Prophet Muhammad ﷺ - His Beauty and Perfection) (Arabic), Second Edition, Signatora, 2019
- Al-Futūḥāt Al-Maghribiyyah الفتوحات المغربية (The Moroccan Revelations) (Arabic), First Edition, Signatora, 2020
- The Moroccan Revelations (English), First Edition, Signatora, 2020

=== Audio CDs ===
- Invocations of the Heart (Volume 6)
- Love and Marriage
- The Book of Knowledge: Imam al-Ghazali
- Yasin: The Heart of the Qur'an
- Invocations of the Heart
- The Miracle of the Fig
- The Champion of Truth: Abu Bakr al-Siddiq
- Islam: The Religion of Love
- Light upon Light
- Dream Interpretation
- Unbroken Chain
- Ignorance the Disease of our Time
- Sacrifices in Being a Muslim (Group CD)
- The Divine Power, 2002
- The Miracles of the Prophet (PBUH)
- In the Footsteps of the Beloved
- Visiting the Messenger of Allah
- Where Then are you Going?
- Anger: The Door to all Evil
- Yearning for the Beloved
- In Need of Allah
- Remembering Allah
- The Information Age
- Islam and Democracy
- The Key to know Him is to know him
- Landmarks in the Life of the Prophet (PBUH)
- Pearls of Wisdom (with Dr. Nazeer Ahmed)
- The Perfect Mirror - Seeing the Prophet in your Dreams
- The Rightly Guided Caliphs
- Seekers of Knowledge
- The Sublime Love
