= Mohammad Hasan Khalil al-Hakim =

Purported former head of media and propaganda for al-Qaeda

Mohammad al-Hakim
- Born: 1961; Egypt
- Died: October 31, 2008 (aged 46–47); North Waziristan, Pakistan
- Cause of death: U.S. Airstrike
- Other name: Abu Jihad al-Masri
- Occupation: Propaganda Chief
- Organization(s): al-Gama'a al-Islamiyya and al-Qaeda
- Children: At least one male and two female

Mohammad Hasan Khalil al-Hakim (Arabic: محمد حسن خليل الحكيم) alias Abu Jihad al-Masri (Arabic: أبو جهاد المصري) (born 1961, died October 31, 2008) was a Radical Islamist intellectual. US authorities purported al-Hakim to operate in Iran as the head of media and propaganda for al-Qaeda, and "may also [have been] the Chief of External Operations for al Qaeda". The name Abu Jihad is an informal or assumed name meaning roughly "father of the struggle", and al-Masri simply means the Egyptian. He was killed in a US airstrike in Pakistan on October 31, 2008.

Al-Hakim was the person who appeared in an August 2006 as-Sahab (al-Qaeda) video to announce the merger of al-Qaeda with part of the Egyptian caliphist group al-Gama'a al-Islamiyya. He is identified in that video as Muhammad Khalil Hasan al-Hukaymah (Arabic: محمد خليل حسن الحكايمة) and more briefly as Muhammad Khalil al-Hukaymah (Arabic: محمد خليل الحكايمة) and as Abu Jihad al-Masri. In that video al-Hukaymah is introduced by Ayman al-Zawahiri, who is also Egyptian and who was the leader of the rival group al-Jihad al-Islami. The video claims that al-Hukaymah joined al-Gama'a al-Islamiyya in 1979 and was arrested in connection with the assassination of Egyptian president Anwar Al Sadat in 1981, and subsequently rearrested several times in various countries. Zawahiri claims in that video that Muhammad al-Islambouli (brother of assassin Khalid al-Islambouli) had joined al-Qaeda with al-Hukaymah. Other al-Qaeda propaganda claims that al-Hukaymah worked with Refai Ahmed Taha (former Gama'a leader and affiliate of al-Zawahiri), but that is uncorroborated.

Al-Hakim authored several books and short pamphlets on the topic of jihad. Myth of Delusion, an analysis of the American intelligence community, was released in August 2006. In September of the same year, a short piece entitled Towards A New Strategy in Resisting the Occupier was posted to the defunct jihadist website www.althabeton.co.nr. This essay, while supporting continued large scale operations against Americans in Iraq and Israelis in Israel, also encourages "individual jihads" involving only small groups or individuals using constant low-level violence to disrupt "occupying forces." Al-Hakim also stresses the need to consider public opinion in planning operations, discouraging beheadings or operations that can cause large scale casualties to innocent Muslims.

Al-Hakim is also claimed by Al Arabiya Institute for Studies to be Abu Bakr Naji, the author of the 2004 e-book Management of Savagery: The Most Critical Stage Through Which the Ummah Will Pass. The book was aimed to provide a strategy that al-Qaeda and other jihadists could follow to create a new Islamic caliphate.

On 1 November 2008 AFP quoted an unnamed senior Pakistani intelligence source saying that al-Hakim was killed in the previous day's drone strike on a car in North Waziristan.

== See also ==
- The Myth of Delusion
