= Al-Barakah (Islamic State administrative district) =

Self-proclaimed IS administrative division

Al-Barakah Arabic: الْبَرَكَة, romanized: al-Barakah
- Administrative district (former province)
- Flag Seal
- Proto-state: Islamic State
- Established: 2014
- Capital: Al-Shaddadah (until 2016); Hajin (by 2018)

Government
  - Wali: Abdul Nasser Qardash (2014, 2015); Abu Osama al-Iraqi † (2014–2015); Abu al-Waleed al-Sinawi † (?–2018)

Al-Barakah (Arabic: الْبَرَكَة, romanized: al-Barakah) is a Syrian administrative district of the Islamic State (IS), a Salafi jihadist militant group and unrecognised proto-state. Originally set up as Al-Barakah Province (Arabic: وِلَايَة الْبَرَكَة, romanized: Wilāyah al-Barakah) to govern IS territories in Al-Hasakah Governorate, the province shifted south after 2016 due to the territorial losses to the YPG/YPJ. Having been demoted from province to district in 2018, Al-Barakah administered a small strip of land along the Euphrates in Deir ez-Zor Governorate until the Battle of Baghuz Fawqani; since then the "territory" has turned into an insurgency.

== History ==
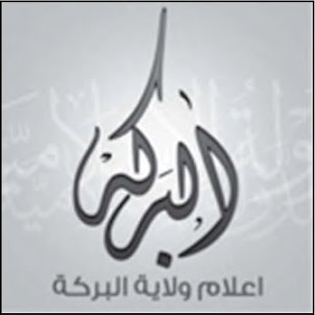
Seal of Al-Barakah during its time as self-proclaimed province

After entering the Syrian Civil War in 2013, the Islamic State started to call Al-Hasakah Governorate "al-Barakah" (translated "the blessing" or "the blessed"). Having captured vast swaths of Iraq and Syria, IS reorganized itself as proto-state in 2013/14, creating a government and 18 provinces ("wilayah") under the authority of the "Provincial Council" to administer its territories. Al-Barakah Province was founded in early 2014 to govern IS-held areas in Al-Hasakah Governorate, and essentially claimed the same boundaries as the latter. In a number of battles in course of 2014, most notably the Battle of Markada, IS defeated other rebel factions in the governorate and integrated their territories into Al-Barakah Province. The province was further expanded during the 2014 Eastern Syria offensive. Nevertheless, the province's actual control remained limited to Al-Hasakah Governorate's west and south, while the rest was held by YPG/YPJ and the Syrian Army.

After already losing much of its territory in 2015 to a number of YPG-led offensives, Al-Barakah was reduced to Al-Hasakah Governorate's frontier areas during the Al-Shaddadi offensive of early 2016. Much of Al-Barakah's regional leadership was also killed by an American airstrike in the latter offensive. By late 2017, Al-Barakah consisted just of a few villages and oil wells in Al-Hasakah Governorate's east; in response, the IS central command transferred some areas which previously belonged to "al-Furat [Euphrates] Province" (Note: This IS province straddled the Syrian-Iraqi border, and covered eastern Deir ez-Zor Governorate.) to Al-Barakah. Around November of that year, the leadership of Al-Barakah Province agreed to a month-long ceasefire with the YPG-led Syrian Democratic Forces. On 19 April 2018, much of Al-Barakah's leadership, including its governor, general Sharia official, and 30 battalion and sector commanders, were killed by a bombing during a meeting.

IS reorganized its regional affiliates in Iraq and Syria in July 2018, reducing former provinces like Al-Barakah to districts and instead referring to all of Syria as a single province. According to researchers Aaron Zelin and Devorah Margolin, this was supposed to "streamline decision-making and operations". After the launch of a SDF campaign to evict IS from its last Syrian strongholds east of the Euphrates in September 2018, IS further reorganized its territorial divisions. Al-Barakah was moved 200 kilometres (120 miles) south, into areas that were previously administrated by Al-Furat Province. This move was probably due to IS losing all remaining territory in Al-Hasakah Governorate during the early stages of the campaign. At the same time, a new "al-Hasakah" branch was set up in the areas which had originally been part of Al-Barakah Province, probably to coordinate terrorist attacks there.

The territory of Al-Barakah district came under increasing pressure during 2018, as the SDF advanced along the Euphrates. By late 2018, Al-Barakah's territory witnessed heavy fighting, and Al-Baghuz Fawqani, a village under Al-Barakah's jurisdiction, became the Islamic State's last important territorial holding in Syria by February 2019. As the SDF and IS battled for Baghuz Fawqani, Al-Barakah's media channel released a video declaring that defeat in this battle would not mean defeat in the entire campaign, and urged the IS loyalists to continue their resistance. Even as their last pocket in Al-Baghuz was reduced to a small tent city and a cave system, IS continued to keep its institutions functioning, including its bureaucracy, police, and distribution of food and monetary aid to civilian followers.

Even though Al-Barakah ceased to exist as coherent territorial entity following the Battle of Baghuz Fawqani, its forces remained active. Militants affiliated with Al-Barakah pledged allegiance to the Islamic State's new caliph Abu Ibrahim Al-Hashimi Al-Qurashi on 9 November 2019, and reportedly attacked a U.S. base in Al-Shaddadah on 26 December. The IS media office in Syria also published videos in 2019 and 2020, threatening further attacks on anti-IS forces in the former territories of Al-Barakah and Al-Khayr. In March 2025, the SDF captured Raafat Rahmoun, the Islamic State's military emir of Al-Barakah and Al-Khayr, during a raid in Al-Thawrah.

== Organization ==
=== Territory ===
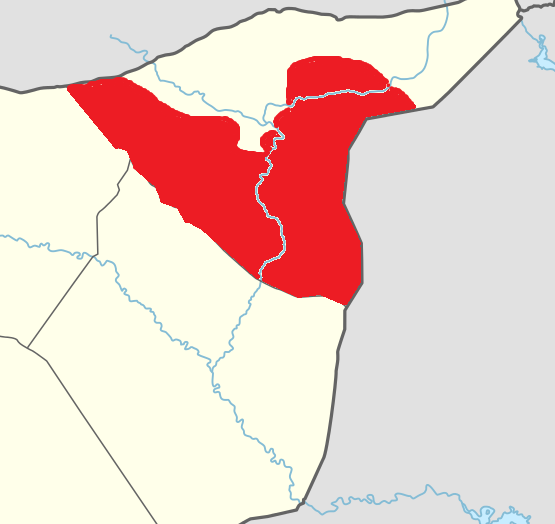
Approximate territory of al-Barakah Province in April 2015

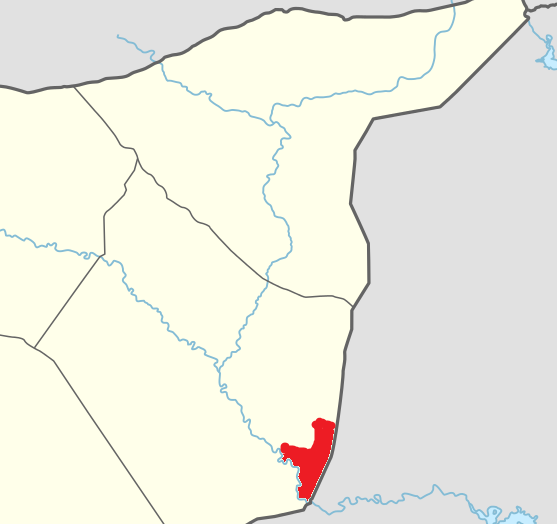
Approximate territory of al-Barakah district in November 2018

Al-Barakah Province generally claimed all of Al-Hasakah Governorate as its territory, though it never fully controlled the region. By early 2016, Al-Barakah Province's headquarters was Al-Shaddadah, while the province had been reduced to southern Al-Hasakah Governorate. Following its demotion to district and move south, the administrative division covered Hajin (Note: According to a refugee from Hajin, the town was still located in "Wilayat al-Furat" (Euphrates Province) by September 2018, although IS propaganda portrayed Hajin as part of al-Barakah by this time, and the Euphrates Province had been demoted to Euphrates district in July 2018.) and the villages of Al-Baghuz Fawqani, Al-Sayyal and Hasrat (which IS calls Al-Khayrat) and Mawzan near the Euphrates, all of them part of the Abu Kamal District. Furthermore, the village of Al-Bahra near Hajin was already part of Al-Barakah since late 2017. Al-Barakah district in its current form is bordered by Al-Furat district to its west and Al-Khayr district to its northwest.

=== Leadership ===
The province's first known governor ("wali") was Abdul Nasser Qardash in 2014. In June of that year, after the Islamic State's declaration of its caliphate, Qardash was transferred to other positions. He was succeeded by Abu Osama Al-Iraqi who held the position from 2014 to 2015, when he was killed during the Battle of Al-Hasakah city by an American airstrike. He had been a member of the Islamic State's senior leadership, and was considered to be one of the group's "military elite leaders". At some point in 2015, Qardash once gain became involved in governing Al-Barakah. Later on, Abu Al-Waleed Al-Sinawi was appointed wali of Al-Barakah. He was killed on 19 April 2018.

Raafat Rahmoun (alias "Abu Suhaib Al-Adnani" or "Abu Hussein Al-Qurashi") served as deputy wali of Al-Barakah at some point. He was later appointed military emir of Al-Barakah and Al-Khayr, organizing attacks as part of the Eastern Syria insurgency until his capture by the SDF in 2025. Another prominent member of Al-Barakah's government was the Saudi female jihadist Rima Al-Jarish, a co-founder of the Al-Khansaa Brigade who "led the media machine" of Al-Barakah from 2014 until her death in 2016 and was responsible for recruiting foreigners. Adam Al-Chechani (d. 2016) served as leading military commander in the province by 2016. Two known general Sharia officials for Al-Barakah include Sheikh Abu Raghad Al-Da'jani, and Abu Raghad Al-Da'jani (died 19 April 2018).

Furthermore, several sub-commanders and regional leaders of Al-Barakah are known:

- Abu Abeer Al-Iraqi, "deputy emir" of Al-Shaddadah until his death in 2016
- Abu Aicha Al-Jazrawi, head of the Sharia Court in Al-Shaddadah from an unknown point after May 2015 (Note: Abu Hamid was head of the Sharia Court in al-Shaddadah until 31 May 2015, so Abu Aicha al-Jazrawi was appointed sometime later.) until his death in 2016
- Abu Hamid, emir for tribal affairs and head of the Sharia Court until his death in 2015
- Awn Al-Murad Al-Tunisi ("Abu Sayyaf Al-Tunisi"), head of the Diwan Al-Rikaz (ministry for the production/acquisition and sale of oil, gas, and antiquities) in Al-Barakah and Al-Khayr Provinces until his death in a U.S. Delta Force operation in May 2016
- Faysal Ahmad Ali Al-Zahrani, the Islamic State oil and gas division official for Al-Barakah from September 2014. He still held this position by December 2015, and had by then also assumed responsibility for a VBIED production site at Al-Shaddadah.
- Abu Jihad Al-Tunisi, media official for Al-Barakah

=== Politics and governance ===
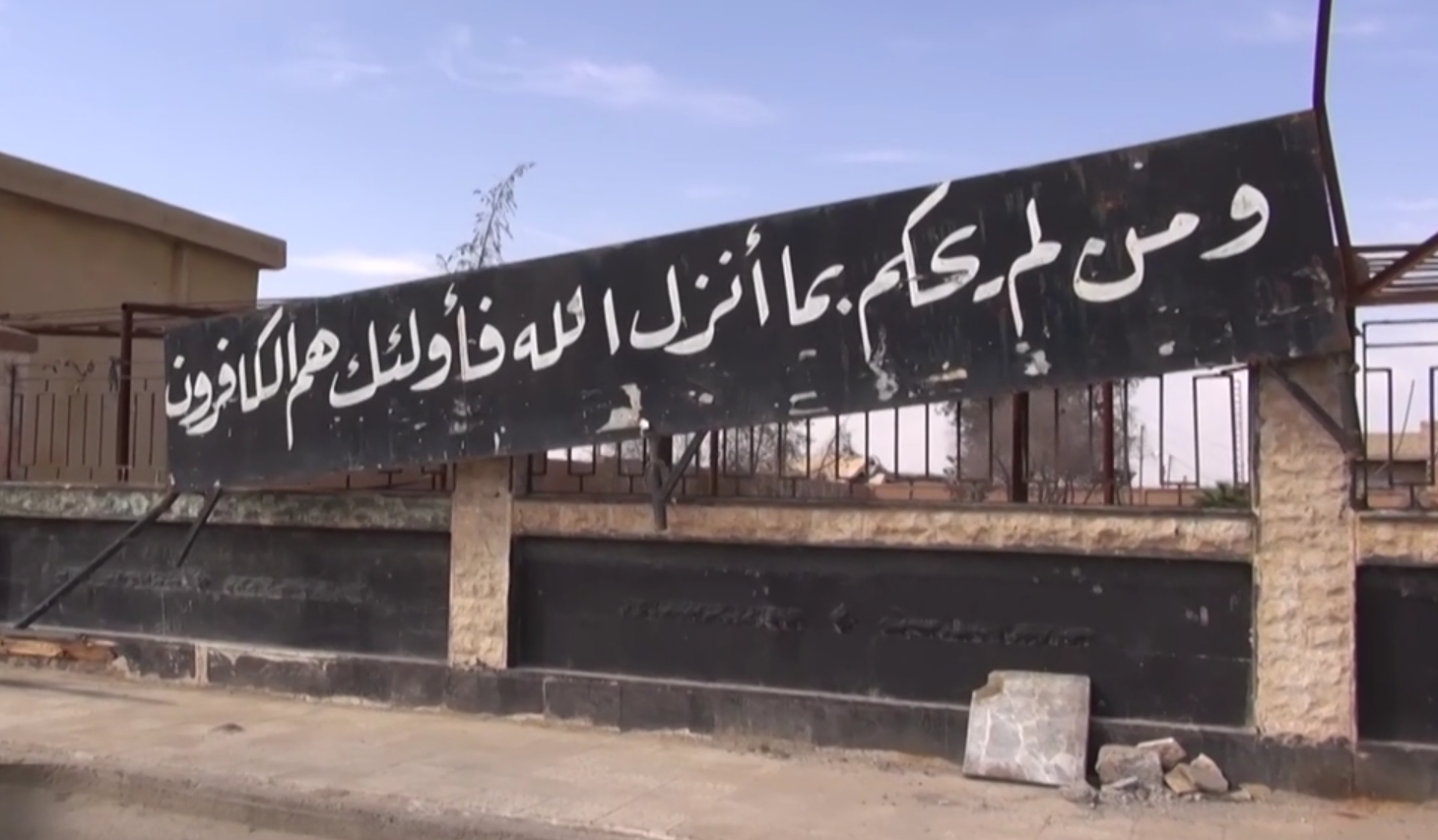
IS sign in Al-Shaddadah citing Surah Al-Ma'idah 44, "And whoever does not judge by what Allah has revealed, then those are disbelievers"; this verse was used as justification for several executions in Al-Shaddadah.

After taking control, the Islamic State started to provide public services and hired many people who had previously worked for Syrian state services. For instance, it hired "all" state-employed electricians in the area to repair power lines in Al-Barakah. In governing Al-Barakah, IS also attempted to coopt local Arab tribes and clans. In doing so, it exploited lingering anti-Kurdish sentiment among Al-Hasakah Governorate's Arab population. IS had originally "downplay[ed] accusations of anti-Kurdish racism" and presented itself as pan-Sunni organization which regarded ethnicity as unimportant. Consequently, a significant number of Kurds actually joined IS in Al-Hasakah Governorate. Over time, however, the Islamic State's relations with the Kurdish population of Syria in general worsened due to the successes of the mostly Kurdish YPG/YPJ. As many Arabs feared Kurdish expansionism, IS thus started to present itself as defender of the Arab population and employed anti-Kurdish rhetoric. This tactic had some success, even convincing former Arab critics of IS that the jihadists' rule over Al-Hasakah Governorate was preferable to the YPG/YPJ. Militant anti-Kurdish members of the Arab Tayy and Jibur tribes sided with IS in order to defend Al-Barakah Province from the YPG-led Eastern Al-Hasakah offensive of 2015.

The Islamic State's governance of Al-Barakah occasionally suffered from some internal turmoil: At some point in or after 2016, some local IS judges went on strike to protest the impunity with which IS security officials ("amnis") were allowed to act in Al-Barakah. By this point, civilians had also voiced opposition to the security agents' behavior. Regardless, higher-ranking IS officials ignored the issue. As IS control over its territories weakened, the severity of punishments increased, including in Al-Barakah. One local recalled that IS security forces initially undertook actual investigations, but later started to just execute suspects.

In early 2014, IS was preparing to set up a "dhimmi pact" to deal with Christians living in Al-Barakah Province, and ordered them to pay the jizya (a special tax for non-Muslims). At the time, the Jihadists were not yet officially forcing them to convert to Islam. Nevertheless, IS militants under Al-Barakah's jurisdiction were known to abduct, ransom, persecute, and execute local Christians, sometimes disparagingly referred to as "crusaders" by IS followers. This ran contrary to the group's own portrayal of its policies, as Al-Barakah's authorities claimed that they acted mercifully toward Christians while also proselytizing them. Most notably, Al-Barakah's media center released a report in March 2015 according to which several Christians from Tell Tamer had voluntarily converted and "received the caliphate's blessing". A local journalist argued, however, that the converts had probably been threatened with torture or death. Accordingly, the Islamic State's version of the story was propaganda "to attract the sympathy of Muslims worldwide".

After Al-Barakah had been reduced to an insurgent presence, IS continued to publish administrative documents relating to the district in order to claim a continuation of its governance.

==== Media and propaganda ====
Al-Barakah has its own media channel, simply called "Al-Barakah Province" or "Al-Sham-Al-Barakah Province". The material released by this channel is often disseminated by the Amaq News Agency and the Shumukh Agency. By 2015, Al-Barakah was among the IS provinces with the highest propaganda output. In its propaganda, IS did not just present Al-Barakah Province's governance as ideal and fair, but also promoted the beauty of its natural environment. The media output of the province was initially reduced along with its shrinking territory during 2017, but as the Euphrates holdings of IS came into focus as the Jihadist organization's last important territory in Syria, Al-Barakah regained some prominence. By 2018, the main focus of Al-Barakah's media channel was the Islamic State's resistance against the advancing SDF.

=== Military ===
Al-Barakah was part of the "Eastern Syria Command" of the military of the Islamic State by 2015. Like all IS provinces, Al-Barakah was assigned money by the Islamic State's treasury department and Delegated Committee each month based on what was available and where support was most needed. Abdul Nasser Qardash stated that his budget for Al-Barakah was $200 million in 2015. This money was spent on paying salaries of IS fighters, recruiting new troops, buying weaponry and ammunition, weapon development, and organizing military campaigns.

The number of IS fighters who served in the province varied over time. By mid-2014, the "Army of Hasakah" counted around 6,000 men; one its top commanders at the time was Abu Jandal Al-Kuwaiti. In contrast, IS was only able to gather 4,500 troops for one of its last major offensives to expand Al-Barakah in August 2015. Al-Barakah's regional military was known to include a unit of Southeast Asian child soldiers, called the "Putera Khilafa" (Princes of the Caliphate). IS also used multiple armoured fighting vehicles at the frontlines of Al-Hasakah Governorate. By 2025, armed contingents associated with Al-Barakah were mainly concerned with guerrilla warfare and terrorist attacks.
