= Abu Ibrahim al-Hashimi al-Qurashi =

Iraqi Islamic State leader (1976–2022)

Amir al-Mu'minin Abu Ibrahim al-Hashimi al-Qurashi
- أَبُو إِبْرَاهِيْم ٱلْهَاشِمِيّ ٱلْقُرَشِيّ
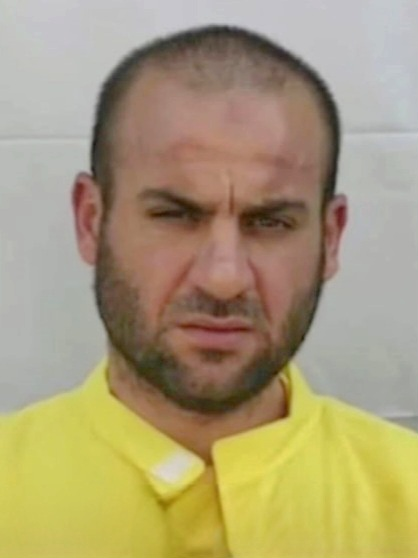
- A mugshot photo of al-Qurashi detained at Camp Bucca in Iraq

2nd Caliph of the Islamic State
- Reign; 31 October 2019 – 3 February 2022
- Preceded by: Abu Bakr al-Baghdadi
- Succeeded by: Abu al-Hasan al-Hashimi al-Qurashi

Deputy to the Islamic State's Caliph
- In office 2017 – c. 2019
- Preceded by: Abu Ali al-Anbari
- Succeeded by: Fayez al-Aqal

Emir of the Delegated Committee
- In office 2017–2019

Personal details
- Born: Amir Mohammed Abdul Rahman al-Mawli al-Salbi أمير محمد عبد الرحمن المولى الصلبي; 1 or 5 October 1976 Tal Afar or al-Muhalabiyyah, Iraq
- Died: 3 February 2022 (aged 45) Atme, Syria
- Cause of death: Suicide bombing
- Religion: Sunni Islam
- Nickname(s): "Haji Abdullah" (Note: Also transliterated as Hajji Abdallah) "Professor Ahmad" "Abdullah Qardash" "Breaker of Walls" "Bitter gourd of Infidels"
- Military career
- Allegiance: Iraq (2000–2003); Jamaat Ansar al-Sunna (2003–2007); al-Qaeda (2003–2014); Islamic State (2014–2022)
- Branch: al-Qaeda in Iraq (2004–2006); Islamic State of Iraq (2006–2013); Islamic State of Iraq and Levant (2013–2014)
- Rank: Private or officer (until 2003); Deputy leader (2014–2019); Caliph (2019–2022)
- Conflicts: War on terror; Iraq War; Battle of Tal Afar (2005); Second Iraqi civil war; Fall of Mosul; Islamic State invasion of Iraq; Battle of Zumar; Sinjar massacre; Battle of Mosul (2016–2017) (alleged); Syrian civil war; War against the Islamic State ‡‡

Abu Ibrahim al-Hashimi al-Qurashi (Note: Alternative transliterations: al-Qurayshi and al-Quraishi) (Arabic: أَبُو إِبْرَاهِيْم ٱلْهَاشِمِيّ ٱلْقُرَشِيّ, romanized: Abū Ibrāhīm al-Hāshimī al-Qurashī; born Amir Mohammed Abdul Rahman al-Mawli al-Salbi; Arabic: أَمِير مُحَمَّد عَبْد اَلرَّحْمٰن اَلمَوْلَى اَلصَّلِبؚي, romanized: Amīr Muḥammad ʿAbd al-Raḥmān al-Mawlā aṣ-Ṣalibī; 1 or 5 October 1976 – 3 February 2022) was an Iraqi militant and the second caliph (Note: The Islamic State describes itself as a caliphate and its leader as a caliph, but this is not accepted by the vast majority of Muslims, and is disputed by multiple Muslim scholars and authors.) of the Islamic State from 2019 until his death in 2022. His appointment by a shura council was announced by the Islamic State media on 31 October 2019, less than a week after the suicide of the previous caliph Abu Bakr al-Baghdadi.

Al-Qurashi's tenure as caliph saw the Islamic State being mostly limited to insurgent activity in the Middle East, but also make substantial advances in Africa, where IS increased its territories and influence. The U.S. Rewards for Justice Program was offering up to $10 million in exchange for information leading to al-Qurashi's apprehension. On 3 February 2022, al-Qurashi killed himself, and members of his family, by triggering a large bomb during a raid by the U.S. Joint Special Operations Command.

== Speculations about his identity ==
When he was announced as the successor of Abu Bakr al-Baghdadi, nothing was known about al-Qurashi other than the name he had been given by the Islamic State: Abu Ibrahim al-Hashimi al-Qurashi. His Arabic onomastic or nisbah— al-Qurashi— suggested that he, like Baghdadi, claimed a lineage to Muhammad's tribe of Quraysh, a position that offers legitimacy in some quarters. Al-Qurashi's name was believed to be a nom de guerre and his real name was unknown at the time.

The possibility that al-Qurashi was Amir Mohammed Abdul Rahman al-Mawli al-Salbi had already been raised on the day of al-Qurashi's coming to power, but this was uncertain at the time. Muhammad Ali Sajit, the brother-in-law and aide of al-Baghdadi, who was caught in June 2019, also believed that "Hajji Abdullah", a top aide to al-Baghdadi, was al-Qurashi, the new leader.

Rita Katz, director of SITE Intelligence Group, believed that it was unlikely that the Islamic State would "release any video speeches from this new leader or at least ones that show his face". Nonetheless, on 1 November 2019, then U.S. president Donald Trump stated on social media that the U.S. government had identified al-Qurashi's true identity. However, a report on 5 November 2019 by The National said that this "does not seem to be the case" and that "reports indicate that Iraqi, Kurdish and American officials say they don't have much to go on". The Intelligence and Terrorism Information Center correctly speculated on 5 November that al-Qurashi was of Iraqi nationality. The Small Wars Journal agreed with this assessment, stating that Iraqis constitute the majority of the Islamic State members and would not accept a non-Iraqi leader for the organisation.

A report on 23 December 2019 by the Voice of America expressed doubt that al-Qurashi existed at all. It stated that the Islamic State was possibly caught off guard and announced a name as a holding move, to "create the impression it is on top of things".

On 20 January 2020, The Guardian released a report confirming al-Qurashi's true identity as Amir Mohammed Abdul Rahman al-Mawli al-Salbi. On 20 May 2020, the Iraqi Intelligence Service identified a captured militant as al-Qurashi; however, the military clarified that this was actually Abdul Nasser Qardash, a potential successor to al-Baghdadi. Al-Qurashi was still outside Iraqi custody at the time.

== Biography ==
=== Early life and education ===
Al-Qurashi was born on 1 or 5 October 1976 as Amir Mohammed Abdul Rahman al-Mawli al-Salbi. Most sources—including al-Qurashi—state that he was born in al-Muhalabiyyah near Mosul, Iraq. Alternatively, Tal Afar has also been suggested as birthplace, including by a short biography published by IS supporters. His father was a muezzin with two wives; he had six brothers and nine sisters. Al-Qurashi claimed to be Arab, but many sources have claimed that his family was Turkmen. According to Nineveh genealogy expert Nizar al-Saadoun, most of al-Qurashi's clan—the al-Mawla—is Arab, and descended from the Abbasid Burisha clan which in turn were related to Muhammad's clan. The U.S. military also classified him as Arab in 2008. However, two of his brothers became leaders within Turkmen organizations. Official IS sources later described his family as being part of the Quraysh, Muhammad's tribe, albeit a "Turkified" branch. Based on a later IS biography of al-Qurashi, regional expert Aymenn Jawad Al-Tamimi argued that he was "Turkmen by language, not necessarily racial lineage". Al-Qurashi's family followed a Sufist form of Islam, and he also claimed that he was a Sufi in his early years.

He was educated in Sharia at the University of Mosul, majoring in Quranic studies and Islamic education. After graduating with honors in 2000, he was conscripted and served as a private or officer in the Iraqi Army. He likely forged contacts to jihadist groups during his military service. According to pro-IS sources, he "repented" his state service after meeting Abu Ali al-Anbari. Researcher Hassan Hassan described al-Qurashi as the "disciple" of al-Anbari, and a pro-IS biography of al-Qurashi claimed he studied "Ilm" under al-Anbari.

=== Al-Qaeda and early career with the Islamic State ===
After the end of Saddam Hussein's rule following the 2003 invasion of Iraq, he joined al-Qaeda's Iraqi branch (then known as Islamic State of Iraq, short "ISI"), and served as a religious commissary and a general Sharia jurist. Al-Qurashi's motives for joining al-Qaeda remain unclear. When he was interrogated later in life, he gave conflicting reasons, either stating that he had "joined ISI in order to stop fighters attacking innocent people" or because he had been requested to teach classes to ISI members. He climbed the group's ranks while completing his master's degree in Mosul. As part of al-Qaeda, he reportedly also served as militant for Jamaat Ansar al-Sunna under Abu Ali al-Anbari and co-founded a militant base called the "al-Jazira camp". As a local insurgent officer, he led rebel forces against the United States during the Battle of Tal Afar (2005). In 2007, al-Qurashi was appointed ISI's general religious judge and later deputy emir for Mosul. At the time, he would give lectures at the city's Furqan Mosque. Within the Iraqi al-Qaeda branch, he became part of a faction called "Qaradish", formed by followers of Abu Ali al-Anbari. This faction would later come to dominate the IS high command.

On 6 January 2008, he was arrested by U.S. forces and detained at Camp Bucca in southern Iraq. (Note: The claim that al-Qurashi first met Abu Bakr al-Baghdadi in Camp Bucca is false; the two were never detained at the camp at the same time.) While in prison, he falsely claimed to have joined al-Qaeda in 2007 and that he had served as deputy to Abu Omar al-Baghdadi. The U.S. military would later claim that he had become a willing informant during his imprisonment. A U.S. official stated: "He did a number of things to save his own neck, and he had a long record of being hostile—including during interrogation—toward foreigners in ISIS." However, the truthfulness of these claims have been doubted by analysts. Hassan Hassan argued that "well-placed Iraqi sources" described the allegations of al-Qurashi having acted as informer as being "weak" and highly unlikely, as the Islamic State usually withheld any high-ranking commands from anyone that would have become a "snitch" which was not the case for al-Qurashi. The later pro-IS biography stated that al-Qurashi was "preoccupied with lecturing" at Camp Bucca.

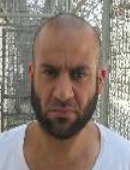
Image of Abu Ibrahim Al-Hashimi (Amir Muhammad Sa'id Abdal-Rahman al-Mawla) during his imprisonment in Camp Bucca

He was released in 2009 under unclear circumstances. Following his release, al-Qurashi rejoined al-Qaeda's ISI and began to work under Abu Bakr al-Baghdadi, the group's new regional commander for Iraq. He was appointed Sharia official for the Mosul sector and later rose to ISI judge of Wilayat Ninawa (Ninawa Province, an entity proclaimed by insurgents). Shortly before the completion of the U.S. withdrawal from Iraq in 2011, one of al-Qurashi's brothers, Amer al-Mawla, was murdered, possibly by al-Qaeda. Amer had served as the head of the Turkmen Student Union at the University of Mosul at the time. Eventually, al-Qurashi joined the Sharia Commission and began acting as Abu Ali al-Anbari's "lieutenant".

In 2013, disputes erupted between Abu Bakr al-Baghdadi's forces (by then transitioning from "ISI" to "ISIS") and the Syrian al-Nusra Front, resulting in violent clashes despite both factions being officially loyal to al-Qaeda. Amid this unrest, al-Qurashi was sent to Syria to bolster ISI's presence there and set up new local "detachments and institutes". In 2014, al-Qurashi officially left al-Qaeda, reaffirming his loyalty to the Islamic State (which had previously operated as ISI). He played a key part in the Islamic State's capture of Mosul in June 2014. In the following Northern Iraq offensive (June 2014), he led IS forces in the capture of Tal Afar and later also commanded troops in the Battle of Zumar. Along with Abu Layth Al-Ansari, he was one of the main Islamic State leaders who orchestrated the genocidal mass killings of Yazidis during the Sinjar massacre in August of that year. The Islamic State also systematically enslaved captured Yazidi women; this move was controversial within the organization, with many Iraqi commanders opposing the practice. However, al-Qurashi was one of the most important supporters of the decision to revive slavery, and was backed by non-Iraqi IS members in this regard. By this point, he had risen to deputy of Abu Bakr al-Baghdadi, and was responsible for eliminating critics of the caliph within the Islamic State. Furthermore, he became supervisor of Wilayat al-Iraq ("Iraq Province") and head of the Islamic State's treasury department after Abu 'Ala. At some point, he additionally served as justice minister for the Islamic State, and also acted as supervisor for the other ministries. His importance further increased after 2015 due to the deaths of several other leading IS commanders, leaving him as one of the organization's most important figures. A U.S. airstrike targeted him near Mosul in the same year; al-Qurashi lost his right leg in the attack.

=== Rise to power ===
When IS began to lose more and more of its territory from 2016, al-Baghdadi ordered that the Islamic State should prepare for its return to an insurgency modus operandi. Al-Qurashi was put in charge of preserving the organization's finances and ideology in the face of repeated defeats. He was based at al-Qa'im until the town was captured by Iraqi security forces in October 2017, whereupon he relocated to Syria. Despite this, the pro-IS biography also claimed that al-Qurashi took part in the concurrent Battle of Mosul (2016–2017). From 2017 to 2018, discontent grew in IS due to repeated defeats, resulting in a so-called "fitna" and the rise of "Jahmism and Irja", ideological divergences within IS. Al-Qurashi reportedly played a major role in suppressing the internal dissent and killed several IS members who had voiced misgivings over Abu Bakr al-Baghdadi's leadership. He also continued to work on reforming the internal structure of IS, restructuring the old ministries to focus solely on military activity and firing unnecessary IS officials.

Following the Battle of Baghuz Fawqani, al-Baghdadi designated al-Qurashi as his successor. According to the Islamic State, al-Qurashi was a veteran in fighting against Western nations, being a religiously educated and experienced commander. At the time, IS described him as "the scholar, the worker, the worshipper", a "prominent figure in jihad", and an "emir of war".

Less than a week after the death of Abu Bakr al-Baghdadi in October 2019, al-Qurashi was elected by a shura council as the new caliph of the Islamic State, indicating that the group still considers itself a caliphate despite having lost all of its territory in Iraq and Syria. Al-Qurashi's appointment was supposedly done in accordance with the advice of Baghdadi, meaning the new emir was named as a successor by Baghdadi himself. Further evidence that al-Qurashi may have been appointed successor by Baghdadi may be inferred from the relatively quick succession of Baghdadi. Al-Qurashi's coming to power followed several days of speculation and denial surrounding Baghdadi's death among the Islamic State supporters.

The general expectation was that al-Qurashi would become "the leader of a frayed organisation that has been reduced to scattered sleeper cells" and the ruler of a "caliphate of ashes". Some analysts believed that Baghdadi's death would likely cause the Islamic State to splinter, "leaving whoever emerges as its new leader with the task of pulling the group back together as a fighting force". However, other analysts believed that Baghdadi's death would not have much of an impact on the Islamic State "in terms of operational capacity" and that it was likely "not to result in the group's demise, or really even bring about a decline". In addition, journalist Feras Kilani pointed out that IS still commanded at least 10,000 militants in Syria and Iraq by al-Qurashi's rise to power, meaning that the "caliph without a caliphate" was far from defeated.

=== Leader of the Islamic State ===
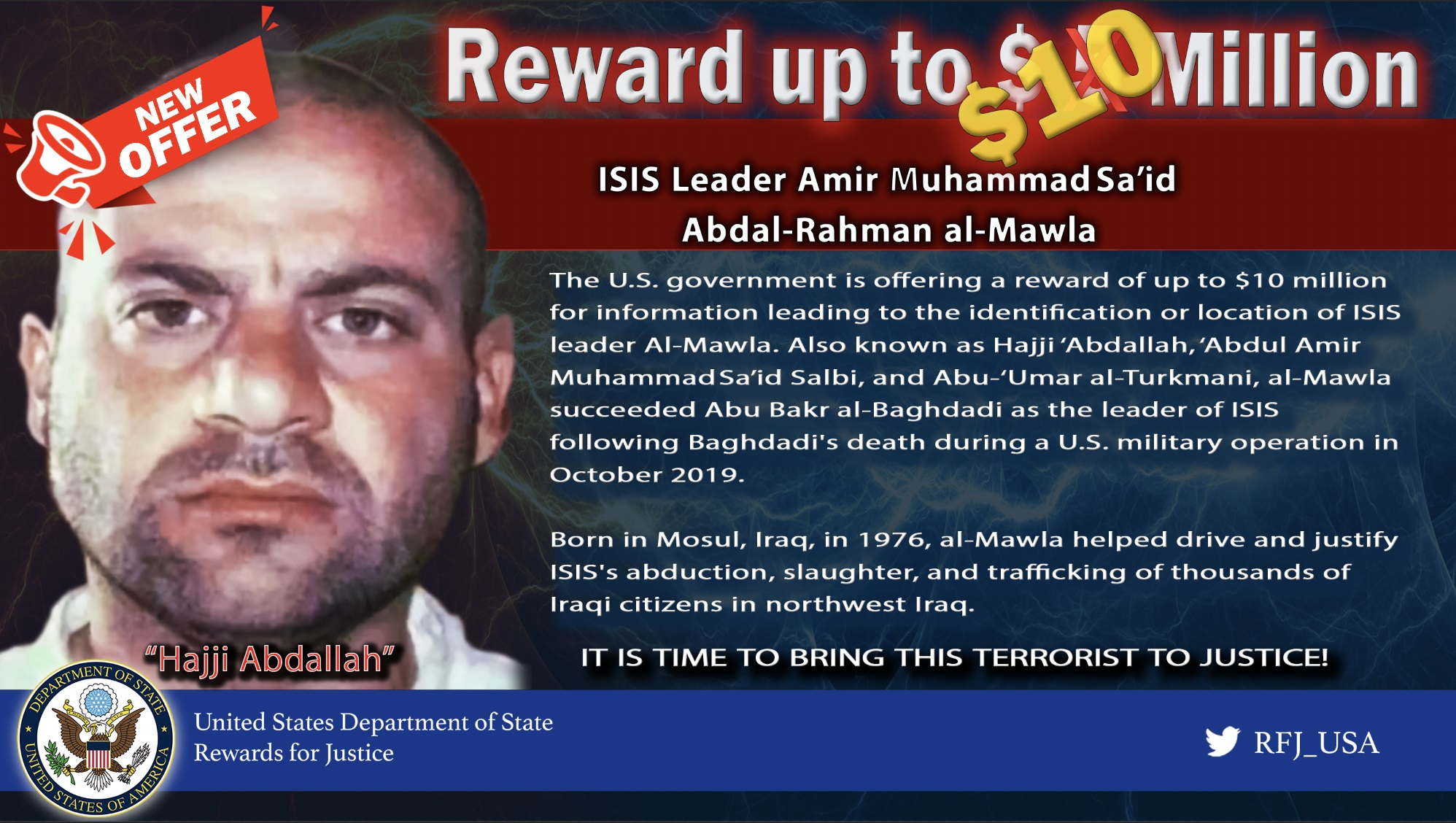
Rewards for Justice Program's bounty flyer offering 10 million dollars for information about al-Qurashi

Al-Qurashi's appointment as caliph was contentious within the Islamic State, and many IS members had misgivings about him. Some IS supporters disparagingly described him as "secluded paper caliph" and "unknown nobody". On 2–3 November 2019, al-Qurashi's caliphacy was criticised as illegitimate by the al-Wafa' Media Agency, an online media outlet previously aligned with the Islamic State before turning against it in March 2019. It was argued that "the Prophet decreed obedience to leaders who exist and who are known ... not obedience to a nonentity or an unknown". Further, it was argued that the council which elected al-Qurashi did not qualify as legitimate since it lacked three qualifications for the caliph's electors: justice, knowledge, and wisdom—which the council lacked, since it had sent Baghdadi to Idlib, which had earlier been deemed by them a "land of unbelief", when he "would have been much safer hiding in the desert". Further disqualifying the council was the fact that the council had "shed innocent Muslim blood and embraced extremism in the practice of excommunication" (takfir). As a final note, the al-Wafa' Media Agency stated that nothing was left for a would-be caliph to preside over—"You do not recognize that God has destroyed your state on account of your oppression." Such direct and open criticism was the exception, however, and al-Qurashi quickly asserted his control over the Islamic State, maintaining its cohesion. IS supporters defended the secrecy surrounding al-Qurashi as being rooted in security concerns.

In 2019, al-Qurashi received pledges of allegiance from the Islamic State's Sinai province and Bangladeshi affiliates (2 November), Somalia Province (3 November), Pakistan Province and Yemen Province (4 November), Hawran Province and Khorasan Province (5 November), Tunisia (6 November), West Africa province, Levant Province – Homs, Levant Province – al-Khayr, Levant Province – Raqqa, East Asia Province and Central Africa Province (7 November), East Asia Province (8 November), West Africa Province – Mali and Burkina Faso and Levant Province - al-Barakah (9 November), Levant Province – Halab (12 November), Iraq Province – Baghdad (14 November), Libya Province (15 November), Iraq Province – Dijlah (16 November), Iraq Province – Diyala (17 November), Iraq Province – Salah al-Din (18 November), Iraq Province – Kirkuk (19 November), East Asia Province – Indonesia (22 November), Azerbaijani affiliates (29 November), and in 2020 from the Islamic State's Malian affiliates (31 January), a new jihadist group called Katibah al-Mahdi fi Bilad al-Arakan in Myanmar (November 2020). These pledges of allegiance appeared to be intended to illustrate the legitimacy and unanimous acceptance of al-Qurashi, to counter criticism that he was unknown and illegitimate.

At the time of his appointment as IS leader, al-Qurashi was believed to covertly operate in eastern Syria, probably in territory held by the Syrian Democratic Forces. His first aim after taking control was to build up a new command structure for the Islamic State which had lost many of its high-ranking members. On 23 December 2019, Voice of America commented that al-Qurashi had "not provided visible leadership". However, al-Qurashi demonstrated his control over IS by coordinating the "Vengeance for the Two Sheikhs" campaign from late December 2019 to January 2020, an operation consisting of many terrorist attacks in several countries which were supposed to act as revenge for the deaths of al-Baghdadi and IS spokesman Abu al-Hassan al-Muhajir. The United Nations Security Council consequently judged in January 2020 that the Islamic State had undergone a resurgence in Iraq and Syria. Though these successes were partially attributed to al-Qurashi's leadership, he still remained a shadowy figure. The UN Security Council suggested that the Islamic State feared that al-Qurashi lacked some credentials that were usually necessary for a caliph, and kept him out of the spotlight so as to not endanger his position.

On 24 March 2020, the U.S. Department of State designated al-Qurashi as a Specially Designated Global Terrorist (SDGT) under Executive Order 13224. The United States also organized an extensive manhunt for him. He eventually relocated to a safehouse in Atme in northwest Syria near its border with Turkey. There, he lived mostly secluded with his wife and two children, as well as two other families. One of these belonged to a top lieutenant on whom he relied—alongside a network of couriers—to command IS forces across the world. The third family had no apparent connection to IS.

By late 2021, the Islamic State under al-Qurashi's command had greatly grown in strength in Africa. The Islamic State's West Africa Province had massively expanded its influence in the Sahel, and IS branches had opened new fronts in the Democratic Republic of the Congo and Mozambique. The pro-IS biography on his life also emphasized his alleged role in the IS expansion in East Asia and in "revitalis[ing] the centrality of Iraq and al-Sham in the war on the idolaters". In September 2021, a U.S. spy drone spotted a bearded man missing his right leg sun bathing atop a three-story building in northwest Syria, which matched the physical description of al-Quraishi. The United States consequently prepared for a commando raid.

=== Death ===
Al-Qurashi's compound

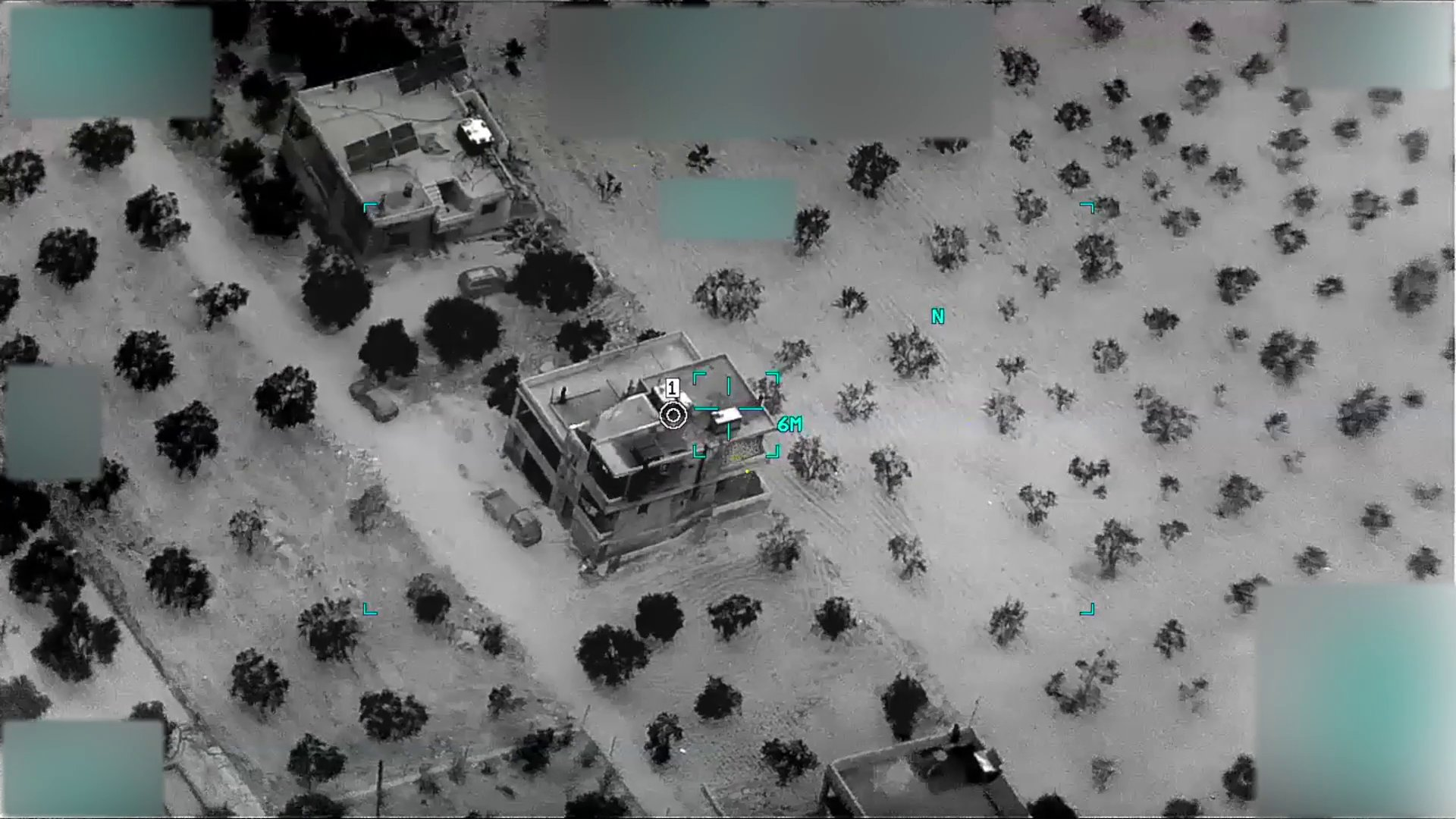
Al-Qurashi's compound prior to the operation

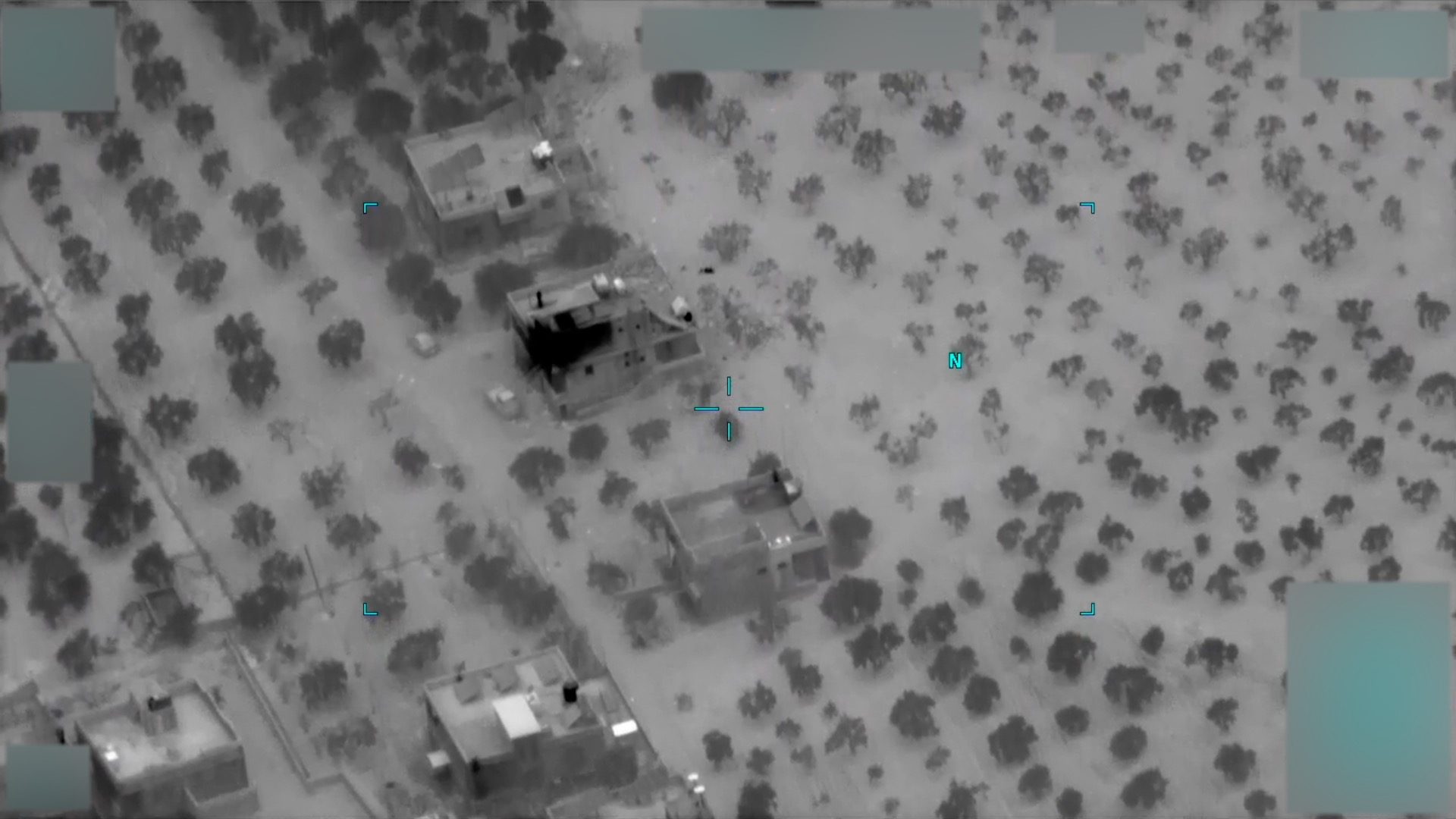
Al-Qurashi's compound after the operation

On 3 February 2022, U.S. President Joe Biden announced that U.S. military forces had successfully undertaken a counterterrorism operation in Atme, resulting in the death of Abu Ibrahim al-Hashimi al-Qurashi.

According to reports from neighbours, a loudspeaker in Arabic called for neighbouring civilians to evacuate the area, followed by U.S. forces and an Arabic interpreter on the ground making the same announcements. A senior White House official told Reuters that al-Qurashi then detonated a bomb which killed himself and 12 more people, including members of his family, during the Joint Special Operations Command operation. The explosion was so powerful that al-Qurashi's corpse was blown out of one of the windows. Following the explosion, U.S. special operations commandos entered the building and engaged in a firefight with survivors, including a lieutenant of al-Qurashi, who was also killed.

According to initial reports from the Syria Civil Defense (White Helmets), four women and six children were among the dead. Later reports from the Syria Civil Defense claimed 13 people were killed. Biden said that the civilian casualties were caused by the explosion of al-Qurashi's bomb. A fighter of Tahrir al-Sham was also killed in a brief shootout with U.S. forces after he noticed the raid taking place. There were no reported U.S. casualties, although one U.S. helicopter experienced mechanical problems and landed in a separate area, where it was destroyed by another U.S. aircraft. The survivors of the raid, including the family which was not related to IS, and the four children of the IS top lieutenant, were released by the U.S. forces. The four children were subsequently taken into the custody of Tahrir al-Sham.

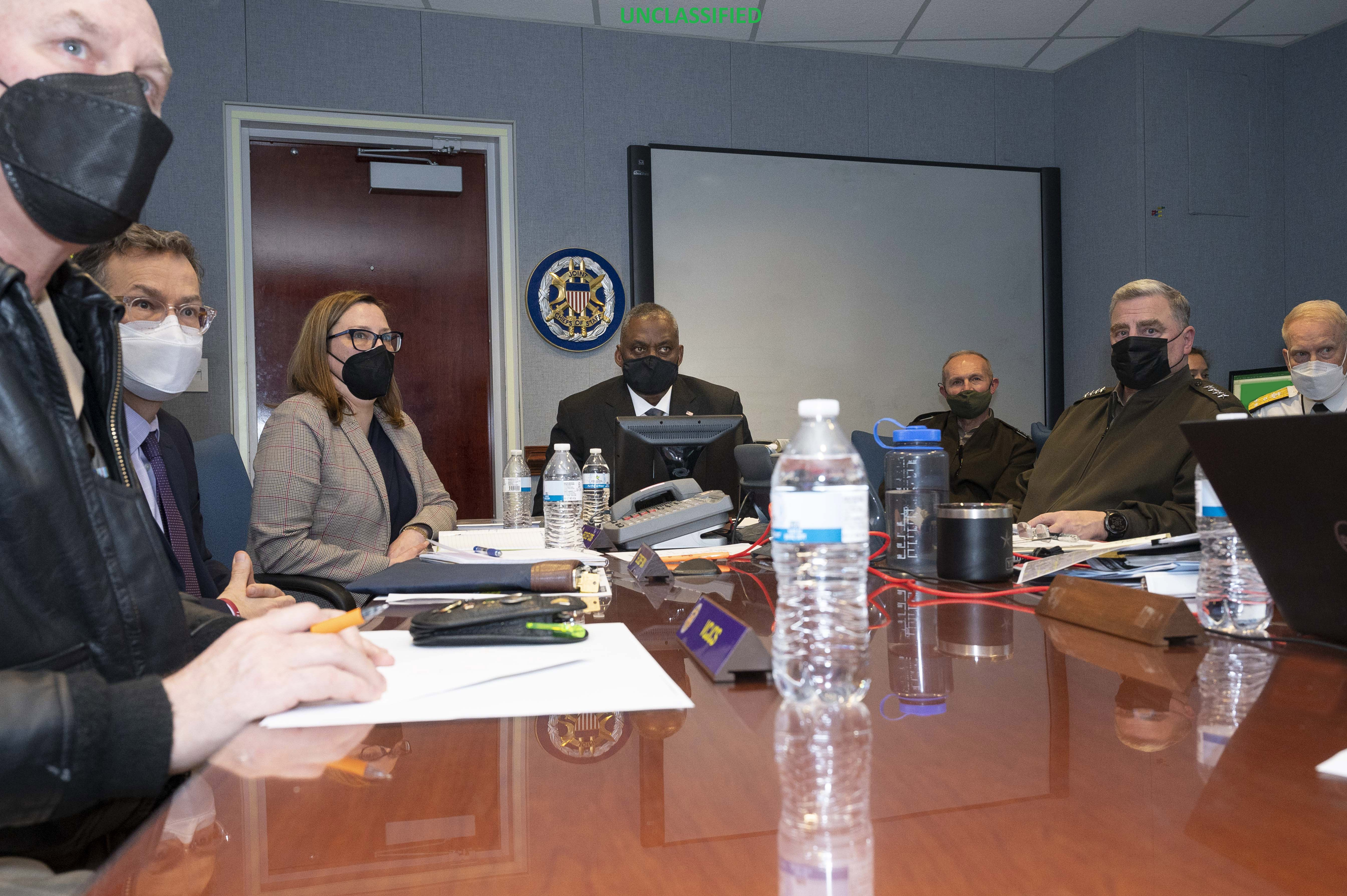
U.S. Secretary of Defense Lloyd Austin and Chairman of the Joint Chiefs of Staff Mark Milley observe from the Pentagon the raid that killed al-Qurashi.

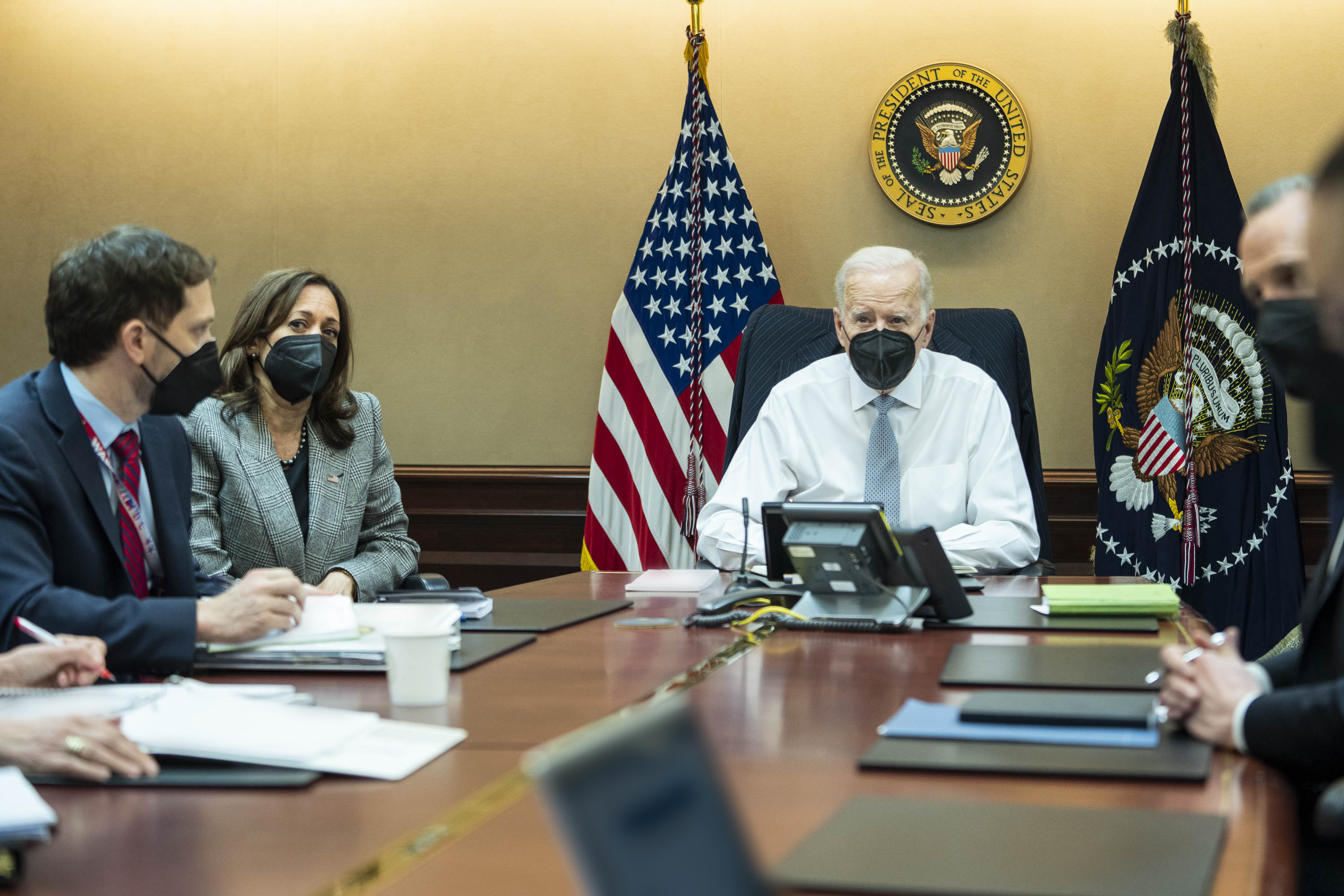
President Biden, Vice President Harris and members of the President's national security team observe the counterterrorism operation which resulted in al-Qurashi's death.

President Biden's remarks announcing al-Qurashi's death.

=== Reactions to the raid ===
The raid took place a few hundred metres away from Turkey, within a Syrian area under its influence, raising questions about the competence of Turkey in monitoring the area. A parallel was made with 2019's raid on Abu Bakr al-Baghdadi's compound, the previous IS leader, which was located 15 km (9.3 mi) south of Atime, 4 km (2.5 mi) away from Turkey, in the same area within Turkey's sphere of influence. Field surveillance in the area was handled by Tahrir al-Sham, a rigorous jihadist group and observable ally to Turkey. The area was also known to receive and host migrating families from various war-torn regions, making identification and surveillance difficult and an ideal spot for al-Qurashi and others to hide.

The Syrian Defense Forces denounced the presence of Al-Qurashi and Al-Bagdadi in Turkish-supported HTS areas as additional evidence of Turkey providing safe haven to IS forces.

The Jerusalem Post pointed out the presence of the two last IS leaders at the very border of Turkey unveils that IS does not feel threatened by Turkey, and its area of influence is perceived by IS as a safe haven for its top leadership.

The Long War Journal argued that al-Qurashi's death was unlikely to weaken the Islamic State in the long term, as his "tenure as caliph proved the Islamic State's capability to expand its influence no matter who ranks highest". A day after the killing making the front page, The New York Times also claimed that his death, while a blow to IS, does not change the long term dynamic.

The Global Network on Extremism and Technology identified 8 forms of response to al-Qurashi's death among IS supporters:

1. Denial over al-Qurashi's death
2. Warnings to fellow supporters about believing non-IS news sources
3. Information sharing and seeking about the US special forces raid such as images of the compound and maps of the surrounding area
4. Sharing and refuting a picture claimed to be al-Qurashi in death
5. Hostile remarks towards the kuffar
6. Warnings about the circulation of fake Al Furqan media foundation announcements
7. Hypothetical acceptance of the news
8. Thoughts and quotes on martyrdom

In May 2022, IS's West Africa Province said that it had killed 20 Nigerian Christian men in Borno State in a mass execution as a retaliation for al-Qurashi's assassination.

In 2023, one year after his death, a brief biography of Abu Ibrahim Al-Hashimi emerged online in prominent Islamic State supporter circles.

=== Succession ===
IS did not issue a statement regarding al-Qurashi for several weeks after his death. On 14 February, The Global Network on Extremism and Technology speculated that the group was "biding its time to carefully craft a response that will maintain some semblance of authority". A report on 2 March by the Al-Azhar Observatory for Combating Terrorism stated that internal divisions within IS, as well as a state of confusion, were stalling the appointment of a successor to al-Qurashi.

An article from Deutsche Welle stated that Abu Ibrahim al-Hashimi al-Qurayshi would be difficult to replace, as many potential leaders had died in the years preceding Al-Qurashi's death. It was suggested that the next IS leader would be Iraqi, because "in the past three years IS has become a strong Iraqi organization again".

On 9 February, Egyptian newspaper Al-Watan identified the following individuals as likely candidates:

- Mu'tazz Nu'man Abdul-Nayef al-Jabbouri
- Ziad Jawhar Abdullah
- Bashar Khattab Ghazal al-Samidi
- Abu Hamzah al-Qurashi al-Muhajir
- Nayif Hamad Shayya'

On 2 March, The Al-Azhar Observatory for Combating Terrorism provided a different list of likely candidates:

- Jomaa al-Badri
  - Nine days later, the real name of the eventual successor to al-Qurashi was stated to be Juma Awad al-Badri on 11 March, by two unnamed Iraqi security officials.
- Abu Safa al-Rifai
- Abu Loqman
- Abu Mohammed al-Shimali

On 10 March 2022, IS confirmed the death of Abu Ibrahim al-Hashimi al-Qurashi and declared that Abu al-Hasan al-Hashimi al-Qurashi had assumed the position of caliph.

In a later statement, IS clarified that Abu al-Hasan al-Hashimi al-Qurashi had already been appointed as successor the day after Abu Ibrahim's death, and that the announcement had only been delayed due to the field situation.

== Notes ==
Sunni Islam titles
Preceded by Abu Bakr al-Baghdadi	2nd Caliph of the Islamic State; 2019–2022	Succeeded by Abu al-Hasan al-Hashimi al-Qurashi
