= Abdul Nasser Qardash =

Iraqi terrorist leader (born 1967)

Abdul Nasser Qardash عبد الناصر قرداش

Deputy to the Islamic State of Iraq and the Levant's Caliph
- In office 2016 – c. 2019
- Preceded by: Abu Ali al-Anbari
- Succeeded by: unknown

Emir of the Delegated Committee
- In office 2016–2020

Deputy emir of the Delegated Committee
- In office 2014–2016

Governor of al-Barakah
- In office 2014 – c. 2015

Personal details
- Born: Tahah Abdel Rahim Abdallah Bakr al-Ghassani; 1967 (age 58–59) Tal Afar, Iraq
- Religion: Sunni Islam

Military service
- Allegiance: Ba'athist Iraq (prior to 2003); Islamic State of Iraq and the Levant
- Branch/service: Military of ISIL
- Years of service: 2003–2020
- Commands: Wilayat al-Sham
- Battles/wars: Iraq War; Iraqi insurgency (2011–2013); Syrian Civil War; Iraqi Civil War; Iraqi insurgency (2017–present)

Abdul Nasser Qardash (Arabic: عبد الناصر قرداش; born 1967; sometimes identified as Abdel Nasser Qirdash or Kardesh, also known as Hajji Abdullah al-Turkmani) is an Iraqi militant who in 2019 was wrongly reported as the leader of the Islamic State of Iraq and the Levant (ISIL). He was also nicknamed "The Professor" and "Destroyer". Qardash was a high-ranking and very influential member of ISIL with close connections to its first caliph, Abu Bakr al-Baghdadi, and tipped as a potential candidate for ISIL leadership succession. However days after the death of al-Baghdadi, Abu Ibrahim al-Hashimi al-Qurashi was ultimately chosen as the new declared leader of ISIL. Qardash was captured by Iraqi security forces in 2020.

== Early life ==
Born as "Tahah Abdel Rahim Abdallah Bakr al-Ghassani" in the mainly Iraqi Turkmen city of Tal Afar, Iraq, in 1967, Qardash is an ethnic Turkmen. He studied in the Islamic Sciences college in the nearby city of Mosul. He lived in Mosul's Musharafah neighborhood during his early years. Qardash was a Major General within the army of Saddam Hussein, but became part of the Ansar al-Islam rebel group in 2003. Qardash was jailed in 2003–2004 or 2005 by the US authorities with al-Baghdadi in Camp Bucca, a detention facility in Basra, following the invasion of Iraq and the ousting of Saddam Hussein's regime.

== ISI ==
Qardash joined the Islamic State of Iraq in 2007. He became a religious commissar in ISI in Nineveh, later in al-Jazira, and in early 2008 became ISI's "wali" of al-Jazira. He organized a number of military operations against Iraqi forces on behalf of ISI. In early 2010, he became assistant and consequently, with the approval of Abu Omar al-Baghdadi "wali" of the northern provinces including Mosul, South Mosul, al-Jazira and Kirkuk.

== ISIL ==
At the end of 2011, Qardash met Abu Bakr al-Baghdadi who appointed him as governor of the Baghdad province serving in the Baghdad region. He was trusted with the industry and development portfolios for ISIL. He reportedly played a major part in convincing al-Baghdadi to branch out into Syria during the early Syrian civil war. Qardash consequently moved to Syria to establish firearm and explosive factories and storage facilities, and met Al-Baghdadi almost a hundred times for coordination of ISIL operations. After the rift between ISIL and Al Nusra Front, he was assigned governor "wali" of al-Sharqiyyah including Syrian Al-Hasaka, Deir ez-Zor and Raqqa. In early 2014, he was appointed wali of ISIL's al-Barakah province.

After the declaration of ISIL's caliphate, he rose further in the ranks. He was appointed deputy emir of the Delegated Committee. He served as assistant to Abu Mohammad al-Adnani. After the latter's death on 30 August 2016, Qardash was appointed emir of the Delegated Committee after al-Adnani and deputy leader to Caliph al-Baghdadi . At some point, he questioned al-Baghdadi's decisions and was punished, but still retained general favor. He became the "supervisor of development and manufacturing", holding this position unil 2017. He was known as "The Professor", because he graduated in Islamic Studies in Mosul, whereas the nickname "The Destroyer" stemmed from his reputation as a ruthless persecutor. He is also famous as head of security for Islamic State operatives, and as the coordinator of ISIL terrorist cells in North Africa and Europe.

During the International military intervention against ISIL, Qardash oversaw operations against the Free Syrian Army in Aleppo and the Syrian Arab Army in Deir ez-Zor. Qardash also personally oversaw the selection of suicide bombers and the conduct of suicide operations for the Islamic State. He supervised the fabrication and storage of mustard gas eventually used against Iraqi forces. Qardash also helped command ISIL troops in the Siege of Kobanî, various Palmyra offensives (Tadmur), and finally during the Battle of Baghuz Fawqani, Baghuz being the last stronghold of ISIL in Syria. At the end of the operations in Baghuz on 23 March 2019, he surrendered and was arrested. As of 2014, Qardash was in his mid-50s.

== Reputed ISIL leader ==
There were reports, refuted later, that Qardash assumed the position of leadership of ISIL on 27 October 2019 following the death of ISIL leader Abu Bakr al-Baghdadi in the Barisha raid conducted by the United States Army in northwest Syria. A statement in August 2019 attributed to ISIL's propaganda arm, the Amaq News Agency, said that Qardash had been named al-Baghdadi's successor.

Some analysts dismissed the statement about Qardash assuming ISIL leadership as a fabrication. Rita Katz, a terrorism analyst and the co-founder of SITE Intelligence, noted that the statement used a different font when compared to other statements and it was never distributed on Amaq or ISIL channels.

== Declaration of al-Qurashi as leader ==
The allegedly false statement re-emerged in October 2019 following the death of al-Baghdadi, and was reported on by several news organizations, including Newsweek. A few days later, on 31 October, ISIL presented Abu Ibrahim al-Hashimi al-Qurashi as the name of the individual who was Baghdadi's successor, and not Qardash.

== Rumoured death ==
Hisham al-Hashimi, an ISIL analyst and counter-terrorism advisor to the Iraqi government, said in October 2019 that, according to Iraqi intelligence sources, Qardash had died in 2017 and his daughter was being held by Iraqi intelligence. He said Qardash's death had been confirmed by both his daughter and other relatives. As of 31 October, his death has not been confirmed by other sources.

== Capture ==
The Iraqi National Intelligence Service (INIS) said in May 2020 that they had taken custody of Abdul Nasser Qardash. Qardash is the highest ranking Islamic State officer to ever be taken into custody. INIS issued a statement saying "Today, the terrorist named Abdul Nasser al-Qardash, the candidate to succeed the criminal al-Baghdadi, was arrested. The arrest came after accurate intelligence." INIS also distributed a picture of a somber and thin Qardash wearing a long-sleeved flannel shirt.

On 21 May 2020, the Iraqi National Intelligence Services further elaborated that Qardash was in charge of manufacturing chemical warfare agents to attack Iraqi troops. It said: "Qardash was responsible for the production and development of mustard gas, which was used for attacking Iraqi forces across the country. He plays a prominent role in the negotiation process between the group [ISIL] and its factions, as well as with other terrorist movements".

There are conflicting reports however that Qardash may have been initially arrested in Syria in 2019 by Kurdish forces but was handed over to the Iraqi authorities only recently (May 2020). The Syrian Democratic Forces affiliated with the Kurdish People's Protection Units (YPG) had captured Qardash after the Battle of Baghuz Fawqani and kept him for months before delivering him to the Iraqi authorities. SDF/YPG quoted his full name as Taha Abdel Rahim Abdallah Bakr Al-Ghassani Al-Makni Hajji Abdul Nasser Qardash (Arabic: طه عبد الرحيم عبد الله بكر الغساني المكنى حجي عبد الناصر قرداش), also known as Abu Muhammad, born in 1967 in Tel Afar and living in Hayy Mshayrfeh, Mosul. His transfer to Iraq was coordinated with the US-led International Coalition.

After his capture, al-Qardash confirmed in an interview with Al Arabiya television: "There was a massive reevaluation of the Islamic State after it lost vast areas including Kobani and many other areas. There were three of us, myself [Qardash], Omar al-Furkan and Ayoub Rakawi, who sat with the leadership to review our steps." After the death of Al-Baghdadi, none of the three emerged as ISIL leader as Abu Ibrahim al-Hashimi al-Qurashi was declared the eventual leader and caliph of the Islamic State.
