= Faysal Ahmad Ali al-Zahrani =

Senior oil official for the Islamic State

Faysal Ahmad Bin 'Ali al-Zahrani
- فيصل أحمد علي الزهراني
- Born: 18–19 January 1986; Saudi Arabia
- Other names: Abu Sara al-Jazrawi, Abu Sarah al-Saudi, Abu Sarah al-Zahrani
- Occupation: Senior oil official (Islamic State)
- Known for: Senior oil official for the Islamic State, overseeing oil and gas activities in IS-controlled territories
- Criminal charges: Sanctions by the United States and the United Nations
- Criminal status: Sanctioned

Faysal Ahmad Bin 'Ali al-Zahrani (Arabic: فيصل أحمد علي الزهراني; born 18–19 January 1986) is a Saudi Arabian man and senior oil official for the Islamic State.

== Early life ==
He was born on 18–19 January 1986 in Saudi Arabia. He is also known as Abu Sara al-Jazrawi, Abu Sarah al-Saudi and Abu Sarah al-Zahrani.

== Islamic State ==
He joined Islamic State in June 2014. In July 2014, he joined the natural resources ministry (Diwan al-Rikaz), which oversees the Islamic State's trade in oil and gas.

In January 2015, he controlled five oil fields. As head of IS's oil and gas division in Al-Hasakah Governorate, he oversaw the activities of seven IS oil and gas officials. He sent the IS treasury tens of millions of dollars in oil and gas revenues between September 2014 and March 2015.

As of May 2015, he was the IS oil and gas division official for al-Barakah Province (IS's territory in Syria's al-Hasakah Governorate), serving directly under IS oil and gas emir for Syria Abu Sayyaf who was killed in May 2015. Prior to Abu Sayyaf's death, al-Zahrani regularly transferred funds to him. In May 2015, he assumed control and oversight of car bomb production at the Rukaybah oil production plant compound. As of June 2015, he supervised an IS oil production plant in Rukaybah.

By August 2015, he was in charge of all IS oil and gas activities in al-Barakah Province, which included supervising oil auctions to local merchants. As of December 2015, al-Zahrani remained responsible for IS oil and gas activities in the areas around Al-Shaddadah.

== US and UN sanctions ==
He was sanctioned by the United States Department of the Treasury on 11 February 2016.

He was listed by the United Nations Security Council on 20 April 2016 "as being associated with IS or Al-Qaeda for “participating in the financing, planning, facilitating, preparing, or perpetrating of acts or activities by, in conjunction with, under the name of, on behalf of, or in support of Islamic State (IS)”, listed as Al-Qaeda in Iraq".
