= Al-Sayyal =

Al-Sayyal السيال
- Town
- Location in Syria
- Coordinates: 34°33′59″N 40°53′45″E
- Country: Syria
- Governorate: Deir ez-Zor
- District: Abu Kamal
- Subdistrict: Abu Kamal

Population (2004)
  - Total: 14,392
- Time zone: UTC+3 (AST)
- City Qrya Pcode: C5163

Al-Sayyal (Arabic: السيال) is a Syrian town located in Abu Kamal District, Deir ez-Zor. According to the Syria Central Bureau of Statistics (CBS), Al-Sayyal had a population of 14,392 in the 2004 census. Al Sayyal was captured by Syrian Arab Army on 6 December 2017 from ISIS.
