= Battle of Baghuz Fawqani =

2019 battle of the Syrian Civil War

- Part of the 2017–2019 Deir ez-Zor campaign, the Rojava–Islamist conflict, and the American-led intervention in the Syrian Civil War
- Map of the military movements during the final segment of the battle, after 12 February 2019. Syrian government territory is situated west and south of the riverbend.
Date	9 February 2019 – 23 March 2019 (1 month and 2 weeks)
Location	Al-Baghuz Fawqani and surroundings, Abu Kamal District, Deir ez-Zor Governorate, Syria 34°27′37″N 40°57′13″E
Result	SDF victory: The SDF launches series of assaults in accordance with civilian evacuations; IS's "tent city", the heart of the IS enclave, is captured by the SDF on 19 March; IS territory is almost completely eradicated from Syria on 23 March, beginning an insurgency phase

Belligerents
Syrian Democratic Forces; International Freedom Battalion; CJTF–OIR: United States; France; United Kingdom; Iraq (minor cross-border support) (Syria) Syrian Arab Republic (minor defensive skirmishes)	Islamic State: Wilāyat ash-Shām; al-Barakah district

Commanders and leaders
Mazlum Kobane (SDF commander in chief); Jiya Furat (SDF commander for Battle of Baghuz); Adnan Afrin (SDF commander and spokesman); Ahmad Abu Khawla (Deir ez-Zor Military Council commander); Mustafa Manbij (Manbij Revolutionaries Battalion commander); Abu Ali Bard (Army of Revolutionaries Commander); Lt Gen Paul LaCamera (Commander of CJTF–OIR) (France) Colonel Francois-Regis Legrier (Commander of Task Force Wagram)	(Islamic State) Abu Bakr al-Baghdadi (Leader of IS) (Islamic State) Abdul Nasser Qardash (IS deputy) (Islamic State) Abu Khaled Al-Ansari †(Senior IS commander)

Units involved
Syrian Democratic Forces; People's Protection Units (YPG); Women's Protection Units (YPJ); Deir ez-Zor Military Council; Manbij Military Council; Manbij Revolutionaries Battalion; Martyr Abdo Dushka Regiment; Army of Revolutionaries; Northern Democratic Brigade; Syriac Military Council (MFS); International Freedom Battalion; TKP/ML/ TIKKO; United States Armed Forces; United States Air Force; United States special operations forces (non-combat role); (France) French Armed Forces; French Air Force; French Army; 68e Régiment d'Artillerie d'Afrique; Special Forces; (United Kingdom) British Armed Forces; Royal Air Force; Special Forces; (Iraq) Iraqi security forces; Popular Mobilization Forces (minor cross-border support); (Syria) Syrian Arab Army; National Defence Forces (minor defensive skirmishes)	(Islamic State) Military of IS

Strength
15,000–17,000 fighters Coalition: air support, artillery, and special operations forces (SOF): (United States) 100 soldiers supporting from Iraq B-1B heavy bombers Cougar, Oshkosh L-ATV, and Humvee vehicles; (France) 40 soldiers supporting from Iraq 3 CAESAR self-propelled howitzer guns Nexter Aravis vehicles; (United Kingdom) Eurofighter Typhoons and MQ-9 Reaper aircraft	4,000–5,000+ fighters

Casualties and losses
65 killed (per SOHR)	259 killed, 4,050 captured (per SOHR); 1,300 killed, 5,000+ captured (per SDF)
- 216 civilians killed by airstrikes (12 Feb. & 18 March; per SOHR); 64 civilians killed by airstrikes (18 March; per NYT); Many Yazidi slaves killed by IS; Italian photographer wounded
- Location of Al-Baghuz Fawqani along the Euphrates River

The Battle of Baghuz Fawqani was an offensive by the Syrian Democratic Forces (SDF), assisted by Combined Joint Task Force – Operation Inherent Resolve (CJTF-OIR) coalition airstrikes, artillery, and special forces personnel, that began on 9 February 2019 as part of the Deir ez-Zor campaign of the Syrian Civil War. The battle—which was composed of a series of ground assaults—took place in and around the Syrian town of Al-Baghuz Fawqani in the Middle Euphrates River Valley near the Iraq–Syria border, and was the territorial last stand of the Islamic State (IS) in eastern Syria.

After corralling IS forces into a densely populated cluster of hamlets and a tent city along the riverside within the first week, the SDF realised that a greater-than-anticipated number of civilians, most of whom were relatives of the what were now mostly foreign IS fighters, were still in the enclave. With CJTF-OIR oversight, the SDF took an incremental approach to the battle, launching assaults then pausing to allow surrendering fighters, hostages, and families to evacuate in order to minimize civilian casualties. The "trickle-out" strategy, coupled with stiff resistance by veteran Islamic State jihadists within a small dense area, prolonged the battle into a protracted siege. The SDF officially declared final victory over the IS in Baghuz Fawqani on 23 March, marking the end of IS-controlled territories in Syria.

During the battle, on 18 March, a coalition airstrike killed many people. The incident, of which disclosure was suppressed by the U.S. military, killed up to 80 people, including 64 civilians and 16 IS militants according to The New York Times, who revealed it to the public in November 2021. A US military investigation in May 2022 concluded that the airstrike killed 52 IS fighters and 4 civilians and did not violate the laws of war.

== Background ==
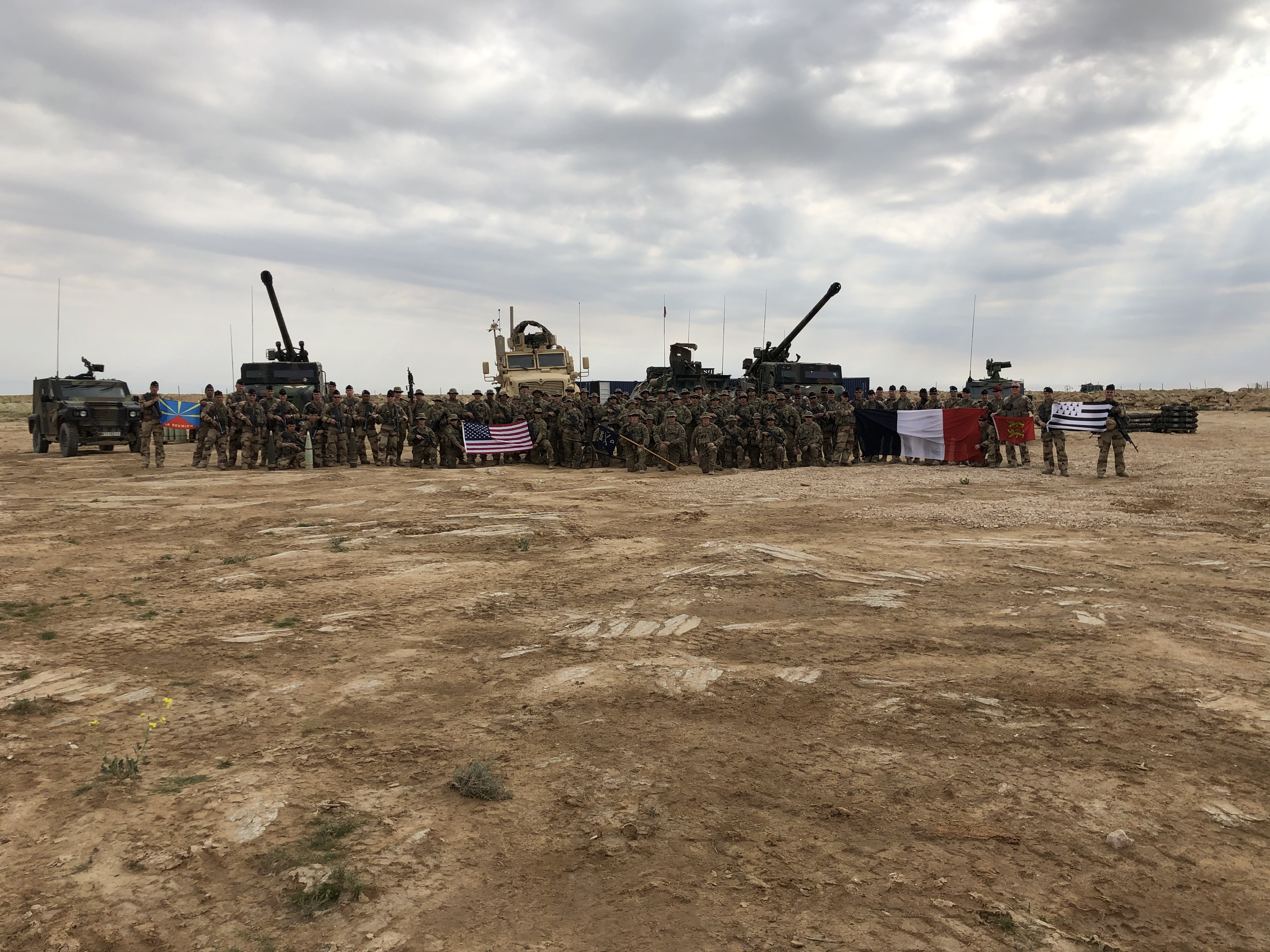
French and American soldiers in support of the CJTF-OIR in Iraq, March 2019. Coalition forces supported SDF advances with airstrikes and cross-border artillery fires from Iraq

Since September 2017, the Syrian Democratic Forces (SDF) had been waging a campaign to wrest territorial control from the Islamic State terror group in eastern Syria. The SDF's advances were supported by American, British, and French forces from the CJTF–OIR Coalition via close air support, French and American artillery, and American special forces assistance and oversight. The SDF launched its third and final phase of their campaign in September 2018, gradually capturing the remaining IS pocket of territory straddling the Euphrates river near the Iraq-Syria border. By 1 February 2019, IS was reduced to four square kilometers of territory, boxed in against the river with the SDF advancing from the northwest, Syrian government forces blocking river crossings, and Iraqi forces deployed to prevent cross-border infiltrations. The massive exodus of civilians complicated advances, with the SDF pausing its advance for almost 10 days prior to the battle. Within the 10 days preceding the battle, over 20,000 civilians fled the enclave. The SDF stated that a number of foreign hostages, including missing British journalist John Cantlie and the kidnapped Italian Jesuit priest Father Paolo Dall'Oglio, were possibly being held in the enclave.

On 9 February 2019, France's Defense minister Florence Parly visited Firebase Saham, a joint French-U.S. artillery fire support base near Al-Qa'im, Iraq that supported the SDF's anti-IS campaign. Meeting with French forces there, Parly told them not to be distracted and that France "is determined to complete this fight against those who have struck her," referring to IS terror attacks in France in recent years.

== The battle ==
The Syrian Democratic Forces announced the decisive, "final battle" against the IS enclave on the evening of 9 February 2019. SDF forces participating in the offensive consisted of around 15,000 fighters, backed by Coalition artillery and close air support, along with assistance from special operations forces (SOF). It was initially estimated that IS still had around 400–1,000 of its most committed, battle-hardened jihadist fighters resisting to the bitter end, though general estimates still varied widely.

=== Opening assault ===
The battle began with a heavy preemptive bombardment throughout the afternoon from SDF mortar teams and U.S. bombers, including Rockwell B-1B Lancers, with intermittent sniper engagements and machine gun clashes throughout the day. Fighting continued into the night with the SDF only advancing until nightfall as Coalition flares illuminated the battlefield amidst numerous air raids and "constant" shelling of al-Baghuz Fawqani; local sources reported night fighting over the Baghuz-Bukhamal bridge as well. The SDF reported the deaths of 37 IS members along with the destruction of 19 enemy forward positions, four roads, one mortar piece, one motorbike, and one weapons cache during the preemptive bombardment.

Throughout the night of 9 February and into the morning of 10 February, the SDF made early advances, seizing 41 tactical points within a total of 2 square kilometers of land while repelling an IS counterattack at 4 a.m. local. The SDF reported killing many IS fighters while only losing two of their own. They also reportedly secured a humanitarian corridor for 200 civilians to flee the fighting. SDF spokesman Mustafa Bali, commenting on the reported secret negotiations between IS, the SDF, and the Coalition, stated that IS representatives had asked for safe passage out of the pocket. Bali said that the SDF would "fight until the very last minute"; however, American negotiators reportedly stated that safe passage to the Idlib Governorate, dominated by IS's rival Hayat Tahrir al-Sham, was an offer still on the table. Meanwhile, commenting on the battle, U.S. President Donald Trump tweeted "The U.S. will soon control 100% of ISIS territory in Syria."

By the morning of 11 February, another 1,500 civilians had fled the area in a column of 17 trucks filled with men, women, and children, some identifying as Iraqi. Hundreds of civilians continued to stream out of the enclave into SDF-Coalition makeshift screening centers established for filtering out fleeing jihadists. An unidentified YPG commander stated that some desperate IS militants would resort to wearing women's clothing when fleeing. "[IS fighters] have been trying to escape in women's clothes," the commander said, that "some of them dress as women because we don't ask the women to raise their hijab."

The Coalition's combat missions continued; Acting U.S. Defense Secretary Patrick Shanahan stated the SDF were making "significant progress" despite poor weather conditions. Poor visibility such as overcast weather or dust storms typically benefited IS fighters as it concealed some of their ground deployments and hindered SDF-Coalition reconnaissance. The Coalition said that despite the poor weather, airstrikes were being called in "whenever possible". IS elements were entrenched and fortified, leaving the SDF to rely greatly on Coalition air power to soften defenses and dislodge strongpoints. The U.S. bombed a mosque in the town reportedly being used as an IS command and control center to direct attacks and deploy suicide car bombs (SVBIEDs) against the SDF. "This mosque lost its protected status when ISIS deliberately chose to use it as a command and control center," the Coalition stated. The mosque strike came amid reports that IS was deliberately using human shields in order to deter Coalition targeting and impede the SDF's advance. Syrian state media reported that about 70 people were killed or wounded on the edge of the town after an airstrike hit a settlement where hundreds of people were taking shelter. A Coalition spokesman responded, "we are aware of open source reports of civilian casualties. We take all allegations of civilian casualties seriously, and understand there is a lot of misinformation as well."

SDF units engaging IS near Al-Baghuz Fawqani, 11 February 2019

The sound of explosions and gunfire echoed dozens of kilometers away from the battlefield as intense Coalition airstrikes and SDF missile attacks continued; eyewitnesses described the mushrooming columns of white and dark grey smoke billowing over the skyline as warplanes and missiles streaked through the sky. The Britain-based Syrian Observatory for Human Rights (SOHR) monitor said the SDF was advancing at a slower momentum than initially expected due to IS's usage of tunnels to navigate the battlefield along with deploying snipers, VBIEDs, anti-tank guided missiles, and land mines against the SDF, forcing them to simultaneously conduct de-mining operations with every advance. United States Central Command (CENTCOM) commander Gen. Joseph Votel, who oversaw the United States' Middle Eastern operations at the time, commented on the battle during a trip to Cairo. "It's a relatively confined space, it's heavily urbanized, it's laden with a lot of explosive hazards, improvised explosive devices for example, and kind of a prepared defense by ISIS," he said, emphasizing the asymmetric warfare commonly associated with fighting IS.

Estimates on the number of remaining IS militants in the enclave varied; SDF officials and SOHR estimated there were around 3,000 mostly foreign IS jihadists remaining, though previous Coalition estimates put the number at about half of that. On 10 February, SDF spokesman Mustafa Bali said up to 600 fighters were still present in Baghuz Fawqani proper. Reports of ongoing backdoor negotiations also persisted; an SDF source denied any such talks were happening, saying that the SDF demanded an unconditional IS surrender. Meanwhile, Italian media reported freelance photographer Gabriele Micalizzi was badly, though not critically, wounded in the head by splinters from a rocket-propelled grenade. Micalizzi was airlifted by the Coalition to Baghdad to be evacuated back to Italy. The Observatory said 13 IS militants, including five suicide attackers, were killed as well as six SDF fighters in recent fighting. 16 civilians were reported to have been killed in airstrikes by the end of 11 February.

=== Reduced momentum and continued civilian exodus ===
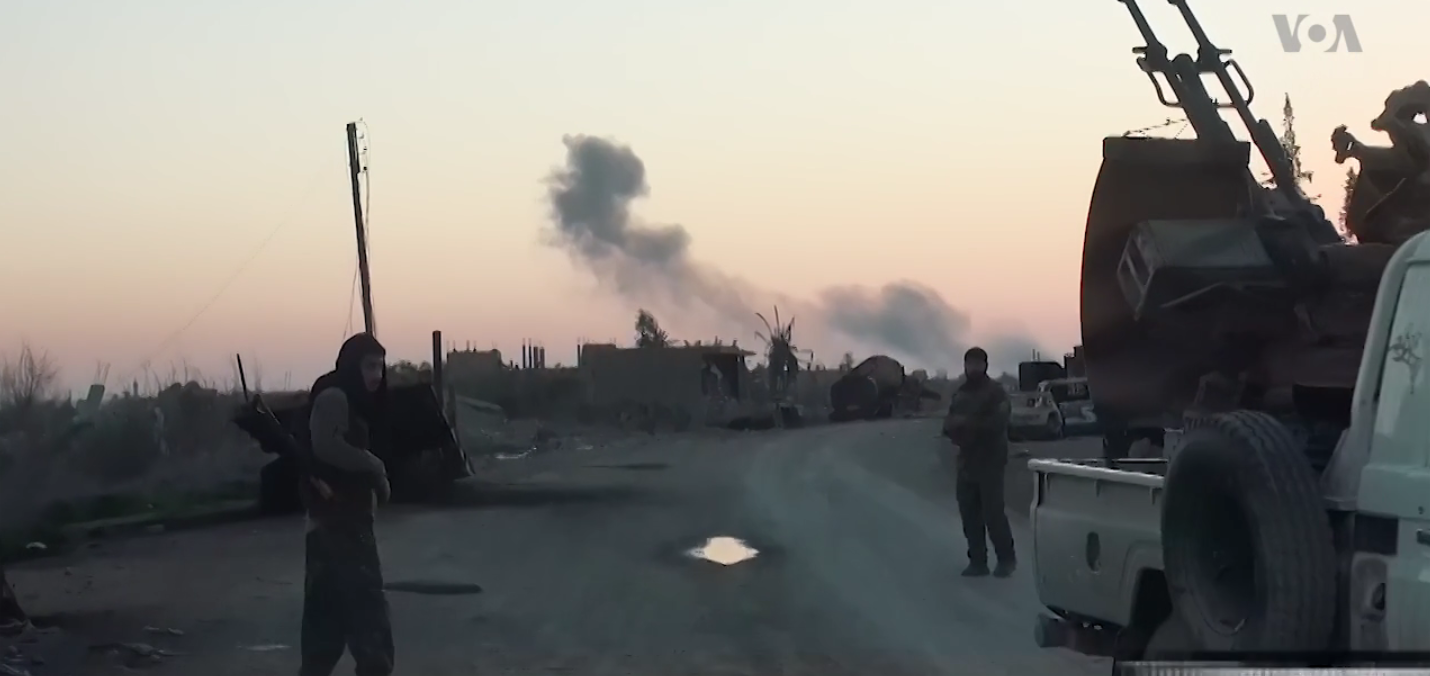
The SDF besieging al-Baghuz Fawqani, 12 February 2019

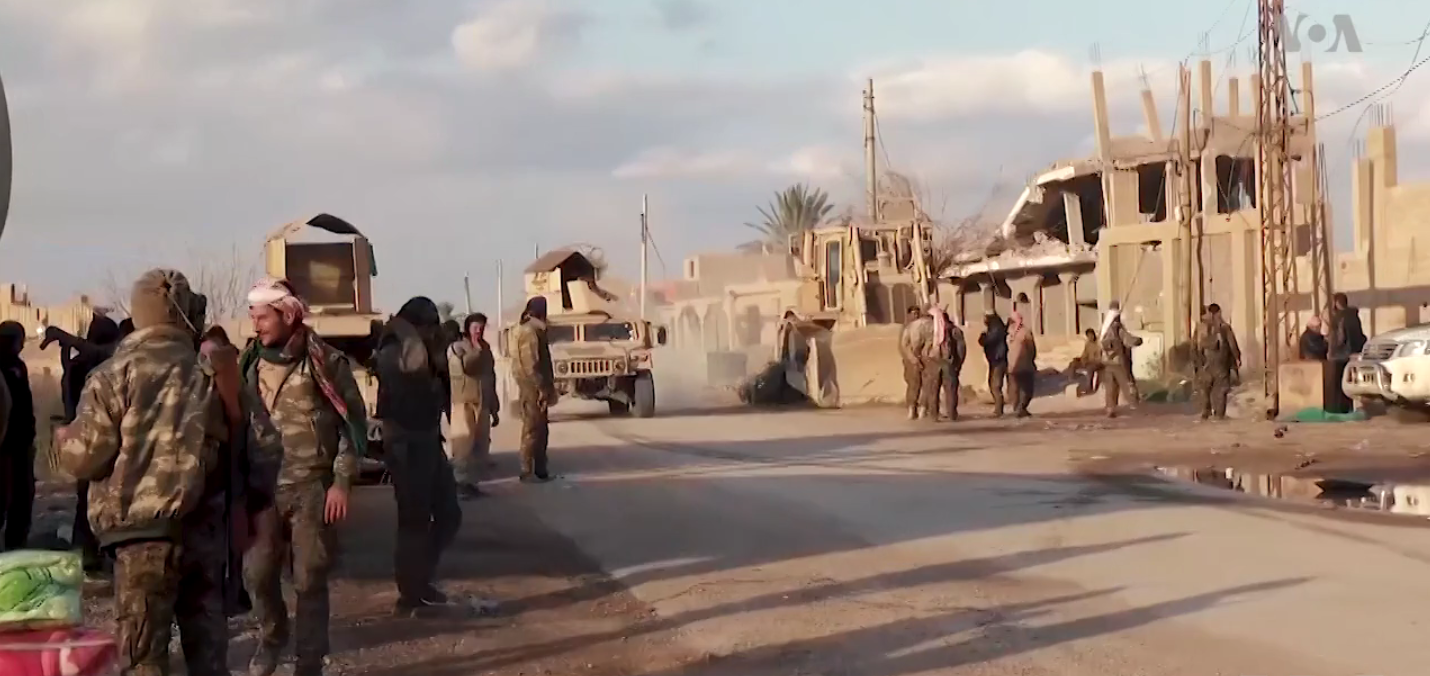
SDF fighters rendezvous, 12 February 2019

On 12 February, civilians continued to flee on the back of dusty trucks filled with women and children bound for SDF-run refugee camps in northeastern Syria, primarily al-Hawl. The civilian truck drivers said 18 foreigners were among the dozens of civilians fleeing with them, including Russians, Turks, and Ukrainians. Regional and international journalists clambered over the edges of the trucks to find non-Arabs among the civilians, some shouting "France? France?" One fleeing civilian, a mother of five, described the bombing as "unimaginable". "There was no food. We ate grass from the ground like sheep... Daesh had blocked the roads and smugglers wanted thousands of U.S. dollars," she added. Two Muslim-convert French mothers that paid to be smuggled out of the enclave stated that "massacres" were taking place inside the town while many others starved. Only Syrian and Iraqi women were allowed to be smuggled out, according to the women.

Violent clashes continued throughout 12 February; Coalition airstrikes bombarded entire districts, such as the Sheikh Hamad neighborhood, as the SDF captured the Baghuz-Bukamal Bridge and made advances in the Al-Khanafirah neighborhood. A fleet of 15 vehicles carrying U.S. soldiers was seen reinforcing a secondary front line, meanwhile IS units used ambush tactics and fielded machine guns and anti-tank guided missiles against SDF positions. Local eyewitnesses said IS was using trash and tire fires to fill the skyline with thick smoke to complicate Coalition airstrike capabilities and to make the air harder to breathe for SDF troops. Syrian reporter Mushin Khalil reported at least 14 SDF fighters were killed on the 12th in an IS counterattack that involved a suicide bomber. At the end of the day, SDF spokesman Mustafa Bali announced that IS controlled only 1 square kilometer of territory, and that all the people remaining there were IS militants and their families. Meanwhile, SOHR reported that U.S. officials demanded IS surrender 40 tons of stolen gold the group possessed in exchange for safe-passage to an "undisclosed location" during purported ongoing negotiations.

On 13 February, reports emerged that IS had executed more than 15 of its own fighters for attempting to surrender, seven of whom were French nationals. After clearing the Sheikh Hamad neighborhood, the SDF were able to break through IS defenses and capture the town center, forcing tens of IS jihadists to flee towards as-Safafinah with the rest of IS's militants held up at a nearby refugee camp near the town orchards. The SDF reported receiving 425 civilians fleeing the pocket within the past 24 hours by truck and by foot; some of the fleeing women – many of them wives of IS fighters – had gunshot wounds, likely from IS forces shooting at their own fleeing wives in hopes of using their families as both human shields and bargaining chips during negotiations. SDF and Coalition personnel singled out fleeing male civilians during processing and were reportedly using retinal scans, fingerprinting, and other biometric data gathering tools when screening them for jihadist ties. Meanwhile, the International Rescue Committee stated 51 people had died on the way from the enclave to the Al-Hawl refugee camp or shortly after arriving, most in the past few weeks. The majority were toddlers or newborn babies dying from hypothermia via long treks through the cold desert terrain with their relatives.

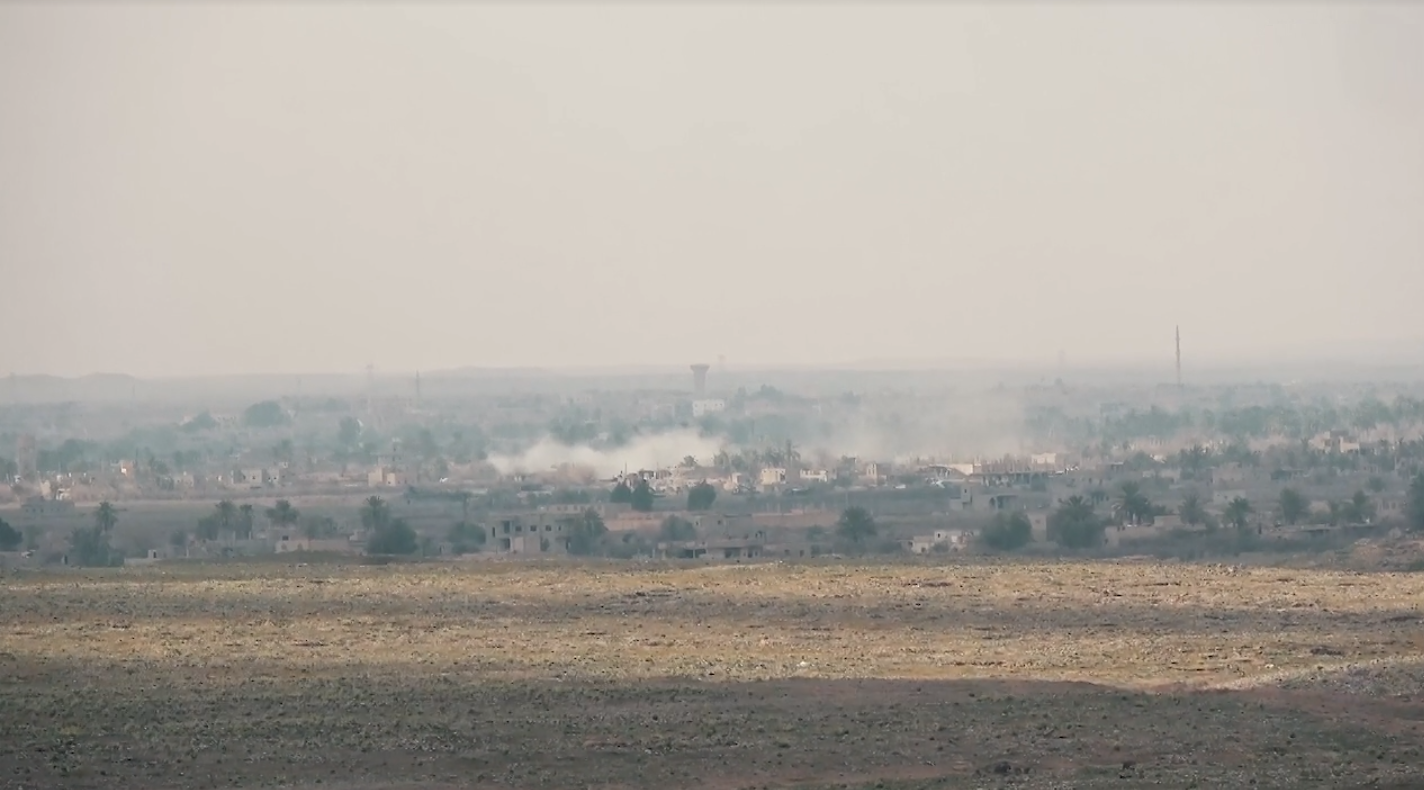
Clashes in Al-Baghuz Fawqani, 14 February 2019

On 14 February, journalists reporting outside of the town said things were "quiet" on their end, as the pace of the SDF's advance had slowed. A few civilians came out overnight – the smallest batch in weeks – according to one aid worker on site. An SDF official said that clearing operations were continuing while the day's fighting mainly took place on the town's northeastern axis where he added that combatants were fielding new "thermal weapons." The SDF reported capturing a clinic used for treating IS troops and a weapons cache full of ammo, including 10 mortars, an artillery piece, and a car bomb rigged with explosives on the northeast axis. SDF fighters on the southeastern axis reportedly discovered the bodies of 26 IS troops late 14 February, including that of a child soldier.

Rainy weather, fleeing civilians, and IS ambush tactics continued to bog down SDF advances on 15 February as engineering teams conducted continuous tunnel clearing and de-mining operations on the northeastern axis. Coalition surgical strikes were reportedly reduced to a maximum of two a day as Adnan Afrin, a SDF commander, said the SDF wanted to avoid "causing a massacre" due to IS bringing hundreds of civilian hostages out from tunnels in recent days. SOHR reported that a Coalition convoy of seven trucks, three ambulances and other vehicles headed towards the remaining IS-held area aiming to draw out the remaining jihadists and their families. At the end of the day, 200 IS fighters surrendered.

=== Standoff with IS ===
Speaking at the al-Omar oil field staging area on 16 February, SDF commander Jiya Furat stated that IS's remaining territory was reduced to "700 square meters", (Note: Probably a misstatement, more likely 700 meters on each side which is 0.49 square kilometers.) and that a declaration of victory will be announced in "days." Furat added that ten previously-captured SDF members were also released by IS as the terror group again demanded to be allowed to leave for Idlib. The SOHR stated that the SDF was almost done establishing control, but residual IS fighters were hiding out in tunnel networks with hostages. Two Coalition airstrikes were also reported in the area. Civilian evacuations and minor front line skirmishes continued throughout to the 18th.

On 19 February, with IS's territory reduced to a small stretch of encircled hamlets comprising a couple hundred square meters, the SDF affirmed their ultimatum to IS: surrender or die in battle. The SDF continued to operate cautiously as dozens of trucks evacuating civilians regularly streamed in and out of the region. The United Nations expressed concern over "the situation of some 200 families, including many women and children, who are reportedly trapped" in the besieged IS enclave. By nightfall, two Coalition airstrikes were reported in the area as many IS fighters seemed to have refused to surrender.

SDF officials stated on 20 February that they wanted to evacuate every civilian before storming the remaining "120–300 IS fighters", believed to be holed up at the Hawi al-Dandal hamlet area with "at least 100 civilians" present. On 21 February, SOHR reported about 260 mostly foreign IS fighters remained encircled in the farmlands and in nearby tunnels, seemingly preferring to die fighting than surrender to the SDF. The SDF predicted the last batch of civilians would be out of the area by the 21st, but no civilians were seen leaving during the day. Journalists reported seeing warplanes and U.S. attack helicopters scouting the area, but no signs of combat. Meanwhile, French sources reported that the Coalition was verifying whether French jihadist Fabien Clain was killed in an airstrike the day prior that also left his brother Jean-Michel seriously wounded. The Coalition confirmed Clain's death on 28 February.

The SDF said they were "surprised" at the number of civilians still being held in the enclave. Groups of civilians continued to flee in the direction of SDF forces, some escaping through tunnels and wrecked buildings. Human Rights Watch quoted interviewed civilians as saying that smugglers were charging 400 U.S. dollars per person. An SDF commander stated that it could take four to five more days before all civilians were completely out of the area of operations.

In the early hours of 26 February, another batch of IS fighters and their families surrendered to the SDF. The United Nations Office for the Coordination of Humanitarian Affairs (OCHA) for Syria stated that 9,000 people had evacuated the enclave within the previous 72 hours, 99 percent of which were women and children. SOHR reported 1,400 people had evacuated the area since 24 February, including dozens of suspected IS militants. Recent Coalition airstrikes in the area focused mostly on pushing back IS fighters that blocked roads and escape routes in an effort to prevent civilian hostages from escaping in prior weeks.

The Coalition released a summary of its recent air and artillery strikes in the area on 27 February:

"Between 10 February to 23 February, the Coalition conducted 186 strikes consisting of 426 engagements, including damaging or destroying: 285 ISIL tactical units, 189 fighting positions, 50 supply routes, 22 staging areas, 16 boats, 15 vehicles, six petroleum oil tankers, six aircraft operations areas, six VBIEDs, four command and control "nodes", three weapons caches, three heavy machine guns, three pieces of engineering equipment, two buildings, two tunnels, one cave, one IED production facility and one petroleum oil storage facility. The Coalition defines a "strike" as "one or more kinetic engagements that occur in roughly the same geographic location to produce a single, sometimes cumulative effect in that location."

On 28 February, SDF spokesman Adnan Afrin announced discovery of a mass grave found 10 days prior in the town. The grave contained dozens of bodies of men and women along with severed heads and a Furat FM executive said that most of the bodies had been shot in the head. The SDF was trying to confirm whether they were Yazidis or IS members. SDF spokeswoman Lilwa Abdulla subsequently confirmed the victims were Yazidi though there was no specific number. Locals have however said the corpses were victims of airstrikes.

On 1 March, the Free Burma Rangers, one of the few aid groups in the area, said 15,000 people had fled the Baghuz area within the last month. At a screening center 20 kilometers away from Baghuz Fawqani, one Egyptian woman told reporters that IS was preventing men under 40 from quitting the redoubt, including her 27-year-old husband, in expectation of a final battle. According to media reports, some of the evacuated IS brides still proclaimed loyalty to "the Islamic State" and its leader. Some even shouted jihadist slogans from the back of fleeing trucks. "Abu Bakr Baghdadi will prevail," one woman said. "We left because God created a reason to get out of here, but the Islamic State will always prevail. Abu Bakr Baghdadi is in the tunnels and they will bring victory." As reporters left, the woman and her children shouted, "The Islamic State will remain!"

=== Resumed assault ===
At 6:00 pm local time (16:00 GMT) on 1 March, three weeks into the assault on Baghuz Fawqani, SDF spokesman Mustafa Bali announced that the standoff with IS was over and that SDF units had begun storming the remaining riverside encampments, which were a tent city said to be atop a network of caves and tunnels being used by the entrenched jihadists. Bali expected a "fierce" battle as he said that the SDF resumed ground operations only after the evacuation of the last batch of civilians willing to leave and following the previous release of captured SDF fighters. "The people we evacuated today told us that no civilians were inside and that those still inside did not want to leave," Bali stated. He added that SDF units would advance cautiously to avoid IEDs and land mines, and that any civilians encountered will be isolated though units will advance onward.

Reports of heavy fighting and increased Coalition air presence proliferated. Bali, who said he expected the battle to be over "soon", stated that the SDF were advancing on two fronts with their units fielding medium to heavy weapons. At least three SDF fighters were injured in overnight fighting. By noon on 2 March, IS were deploying snipers, booby traps, drones, and "thermal missiles" against the SDF as U.S. helicopters circled the area. Black smoke occasionally filled the sky, apparently from airstrikes. An SDF spokesman, Zana Amedi, downplayed the SDF's dependence on air power in the assault due to jihadists using tunnels and human shields, saying “Now it's mostly clashes. There are almost no airstrikes this morning. There were few airstrikes in the morning and nothing else after that.” Commander Adnan Afrin said the 1 kilometer buffer zone between front lines had been subsumed in the opening advance; he added that there had so far been no suicide attacks, though some land mines went off. He also stated that eight SDF personnel were wounded so far, some critically. The SOHR reported ten IS fighters had been killed in recent clashes, adding that Syrian government forces and their allies clashed with IS militants that tried to infiltrate/escape cross to the west bank of the Euphrates river, which physically separates Syrian government and SDF territory; the engagement left seven jihadists dead.

IS began deploying VBIEDs using cars, motorbikes, and bicycles against SDF positions on the night of 2 March, several of which were subsequently destroyed by both Coalition air raids and SDF snipers and rockets; IS also shelled approaching ground forces. An airstrike on a reported ammunition depot set off a large explosion, causing a smouldering fire that led to continued secondary explosions into the next day, filling the sky with smoke. By the end of 2 March, SDF forces had made limited advances, capturing six tactical points and a hill overlooking the main IS camp. By 3 March, the SDF reportedly had 160 machine gun units stationed at 50 meter intervals along the front line as sporadic gunfire and SDF mortars and artillery continued to shell the camp. With IS offering stiff resistance during the daytime, the SDF largely advanced and conducted closer-range combat after nightfall under the support of U.S. helicopters and warplanes; the dug-in jihadists were "outgunned" and did not have night vision, according to the SDF. The SDF had lost three fighters and had captured 13 to 14 points by the end of 3 March, according to a commander. The SOHR cited local reports alleging that U.S. elements had deployed white phosphorus incendiary munitions in Baghuz; the deliberate use of the weapon in the presence of civilian areas is banned by the Convention on Certain Conventional Weapons. A Coalition spokesman flatly denied the allegations.

=== Second standoff ===
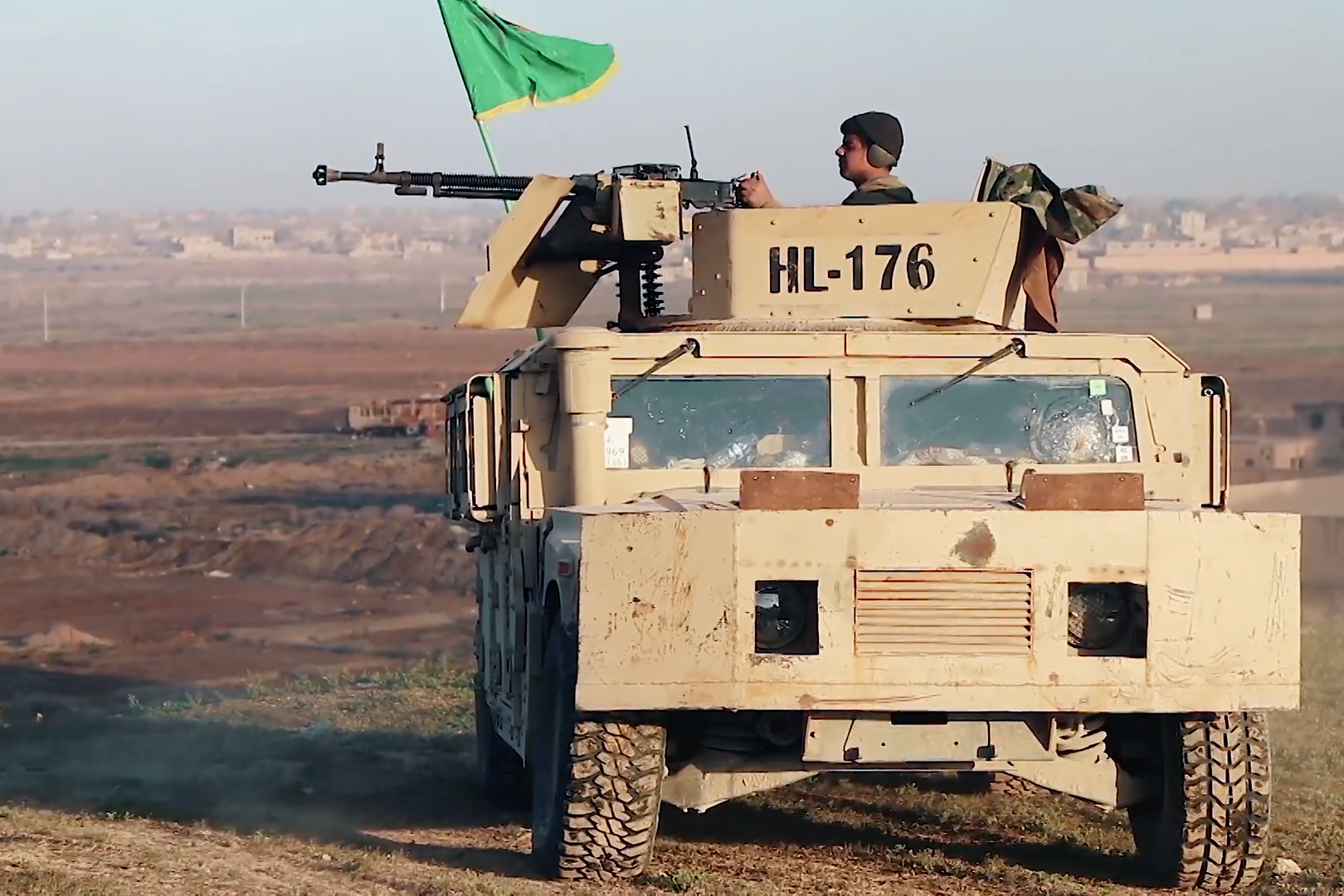
SDF gunner firing towards the IS camp, 4 March 2019

Upon noticing the significant civilian presence still remaining in the area, the SDF again slowed down its general advance on 4 March. The move contradicted past statements that the assault wasn't going to begin until all civilians were out. "We're slowing down the offensive in Baghouz due to a small number of civilians held as human shields by Daesh," Mustafa Bali said. The SDF opened a secondary humanitarian corridor to facilitate evacuations. Later in the day, SDF and Coalition officials stated that around 500 people, including 150 suspected IS militants, had surrendered, with 200 more expected to leave. The exact number of remaining IS fighters within the camp remained unknown; there were also continued concerns over just how extensive the tunnel networks were — some SDF fighters estimated that the tunnels extended for more than 2 kilometers. Meanwhile, local reports stated that IS commander Jamal Khaled Masoulkh was killed in an airstrike in Baghuz Fawqani the night before. He was the deputy commander of the Islamic State, stationed in Raqqa (IS's former de facto capital), before he moved to eastern Syria.

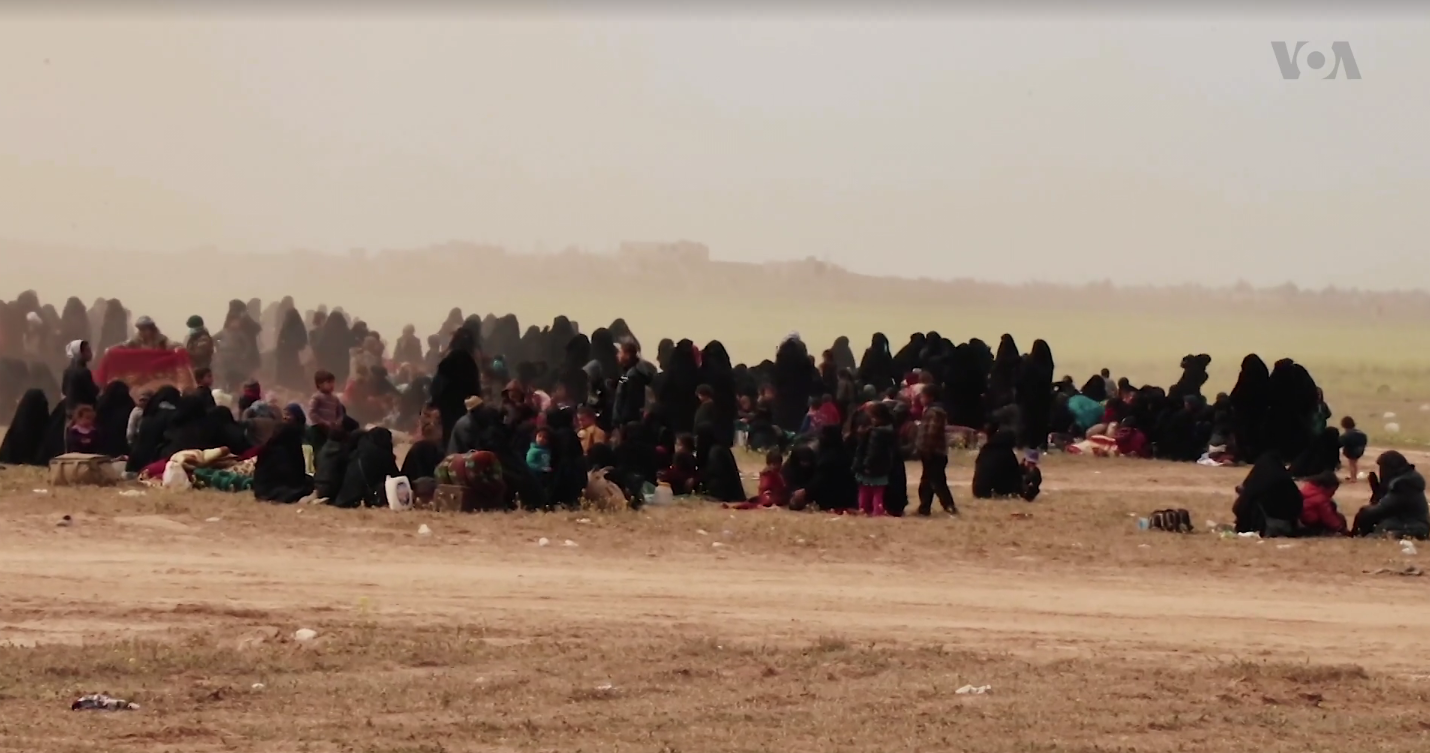
Civilians at an SDF-Coalition screening center, 8 March 2019. Most of the evacuees were families of IS fighters.

On 5 March, the SDF reported that 3,000 people had fled through the corridor since the slowdown on 4 March, with 10,000 people having fled in total since 10 February. One of the evacuees, Dorothee Maquere — the wife of deceased terrorist Fabien Clain — confirmed that his brother Jean-Michel Clain, who was critically injured from the Coalition airstrike on their position on 20 February, died on 3 March after an SDF mortar round landed near him. She also stated that Hayat Boumeddiene, wanted by French authorities as a suspected accomplice in the January 2015 Île-de-France attacks, was killed in a separate strike during the prior week, which reportedly hit an IS safe house known as the "French House," where many French nationals were staying. Other interviewed evacuees corroborated these statements, though they could not be independently verified at the time. On 6 March, the SDF reported it had captured 400 IS militants overnight.

The standoff continued by 10 March, with IS flags still seen flying over the besieged encampment. SDF fighters, perched atop rooftops just hundreds of meters away from the camp, saw "exhausted"-looking IS militants, women and children milling about, yet to surrender even with dozens of evacuation trucks flowing in and out daily. The presence of the jihadists' civilian families continued to delay the SDF's attempts to clear the camp. Later on the same day, SDF spokesman Mustafa Bali stated that tens of thousands of people, including at least 4,000 IS fighters, had surrendered to the SDF within the past month. He also stated that no more civilians had left the IS enclave that day, and that SDF fighters did not see any further civilians within the IS pocket.

=== Third assault ===
The second standoff came to an end on the afternoon of 10 March, with the SDF resuming the assault at 6:00 pm local time. Heavy ground engagements, including machine gun fire and snipers, were reported. The SDF stated that warplanes and mortars were targeting weapons arsenals in the camp, the destruction of which set sections of the camp ablaze. On 11 March, IS fought back with suicide attacks — four jihadists assaulted SDF positions, setting off their explosive belts, though only succeeding in damaging a "minesweeper," according to the SDF. 11 Coalition strikes were reported as SDF units fired on the camp from all sides with artillery, rocket barrages, and heavy weapons — they made limited advances, reportedly capturing an arms depot. Five SDF troops were wounded and one was killed, per the SDF. The SOHR reported that seven IS militants had been captured since 10 March. Completely besieged in Baghuz Fawqani, IS released propaganda film and audio recordings via its few social media outlets late on 11 March desperately urging its supporters abroad to stage attacks against the "Crusaders," a term used by jihadists to refer to western nations, and for followers to maintain their faith in God and the caliphate amidst complete territorial collapse. Syrian state media, citing local sources, reported that recent Coalition air raids had killed more than 50 civilians in the camp; this was not confirmed by the Coalition.

Voice of America report on SDF nighttime operations against IS, 12 March 2019

On 12 March, hundreds of people were seen surrendering to the SDF en masse, including fighters and their families. The SDF declared that the main battle was "as good as over" and they only needed to establish their control against resisting IS fighters holed up in complex tunnel networks in the area before declaring victory. They reported 25-38 IS militants had been killed since 10 March, while they themselves suffered three casualties. The Coalition had conducted around 20 airstrikes targeting weapons caches and command posts. Meanwhile, U.S. officials affirmed they did not believe any senior IS leaders remained in the area, assessing they had dispersed to other locations as part of the group's shift towards insurgency. On 13 March, mortars and airstrikes continued to pound the camp as the SDF made limited advances on some points. IS took advantage of a dust storm to mount two counterattacks using suicide bombers; the first attack was repelled but the second attack was more successful, killing four SDF fighters and wounding eight others. An SDF commander stated "The objective of our advance is to terrorize IS fighters so they surrender, and for the civilians to come out." The SDF reported around 3,000 more people, including suspected jihadists, had fled the area since 11 March, a testament to just how densely populated the area remained and the inaccuracy of earlier estimates.

On 14 March, heavy clashes resumed after 1,300 jihadists and their relatives surrendered during a lull in fighting, many of them being foreign nationals. The YPG, the SDF's spearheading fighting force, reported that IS had deployed more than 20 suicide bombers during counterattacks within the past two days, and that at least 112 IS fighters had been killed since 10 March. On 17 March, the SDF released their figures on the operation since 9 January: 34,000 total civilians evacuated, 29,600 IS fighters and their family members surrendered, including more than 5,000 fighters, 1,306 IS militants killed, and 520 captured in operations. In turn, they put their casualties at 11 dead and 61 injured.

Between 18–19 March, the SDF announced significant progress, capturing IS's encampment and taking hundreds of wounded, surrendering militants into custody. The camp was the biggest remaining area held by IS in Al-Baghuz Fawqani, itself the last populated area the militant group held. SDF spokesman Mustafa Bali announced that the SDF had control of all of Al-Baghuz Fawqani, with the exception of a few pockets of resistance along the shores of the Euphrates river, where intermittent clashes continued with resisting IS fighters trapped between the captured camp and the river. The SDF also stated that more than 5,000 people could still be remaining in the areas yet to be captured by the SDF, as the vast tunnel network in Al-Baghuz Fawqani made it difficult to estimate the precise number of people hiding there. Among the group that surrendered were suspects of the Manbij bombing that targeted U.S. soldiers in January 2019.

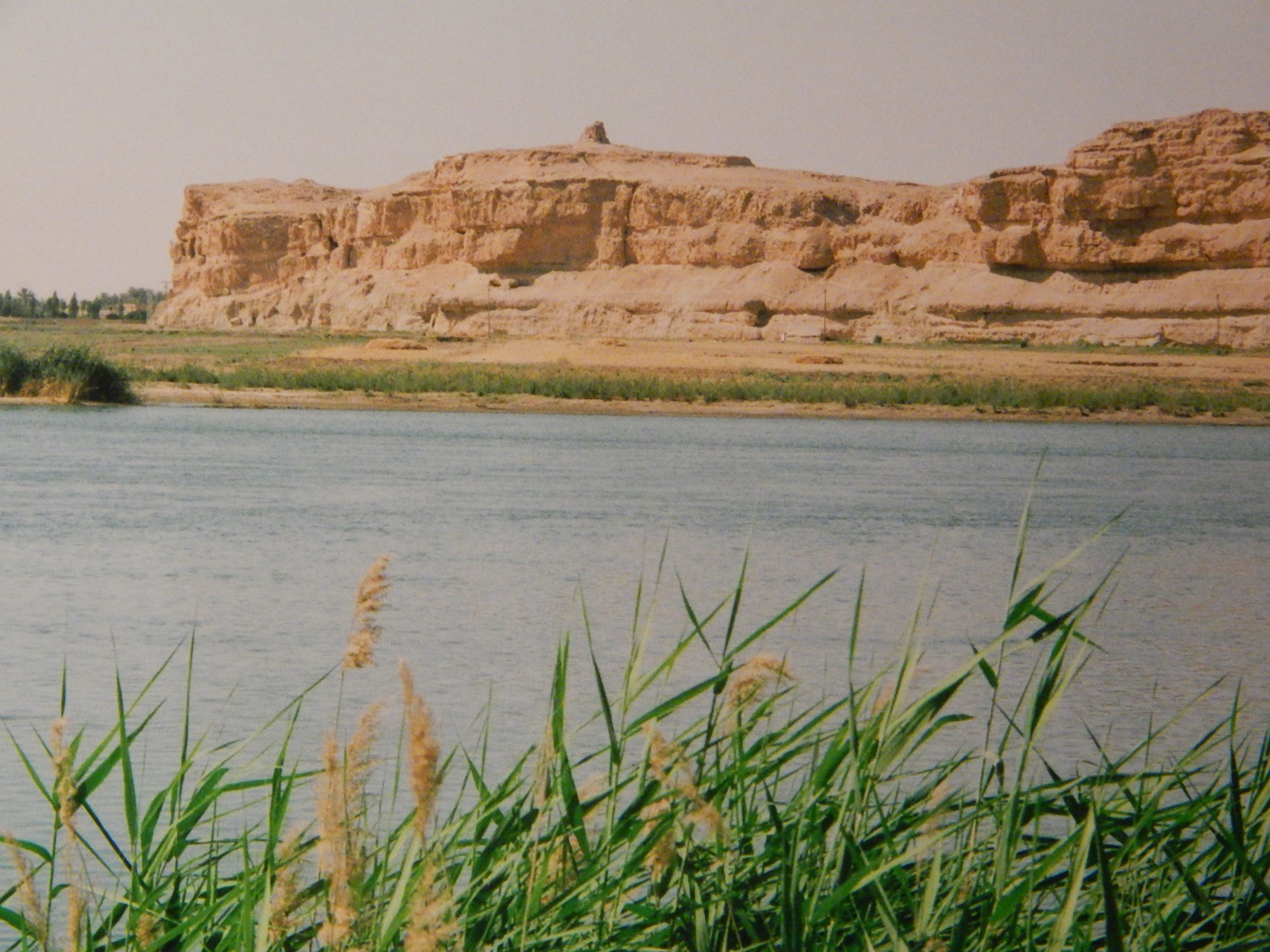
The southwestern cliffs of Jabal Baghuz ("Baghuz Cliff") in 2014. Many IS fighters and their families hid in deep tunnels and caves along the cliff side. Access points were targeted by airstrikes in the last days of the battle

In response to the developments, U.S. president Donald Trump predicted that the remaining IS holdout would be cleared "by tonight" during a speech at the Lima Army Tank Plant in Ohio on 20 March, saying, "The caliphate is gone as of tonight." Meanwhile, there were little signs of clashes in Baghuz Fawqani as Kurdish forces celebrated Newroz, the Kurdish new year, coupled with early celebrations of the battle concluding. An SDF official said that their forces were now largely searching tunnels of IS fighters as international journalists reported seeing ongoing evacuations of women and children in the camp. The Baghuz area remained largely quiet on 21 March as cautious clearing operations against mines, booby traps, tunnels, and camouflaged trenches continued; SDF personnel boasted that IS's black standard flags, which "instilled fear" in the populace, no longer flew over the town. Anticipation of a pending declaration of victory over IS resulted in premature local and regional reports stating the entirety of the area was cleared and that the SDF had declared victory. Both SDF and U.S. officials denied that the town was fully liberated and warned against premature declarations. "We will continue fighting with our partners and allies, hunting ISIS wherever they may be," the Pentagon said, attesting to the fact that even after the declaration, IS as a group was not defeated and much of its leadership remained at-large. Coalition airstrikes on two pockets of militants were reported late in the day. The YPG said some of the strikes targeted one group of fighters that had been pushed to the edge of the river and the rest were aimed at a second group which had taken cover by the Jabal Baghuz cliffs on the outskirts of the town. IS's Amaq News Agency also released footage, recorded inside the camp during the siege, mocking U.S. efforts to topple the "caliphate"; videos released by IS in preceding weeks reportedly depicted women joining the male IS fighters in combat while defending the camp.

On 23 March, after weeks of civilian evacuations and clashes with IS's most committed fighters, the SDF officially declared final victory over IS in Baghuz Fawqani during a victory ceremony at the al-Omar oil field staging area, further north up the Euphrates River. Speaking at the ceremony, senior U.S. diplomat William Roebuck called the territorial defeat of the IS a "critical milestone" that dealt a critical blow to the terror group, while also stressing that the group still remained a global security threat. At Baghuz Fawqani, journalists toured the war-torn IS encampment, with some journalists describing it as a "wasteland" strewn with debris, discarded civilian belongings, and stockpiles of unused mortars, rockets, and suicide vests; journalists wrote that some corpses could still be seen and there was a faint smell of dead bodies in the air. Between 10 March and 23 March, the Coalition conducted 193 strikes consisting of 338 engagements, destroying 104 IS vehicles, 63 supply routes, 39 fighting positions, 31 VBIEDs, nine tactical vehicles, six fuel tankers, four weapons caches, two command and control nodes, one tunnel, one tanker for petroleum oil and lubricants, one mortar system, and one checkpoint.

The SDF flag was raised over Baghuz Fawqani near the end of the battle, even as journalists reported mortars and gunfire near the cliff overlooking the camp, where airstrikes were reported during the previous day, as part of clean-up operations. Nevertheless, the battle concluded the SDF's multi-year Deir ez-Zor campaign and marked the territorial end of IS's self-declared "caliphate" that once ruled over as many as 8 million people and erased the borders between Iraq and Syria. IS's leader Abu Bakr al-Baghdadi remained unaccounted along with a number of foreign hostages who were presumed to be held in Baghuz Fawqani.

== Aftermath ==
=== Developments during the battle ===
Both before and throughout the battle, immense focus was put on the surrounding humanitarian situation in the IS enclave. The SDF helped transfer tens of thousands of civilians to internally displaced persons camps in northeast Syria while also holding over 1,000 captured IS suspects and their family members as a result of their conquests. Both the SDF and the U.S. began urging nations abroad to repatriate the captured jihadists during the later stages of the battle.

By 1 March, the population of the Al-Hawl refugee camp soared past 50,000, due to the massive civilian evacuations from the Baghuz Fawqani region. Aid organizations feared that dysentery and other diseases could break out from the overflowing camp. The United Nations stated that 84 people, mostly children, died while traveling to Al-Hawl, since December 2018. This number was raised to 100 by the end of the battle, and the refugee camp population had swelled to at least 74,000 people.

"According to the parameters of this world [...] we lost, but not according to the parameters of the next world."

— Abu Abd al-Azim, IS fighter. IS promised its followers rewards in the afterlife for their service at Baghuz Fawqani.

On 7 March, in regards to the evacuations, CENTCOM commander Gen. Joseph Votel stated that he believed that surrendered IS fighters were largely "unrepentant, unbroken and radicalized," and were waiting "for the right time to resurge". "We will need to maintain a vigilant offensive against this now widely dispersed and disaggregated organization that includes leaders, fighters, facilitators, resources and toxic ideology," he added. This view was supported by subsequent interviews with surrendered IS militants and some of their family members. By 9 March, one month into the protracted battle/stand-off, many evacuating IS militants and their families reportedly remained unrepentant and devoted to the "caliphate" and hoped for future "conquests".

=== Following the battle ===
On 23 March, in reaction to the SDF's victory, French President Emmanuel Macron tweeted that "a major danger to our country is now eliminated, yet the threat remains and the fight against terrorist groups must continue." Hours after the battle, an NBC News crew vehicle in Syria was struck by an IED, killing the local driver but not harming the rest of the news team. It was not immediately clear whether it was a targeted attack or unexploded ordnance.

On March 27 or 28, the United States Air Force dropped three bunker buster bombs on a cave held by IS fighters at the cliffside of Jabal Baghuz.

On 2 April, the SDF confirmed they were still conducting post-battle clearing operations in the Baghuz area, particularly in the vicinity of Jabal Baghuz, where scattered IS elements continued to offer stubborn insurgency-style resistance via extensive cave and tunnel systems. These clashes continued into 22 April, when a large group of IS militants from Jabal Baghuz attempted to cross the Euphrates River to escape into the Syrian Desert, which was under the control of forces loyal to the Syrian government in Damascus. The Syrian Army responded by attacking the group of militants.

On 5 April, about 200 IS prisoners at the Dêrik detention center in SDF-controlled al-Malikiyah attempted a breakout, simultaneously attacking prison guards and attempting to procure firearms. Local security forces and reinforcing SDF personnel responded quickly to the incident, along with the United States Air Force flying two fighter jets over the area as an intimidation tactic. The uprising was put down "peacefully", with no deaths reported.

On 29 April, IS leader Abu Bakr al-Baghdadi appeared in a video for the first time in five years, discussing topics concerning the group, including its increasing resurgence in Libya along with the 2019 Sri Lanka Easter bombings, stating that the attacks were revenge for the events in Baghuz Fawqani. Regarding the events in Baghuz Fawqani itself, al-Baghdadi stated: "The battle of Baghouz is finished, but it demonstrated the barbarity and savagery of the nation of the Cross towards the nation of Islam..." while adding "There will be more to come after this battle."

In March 2021, two years after the battle, Rudaw reported on the state of Baghuz Fawqani. The town lacked basic utilities such as electricity and running water, and many buildings remained in ruins. According to Baghuz chieftain Salim Khalaf, "A total of 650 houses were completely destroyed during the fight to recapture Baghouz [from IS]. Another 2,000 households were damaged. Only 1,000 houses remained intact and did not see destruction." Most residents were reportedly reluctant to return, fearing attacks by IS remnants, and the residents that had returned to the town struggled to make a living.

In November 2021, United States Central Command officially acknowledged that the bombing over Baghuz on March 18, 2019 had killed dozens of civilians. The acknowledgement came in response to an inquiry from The New York Times. They stated that 80 people had been killed including at least 16 Islamic State fighters.

== See also ==
- Death of Abu Bakr al-Baghdadi
- List of wars and battles involving the Islamic State
- List of last stands
- Battle of Tora Bora
- Battle of Mukalla (2016)
- Battle of Sirte (2016)
- Battle of Mosul (2016–17)
- Battle of Raqqa (2017)
- Battle of Marawi
- 2017 Western Iraq campaign
- Battle of al-Hasakah (2022)
- Brides of the Islamic State
