= Hasrat, Syria =

Hasrat حسرات
- Town
- Location in Syria
- Coordinates: 34°37′2″N 40°54′2″E
- Country: Syria
- Governorate: Deir ez-Zor
- District: Abu Kamal
- Subdistrict: Abu Kamal

Population (2004)
  - Total: 6,306
- Time zone: UTC+3 (AST)
- City Qrya Pcode: C5164

Hasrat (Arabic: حسرات) is a Syrian town located in Abu Kamal District, Deir ez-Zor. According to the Syria Central Bureau of Statistics (CBS), Hasrat had a population of 6,306 in the 2004 census.
