= Abu Atiya =

Jordanian Jihadist

Abu Atiya (Arabic: أبو عطية) (also rendered in Latin script as, inter alia Abu 'Atiya, Abou Attiya and Abu Attiyah) was the nom de guerre of a Jordanian alleged jihadist whose true name has been reported variously as Adnan Muhammad Sadiq, sometimes in whole, and sometimes followed by Abu Najila, and as Adnan Sadiq Muhammad Abu Injila.

Abu Atiya associated with Musab al-Zarqawi, leader of Jama'at al-Tawhid wal-Jihad. In 2003, as part of his case for the forthcoming invasion of Iraq, U.S. Secretary of State Colin Powell accused Abu Atiya of being a key organiser in an alleged plot to conduct lethal attacks in Europe using the nerve agent ricin.

He is not to be confused with the target of Operation Larchwood 4, who was captured by the British SAS in Iraq in 2006. The target was a different associate of Al-Zarqawi, but journalist Mark Urban decided to refer to the man as Abu Atiya in an account of the operation.

== Early involvement in transnational jihadism ==
U.S. officials suspected that Abu Atiya was related to Al-Zarqawi, and that Abu Atiya's father had helped run Al-Zarqawi's training camp in Herat Province, Afghanistan. Abu Atiya is often said to have trained at the Herat camp, and sometimes to have been a senior subordinate or confidante of Al-Zarqawi's there. At the time, Al-Zarqawi was in touch with Al-Qaeda, and had received support from them to set up his camp, but he was not yet a member of the organisation.

== Pankisi Gorge crisis and ricin allegations ==
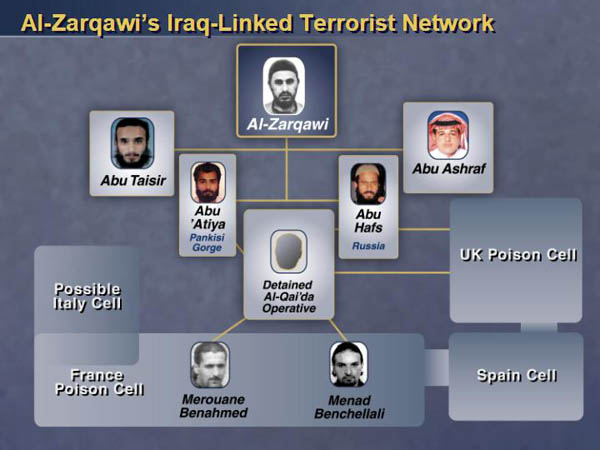
Colin Powell's February 2003 UN presentation included this slide representing Abu Atiya and others as part of the Al-Zarqawi's global terrorist network. Substantial parts of Powell's presentation were later shown to be false.

Abu Atiya moved to the Pankisi Gorge, Georgia in 2001. Transnational jihadists and North Caucasian separatists battling Russia had found refuge in the Gorge since the beginning of the Second Chechen War in 1999. Their numbers swelled the next year following the fall of the separatist capital, Grozny, to Russian troops. A French intelligence report dated 6 November 2002, later filed in a court case, stated that he was in charge of preparations there for chemical attacks in Europe.

According to the Wall Street Journal, in December 2002 an alleged terrorist who had been captured by the U.S. in March 2002 said under interrogation that Abu Atiya had dispatched nine men of North African descent to Europe in 2001 to prepare attacks. Doubt has been raised over the testimony of the interrogee in question, Abu Zubaydah, due to the extensive torture to which he was subject. It is not clear how, if at all, Abu Zubaydah knew about Abu Atiya prior to Abu Zubaydah's arrest: they trained at camps at opposite ends of Afghanistan, and Abu Zubaydah was not reported to have been close to Al-Zarqawi.

Nonetheless, three men named by Abu Zubaydah as having been commissioned by Abu Atiya were among several arrested in France that same month, and subsequently convicted in the Chechen Network case. British officials reportedly believed that the men arrested in January 2003 over the so-called Wood Green ricin plot were acting under orders from Abu Atiya, but no evidence subsequently emerged to support that allegation, and all but one of the men were wholly acquitted.

A September 2004 internal report produced by Germany's Federal Criminal Police Office recorded that an alleged Al-Zarqawi associate named "Rashi Zuhayr", apprehended by an unidentified agency while crossing an unidentified border, claimed to be on a mission at the request of Abu Atiya. Zuhayr reportedly claimed to have been sent to the United Kingdom to identify targets for terrorist attack. No public information has subsequently emerged concerning the alleged source of the claim. (Unlike Rashid, Rashi is not a Muslim or Arab name.) The journalist to whom the report was leaked warned in his write-up that "not all of the sources on which the compendium is based have the reputation of strictly following the rules of the law when carrying out investigations."

Under Russian and U.S. pressure, Georgia moved to expel the rebels from the Pankisi Gorge, and they began to leave in September 2002, but some remained behind. Powell claimed in his presentation to the United Nations Security Council on 5 February 2003 that associates of the Al-Qaeda leader Musab al-Zarqawi had

been active in the Pankisi Gorge, Georgia and in Chechnya, Russia. The plotting to which they are linked is not mere chatter. Members of Zarqawi's network say their goal was to kill Russians with toxins.

Powell showed a slide that depicted a purported Al-Qaeda network under the command of al-Zarqawi, including a bearded man named Abu 'Atiya located in Pankisi, Georgia. Also depicted on the slide were three other Jordanians who either grew up, like Zarqawi, in the city of Zarqa, or who were related to him: Abu Taisir, Abu Hafs al-Urduni, and Abu Ashraf. Two Algerian jihadists arrested in France in December 2002 were also named: Menad Benchellali and Merouane Benahmed. The slide also featured an unidentified detained "Al-Qaeda operative", perhaps meant to represent Abu Zubaydah. At the time, Al-Zarqawi was yet to formally join Al-Qaeda.

A group of some 50 militants remained in Pankisi as of June 2003. According to one analyst, while in Pankisi, Abu Atiya developed a "special rapport" with Saïd Arif, an Algerian jihadist. Abu Atiya later told Human Rights Watch that he "didn’t have much to do" with the men who had come from Europe to the camp, and had never confessed to involvement in any plot to carry out attacks in Europe, contrary to court documents filed in France.

Contrary to allegations widespread during 2003-2005, no ricin was ever found in Europe. However, Arif and a number of others were convicted in France in 2006 alongside Menad Benchellali, who had also been present in Pankisi, and who was accused of having planned to manufacture ricin in preparation for an attack in France. The prosecution was known as the Chechen Network case.

== Arrest in Azerbaijan and imprisonment in Jordan ==
It is not clear when Abu Atiya left Pankisi, but he was reportedly arrested in Baku, Azerbaijan on 12 August 2003. He was deported to Jordan late that September, and was remanded to the custody of Jordan's General Intelligence Department (GID).

Abu Atiya's purported confession to GID officers was used to convict Arif, Benchellali and others in the 2006 Chechen Network case. Atiya later told Human Rights Watch in 2007, while still in custody, that he had been given unidentified pills and injections during his interrogations in Jordan, had been subject to sleep deprivation, and hadn't been allowed to read his official confession before he signed it.

His interrogation during this time was also the source of claims that French jihadists in Chechnya had acquired two surface-to-air missiles, and planned to use them in an attack within France. Abu Atiya was released from GID custody on 30 December 2007, having never been formally charged.

== Names ==
The name Abu Atiya has the form of a kunya, an Arabic teknonym in which men are referred to as "father of" (Abu) their oldest child, or oldest male child, if they had one. Arab nicknames and noms de guerre often use the kunya form, as do a number of real family names.

When Abu Atiya identified himself to Human Rights Watch researchers in 2008, he reportedly gave his name as Adnan Muhammad Sadiq Abu Najila. Abu Najila in this case appears to be a family name, rather than a kunya indicating that his eldest child was a girl named Najila. German criminal investigators had previously identified him in 2005 as Adnan Sadiq Muhammad Abu Injila.
