= Abu Musab al-Zarqawi =

Jordanian jihadist (1966–2006)

- أبو مصعب الزرقاوي
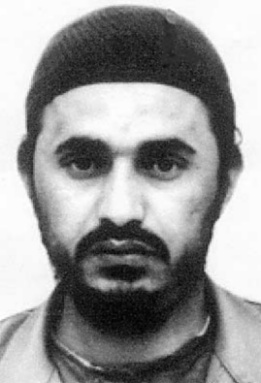
- Undated photo of al-Zarqawi

1st Emir of Al-Qaeda in Iraq
- In office October 17, 2004 – June 7, 2006
- Preceded by: Position established
- Succeeded by: Abu Ayyub al-Masri

Emir of Jama'at al-Tawhid wal-Jihad
- In office 1999 – October 17, 2004
- Preceded by: Position established
- Succeeded by: Merger with Al-Qaeda

1st Emir of the Mujahideen Shura Council
- In office January 15, 2006 – June 7, 2006
- Preceded by: Position created
- Succeeded by: Abu Ayyub al-Masri

Personal details
- Born: Ahmad Fadeel Nazal al-Khalayleh; October 20, 1966 or October 30, 1966 Zarqa, Jordan
- Died: June 7, 2006 (aged 39) Hibhib, Iraq
- Cause of death: Airstrike
- Children: 5

Military service
- Years of service: 1989–2006
- Rank: Commander
- Battles/wars: Soviet–Afghan War; United States invasion of Afghanistan; Iraq War X

Abu Musab al-Zarqawi (Note: English pronunciation; Arabic: أبو مصعب الزرقاوي, romanized: Abū Muṣ‘ab az-Zarqāwī, "Father of Musab, of Zarqa")) (October 30, 1966 – June 7, 2006), born Ahmad Fadeel Nazal al-Khalayleh, (Note: Arabic: أحمد فضيل نزال الخلايلة, romanized: Aḥmad Faḍīl Nazāl al-Khalāyla) was a Jordanian militant and founder of Al-Qaeda in Iraq, which later evolved to the Islamic State. He became known after masterminding a series of bombings, beheadings, and other attacks during the Iraq War, reportedly turning an insurgency against U.S. troops in Iraq into a Shia–Sunni civil war. He was sometimes known by his supporters as the "Sheikh of slaughtering".

He formed Jama'at al-Tawhid wal-Jihad (JTJ) in 1999, and led it until his death in 2006. al-Zarqawi took responsibility, on several audio and video recordings, for numerous acts of violence in Iraq including suicide bombings and hostage executions. Al-Zarqawi opposed the presence of Western military forces in the Islamic world, as well as Western support for Israel. In 2004, he joined al-Qaeda, and pledged allegiance to its leader Osama bin Laden. After this, JTJ became known as al-Qaeda in Iraq (AQI), which al-Zarqawi was named emir of.

In 2005, he declared war on Shias in Iraq, after the Iraqi government offensive on insurgents in the Sunni town of Tal Afar. He dispatched numerous suicide bombers throughout Iraq to attack American soldiers and areas with large concentrations of Shia militias. He is also thought to be responsible for the 2005 bombing of three hotels in Amman, Jordan. Al-Zarqawi died in a targeted killing by a joint U.S. force in 2006, while attending a meeting in an isolated safehouse in Hibhib, Iraq.

== Early life and family ==
Ahmad Fadeel al-Nazal al-Khalayleh (Arabic: أحمد فضيل النزال الخلايلة Aḥmad Faḍīl Nazāl al-Khalāyla), is believed to have been al-Zarqawi's real name. He was born to a poor Jordanian family of Palestinian descent in 1966. Raised in Zarqa, an industrial town located 27 kilometers (17 mi) north of Amman, with seven sisters and two brothers, and of Bedouin background, his father has been described as either a retired army officer or a practitioner of traditional medicine. After his father's death, al-Zarqawi became a street criminal, known for terrorizing and fighting others, and his heavy drinking. Al-Zarqawi has been described as a high school dropout, petty criminal, and a procurer of prostitutes.

Saif al-Adel claimed: "Abu Musab was a sturdy man who was not really very good at words. He expressed himself spontaneously and briefly. He would not compromise any of his beliefs."

Three of al-Zarqawi's seven sisters were married to figures connected to jihadist militancy. One was married to Abu Qudama Salih al-Hami, a Jordanian-Palestinian journalist close to the influential Palestinian militant Abdullah Yusuf Azzam. A second married the Jordanian-Palestinian militant Khalid al-Aruri, "one of al-Zarqawi's closest lieutenants in Afghanistan", another married Afghan mujahideen veteran Haytham Mustafa Obeidat. The third married a veteran jihadist militant from Jordan, Iyad Nazmi Salih Khalil.

Al-Zarqawi's first wife, Umm Mohammed, was a Jordanian woman who was around 40 years old when al-Zarqawi died in June 2006. She lived in Zarqa along with their four children, including a seven-year-old son, Musab. She had advised al-Zarqawi to leave Iraq temporarily and give orders to his deputies from outside the country. "He gave me an angry look and said, 'Me, me? I can't betray my religion and get out of Iraq. In the Name of Allah, I will not leave Iraq until victory or martyrdom'," she said of al-Zarqawi.

Al-Zarqawi's second wife, Isra, was 14 years old when he married her. She was the daughter of Yassin Jarrad, a Palestinian Islamic militant, who is blamed for the killing in 2003 of Ayatollah Muhammad Baqir al-Hakim, the Iraqi Shia leader. Her brother, Mohammad Jarad, was also a militant, who died in his 20s in 2013 while fighting for the Al-Nusra Front in Syria. They had a child when she was 15, and was killed along with al-Zarqawi and their child.

Al-Zarqawi's third wife was an Iraqi who might have died in the airstrike that killed al-Zarqawi. He is also said to have married a woman from a tribe around Peshawar, Pakistan.

== Militancy ==
=== 1989–1998: Afghanistan War, returning to Jordan, time in prison ===
In the late 1980s, al-Zarqawi went to Afghanistan to join the mujahideen who were fighting the invading Soviet troops. He was recruited by Abu Qutaibah al Majali to fight in Afghanistan. He arrived there in 1989, as the Soviets were already leaving. Instead of fighting, he became a reporter for an Islamist newsletter called Al-Bonian al-Marsous.

On the other hand, Ahmed Hashim says that he did fight in the battles of Khost and Gardez, while the magazine, which translates as The Solid Edifice in English, was published in both Arabic and Urdu from the Hayatabad suburb of Peshawar, where he also met his future spiritual mentor, the influential Salafi jihadi ideologue Abu Muhammad al-Maqdisi, in 1990.

Ultimately, al-Zarqawi lived in Pakistan for some 10 years, mainly in and around Peshawar, and eventually became fluent in Pashto.

According to The Washington Institute for Near East Policy, "Zarqawi's criminal past and extreme views on takfir (accusing another Muslim of heresy and thereby justifying his killing) created major friction and distrust with [Osama] bin Laden when the two first met in Afghanistan in 1999."

He was arrested in Jordan after guns and explosives were found in his home and sent to prison in 1992. In prison, he attempted to draft his cellmates into joining him to overthrow the rulers of Jordan, a former prison mate told Time magazine in 2004.

According to Jordanian officials and acquaintances, al-Zarqawi developed a reputation as a cellblock enforcer and adopted more radical Islamic beliefs.

In prison, due to his charisma and stature, he eventually became a sort of leader, issuing fatwas (religious edicts) and calling himself sheikh, while he also memorized the entire Quran. While he showed a hardliner side to his fellow inmates, physically punishing them if they went against Islamic principles (such as watching television with "uncovered women"), and piling stones inside buckets for weightlifting in order to appear more menacing, to his mother and sisters he showed a softer side, sending them letters full of affection and containing drawings, including drawings of roses.

According the Jordanian journalist Fouad Hussein, who was in jail with al-Zarqawi, it was not the Afghan mujahideen, but his prison years (which included eight and a half months in solitary confinement) that radicalized al-Zarqawi: "The prison left a clear mark on al-Zarqawi's personality, which grew more intense. In his opinion, policemen, judges, and government members of all ranks were supporters of the regimes, which he believed were tawagheet [tyrants] who should be fought." He also worked on his physical training.

=== 1999–2000: Training of Jihadists ===
In 1999, al-Zarqawi was released from prison in a general amnesty by Jordan's King Abdullah. Within months after his release, according to Jordanian officials, al-Zarqawi tried to resurrect his Jund al-Sham. Then, also according to Jordanian officials, he was involved in the millennium plot—a bid to bomb the Radisson SAS Hotel in Amman before New Year's Day 2000. The plot was discovered, and al-Zarqawi fled to Pakistan.

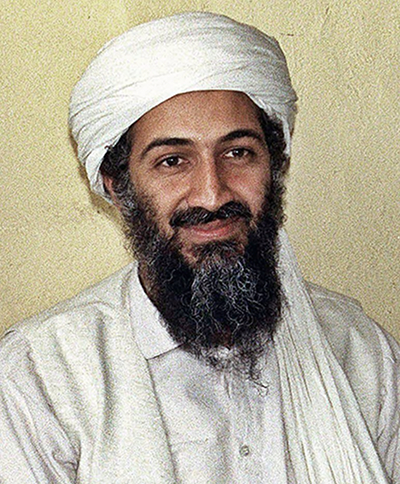
Osama bin Laden

When Pakistan revoked his visa, he crossed into Afghanistan, where he met, still according to Jordanian officials and also German court testimony, with Osama bin Laden and other al-Qaeda leaders in Kandahar and Kabul. He asked them for assistance and money to set up his own training camp in Herat. With some "small seed money" of $200,000 from bin Laden, the camp opened soon and attracted Jordanian militants. Al-Zarqawi selected Herat, far from al-Qaeda's established operations in Kandahar and Jalalabad, because his recruits would enter Afghanistan through Iran.

That camp was either for his group Jund al-Sham—as one, indirect, source contended—or for his newly started group Jama'at al-Tawhid wal-Jihad—as the Washington Institute for Near East Policy claimed—or he started one or two camps for both of those groups in Herat in 1999. It is also possible that al-Zarqawi set up only one camp for only one group known by those two different names in 1999. al-Zarqawi's training camp in Herat was reportedly specialized in poisons (especially ricin) and explosives.

=== 2001-2002: Alleged plots to attack Europe ===
In 2001, al-Zarqawi allegedly dispatched his subordinate Abu Atiya from Herat to the Pankisi Gorge, Georgia. At the time, Pankisi was a stronghold of two intertwined groups: Chechen separatist rebels and transnational jihadist militants, both seeking respite from the Second Chechen War, and relying on the Georgian government's unwillingness to evict them by force. Atiya was publicly accused by Colin Powell during his February 5, 2003 UN Security Council presentation of having instigated, at al-Zarqawi's direction, a number of plots to conduct terrorist attacks in Europe using the nerve agent ricin, among other weapons.

Depicted on a slide used by Powell, alongside al-Zarqawi and Atiya were three Jordanians who had grown up in the same town as al-Zarqawi: Abu Ashraf, Abu Taisir, and Abu Hafs al-Urduni. Two other men depicted on the slide, Menad Benchellali and Merouane Benahmed, were arrested in December 2002 in France, and ultimately convicted of plotting terrorist attacks as part of the Chechen Network case (so called due to the men's links to the Chechen jihadism, through Pankisi). However, contrary to claims made at the time, no ricin was ever found in Europe. Atiya was also linked in press reports to the so-called Wood Green ricin plot, but no substantive link was ever proven. Atiya later denied that he had been part of planning terrorist attacks in Europe.

=== 2001: Resistance to U.S. invasion of Afghanistan ===
In early September 2001, al-Zarqawi was in Iran during the September 11 attacks in the U.S..

After the October 2001 U.S.-led invasion of Afghanistan, al-Zarqawi returned to Afghanistan to help repel the assault by western allied forces, joining with Taliban and al-Qaeda fighters. He either suffered cracked ribs following the collapse of a bombed house or, according to a Jordanian intelligence source, was wounded in the chest during a firefight, in late 2001.

In 2001-2002, al-Zarqawi activated the Abu Ali group, a Palestinian Islamist cell based in Essen, Germany, providing logistical support and later orchestrating plans to attack Jewish targets in Germany. Following the interception of phone calls between al-Zarqawi and the cell's leader, Mohammed Abu Dhess, German authorities arrested the group in 2002.

He fled to Iran in December 2001 or January 5, 2002, and received medical treatment in Mashhad. The Iranian government reportedly refused Jordanian requests to extradite al-Zarqawi. Circumstantial evidence suggests that Iranian authorities may have restricted al-Zarqawi's activities to some extent.

=== 2002: Involvement in the assassination of Laurence Foley ===
The U.S. government contended (in 2003 in a U.N. speech) that al-Zarqawi received medical treatment in Baghdad, Iraq, from March until May 2002. About that time, Jordanian authorities asked Iraqi president Saddam Hussein to extradite al-Zarqawi for his suspected role in the millennium plot of 1999 (see above).

By, and during the summer of 2002, al-Zarqawi's location and activities appear in reports that conflict with one another. Jordanian court documents alleged that al-Zarqawi, during the summer of 2002, began training a band of fighters at a base in Syria, which on October 28, 2002, shot and killed Laurence Foley, a U.S. senior administrator of USAID in Amman. Unidentified Arab intelligence sources in 2004 claimed that al-Zarqawi was still in Syria late in 2002 and when the U.S. and Jordan requested his extradition from Syria, Syria ignored the request. However, the U.S. would actually claim that al-Zarqawi was in Baghdad from May until late November 2002 in the 2006 Senate Report on Pre-war Intelligence on Iraq, until later fleeing to Iran and northeastern Iraq.

=== 2003–2006: Terrorist activities in and around Iraq ===
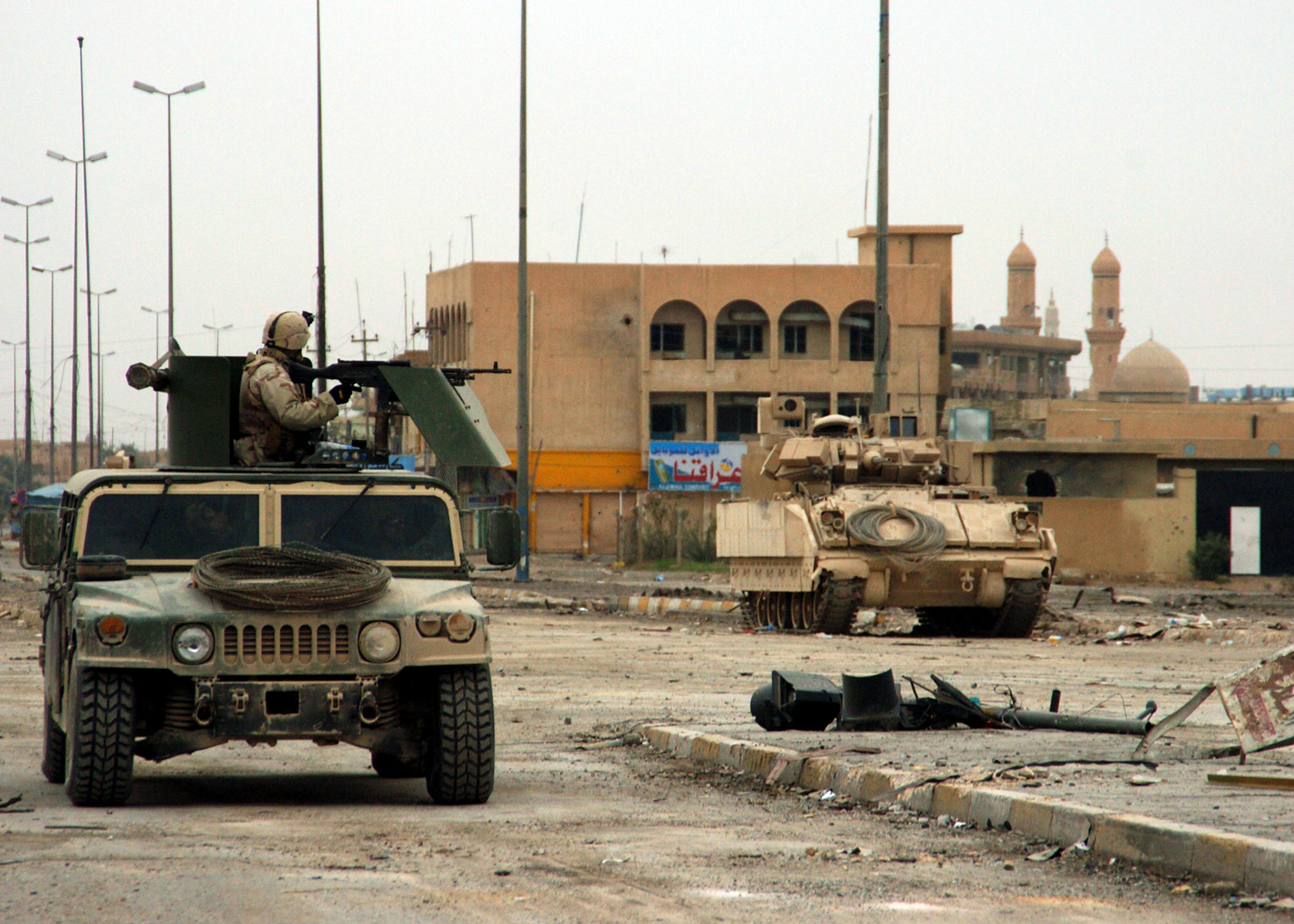
U.S. soldiers in Fallujah in November 2004 pursuing al-Zarqawi's network

In February 2003, according to Arab intelligence sources, al-Zarqawi in eastern Iran planned military resistance to the expected U.S. invasion of Iraq. And, by March 2003, according to British intelligence, al-Zarqawi's network had set up sleeper cells in Baghdad to resist an expected U.S. occupation.

Prior to the U.S.-led invasion of Iraq in March 2003, Special Activities Division (SAD) and the Army's 10th Special Forces Group entered Iraq and cooperated with Patriotic Union of Kurdistan Peshmerga to attack Ansar al-Islam. Together they launched Operation Viking Hammer in March 2003 which dealt a huge blow to the terrorist group which resulted in the deaths of a substantial number of terrorists and the uncovering of a chemical weapons facility at Sargat. Sargat was the only facility of its type discovered in Iraq.

From 2003 to 2006, JTJ, and then al-Qaeda in Iraq, committed of dozens of violent and deadly attacks in Iraq, which had fallen into chaos and anarchy after the invasion of Iraq. Some of these attacks al-Zarqawi indeed claimed responsibility for, as well as for some attacks in Morocco, Turkey, and Jordan, and some foiled attacks in Turkey and Jordan (see below).

Al-Zarqawi targeted Shia mosques as well as civilians, UN representatives, Iraqi government institutions, Egypt's ambassador, Russian diplomats and foreign civilians in Iraq and hotel visitors in Jordan, possibly also Christian churches, the Jordanian embassy, and the U.S.-led Multi-National Force in Iraq, most of whom he professedly hated either as apostates of Islam, or as "infidels" "giving Palestine to the Jews", or as individuals oppressing and "humiliating our [Islamic] people" or "nation". Al-Zarqawi was part of the leadership of Ansar al-Islam and was believed to have fled into Iran during the assault.

=== U.S. chasing al-Zarqawi, 2003–2006 ===
On December 17, 2004, the U.S. State Department added al-Zarqawi and JTJ to its list of Foreign Terrorist Organizations, and ordered a freeze on any assets that the group might have in the U.S.

By May 2005, al-Zarqawi was the most wanted man in Jordan and Iraq, had claimed scores of attacks in Iraq against Iraqis and foreigners, and was blamed for perhaps even more. The U.S. government then offered a $25m reward for information leading to his capture, the same amount offered for the capture of bin Laden before March 2004.

On February 24, 2006, the FBI also added al-Zarqawi to the "Seeking Information – War on Terrorism" list, the first time that he had ever been added to any of the FBI's three major "wanted" lists.

== Attacks ==
=== Attacks outside Iraq ===
According to Jordanian officials, in 1999, al-Zarqawi became involved in a plot to blow up the Amman Radisson hotel, where many Israeli and American tourists lodged, before New Year's Day 2000. He failed in this attempt, and fled to Afghanistan, then entered Iraq via Iran after the overthrow of the Taliban in late 2001.

From Iraq, he started his terrorist campaign by hiring men to kill Laurence Foley who was a senior U.S. diplomat working for the U.S. Agency for International Development in Jordan. On October 28, 2002, Foley was assassinated outside his home in Amman. Under interrogation by Jordanian authorities, two suspects confessed that they had been armed and paid by al-Zarqawi to perform the assassination. U.S. officials believe that the planning and execution of the Foley assassination was led by members of Afghan Jihad, the International Mujaheddin Movement, and al-Qaeda. One of the leaders, Salim Sa'd Salim Bin-Suwayd, was paid over $50,000 for his work in planning assassinations in Jordan against U.S., Israeli, and Jordanian government officials. Suwayd was arrested in Jordan for the murder of Foley. Al-Zarqawi was again sentenced in absentia in Jordan; this time, as before, his sentence was death.

Al-Zarqawi was named as the organizer of a series of deadly bomb attacks in Casablanca and Istanbul in 2003. U.S. officials believe that al-Zarqawi trained others in the use of poison (ricin) for possible attacks in Europe. al-Zarqawi had also planned to attack a NATO summit in June 2004. According to suspects arrested in Turkey, al-Zarqawi sent them to Istanbul to organize an attack on a NATO summit there on June 28 or 29. On April 26, 2004, Jordanian authorities announced they had broken up an al-Qaeda plot to use chemical weapons in Amman. Among the targets were the U.S. Embassy, the Jordanian prime minister's office and the headquarters of Jordanian intelligence. In a series of raids, the Jordanians seized 20 tons of chemicals, including blistering agents, nerve gas and numerous explosives. Also seized were three trucks equipped with specially modified plows, apparently designed to crash through security barricades. Jordanian state television aired a videotape of four men admitting they were part of the plot. One of them, Azmi Al-Jayousi, said that he was acting on the orders of al-Zarqawi, and that he obtained training in chemical weapons. However, Al-Jayousi would later retract his confession stating that it was obtained via duress. Al-Zarqawi would admit that an attack was planned, but would deny the use of chemical weapons referring to such claims as fabrications by the Jordanian government. Likewise, independent and U.S. investigators were skeptical of Jordanian claims of a chemical weapons attack. Furthermore, many experts and observers suspected that the Jordanian government exaggerated the details of the plot on purpose for political gain. On February 15, 2006, Jordan's High Court of Security sentenced nine men, including al-Zarqawi, to death for their involvement in the plot. al-Zarqawi was convicted of planning the entire attack from his post in Iraq, funding the operation with nearly $120,000, and sending a group of Jordanians into Jordan to execute the plan. Eight of the defendants were accused of belonging to a previously unknown group, "Kata'eb al-Tawhid" or Battalions of Monotheism, which was headed by al-Zarqawi and linked to al-Qaeda.

The November 2005 Amman bombings that killed sixty people in three hotels, including several officials of the Palestinian Authority and members of a Chinese defense delegation, were claimed by al-Zarqawi's group, al-Qaeda in Iraq.

=== Attacks inside Iraq ===
Stephen Hayes wrote for The Weekly Standard in March 2003, that recent British Intelligence reporting suggested that before the invasion of Iraq, al-Zarqawi ran a "terrorist haven" in Kurdish northern Iraq, and that al-Zarqawi had set up sleeper cells in Baghdad "to be activated during a U.S. occupation of the city". These cells were claimed to be intent on attacking U.S. targets using car bombs and other means, Hayes wrote that "al Qaeda-associated terrorists continued to arrive in Baghdad in early March." Later on, it was discovered that some reporting by Hayes had been incorrect—among them was al-Zarqawi's prosthetic limb. When al-Zarqawi was killed, it was evident he did not have a prosthetic limb. The anti-war movement accused Hayes of having invented stories, and terrorism analyst Loretta Napoleani argued that the importance of al-Zarqawi was built on incomplete Kurdish intelligence and then fomented by the U.S. to make him the new face of al-Qaeda.

American hostage Nick Berg seated, with five men standing over him. The man directly behind him, alleged to be al-Zarqawi, is the one who beheaded Berg.

In May 2004, a video appeared on an alleged al-Qaeda website showing a group of five men, their faces covered with keffiyeh or balaclavas, beheading American civilian Nicholas Berg, who had been abducted and taken hostage in Iraq weeks earlier. The CIA confirmed that the speaker on the tape wielding the knife that killed Berg was al-Zarqawi. The video opens with the title "Abu Musab al-Zarqawi slaughters an American". The speaker states that the murder was in retaliation for U.S. abuses at the Abu Ghraib prison. Following al-Zarqawi's death, Nicholas' father, and long-time anti-war activist Michael Berg stated that al-Zarqawi's killing would lead to further vengeance and was not a cause for rejoicing. The CIA also confirmed that al-Zarqawi personally beheaded another American civilian, Olin Eugene Armstrong, in September 2004.

U.S. officials implicated al-Zarqawi in over 700 killings in Iraq during the invasion, mostly from bombings. Since March 2004, that number rose into the thousands. According to the United States State Department, al-Zarqawi was responsible for the Canal Hotel bombing of the United Nations Headquarters in Iraq on August 19, 2003. This attack killed twenty-two people, including the UN Secretary General's special Iraqi envoy Sergio Vieira de Mello. Al-Zarqawi's biggest alleged atrocities in Iraq included the attacks on the Shia shrines in Karbala and Baghdad in March 2004, which killed over 180 people, and the car bomb attacks in Najaf and Karbala in December 2004, which claimed over 60 lives. Al-Zarqawi is believed by the former Coalition Provisional Authority in Iraq to have written an intercepted letter to the al-Qaeda leadership in February 2004 on the progress of the "Iraqi jihad". However, al-Qaeda denied they had written the letter. The U.S. military believes al-Zarqawi organized the February 2006 attack on the Al Askari Mosque in Samarra, in an attempt to trigger sectarian violence between Sunnis and Shias in Iraq.

In a January 2005 internet recording, al-Zarqawi condemned democracy as "the big American lie" and said participants in Iraq's January 30 election were enemies of Islam, in turn, he called for a boycott of the elections and was violent towards those who didn't support or participate in the boycott. al-Zarqawi stated "We have declared a bitter war against democracy and all those who seek to enact it... Democracy is also based on the right to choose your religion [and that is] against the rule of Allah."

On April 25, 2006, a video appearing to show al-Zarqawi surfaced. In the tape, the man says holy warriors are fighting on despite a three-year "crusade". U.S. experts believed the recording was genuine. One part of the recording shows a man—who bears a strong resemblance to previous pictures of al-Zarqawi—sitting on the floor and addressing a group of masked men with an automatic rifle at his side. "Your mujahideen sons were able to confront the most ferocious of crusader campaigns on a Muslim state," the man says. Addressing U.S. president George W. Bush, he says: "Why don't you tell people that your soldiers are committing suicide, taking drugs and hallucination pills to help them sleep?" "By God", he says, "your dreams will be defeated by our blood and by our bodies. What is coming is even worse." The speaker in the video also reproaches the U.S. for its "arrogance and insolence" in rejecting a truce offered by "our prince and leader", bin Laden. The U.S. Army aired an unedited tape of al-Zarqawi in May 2006 highlighting the fact that he did not know how to clear a stoppage on the stolen M249 Squad Automatic Weapon he was using.

=== Attempts to provoke U.S. attack on Iran ===
A document found in al-Zarqawi's safe house indicates that the group was trying to provoke the U.S. to attack Iran in order to reinvigorate the insurgency in Iraq and to weaken American forces in Iraq. "The question remains, how to draw the Americans into fighting a war against Iran? It is not known whether America is serious in its animosity towards Iran, because of the big support Iran is offering to America in its war in Afghanistan and in Iraq. Hence, it is necessary first to exaggerate the Iranian danger and to convince America, and the West in general, of the real danger coming from Iran..." The document then outlines six ways to incite war between the two nations. Some experts questioned the authenticity of the document.

== Links to al-Qaeda ==
After the 2001 war in Afghanistan, al-Zarqawi appeared on a U.S. list of most-wanted al-Qaeda terrorists still at large in early 2002. He formally swore loyalty (Bay'ah) to bin Laden in October 2004, and was in turn appointed bin Laden's deputy. Al-Zarqawi then reformed JTJ into AQI.

=== Pre-U.S. invasion of Iraq ===
Before the invasion of Afghanistan, JTJ had some connections to al-Qaeda. In an interview on Al-Majd TV, former al-Qaeda member Walid Khan, who was in Afghanistan fighting alongside al-Zarqawi's group explained that from the day al-Zarqawi's group arrived, there were disagreements, differences of opinion with bin Laden. Saif al-Adel, later bin Laden's military chief and an Egyptian who attempted to overthrow the Egyptian government, saw merit in al-Zarqawi's overall objective of overthrowing the Jordanian monarchy. He intervened and smoothed the relations between al-Zarqawi and al-Qaeda leadership. It was agreed that al-Zarqawi would be given the funds to start up his training camp outside the Afghan city of Herat, near the Iranian border.

Al-Zarqawi's group continued to receive funding from bin Laden and pursued "a largely distinct, if occasionally overlapping agenda", according to The Washington Post. Counterterrorism experts told The Washington Post that while al-Zarqawi accepted al-Qaeda's financial help to set up a training camp in Afghanistan he ran it independently and while bin Laden was planning September 11, al-Zarqawi was busy developing a plot to topple the Jordanian monarchy and attack Israel.

German Intelligence wiretaps found that in autumn 2001, al-Zarqawi grew angry when his members were raising money in Germany for al-Qaeda's local leadership. According to a recorded conversation that was played at a trial of four alleged al-Zarqawi operatives in Düsseldorf, al-Zarqawi told one of his followers that "if something should come from their side, simply do not accept it".

In 2001, bin Laden repeatedly summoned al-Zarqawi from Herat to Kandahar, asking that he take an oath of allegiance to him. Al-Zarqawi refused; he didn't want to take sides against the Northern Alliance and doubted the fervor of bin Laden and the Taliban. When the U.S. began its invasion of Afghanistan on October 7, 2001, al-Zarqawi joined forces with al-Qaeda and the Taliban for the first time. He and his Jund al-Sham fought in and around Herat and Kandahar. When al-Zarqawi finally did take the oath in October 2004, it was after eight months of negotiations.

When Shadi Abdellah was arrested in 2002, he cooperated with authorities, but suggested that al-Zarqawi and Osama bin Laden were not as closely linked as previously believed, in large part because al-Zarqawi disagreed with many of the sentiments put forward by Mahfouz Ould al-Walid for al-Qaeda.

In April 2007, former Director of Central Intelligence George Tenet revealed that in July 2001, an associate of al-Zarqawi had been detained and, during interrogations, linked al-Zarqawi with al-Qaeda operative Abu Zubaydah. Tenet also wrote in his book that Thirwat Shehata and Yussef Dardiri, "assessed by a senior al-Qaeda detainee to be among the Egyptian Islamic Jihad's best operational planners", arrived in Baghdad in May 2002 and were engaged in "sending recruits to train in al-Zarqawi's camps".

=== Post-U.S. invasion of Iraq ===
During or shortly before the invasion of Iraq in March 2003, al-Zarqawi returned to Iraq, where he met with bin Laden's military chief, Saif al-Adel, who asked him to coordinate the entry of al-Qaeda operatives into Iraq through Syria. Al-Zarqawi readily agreed and by the fall of 2003 a steady flow of Arab Islamists were infiltrating Iraq via Syria. Although many of these foreign fighters were not members of JTJ, they became more or less dependent on al-Zarqawi's local contacts once they entered the unfamiliar country. Moreover, given JTJ's superior intelligence gathering capability, it made little sense for non-JTJ operatives to plan and carry out attacks without coordinating with al-Zarqawi's lieutenants. Consequentially, al-Zarqawi came to be recognized as the regional "emir" of Islamist terrorists in Iraq without having sworn fealty to bin Laden.

U.S. intelligence intercepted a January 2004 letter from al-Zarqawi to al Qaeda and American officials made it public in February 2004. In the letter to bin Laden, al-Zarqawi wrote:

You, gracious brothers, are the leaders, guides, and symbolic figures of jihad and battle. We do not see ourselves as fit to challenge you, and we have never striven to achieve glory for ourselves. All that we hope is that we will be the spearhead, the enabling vanguard, and the bridge on which the Islamic nation crosses over to the victory that is promised and the tomorrow to which we aspire. This is our vision, and we have explained it. This is our path, and we have made it clear. If you agree with us on it, if you adopt it as a program and road, and if you are convinced of the idea of fighting the sects of apostasy, we will be your readied soldiers, working under your banner, complying with your orders, and indeed swearing fealty to you publicly and in the news media, vexing the infidels and gladdening those who preach the oneness of God. On that day, the believers will rejoice in God's victory. If things appear otherwise to you, we are brothers, and the disagreement will not spoil our friendship. This is a cause in which we are cooperating for the good and supporting jihad. Awaiting your response, may God preserve you as keys to good and reserves for Islam and its people.

In October 2004, a message on an Islamic Web site posted by a JTJ spokesman announced that al-Zarqawi had sworn JTJ's allegiance to bin Laden and al-Qaeda. The message stated:

Numerous messages were passed between 'Abu Musab' (Allah protect him) and the al-Qaeda brotherhood over the past eight months, establishing a dialogue between them. No sooner had the calls been cut off than Allah chose to restore them, and our most generous brothers in al-Qaeda came to understand the strategy of the Tawhid wal-Jihad organization in Iraq, the land of the two rivers and of the Caliphs, and their hearts warmed to its methods and overall mission. Let it be known that al-Tawhid wal-Jihad pledges both its leaders and its soldiers to the mujahid commander, Sheikh 'Osama bin Laden' (in word and in deed) and to jihad for the sake of Allah until there is no more discord [among the ranks of Islam] and all of the religion turns toward Allah... By Allah, O sheikh of the mujahideen, if you bid us plunge into the ocean, we would follow you. If you ordered it so, we would obey. If you forbade us something, we would abide by your wishes. For what a fine commander you are to the armies of Islam, against the inveterate infidels and apostates!

On December 27, 2004, Al Jazeera broadcast an audiotape of bin Laden calling al-Zarqawi "the prince of al-Qaeda in Iraq" and asked "all our organization brethren to listen to him and obey him in his good deeds."

In May 2007, George W. Bush declassified a U.S. intelligence report that stated that bin Laden had enlisted al-Zarqawi to plan strikes inside the U.S., and warned that in January 2005, bin Laden had assigned al-Zarqawi to organize a cell inside Iraq that would be used to plan and carry out attacks against the U.S. "Bin Laden tasked the terrorist al-Zarqawi ... with forming a cell to conduct terrorist attacks outside of Iraq," Bush stated in a commencement address at the Coast Guard Academy. "Bin Laden emphasized that America should be al-Zarqawi's No. 1 priority."

=== Terrorism experts' view on the alliance ===
Zarqawi gave al-Qaeda a highly visible presence in Iraq at a time when its original leaders went into hiding or were killed after the September 11 attacks in the United States. In turn, al-Qaeda leaders were able to brand a new franchise in Iraq and claim they were at the forefront of the fight to expel U.S. forces. But this relationship was proven to be fragile as al-Zarqawi angered al-Qaeda leaders by focusing attacks on Iraqi Shias more often than the U.S. military. In September 2005, U.S. intelligence officials said they had confiscated a long letter that al-Qaeda's deputy leader, Ayman al-Zawahiri, had written to al-Zarqawi, bluntly warning that Muslim public opinion was turning against him. According to terrorism analyst Paul Wilkinson: "A number of al-Qaeda figures were uncomfortable with the tactics he was using in Iraq ... It was quite clear with al-Zarqawi that as far as the al-Qaeda core leadership goes, they couldn't control the way in which their network affiliates operated."

=== U.S. officials' view of the alliance ===
In June 2004, U.S. Defense Secretary Donald Rumsfeld conceded that al-Zarqawi's ties to al-Qaeda may have been much more ambiguous—and that he may have been more of a rival than a lieutenant to bin Laden. Al-Zarqawi "may very well not have sworn allegiance to [bin Laden]", Rumsfeld said at a Pentagon briefing. "Maybe he disagrees with him on something, maybe because he wants to be 'The Man' himself and maybe for a reason that's not known to me." Rumsfeld added, "someone could legitimately say he's not al-Qaeda."

According to the Senate Report on Prewar Intelligence released in September 2006, "in April 2003, the CIA learned from a senior al-Qaeda detainee that al-Zarqawi had rebuffed several efforts by bin Ladin to recruit him. The detainee claimed that al-Zarqawi had religious differences with bin Ladin and disagreed with bin Laden's singular focus against the United States. The CIA assessed in April 2003 that al-Zarqawi planned and directed independent terrorist operations without al Qaeda direction, but assessed that he 'most likely contracts out his network's services to al-Qaeda in return for material and financial assistance from key al-Qaeda facilitators.'"

In the April 2006 National Intelligence Estimate, declassified in September 2006, it asserts, "Al-Qaeda, now merged with [al-Zarqawi's] network, is exploiting the situation in Iraq to attract new recruits and donors and to maintain its leadership role."

== Links to Saddam Hussein ==
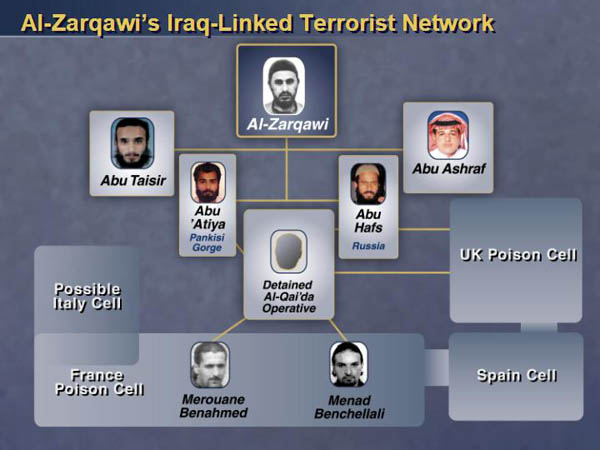
Colin Powell's U.N. presentation slide showing al-Zarqawi's global terrorist network

On February 5, 2003, then Secretary of State Colin Powell gave a speech to the United Nations Security Council. Regarding al-Zarqawi, Powell stated that:

Iraq today harbors a deadly terrorist network headed by Abu Musab al-Zarqawi, an associate and collaborator of Osama bin Laden and his Al Qaeda lieutenants. When our coalition ousted the Taliban, the [al-Zarqawi] network helped establish another poison and explosive training center camp. And this camp is located in northeastern Iraq. He traveled to Baghdad in May 2002 for medical treatment, staying in the capital of Iraq for two months while he recuperated to fight another day. During this stay, nearly two dozen extremists converged on Baghdad and established a base of operations there. These al-Qaeda affiliates, based in Baghdad, now coordinate the movement of people, money and supplies into and throughout Iraq for his network, and they've now been operating freely in the capital for more than eight months. We asked a friendly security service to approach Baghdad about extraditing [al-Zarqawi] and providing information about him and his close associates. This service contacted Iraqi officials twice, and we passed details that should have made it easy to find [al-Zarqawi]. The network remains in Baghdad.

Zarqawi recuperated in Baghdad after being wounded while fighting along with Taliban and al-Qaeda fighters in Afghanistan. According to the 2004 Senate Report of Pre-war Intelligence on Iraq, "A foreign government service asserted that the IIS (Iraqi Intelligence Service) knew where al-Zarqawi was located despite Baghdad's claims that it could not find him." The report also stated: "[The] Iraqi regime was, at a minimum, aware of al-Zarqawi's presence in Baghdad in 2002 because a foreign government service passed information regarding his whereabouts to Iraqi authorities in June 2002. Despite Iraq's pervasive security apparatus and its receipt of detailed information about al-Zarqawi's possible location, however, Iraqi Intelligence told the foreign government service it could not locate al-Zarqawi."

=== Jordanian analysis ===
A Jordanian security official stated that documents recovered after Saddam's overthrow show that Iraqi agents detained some of al-Zarqawi's operatives but released them after questioning. He also told The Washington Post that the Iraqis warned the al-Zarqawi operatives that the Jordanians knew where they were. The official stated: "'We sent many memos to Iraq during this time, asking them to identify his position, where he was, how he got weapons, how he smuggled them across the border,' but Hussein's government never responded."

This claim was reiterated by Jordanian King Abdullah II in an interview with Al-Hayat. Abdullah revealed that Saddam had rejected repeated requests from Jordan to hand over al-Zarqawi. According to Abdullah, "We had information that he entered Iraq from a neighboring country, where he lived and what he was doing. We informed the Iraqi authorities about all this detailed information we had, but they didn't respond." Abdullah told the Al-Hayat that Jordan exerted "big efforts" with Saddam's government to extradite al-Zarqawi, but added, "our demands that the former regime hand him over were in vain."

One high-level Jordanian intelligence official stated that al-Zarqawi, after leaving Afghanistan in December 2001, frequently traveled to the Sunni Triangle of Iraq where he expanded his network, recruited and trained new fighters, and set up bases, safe houses, and military training camps. He said, however, "We know al-Zarqawi better than he knows himself. And I can assure you that he never had any links to Saddam."

Counterterrorism scholar Loretta Napoleoni quotes former Jordanian parliamentarian Layth Shubaylat, a radical Islamist opposition figure, who was personally acquainted with both al-Zarqawi and Saddam:

First of all, I don't think the two ideologies go together, I'm sure the former Iraqi leadership saw no interest in contacting al-Zarqawi or al-Qaeda operatives. The mentality of al-Qaeda simply doesn't go with the Ba'athist one. When he was in prison in Jordan with Shubaylat, Abu Mos'ab wouldn't accept me, said Shubaylat, because I'm opposition, even if I'm a Muslim. How could he accept Saddam Hussein, a secular dictator?

=== U.S. conclusion ===
A CIA report in late 2004 concluded that there was no evidence Saddam's government was involved or even aware of this medical treatment, and found no conclusive evidence the regime had harbored al-Zarqawi. A U.S. official stated that the report was a mix of new information and a look at some older information and did not make any final judgments or come to any definitive conclusions. "To suggest the case is closed on this would not be correct," the official said. A U.S. official familiar with the report told Knight-Ridder, "what is indisputable is that al-Zarqawi was operating out of Baghdad and was involved in a lot of bad activities." Another U.S. official summarized the report as such: "The evidence is that Saddam never gave al-Zarqawi anything."

According to the 2004 Senate Report on Prewar Intelligence, "The CIA provided four reports detailing the debriefings of Abu [Zubaydah] ... Zubaydah said that he was not aware of a relationship between Iraq and al-Qaeda. He also said, however, that any relationship would be highly compartmented, and went on to name al-Qaeda members who he thought had good contacts with the Iraqis. For instance, Abu Zubaydah indicated that he had heard that [al-Zarqawi] and others had good relationships with Iraqi Intelligence."

A classified memo obtained by Stephen F. Hayes, prepared by Undersecretary of Defense for Policy Douglas Feith in response to questions posed by the Senate Intelligence Committee as part of its investigation into prewar intelligence, stated the following regarding al-Zarqawi:

Sensitive reporting indicates senior terrorist planner and close al-Qaeda associate al-Zarqawi has had an operational alliance with Iraqi officials. As of October 2002, al-Zarqawi maintained contacts with the IIS to procure weapons and explosives, including surface-to-air missiles from an IIS officer in Baghdad. According to sensitive reporting, al-Zarqawi was setting up sleeper cells in Baghdad to be activated in case of a U.S. occupation of the city, suggesting his operational cooperation with the Iraqis may have deepened in recent months. Such cooperation could include IIS provision of a secure operating bases [sic] and steady access to arms and explosives in preparation for a possible U.S. invasion. Al-Zarqawi's procurements from the Iraqis also could support al-Qaeda operations against the U.S. or its allies elsewhere.

The memo was a collection of raw intelligence reports and drew no conclusions. U.S. intelligence officials conveyed to Newsweek that the "reports [in the memo] were old, uncorroborated and came from sources of unknown if not dubious credibility".

The 2006 Senate Report on Prewar Intelligence concluded that al-Zarqawi was not a link between Saddam and al-Qaeda: "Postwar information indicates that Saddam Hussein attempted, unsuccessfully, to locate and capture al-Zarqawi and that the regime did not have a relationship with, harbor, or turn a blind eye toward al-Zarqawi." The report also cited the debriefing of a "high-ranking Iraqi official" by the FBI. The official stated that a foreign government requested in October 2002 that the IIS locate five individuals suspected of involvement in the murder of Laurence Foley, which led to the arrest of Abu Yasim Sayyem in early 2003. The official told the FBI that evidence of Sayyem's ties to al-Zarqawi was compelling, and thus, he was "shocked" when Sayemm was ordered released by Hussein. The official stated it "was ludicrous to think that the IIS had any involvement with al-Qaeda or al-Zarqawi," and suggested Hussein let Sayyem go because he "would participate in striking U.S. forces when they entered Iraq." In 2005, according to the Senate report, the CIA amended its 2004 report to conclude, "the regime did not have a relationship, harbor, or turn a blind eye toward al-Zarqawi and his associates." (pp. 91–92) An intelligence official familiar with the CIA assessment also told Michael Isikoff of Newsweek that the current draft of the report says that while al-Zarqawi did likely receive medical treatment in Baghdad in 2002, the report concludes, "most evidence suggests Saddam Hussein did not provide al-Zarqawi safe haven before the war, ... [but] it also recognizes that there are still unanswered questions and gaps in knowledge about the relationship."

A letter dated August 17, 2002, from an Iraqi intelligence official, is part of the Operation Iraqi Freedom documents; the letter asks agents in the country to be on the lookout for al-Zarqawi and another unnamed man. Pictures of both men were attached.

The letter issued the following 3 directives:

1. Instructing your sources to continue their surveillance of the above-mentioned individuals in your area of operations and inform us once you initiate such action.
2. Coordinate with Directorate 18 to verify the photographs of the above-mentioned with photos of the members of the Jordanian community within your area of operations.
3. Conduct a comprehensive survey of all tourist facilities (hotels, furnished apartments, and leased homes). Give this matter your utmost attention. Keep us informed.

The documents also contain responses to this request. One response, dated August 2002, states "Upon verifying the information through our sources and friends in the field as well as office (3), we found no information to confirm the presence of the above-mentioned in our area of operation. Please review, we suggest circulating the contents of this message." Another response, also dated August 2002, states "After closely examining the data and through our sources and friends in (SATTS: U R A) square, and in Al-Qa'im immigration office, and in Office (3), none of the mentioned individuals are documented to be present in our area of jurisdiction."

According to ABC News, "The letter seems to be coming from or going to Trebil, a town on the Iraqi-Jordanian border. Follow up on the presence of those subjects is ordered, as well as a comparison of their pictures with those of Jordanian subjects living in Iraq. (This may be referring to pictures of al-Zarqawi and another man on pp. 4–6.)"

In his book At the Center of the Storm, George Tenet writes:

... by the spring and summer of 2002, more than a dozen al-Qa'ida-affiliated extremists converged on Baghdad, with apparently no harassment on the part of the Iraqi government. They found a comfortable and secure environment in which they moved people and supplies to support Zarqawi's operations in northern Iraq.

According to Tenet, while al-Zarqawi did find a safe haven in Iraq and did supervise camps in northeastern Iraq run by the Kurdish group Ansar al-Islam, "the intelligence did not show any Iraqi authority, direction, or control over any of the many specific terrorist acts carried out by al-Qaeda."

== Debates over level of influence ==
How much influence al-Zarqawi had in Iraq and after his death is disputed.

=== Importance ===
Writing in 2015, an anonymous author in the New York Review of Books describes al-Zarqawi as having been responsible for "turning an insurgency against U.S. troops" in Iraq "into a Shia–Sunni civil war". The Washington Post's Joby Warrick argues that al-Zarqawi was the founder of "the group that became ISIS". Among other things, Warrick believes al-Zarqawi expanded the already broad "parameters of violence" in Iraq and the Middle East.

He personally beheaded civilians on video; directed suicide bombs at targets that other jihadis considered off limits like the UN, NGOs, and Arab embassies; and struck Shia religious targets with the ultimately successfully goal of provoking a destabilizing Sunni–Shia civil war. Even Al Qaeda thought he was going too far ... but al-Zarqawi's methods proved to have enduring traction long after his death in 2006.

While the U.S. Iraqi troop surge and "Awakening" movement left his movement "all but dead" in 2009, it survived and metastasized into ISIS according to author David Ignatius.

=== Doubts about his importance ===
Some months before and after his killing, several sources claimed that al-Zarqawi was variously an American "Boogeyman" and product of its war propaganda, the product of faulty U.S. intelligence, a U.S. or Israeli agent, did not really exist, was unlikely to be an important insurgent leader because he had no real leadership capabilities, and/or did not behead Nicholas Berg.

According to the Commonwealth Institute, his notoriety was the product of U.S. war propaganda designed to promote the image of a demonic enemy figure to help justify continued U.S. military operations in Iraq, perhaps with the tacit support of jihadi elements who wished to use him as a propaganda tool or as a distraction. In one report, conservative newspaper The Daily Telegraph described the claim that al-Zarqawi was the head of the "terrorist network" in Iraq as a "myth". This report cited an unnamed U.S. military intelligence source to the effect that the al-Zarqawi leadership "myth" was initially caused by faulty intelligence, but was later accepted because it suited U.S. government political goals. One Sunni insurgent leader claimed, "Zarqawi is an American, Israeli and Iranian agent who is trying to keep our country unstable so that the Sunnis will keep facing occupation."

On February 18, 2006, Shia cleric Muqtada al-Sadr made similar charges:

I believe he is fictitious. He is a knife or a pistol in the hands of the occupier. I believe that all three – the occupation, the takfir (i.e. the practice of declaring other Muslims to be apostates) supporters, and the Saddam supporters – stem from the same source, because the takfir supporters and the Saddam supporters are a weapon in the hands of America and it pins its crimes on them.

On April 10, 2006, The Washington Post reported that the U.S. military conducted a major propaganda offensive designed to exaggerate al-Zarqawi's role in the Iraqi insurgency. General Mark Kimmitt says of the propaganda campaign that there "was no attempt to manipulate the press". In an internal briefing, Kimmitt is quoted as stating, "The al-Zarqawi PSYOP Program is the most successful information campaign to date." The main goal of the propaganda campaign seems to have been to exacerbate a rift between insurgent forces in Iraq, but intelligence experts worried that it had actually enhanced al-Zarqawi's influence. Colonel Derek Harvey, who was one of the top officers handling Iraq intelligence issues for the Joint Chiefs of Staff, warned an Army meeting in 2004, "Our own focus on al-Zarqawi has enlarged his caricature, if you will – made him more important than he really is, in some ways." While Pentagon spokespersons state unequivocally that PSYOPs may not be used to influence American citizens, there is little question that the information disseminated through the program has found its way into American media sources. The Washington Post also notes, "One briefing slide about U.S. 'strategic communications' in Iraq, prepared for Army Gen. George W. Casey Jr., the top U.S. commander in Iraq, describes the 'home audience' as one of six major targets of the American side of the war."

On July 4, 2006, the U.S. ambassador to Baghdad Zalmay Khalilzad stated: "In terms of the level of violence, it (the death of al-Zarqawi) has not had any impact at this point... the level of violence is still quite high." But Khalilzad maintained his view that the killing had encouraged some insurgent groups to "reach out" and join government reconciliation talks; he believed that previously these groups were intimidated by al-Zarqawi's presence.

On June 8, 2006, the Respect Party MP George Galloway referred to al-Zarqawi as a "Boogeyman", built up by the Americans to try and perpetrate the lie that the resistance in Iraq are by foreigners, and that the mass of the Iraqis are with the American and British occupation". Jeffrey Gettleman of The New York Times supported this saying "several people who knew Mr. al-Zarqawi well, including former cellmates, voiced doubts about his ability to be an insurgent leader, or the leader of anything." In the July/August 2006 issue of The Atlantic, Mary Anne Weaver doubted that the figure who beheaded Nicholas Berg in the execution video was in fact al-Zarqawi.

In a story detailing her captivity in Iraq, Jill Carroll, a journalist for The Christian Science Monitor, casts doubt on al-Zarqawi's alleged unimportance. She describes how one of her captors, who identified himself as Abdullah Rashid and leader of the Mujahideen Shura Council (MSC) in Iraq, conveyed to her that:

The Americans were constantly saying that the mujahideen in Iraq were led by foreigners... So, the Iraqi insurgents went to al-Zarqawi and insisted that an Iraqi be put in charge. But as I saw in coming weeks, al-Zarqawi remained the insurgents' hero, and the most influential member of their council, whatever Nour/Rashid's position. And it seemed to me, based on snatches of conversations, that two cell leaders under him – Abu Rasha and Abu Ahmed [al-Kuwaiti] – might also be on the council. At various times, I heard my captors discussing changes in their plans because of directives from the council and al-Zarqawi.

== Pre-war assassination opportunities ==
According to NBC News, the Pentagon had pushed to "take out" al-Zarqawi's operation at least three times prior to the 2003 invasion of Iraq, but had been vetoed by the National Security Council. The NSC reportedly made its decision in an effort to convince other countries to join the U.S. in a coalition against Iraq. "People were more obsessed with developing the coalition to overthrow Saddam than to execute the president's policy of pre-emption against terrorists," said former National Security Council member Roger Cressey.

In May 2005, former CIA official Michael Scheuer, who headed the CIA's bin Laden unit for six years before resigning in 2004, corroborated this. Paraphrasing his remarks, the Australian Broadcasting Corporation stated Scheuer claimed, "the United States deliberately turned down several opportunities to kill terrorist Abu Musab al-Zarqawi in the lead-up to the Iraq war." ABC added, "a plan to destroy al-Zarqawi's training camp in Kurdistan was abandoned for diplomatic reasons." Scheuer explained, "the reasons the intelligence service got for not shooting al-Zarqawi was simply that the President and the National Security Council decided it was more important not to give the Europeans the impression we were gunslingers" in an effort to win support for ousting Saddam.

This claim was also corroborated by CENTCOM official Michael DeLong on February 14, 2006. DeLong, however, claims that the reasons for abandoning the opportunity to take out al-Zarqawi's camp was that the Pentagon feared that an attack would contaminate the area with chemical weapon materials:

We almost took them out three months before the Iraq war started. We almost took that thing, but we were so concerned that the chemical cloud from there could devastate the region that we chose to take them by land rather than by smart weapons.

In his 2010 memoir, George W. Bush recounted:

The question was whether to bomb the poisons lab in the summer of 2002. We held a series of NSC meetings on that topic... Colin [Powell] and [Condoleezza Rice] felt a strike on the lab would create an international firestorm and disrupt our efforts to build a coalition to confront Saddam... I decided to continue on the diplomatic track.

== Reports of death, detention and injuries ==
=== Missing leg ===
Claims of harm to al-Zarqawi changed over time. Early in 2002, there were unverified reports from Afghan Northern Alliance members that al-Zarqawi had been killed by a missile attack in Afghanistan. Many news sources repeated the claim. Later, Kurdish groups claimed that al-Zarqawi had not died in the missile strike, but had been severely injured, and went to Baghdad in 2002 to have his leg amputated. On October 7, 2002, the day before the U.S. Congress voted to give George W. Bush authorization to invade Iraq, Bush gave a speech in Cincinnati, Ohio, that repeated as fact the claim that he had sought medical treatment in Baghdad. This was one of Bush's several examples of ways Saddam had aided, funded, and harbored al-Qaeda. Powell repeated this claim in his February 2003 speech to the UN, urging a resolution for war, and it soon became "common knowledge" that al-Zarqawi had a prosthetic leg.

In 2004, Newsweek reported that some "senior U.S. military officials in Baghdad" had come to believe that he still had his original legs. Knight Ridder later reported that the leg amputation was something "officials now acknowledge was incorrect".

When the video of the Berg beheading was released in 2004, credence was given to the claim that al-Zarqawi was alive and active. The man identified as al-Zarqawi in the video did not appear to have a prosthetic leg. Videos of al-Zarqawi aired in 2006 that clearly showed him with both legs intact. When al-Zarqawi's body was autopsied, X-rays revealed that his right lower leg was fractured.

=== Claims of death ===
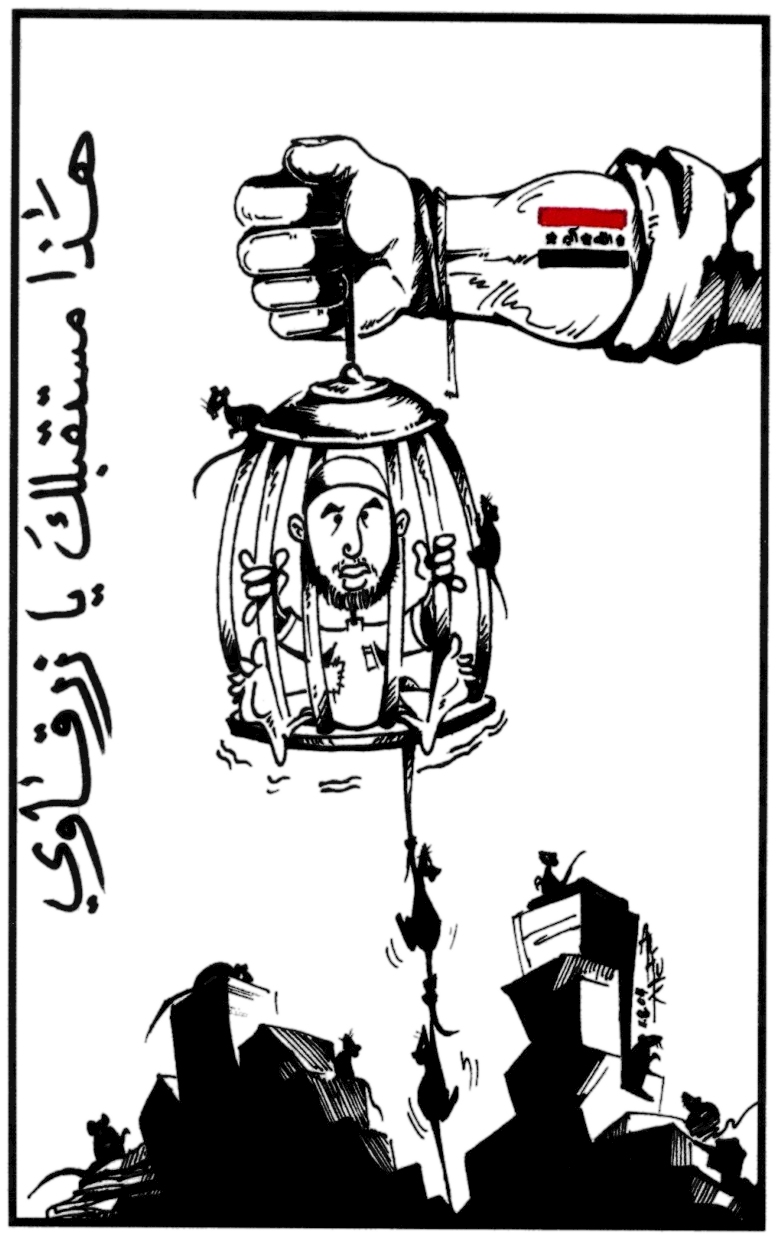
A U.S. PSYOP leaflet disseminated in Iraq shows al-Zarqawi caught in a rat trap: "This is your future, al-Zarqawi"

In March 2004, an insurgent group in Iraq issued a statement saying that al-Zarqawi had been killed in April 2003. The statement said that he was unable to escape the missile attack because of his prosthetic leg. His followers claimed he was killed in a U.S. bombing raid in the north of Iraq. The claim that al-Zarqawi had been killed in northern Iraq "at the beginning of the war", and that subsequent use of his name was a useful myth, was repeated in September 2005 by Jawad Al-Khalessi, a Shiite imam.

On May 24, 2005, it was reported on an Islamic website that a deputy would take command of al-Qaeda while al-Zarqawi recovered from injuries sustained in an attack. Later that week the Iraqi government confirmed that al-Zarqawi had been wounded by U.S. forces, although the battalion did not realize it at the time. The extent of his injuries is not known, although some radical Islamic websites called for prayers for his health. There are reports that a local hospital treated a man, suspected to be al-Zarqawi, with severe injuries. He was also said to have subsequently left Iraq for a neighbouring country, accompanied by two physicians. However, later that week the radical Islamic website retracted its report about his injuries and claimed that he was in fine health and was running the jihad operation.

In a September 16, 2005, article published by Le Monde, Al-Kalesi claimed that al-Zarqawi was killed in the Kurdish northern region of Iraq at the beginning of the U.S.-led war on the country as he was meeting with members of the Kurdish Ansar al-Islam group affiliated to al-Qaeda. Al-Kalesi also claimed "His family in Jordan even held a ceremony after his death." He also claimed that al-Zarqawi "has been used as a ploy by the United States, as an excuse to continue the occupation" and that "it was a pretext so they don't leave Iraq."

On November 20, 2005, some news sources reported that al-Zarqawi may have been killed in a coalition assault on a house in Mosul; five of those in the house were killed in the assault while the other three died through using 'suicide belts' of explosives. United States and British soldiers searched the remains, with U.S. forces using DNA samples to identify the dead. However, none of those remains belonged to him.

On June 8, 2006, NBC news and the Pentagon reported that the U.S. Special Operations Group Delta Force had been responsible for killing al-Zarqawi.

Pentagon officials have refused to say whether U.S. special operations forces participated in the al-Zarqawi operation Wednesday, but a comment Friday by President Bush suggested that some of the military's most secretive units may have been involved on the ground. Speaking to reporters, Bush mentioned that among the senior officers he called to offer congratulations for killing al-Zarqawi was Army Lt. Gen. Stanley McChrystal, commander of Joint Special Operations Command, whose forces include the Army’s clandestine counterterrorism unit, Delta Force.

=== Reportedly captured and released ===
According to a CNN report dated December 15, 2005, al-Zarqawi was captured by Iraqi forces sometime during 2004 and later released because his captors did not realize who he was. This claim was made by a Saudi suicide bomber, Ahmed Abdullah al-Shaiyah, who survived a failed suicide attack to blow up the Jordanian mission in Baghdad in December. An Iraqi investigator asked Shaiyah: "Do you know what has happened to al-Zarqawi and where he is?". He answered, "I don't know, but I heard from some of my mujahadeen brothers that Iraqi police had captured al-Zarqawi in Fallujah." Mr. Shaiyah says he then heard that the police let the terrorist go because they had failed to recognize him. U.S. officials called the report "plausible" but refused to confirm it.

== Death ==
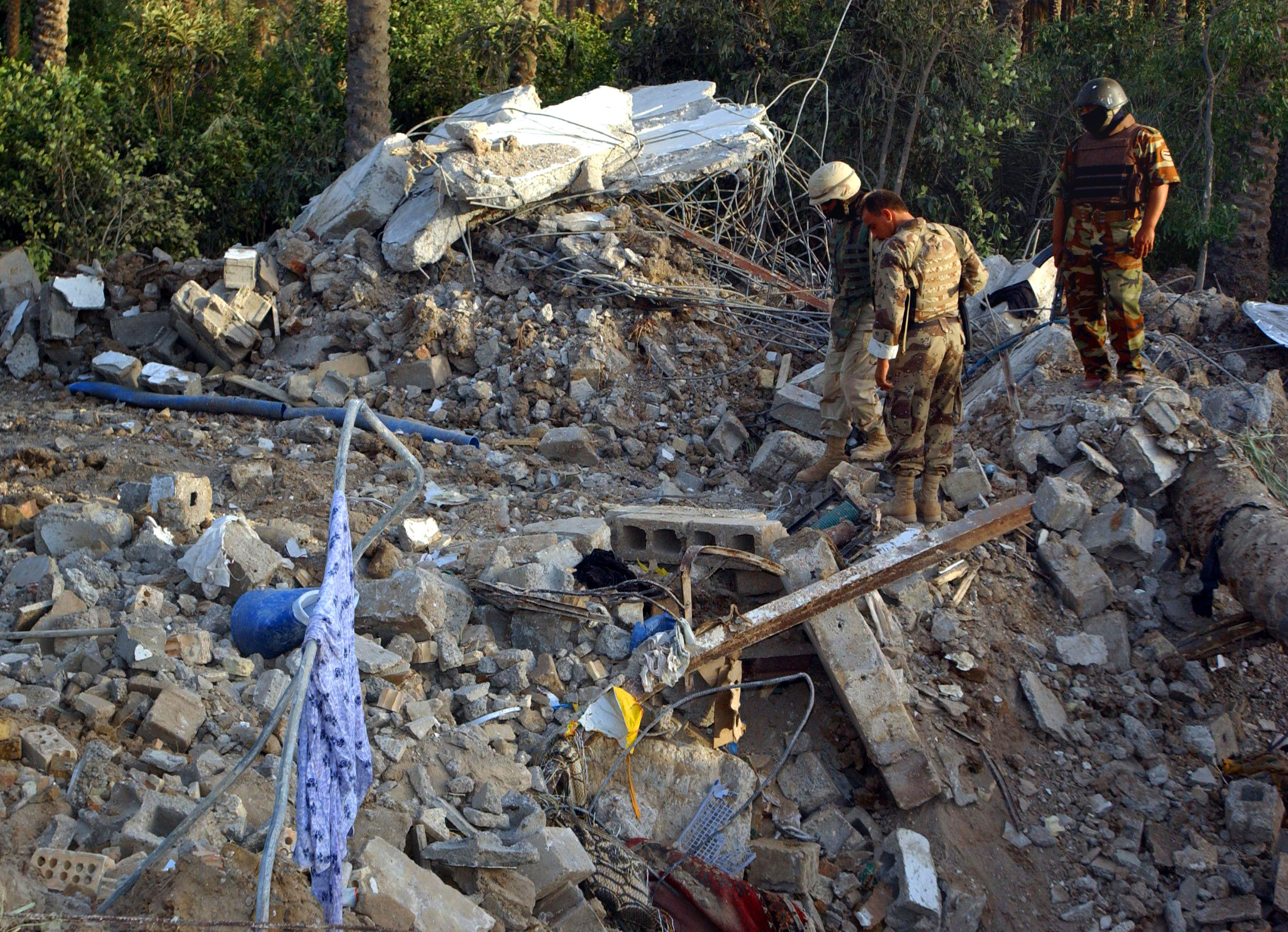
Remains of al-Zarqawi's safe house, June 8, 2006

Al-Zarqawi was killed in a targeted killing on June 7, 2006, while attending a meeting in an isolated safe house approximately 8 km (5.0 mi) north of Baqubah. At 14:15 GMT, two U.S. Air Force F-16C jets identified the house and the lead jet dropped two 500-pound (230 kg) guided bombs, a laser-guided GBU-12 and GPS-guided GBU-38, on the building located at 33°48′02.83″N 44°30′48.58″E. Five others were also reported killed. According to the U.S. military account, al-Zarqawi initially survived. Iraqi police were the first on the scene and put al-Zarqawi on a stretcher. U.S. forces arrived shortly after, just before al-Zarqawi died.

The joint task force (Task Force 145) had been tracking him for some time, and although there were some close calls, he had eluded them on many occasions. U.S. intelligence then received tips from senior AQI leaders that he and some of his associates were in the Baqubah area. According to journalist Mark Urban, the intelligence was received from a senior AQI leader who the author Mark Bowden dubbed "Abu Haydr" who had been captured in Operation Larchwood 4. The safehouse itself was watched for over six weeks before al-Zarqawi was observed entering the building by operators from Task Force 145. Jordanian intelligence reportedly helped to identify his location.

On June 8, coalition forces confirmed that al-Zarqawi's body was identified by facial recognition, fingerprinting, known scars and tattoos. They also announced the death of one of his key lieutenants, spiritual adviser Abu Abdal Rahman.

Initially, the U.S. military reported that al-Zarqawi was killed directly in the attack. However, according to U.S. General William Caldwell the day after, al-Zarqawi survived for a short time after the bombing, and after being placed on a stretcher, attempted to move and was restrained, after which he died from his injuries. An Iraqi man, who claims to have arrived on the scene a few moments after the attack, said he saw U.S. troops beating up the badly wounded but still alive al-Zarqawi. In contradiction, Caldwell asserted that when U.S. troops found al-Zarqawi barely alive they tried to provide him with medical help, rejecting the allegations that he was beaten based on an autopsy performed. The account of the Iraqi witness has not been verified. All others in the house died immediately in the blasts. On June 12, it was reported that an autopsy performed by the U.S. military revealed that the cause of death to al-Zarqawi was a blast injury to the lungs but he took nearly an hour to die.

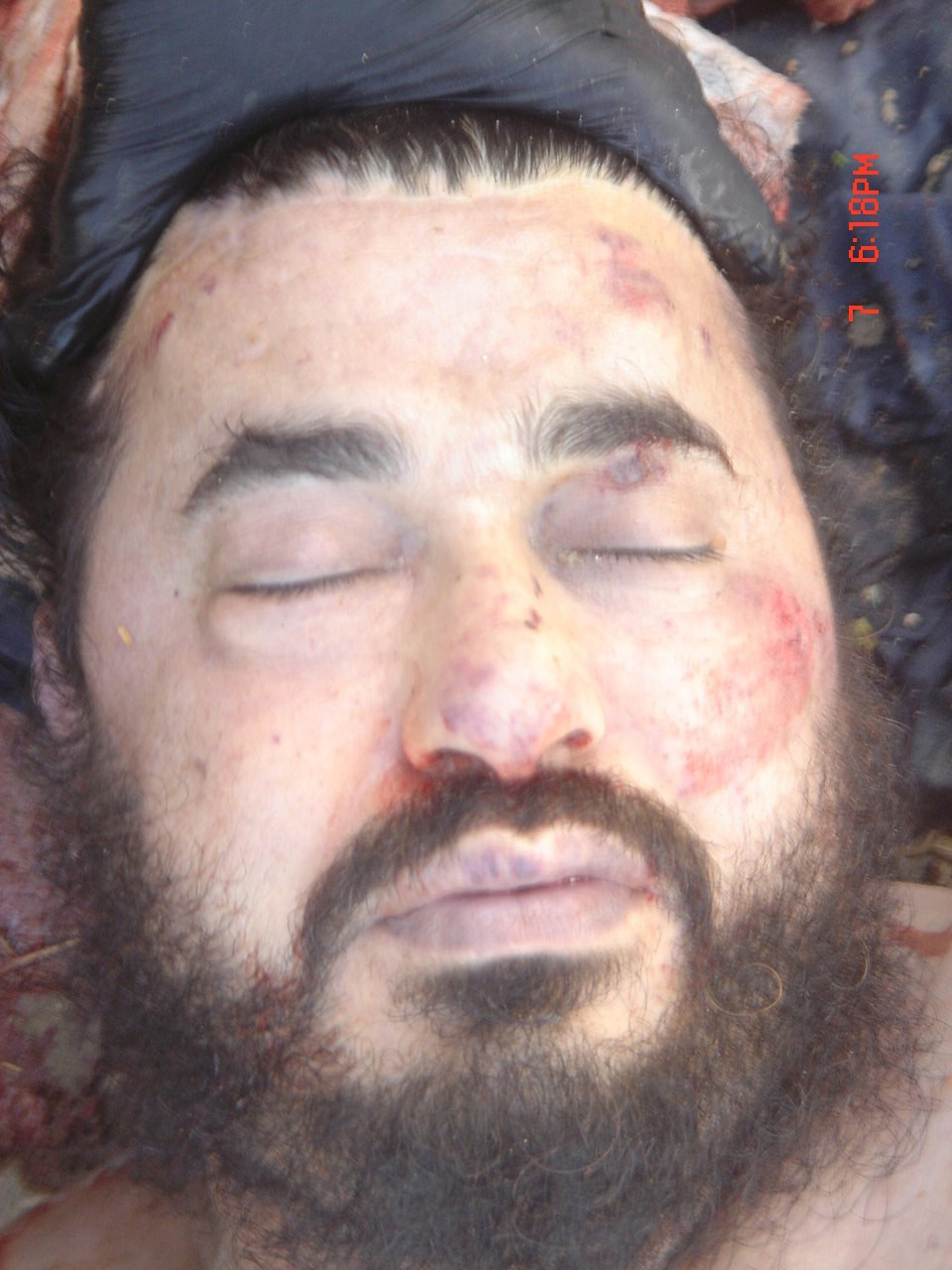
U.S. distributed photo of al-Zarqawi's corpse

The U.S. government distributed an image of al-Zarqawi's corpse as part of the press pack associated with the press conference. The release of the image has been criticised for being in questionable taste and for inadvertently creating an iconic image of al-Zarqawi that would be used to rally his supporters.

=== Reactions to death ===
Prime Minister of Iraq Nouri al-Maliki commented on al-Zarqawi's death by saying: "Today, al-Zarqawi has been terminated. Every time an al-Zarqawi appears we will kill him. We will continue confronting whoever follows his path."

George W. Bush stated that through his every action, al-Zarqawi sought to defeat the U.S. and its coalition partners by turning Iraq into a safe haven for al-Qaeda. Bush also stated, "Now al-Zarqawi has met his end and this violent man will never murder again."

Al-Zarqawi's brother-in-law has since claimed that he was a martyr. Al-Zarqawi's had family condemned him in the aftermath of the 2005 Amman bombings that killed at least 60 people. The opinion of Iraqis on his death was mixed; some believed that it would promote peace between the warring factions, while others were convinced that his death would provoke his followers to a massive retaliation and cause more bombings and deaths in Iraq.

A statement attributed to Abu Abdul Rahman was released to Islamist websites, indicating that AQI also confirmed al-Zarqawi's death; however, Rahman was killed alongside al-Zarqawi. The online statement stated "We herald the martyrdom of our mujahed [al-Zarqawi] in Iraq ... and we stress that this is an honor to our nation."

On June 16, 2006, Abu Ali al-Anbari, head of the MSC, released an audiotape statement in which he described the death of al-Zarqawi as a "great loss". He continued by stating that al-Zarqawi "will remain a symbol for all the mujahideen, who will take strength from his steadfastness". Al-Baghdadi is believed to be a former officer in Saddam's army, or its elite Republican Guard, who has worked closely with al-Zarqawi since the overthrow of Saddam's regime in April 2003.

Abdelmalek Droukdel, the leader of the Salafist Group for Preaching and Combat (GSPC), published a statement on a website where he said: "O infidels and apostates, your joy will be brief and you will cry for a long time... we are all [al-Zarqawi]." Al-Zarqawi had been Droukdel's mentor.

Counterterrorism officials have said that al-Zarqawi had become a key part of al-Qaeda's marketing campaign and that al-Zarqawi served as a "worldwide jihadist rallying point and a fundraising icon". Rep. Mike Rogers, who served on the House Intelligence Committee, called al-Zarqawi "The terrorist celeb, if you will, ... It is like selling for any organization. They are selling the success of al-Zarqawi in eluding capture in Iraq."

On June 23, Al Jazeera aired a video in which Ayman al-Zawahiri, bin Laden's deputy, states that al-Zarqawi was "a soldier, a hero, an imam and the prince of martyrs, [and his death] has defined the struggle between the crusaders and Islam in Iraq".

On June 30, bin Laden released an audio recording in which he stated: "Our Islamic nation was surprised to find its knight, the lion of jihad, the man of determination and will, [al-Zarqawi], killed in a shameful American raid. We pray to God to bless him and accept him among the martyrs as he had hoped for." He also defended al-Zarqawi, saying he had "clear instructions" to focus on U.S.-led forces in Iraq but also "for those who... stood to fight on the side of the crusaders against the Muslims, then he should kill them whoever they are, regardless of their sect or tribe." Shortly after, he released another audio tape in which he stated, "Our brothers, the mujahedeen in the al-Qaeda organization, have chosen the dear brother [Abu Ayyub al-Masri] as their [new leader.] I advise him to focus his fighting on the Americans and everyone who supports them and allies himself with them in their war on the people of Islam and Iraq."

=== Alleged betrayal by al-Qaeda ===
A day before al-Zarqawi was killed, a U.S. strategic analysis site suggested that al-Zarqawi could have lost the trust of al-Qaeda due to his emphatic anti-Shia stance and the massacres of civilians allegedly committed in his name. Reports in The New York Times on June 8 treated the betrayal by at least one fellow al-Qaeda member as fact, stating that an individual close to al-Zarqawi disclosed the identity and location of Abu Abdul Rahman to Jordanian and American intelligence. Non-stop surveillance of Rahman quickly led to al-Zarqawi. The Associated Press quotes an unnamed Jordanian official as saying that the effort to find al-Zarqawi was successful partly due to information that Jordan obtained one month beforehand from a captured al-Zarqawi al-Qaeda operative named Ziad Khalaf Raja al-Karbouly.

=== Reward ===
In apparent contradiction to statements made earlier in the day by U.S. ambassador to Iraq Zalmay Khalilzad, an Iraqi spokesman said the US$25 million reward "will be honored". Khalilzad had stated the bounty would not be paid because the decisive information leading to al-Zarqawi's whereabouts had been supplied by an al-Qaeda operative in Iraq, whose own complicity in violent acts would disqualify him from receiving payment.

U.S. Rep. Mark Kirk, who drafted the legislation specifying the al-Zarqawi reward, was quoted as saying contemporaneously that the Bush Administration planned to pay "some rewards" for al-Zarqawi. "I don't have the specifics," he stated. "The administration is now working out who will get it and how much. As their appropriator who funds them, I asked them to let me know if they need more money to run the rewards program now that they are paying this out."

=== Post-Zarqawi Iraq environment ===
Al-Zarqawi's death was seen as a major coup for the U.S. government in terms of the political and propaganda stakes. However, unconfirmed rumors in early April 2006 suggested that al-Zarqawi had been demoted from a strategic or coordinating function to overseer of paramilitary/terrorist activities of his group and that Abu Ali al-Anbari of the MSC succeeded al-Zarqawi in the former function. On June 15, 2006, the U.S. officially identified Abu Ayyub al-Masri as the successor to AQI.

After al-Zarqawi's death, there was little or no immediately identifiable change in terms of the level of violence and attacks against U.S. and allied troops. In the immediate aftermath insurgency attacks averaged 90 a day, apparently some of the highest on record. Four months after al-Zarqawi's death, it was estimated that 374 coalition soldiers and 10,355 Iraqis had been killed. Several insurgency groups and heads of Sunni Muslim tribes also formed the MSC.

By late 2007, violent and indiscriminate attacks directed by AQI against Iraqi civilians had severely damaged their image and caused the loss of support among the population, isolating the group. In a major blow to AQI, thousands of former Sunni militants that previously fought along with the group started to actively fight AQI and also work with the American and Iraqi forces, starting with the creation of the Anbar Awakening Council, so called because of its Anbar origins. The group spread to all Sunni cities and communities and some Shiite areas and adopted the broader name Sons of Iraq. The Sons of Iraq was instrumental in giving tips to coalition forces about weapons caches and militants resulting in the destruction of over 2,500 weapons caches and over 800 militants being killed or captured. In addition, the 30,000 strong U.S. troop surge supplied military planners with more manpower for operations targeting AQI, MSC, Ansar Al-Sunnah, and other terrorist groups. The resulting events led to dozens of high-level AQI leaders being captured or killed. Al-Qaeda seemed to have lost its foothold in Iraq and appeared to be severely crippled due to its lack of vast weapons caches, leaders, safe havens, and Iraqis willing to support them. Accordingly, the bounty issued for Abu Ayyub-al-Masri was eventually cut from $5 million down to a mere $100,000 in April 2008.

On January 8 and 28, 2008, Iraqi and U.S. forces launched Operation Phantom Phoenix and the Nineveh campaign (aka the Mosul Campaign) killing and capturing over 4,600 militants, and locating and destroying over 3,000 weapons caches, effectively leaving AQI with one last major insurgent stronghold—Diyala. On July 29, 2008, Iraqi, U.S. and Sons of Iraq forces launched Operation Augurs of Prosperity in Diyala Governorate and surrounding areas to clear AQI out of its last stronghold. Two operations had already been launched in Diyala with mixed results, and this campaign was expected to face fierce resistance. The resulting operation left over 500 weapons caches destroyed and five militants killed; 483 militants were captured due to the lack of resistance from the insurgent forces. Twenty four high-level AQI terrorists were killed or captured.

== Writings ==
Kalimāt mudī'a (Enlightening Speech in English) is a more than 600-page compilation of al-Zarqawi's writings and transcribed speeches.

== See also ==
- Abdel Majid al-Majali

== General bibliography ==
- Brisard, Jean-Charles; Martinez, Damien (2005). Zarqaoui : le nouveau visage d'al-Qaïda (in French). Fayard.
- Kepel, Gilles (2005). Al-Qaida dans le texte : écrits d'Oussama ben Laden, Abdallah Azzam, Ayman al-Zawahiri et Abou Moussab al-Zarqawi (in French). Paris: Presses universitaires de France (PUF). ISBN 978-2130561514.
- Milelli, Jean-Pierre (2005). La lettre d'al-Zarqaoui à Ben Laden (in French). Paris, France: Choiseul.

Preceded by Position Created	Head of Al-Qaeda in Iraq; 1999–2006	Succeeded by Abu Hamza al-Muhajir (Abu Ayyub al-Masri)
