= Operation Larchwood 4 =

2006 military operation in Iraq

- Part of the Iraqi civil war and the Iraq War
Date	16 April 2006
Location	Yusufiyah, Iraq
Result	Coalition Victory: Intelligence gathered eventually leads to the death of Abu Musab al-Zarqawi

Belligerents
United Kingdom; United States (Support); Iraq (Support)	Mujahideen Shura Council: Al-Qaeda in Iraq

Commanders and leaders
(United Kingdom) Captain Ewan	Abu Atiya (POW)

Strength
Unknown total	at least 7

Casualties and losses
5 wounded	5 killed 2 captured
- 1 civilian killed and 4 more injured

Operation Larchwood 4 was an operation launched by B Squadron of the British 22nd Special Air Service Regiment supported by US forces to attack an Al-Qaeda-occupied farmhouse in Yusufiyah, Baghdad Governorate, Iraq. The raid was a major success, as a result of which intelligence was gathered which led to the finding and killing of Al-Qaeda in Iraq's leader Abu Musab al-Zarqawi a few months later.

== Background ==
From 15 January to 15 October 2006, AQI (Al-Qaeda in Iraq) was one of five or six other Sunni insurgent groups that formed the Mujahideen Shura Council (MSC) that embraced the same Salafist ideology as AQI.

Operation Larchwood 4 was developed from intelligence gathered in previous raids conducted by B Squadron SAS and B Squadron 1st SFOD-D (1st Special Forces Operational Detachment-Delta) on AQI targets in areas dubbed: "Baghdad Belts" - a term used by the coalition to for communities surrounding the capital; Baghdad.

In night-time raids on 8 and 13 April 2006, in a town near Yusufiyah, the operators killed seven insurgents (five on 8 April and two on 13 April) who the intelligence agencies claimed were foreign jihadists. The intelligence gathered in these raids gave Joint Special Operations Command (JSOC) a clear intelligence picture of a group of Al-Qaeda cells around Baghdad, suggesting that their tactics had evolved.

Operation Larchwood 4 was part of an intense series of operations in the Triangle of Death, most of which were carried out by Delta Force and other US forces.

== Operation ==
=== Target ===
The target for the operation was to capture a mid-level terrorist leader to whom journalist Mark Urban gave the pseudonym Abu Atiya. (The target should not be confused with Abu Atiya, an alleged subordinate of Al-Zarqawi's who was at that time in prison in Jordan.)

Abu Atiya, the operation's target, was thought to run AQI's local media campaign, and HUMINT and SIGINT intelligence showed he also had a role in setting up VBIEDs. His location was confirmed by cell phone intercepts and a grid reference graphic in the form of an aerial photo. The target building was an insurgent-held farmhouse on the outskirts of Yusufiyah.

=== Plan ===
The operation was planned by and commanded by an SAS officer called Captain Ewan (pseudonym assigned by Mark Urban), a battle-experienced officer in his twenties. Captain Ewan would command an assault team that would be transported by Puma helicopter to a landing zone codenamed L1, located north-east of the target building and then move through the orchard to the target building, using it as cover. Once there, the assault force of four teams would split into two groups, Ewan leading one and a less experienced SAS captain leading the other, one group would attack from the east and the other from the south. Also part of the assault team were two Iraqi interpreters attached to the SAS would interpret and assist in Sensitive Site Exploration, just in case the targets eluded the assault force, SAS snipers in Lynx helicopters would orbit the target building. In addition, a platoon of British paratroopers from the SFSG/Task Force Maroon would cordon/block off the area around the target building; they would be inserted by Chinook helicopter.

Charlie Company of 2nd Battalion, 502nd Infantry Regiment (C Co 2–502) would be in reserve as the quick reaction force (QRF) while providing a blocking position to deny enemy movement out of the area for the RAF and AAC helicopters, two American C-130's were on station: one was a command aircraft and the other was an AC-130. It was necessary for there to be a large amount of support for the SAS operation due to the heightened tension between the Iraqi people in the area and coalition troops due to the recent Mahmudiyah rape and killings incident.

=== Raid ===
After a short flight to L1, the Pumas landed just after 0200, the SAS operators disembarked and made their way carefully to the target building.

Once behind cover within yards of the house two SAS operators were sent forward to scout the south-east corner of the building, they found a door to the target building wide open on that side. Captain Ewan ordered the assault commence, one team moved quickly into the building, seconds later gunfire rang out and 3 SAS operators were wounded in the corridor of the house, the team withdrew out of the house. The SFSG attempted to suppress the insurgent fire from the house, whilst the casualties took cover behind a sand berm and got medical attention, Insurgents inside the building and on the roof began firing and throwing grenades on the SAS operators, Captain Ewan resumed the assault, approaching the building under covering fire and throwing in grenades, as the operators re-entered 2 more were wounded but killed an insurgent in the corridor.

An insurgent wearing a suicide vest armed with an assault rifle and grenades ran out of the building and took cover under a car parked outside, SAS snipers in the Lynx helicopter and paratroopers from Task Force Maroon saw him and killed him.

Inside the building, the SAS operators began clearing the downstairs room by room, killing another insurgent, in one room they found half a dozen women and children, in the previous crossfire or possibly before the raid, they found one woman dead as well as 3 others and a child wounded. With the rooms cleared the Operators turned their attention to the roof, led by one SAS operator, a NCO, who had already been wounded, they moved upstairs. On the top of the staircase, the operator was confronted by an insurgent wearing a suicide vest, the insurgent detonated his bomb, blowing the NCO back down the stair, sustaining further injury, but was able to pick himself up. Another insurgent blew himself up on the roof of the building.

Amongst the women and children were 5 men, one was Abu Atiya and he was detained, another man who appeared to be an insurgent was also detained and both were taken out by helicopter, the rest of the civilians were taken by helicopter to the 10th Combat Support Hospital. Meanwhile, the SAS operators began Sensitive Site Exploration, in the time allotted, they gathered a great deal of intelligence and weapons.

== Aftermath ==
5 SAS operators had been wounded whilst 5 insurgents were dead and another 2 captured and 1 civilian was killed with 4 more wounded. The SAS operators wounds were not serious and they didn't stay out of duty long, the operation took place not long before B squadron was due to return home to the UK, its commanding officer was decorated for the tour, Captain Ewan was awarded a medal and many members of the squadron who took part in the raid were decorated. American commanders were thrilled with the outcome of the raid and it vindicated the idea of using the SAS against the same targets as Delta Force.

U.S. Major General Rick Lynch claimed that JSOC units (including the SAS) launched about five operations in the preceding weeks before Larchwood 4, killing 31 foreign fighters (90% of them were suicide bombers), which degraded AQI's capability to mount retaliatory attacks in the months following the operation.

=== Intelligence ===
The intelligence collected by the SAS was examined by JSOC and NSA experts. They discovered videos and pictures of Zarqawi giving political messages and posing with his follower. At the time, the only photos and videos of Zarqawi were outdated. Nine days after the raid, Zarqawi released a propaganda video under the logo of the MSC, the same video that the SAS captured, albeit edited, the video's contents were, in summary, promoting Islamist terrorism.

The US countered the video with the same video's bloopers etc. resulting in the video having less of an effect on its target audience.

The Al Qaeda insurgents captured in the operation were taken to JSOC's Temporary Screening Facility in Balad and were interrogated for further intelligence. It turned out that the second suspected insurgent captured was more important than Abu Atiya, the author Mark Bowden assigned him the pseudonym "Abu Haydr", he was "Admin Emir" for AQI's Abu Ghraib cell and around 20 May, was tricked into revealing that he was close to Al-Zarqawi's religious adviser whom he named as Sheikh abu abdur Rahman, who had first come to the U.S. intelligence agency attention 2 years before.

Subsequent intelligence suggested that on the night of the operation Abu Musab Al-Zarqawi was in another building not far away.

=== Death of Al-Zarqawi ===
On 7 June 2006, SAS operators from Task force 145 marked the Sheikh's location in Baghdad, he then drove to a remote farmhouse in the village of Hibhib a village outside Baquba north of Baghdad, he under surveillance by U.S. Predator Drone, where a man matching Zarqawi's description greeted him. Two F-16 dropped 500lbs bombs on the house killing all the occupants. American troops recovered Zarqawi body.

== See also ==
- List of SAS operations
- Operation Neptune Spear
- JSOC Task Force in the Iraq War
