= Senate Report on Iraqi WMD Intelligence =

2004 report by the U.S. Senate Select Committee on Intelligence

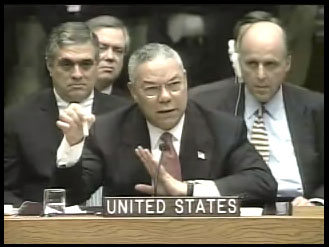
U.S. secretary of state Colin Powell displays a vial of anthrax during his presentation to the UN Security Council, February 5, 2003. CIA Director George Tenet (left) and UN Ambassador John Negroponte look on from behind. The Senate Select Committee on Intelligence found that many of the allegations in the speech were not supported by the underlying intelligence.

The Senate Report on Iraqi WMD Intelligence (formally, the Report of the Select Committee on Intelligence on the U.S. Intelligence Community's Prewar Intelligence Assessments on Iraq) was the report by the United States Senate Select Committee on Intelligence concerning the U.S. Intelligence Community's assessments of Iraq during the time leading up to the 2003 invasion of Iraq. The report, which was released on July 9, 2004, identified numerous failures in the intelligence-gathering and -analysis process. The report found that these failures led to the creation of inaccurate materials that misled both government policy makers and the American public.

The Committee's nine Republicans and eight Democrats agreed on the report's major conclusions and unanimously endorsed its findings. They disagreed, though, on the impact that statements on Iraq by senior members of the Bush administration had on the intelligence process. The second phase of the investigation, addressing the way senior policymakers used the intelligence, was published on May 25, 2007. Portions of the phase II report not released at that time include the review of public statements by U.S. government leaders prior to the war, and the assessment of the activities of Douglas Feith and the Pentagon's Office of Special Plans.

== Background ==
After the 1991 Gulf War, Iraq agreed to destroy its stockpiles of weapons of mass destruction (WMD) and dismantle its WMD programs. To verify compliance, UN inspection teams were to be given free access to the country. Over the next seven years, inspectors sometimes complained about non-cooperation and evasiveness by the Iraqi government. Iraqi officials in turn complained that some weapons inspectors were acting as spies for foreign intelligence agencies. In 1998, after a critical report on the Iraqi government's noncompliance was issued by UN weapons inspector Richard Butler, U.S. president Bill Clinton announced that he would launch airstrikes on Iraqi targets (see Operation Desert Fox). Butler evacuated his inspectors and the bombing proceeded. After the bombing campaign, Iraq refused to allow weapons inspectors to re-enter the country.

After George W. Bush became president in January 2001, and especially after the September 11 attacks, the U.S. government increased its attention on Iraq. In the first half of 2002, a series of public statements by President Bush and senior members of his administration indicated a willingness to use force, if necessary, to remove Saddam Hussein from power. On October 1, 2002, the CIA delivered a classified National Intelligence Estimate (NIE) assessing the threat represented by Iraq's WMD activities. Three days later, CIA Director George Tenet published an unclassified white paper on the subject of Iraq's WMD capabilities. Over the next two weeks, a joint resolution authorizing the use of force was passed by both houses of Congress.

Over the next several months the U.S. conducted a diplomatic effort at the United Nations, seeking to obtain that body's approval for a new WMD inspection regime, and, potentially, for the use of force to overthrow the Iraqi government. The UN Security Council passed resolution 1441 on November 8, 2002, calling on Iraq to make "an accurate full, final, and complete disclosure" of its WMD programs, and threatening "serious consequences" if it did not comply. In the wake of resolution 1441, Iraq allowed UN weapons inspectors to return to the country. While the inspections were taking place, the U.S. continued to lobby the members of the UN Security Council to pass a resolution explicitly authorizing the use of force against Iraq. As part of that effort U.S. Secretary of State Colin Powell gave a presentation to the UN on February 5, 2003, in which he detailed false intelligence gatherings regarding Iraqi WMD. The USA was faced with the opposition of a majority of the Security Council's members, including Germany, France, and Russia, and afterwards abandoned the effort to obtain an explicit use-of-force authorization from the UN.

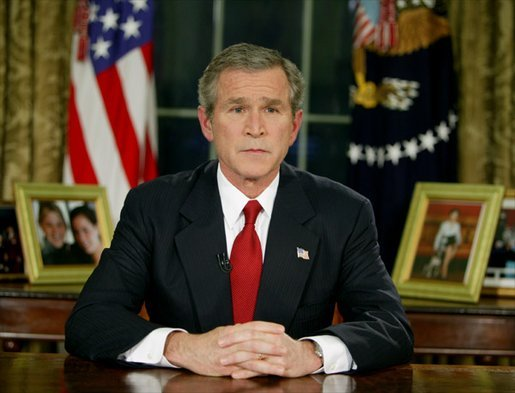
President George W. Bush addresses the nation from the Oval Office, March 19, 2003, to announce the beginning of Operation Iraqi Freedom. "The people of the United States and our friends and allies will not live at the mercy of an outlaw regime that threatens the peace with weapons of mass murder." The Senate committee found that many of the administration's pre-war statements about Iraqi WMD were not supported by the underlying intelligence.

On March 20, 2003, the U.S. and its allies invaded Iraq, an action that led to the overthrow of the government of Saddam Hussein.

Over the ensuing year, U.S. and allied forces searched for evidence supporting the pre-invasion claims about Iraqi WMD stockpiles and programs. The lead role in this search was played by the Iraq Survey Group (ISG), consisting of investigators from the U.S. Department of Defense and the CIA. Although scattered remnants of Iraq's WMD stockpiles from the time of the 1991 Gulf War were found, the ISG's final report concluded that Iraq did not possess significant WMD capabilities at the time of the invasion of Iraq. The ISG also stated that Iraq had intended to restart all banned weapons programs as soon as multilateral sanctions against it had been dropped.

As these facts were emerging in June 2003, U.S. senator Pat Roberts (R-KS), chairman of the Senate Select Committee on Intelligence, announced that the Committee, as part of its regular oversight responsibility, would conduct a "thorough and bipartisan review" of Iraqi WMD and ties to terrorist groups. On June 20, 2003, Senator Roberts and Senator John D. Rockefeller IV (D-WV), the Committee's vice chairman, issued a joint press release announcing that the committee would conduct a detailed review of the Iraqi WMD intelligence process, including the following areas:

- the quantity and quality of U.S. intelligence on Iraqi weapons of mass destruction programs, ties to terrorist groups, Saddam Hussein's threat to stability and security in the region, and his repression of his own people;
- the objectivity, reasonableness, independence, and accuracy of the judgments reached by the Intelligence Community;
- whether those judgments were properly disseminated to policy makers in the Executive Branch and Congress;
- whether any influence was brought to bear on anyone to shape their analysis to support policy objectives; and
- other issues we mutually identify in the course of the Committee's review.

== Investigation committee membership ==
The following nine Republicans were members of the Committee at the time the investigation was launched: Committee Chairman Pat Roberts (R-KS), Orrin Hatch (R-UT), Michael DeWine (R-OH), Kit Bond (R-MO), Trent Lott (R-MS), Olympia Snowe (R-ME), Chuck Hagel (R-NE), Saxby Chambliss (R-GA), and John Warner (R-VA).

The following eight Democrats made up the rest of the Committee: Vice-Chairman Jay Rockefeller (D-WV), Carl Levin (D-MI), Dianne Feinstein (D-CA), Ronald Wyden (D-OR), Dick Durbin (D-IL), Evan Bayh (D-IN), John Edwards (D-NC), and Barbara Mikulski (D-MD).

=== Chronology ===
In the course of the investigation, Committee staff reviewed more than 30,000 pages of documentation provided by the intelligence community. The Committee requested that it be supplied copies of the President's Daily Briefs (PDBs) concerning Iraq's WMD capabilities and ties to terrorism, but the White House denied that request. An article by journalist Murray Waas has described a specific controversy over the PDB for September 21, 2001, which allegedly said that the US intelligence community had "no evidence" linking Saddam Hussein to the September 11 attacks, and "scant credible evidence" that Iraq had any significant collaborative ties with al Qaeda.

Committee staff also interviewed more than 200 people, including intelligence analysts and senior officials with the Central Intelligence Agency (CIA), Defense Intelligence Agency, the Department of Defense, and other federal entities involved in intelligence gathering and analysis. The Committee also held a series of hearings on the intelligence concerning Iraqi WMD and ties to terrorism.

On February 12, 2004, Senators Roberts and Rockefeller announced an expansion of the scope of the investigation. The new elements added to the investigation were:

- the collection of intelligence on Iraq from the end of the Gulf War to the commencement of Operation Iraqi Freedom;
- whether public statements and reports and testimony regarding Iraq by U.S. Government officials made between the Gulf War period and the commencement of Operation Iraqi Freedom were substantiated by intelligence information;
- the postwar findings about Iraq's weapons of mass destruction and weapons programs and links to terrorism and how they compare with prewar assessments;
- prewar intelligence assessments about postwar Iraq;
- any intelligence activities relating to Iraq conducted by the Policy Counterterrorism Evaluation Group (PCTEG) and the Office of Special Plans within the Office of the Under Secretary of Defense for Policy; and
- the use by the Intelligence Community of information provided by the Iraqi National Congress (INC).

On June 17, 2004, Senators Roberts and Rockefeller announced that the completed report had been unanimously approved by the Committee's members, and that they were working with the CIA on the issue of declassification. The completed report, with blacked-out text ("redactions") made by the CIA, was released on July 9, 2004. The report did not cover most of the new topics announced in the February 12, 2004, press release; instead, those topics were now to be covered in a separate report, to be completed later, covering "phase two" of the investigation.

== Phase I conclusions ==
The 511-page report focuses much of its attention on the October, 2002, classified National Intelligence Estimate (NIE) titled Iraq's Continuing Programs for Weapons of Mass Destruction. The report includes 117 formal conclusions, as well as supporting discussion and background information.

=== General conclusions on intelligence relating to Iraq's WMD and ties to terrorism ===
The report's first conclusion points to widespread flaws in the October 2002 NIE, and attributes those flaws to failure by analysts in the intelligence community:

Most of the major key judgments in the Intelligence Community's October 2002 National Intelligence Estimate (NIE), Iraq's Continuing Programs for Weapons of Mass Destruction, either overstated, or were not supported by, the underlying intelligence reporting. A series of failures, particularly in analytic trade craft, led to the mischaracterization of the intelligence.

Subsequent conclusions fault the intelligence community for failing to adequately explain to policymakers the uncertainties that underlay the NIE's conclusions, and for succumbing to "group think," in which the intelligence community adopted untested (and, in hindsight, unwarranted) assumptions about the extent of Iraq's WMD stockpiles and programs. The committee identified a failure to adequately supervise analysts and collectors, and a failure to develop human sources of intelligence (HUMINT) inside Iraq after the departure of international weapons inspectors in 1998. It also cited the post-9/11 environment as having led to an increase in the intensity with which policymakers review and question threat information.

=== Niger and the Iraqi nuclear program ===
Section II of the report discussed the handling of intelligence indicating that Iraq might be attempting to purchase uranium from Niger. The report examined the role played by former ambassador Joseph Wilson in investigating the issue, and the way Wilson's assessment was communicated within the intelligence community. It also discusses the process whereby references to Iraq's uranium-procurement efforts were removed from some speeches at the behest of intelligence officials, but left in President Bush's 2003 State of the Union address. The report concludes that prior to October, 2002, it was reasonable for the intelligence community to assess Iraq may have been attempting to obtain uranium from Africa.

Section III of the report discusses assessments of Iraq's domestic nuclear program. It focuses a significant amount of attention on the intelligence process that took place in the spring of 2001 regarding Iraq's attempts to purchase 60,000 high-strength aluminum tubes. The CIA concluded that the tubes could be intended for constructing centrifuges for a uranium-enrichment program (i.e., for a restarted Iraqi nuclear weapons program); analysts in the Department of Energy and the Department of Defense considered that to be unlikely.

The October 2002 NIE stated that Iraq appeared to be reconstituting its nuclear weapons program. The Committee's report concluded that this view was not supported by the underlying intelligence, and the report agreed with the opinion of the State Department's Bureau of Intelligence and Research, expressed as an "alternative view" in the NIE, that the available intelligence did not make "a compelling case for reconstitution" of the Iraqi nuclear program. The committee reached several conclusions critical of poor communications between the CIA and other parts of the intelligence community concerning this issue.

=== Biological weapons, chemical weapons, and delivery systems ===
The sections of the report concerned with assessments of Iraq's biological weapons programs, chemical weapons programs, and delivery systems contain extensive discussion of the problem of inadequate "human intelligence" for intelligence gathering in Iraq. There is discussion of "CURVEBALL," an Iraqi defector who provided much of the information regarding Iraq's alleged mobile bioweapons labs, although much of the material in this part of the report has been redacted. The report concludes that the October 2002 NIE and other statements regarding Iraq's biological and chemical WMD and associated delivery systems were for the most part not supported by the underlying intelligence data supplied to the Committee.

Committee Chairman Pat Roberts told NBC's Tim Russert that "Curveball really provided 98 percent of the assessment as to whether or not the Iraqis had a biological weapon." This was in despite the fact that "nobody inside the U.S. government had ever actually spoken to the informant – except [for a single] Pentagon analyst, who concluded the man was an alcoholic and utterly useless as a source."

After learning the intelligence provided by Curveball was going to be used as the "backbone" of the case for war, the Pentagon analyst wrote a letter to the CIA expressing his concerns. The Deputy of the CIA Counter Proliferation Unit quickly responded by saying:

"Let's keep in mind the fact that this war's going to happen regardless of what Curve Ball said or didn't say. The Powers That Be probably aren't terribly interested in whether Curve Ball knows what he's talking about."

One area where the Committee found that the intelligence community's reporting accurately reflected the underlying intelligence concerned Iraq's retention of Scud-type ballistic missiles, and its development of new types of short- and medium-range missiles. In the case of the NIE's reporting on Iraq's development of an unmanned aerial vehicle (UAV), however, the Committee found that the reporting generally was not well-supported by the underlying intelligence, and overstated what was known concerning the likelihood that the Iraqi UAVs were intended for use as a delivery means for biological weapons.

=== Colin Powell's speech to the UN ===
Section VII of the Committee's report focuses on the intelligence behind Secretary of State Colin Powell's speech to the UN on February 5, 2003. The report describes the process whereby the CIA provided a draft of the speech to the National Security Council (NSC), and then, at the request of the NSC, worked to expand the speech with additional material, especially regarding Iraq's nuclear program. The report also describes the subsequent review made by Colin Powell and analysts from the State Department with analysts from the CIA. In the speech, Powell said that "every statement I make today is backed up by sources, solid sources. These are not assertions. What we're giving you are facts and conclusions based on solid intelligence." Despite this, the Committee concluded that "[m]uch of the information provided or cleared by the Central Intelligence Agency (CIA) for inclusion in Secretary Powell's speech was overstated, misleading, or incorrect."

=== Pressure on analysts ===
The report partially looks at the question of whether pressure was brought to bear on intelligence analysts to get them to shape their assessments to support particular policy objectives. It recounts how Sen. Roberts made repeated public calls for any analysts who believed they had been pressured to alter their assessments to speak with the Committee about their experiences. The Committee also attempted to identify and interview several individuals who had described such pressure in media reports and government documents. The report says that the Committee did not find any evidence that administration officials tried to pressure analysts to change their judgments; however, an evaluation of the Bush Administration's use of intelligence was put off until "phase two" of the investigation. (Several Democratic committee members, although they voted to approve the report's conclusions, expressed reservations on this issue and Republicans also acknowledged that the issue of "pressure" would be examined during phase two; see below, in the discussion of the report's "additional views", for details.)

=== The October 2002 white paper ===
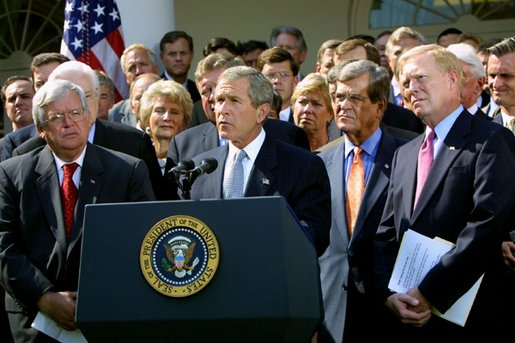
President George Bush, surrounded by leaders of the House and Senate, announces the Joint Resolution to Authorize the Use of United States Armed Forces Against Iraq, October 2, 2002. Lawmakers debated and passed the resolution during the following two weeks, basing their votes in part on the information in the classified National Intelligence Estimate and the unclassified white paper on Iraqi WMD – documents that the Senate report on pre-war intelligence found to have been deeply flawed.

A white paper titled "Iraq's Continuing Programs for Weapons of Mass Destruction" was released by CIA Director George Tenet on October 4, 2002, three days after the National Intelligence Estimate (NIE) on Iraqi WMD was released. In part, the white paper was a response to Congressional requests for an unclassified version of the information in the NIE, since that document was available only to a small group of lawmakers due to its classified nature. The white paper, although shorter and less-detailed than the NIE, was very similar to it in format and major conclusions. The Committee found that the white paper presented a significantly stronger characterization of the threat represented by Iraqi WMD than did the NIE, and that that stronger characterization was not supported by the underlying intelligence.

=== Iraq's alleged links to al-Qaeda ===
Several sections in the report examine topics relating to allegations of links between Iraq and terrorism. The Committee said that the intelligence community produced reasonable conclusions on this topic, although the Committee found gaps in the intelligence-gathering methods used (Page 350).

Much of the Committee's investigation in this area concerned the CIA's preparation and distribution of a document titled Iraqi Support for Terrorism. An initial version of this document was distributed to senior Bush administration officials in September, 2002; an updated version of the document was provided to Congress in January, 2003. The conclusion of CIA analysts was that although Saddam Hussein's government had likely had several contacts with al Qaeda during the 1990s, "those contacts did not add up to an established formal relationship." The CIA also attempted to determine the attitudes that Iraqi and al-Qaeda leadership held toward the possibility of working cooperatively with each other. The available intelligence in this area suggested that Iraqi and al-Qaeda leaders would be wary of working together.

The "most problematic area of contact between Iraq and al-Qaida were the reports of training in the use of non-conventional weapons, specifically chemical and biological weapons." Abu Musab al-Zarqawi had been present in Baghdad, and Ansar al-Islam, an al-Qaeda affiliate organization that identified itself as the "sworn enemy" of Saddam Hussein had operated in northeastern Iraq in an area under Kurdish control. There was no evidence proving Iraqi complicity or assistance in an al Qaeda attack. The report criticized the CIA for its lack of human intelligence resources in Iraq to assess the country's ties with terrorism during the time prior to 2002.

In terms of pressure on analysts, the Committee said that after 9/11, "analysts were under tremendous pressure to make correct assessments, to avoid missing a credible threat, and to avoid an intelligence failure on the scale of 9/11." The Committee concluded that this resulted in assessments that were "bold and assertive in pointing out potential terrorist links," and that this pressure was more the result of analysts' own desire to be as thorough as possible, than of any undue influence by the administration, for which the Committee said they found no evidence. Several Democratic members of the Committee said in the report's "additional views" that the question had not been adequately explored.

== The report's "additional views" ==
The Republican and Democratic members of the Senate Select Committee on Intelligence voted unanimously to approve the finished report. There were, however, significant areas of disagreement, with those disagreements being expressed in the form of "additional views" attached at the end of the report proper.

=== Senators Roberts, Hatch, and Bond ===
In the first "additional view" attached to the report, Chairman Pat Roberts (R-KS), joined by Senators Orrin Hatch (R-UT) and Christopher Bond (R-MO), presents two conclusions that Democratic members of the Committee were unwilling to include in the report, even though, according to Roberts, "there was no dispute with the underlying facts." Those two conclusions related to the actions of Joseph Wilson, the former ambassador who was sent to Niger in 2002 to investigate allegations that the Iraqi government was attempting to purchase "yellowcake" uranium, presumably as part of an attempt to revive Iraq's nuclear weapons program. The two conclusions were that the plan to send Wilson to investigate the Niger allegation was suggested by Wilson's wife, a CIA employee, and that in his later public statements criticizing the Bush administration, Wilson included information he had learned from press accounts, misrepresenting it as firsthand knowledge.

This additional view also discusses the question of pressure on analysts, and recommends caution in implementing reforms in the intelligence community.

=== Senators Rockefeller, Levin, and Durbin ===
Senators John D. Rockefeller (D-WV) (the Committee's vice-chairman), Carl Levin (D-MI), and Richard Durbin (D-IL), used their additional view to say that the report painted an incomplete picture, because the Committee had put off until phase two of the investigation the key question of "how intelligence on Iraq was used or misused by Administration officials in public statements and reports." Because of this, they said, "the Committee's phase one report fails to fully explain the environment of intense pressure in which Intelligence Community officials were asked to render judgments on matters relating to Iraq when policy officials had already forcefully stated their own conclusions in public."

=== Senators Chambliss, Hatch, Lott, Hagel, and Bond ===
The third additional view in the report is by Senator Saxby Chambliss (R-GA), with Senators Orrin Hatch (R-UT), Trent Lott (R-MS), Chuck Hagel (R-NE), and Christopher Bond (R-MO). It focuses on the issues of information sharing and Human Intelligence (HUMINT), and rebuts the allegation of "pressure" contained in the additional view by Senators Rockefeller, Levin, and Durbin.

=== Other additional views ===
Senator Olympia Snow (R-ME) wrote in her additional view that the Committee's report revealed poor management and a lack of accountability in the intelligence community, and she called for strong reforms.

Senator John Warner (R-VA) used his additional view to defend the integrity and professionalism of front-line intelligence analysts, and to emphasize that "there was no evidence that anyone involved in reaching intelligence judgments for this NIE was subjected to any pressure from their superiors or from policymakers to alter any of their judgments or analyses."

The additional view by Senator Dianne Feinstein (D-CA), was critical of the Bush administration, saying it "did not fairly represent the intelligence."

Senator Ron Wyden (D-OR) was also critical of the Bush administration in his additional view, giving a list of public statements by senior members of the administration that misstated and exaggerated the underlying intelligence on Iraq.

Senator Richard Durbin (D-IL) focused on the need for greater accountability for the intelligence failures identified in the report.

Senator Barbara Mikulski (D-MD) used her additional view to argue for a number of specific structural and procedural reforms in the intelligence community.

== "Phase two" of the investigation ==
At the time of the report's release (July 9, 2004), Democratic members of the committee expressed the hope that "phase two" of the investigation, which was to include an assessment of how the Iraqi WMD intelligence was used by senior policymakers, would be completed quickly. Committee Chairman Pat Roberts (R-KS) said of phase two, "It is a priority. I made my commitment and it will get done."

On March 10, 2005, during a question-and-answer session after a speech he had given at the Woodrow Wilson Center, Senator Roberts said of the failure to complete phase two, "[T]hat is basically on the back burner." Senator John D. Rockefeller (D-WV), vice chairman of the Committee, made a statement later that day in which he said, "The Chairman agreed to this investigation and I fully expect him to fulfill his commitment.... While the completion of phase two is long overdue, the committee has continued this important work, and I expect that we will finish the review in the very near future."

In a statement regarding the release of the report of the presidential WMD commission on March 31, 2005, Senator Roberts wrote, "I don't think there should be any doubt that we have now heard it all regarding prewar intelligence. I think that it would be a monumental waste of time to replow this ground any further."

On April 10, 2005, Senators Roberts and Rockefeller appeared together on NBC's Meet the Press program. In response to a question about the completion of phase two of the investigation, Roberts said, "I'm perfectly willing to do it, and that's what we agreed to do, and that door is still open. And I don't want to quarrel with Jay, because we both agreed that we would get it done. But we do have – we have Ambassador Negroponte next week, we have General Mike Hayden next week. We have other hot-spot hearings or other things going on that are very important."

Moderator Tim Russert then asked Senator Rockefeller if he believed phase two would be completed, and he replied, "I hope so. Pat and I have agreed to do it. We've shaken hands on it, and we agreed to do it after the elections so it wouldn't be any sort of sense of a political attack. I mean that was my view; it shouldn't be viewed that way."

On August 2, 2005, Senator Dianne Feinstein (D-CA) released the text of a letter she had sent to Senator Roberts, saying, in part, "I am increasingly dismayed by the delay in completing the Committee's 'Phase II' investigation into intelligence prior to the Iraq War.... I stand ready to participate in this investigation in any way possible."

On November 1, 2005, Senator Harry Reid (D-NV), the Senate minority leader, invoked a seldom-used provision of the Senate rules to place the body in a closed session. During a three-and-a-half hour discussion, agreement was reached on the creation of a six-member Senate panel to report by November 14 on "the intelligence committee's progress of the phase two review of the prewar intelligence and its schedule for completion."

On April 26, 2006, an article by journalist Alexander Bolton in the Congressional journal The Hill reported that Committee Chairman Pat Roberts (R-KS) was seeking to further divide the phase two report. Under Roberts' new approach, the following components of the report would be released relatively quickly: pre-war intelligence assessments of post-war Iraq, postwar findings in Iraq regarding WMD and ties to terrorism, and the use by US intelligence of information supplied by the Iraqi National Congress. Two components of the report would be delayed: whether public statements before the war by senior government officials were supported by the underlying intelligence, and the role played by the Department of Defense's Office of Special Plans in developing the prewar intelligence.

A September 7, 2006, article by journalist Jonathon Weisman in the Washington Post reported that the part of the phase two report comparing the Bush administration's public statements about Saddam Hussein with the evidence senior officials reviewed in private would not be released before the November 2006 election.

Two volumes of the phase II report were released on September 8, 2006: "Postwar Findings about Iraq's WMD Programs and Links to Terrorism and How they Compare with Prewar Assessments" and "The Use by the Intelligence Community of Information Provided by the Iraqi National Congress."

After Democrats gained a majority in the Senate during the 2006 midterm election, chairmanship of the committee passed to Sen. Jay Rockefeller (D-WV). The former chair, Sen. Pat Roberts (R-KS) left the committee; the ranking Republican and vice chairman of the committee is now Sen. Kit Bond (R-MO).

On May 25, 2007, the committee released a volume of the phase II report titled, "Prewar Intelligence Assessments About Postwar Iraq ". This volume of the report includes seven pages of conclusions regarding assessments provided by the intelligence community to U.S. government leaders prior to the Iraq war. The report concludes that the intelligence community had assessed that establishing a stable government in Iraq would be a "long, difficult, and probably turbulent challenge," that Iraqi society was deeply divided and would engage in violent conflict unless an occupying power took steps to prevent it, and that the war would increase the threat of terrorism, at least temporarily. The intelligence community also assessed that a U.S. defeat and occupation of Iraq would lead to a surge in political Islam and increased funding for terrorist groups, and that the war would not cause other countries in the region to abandon their WMD programs.

This volume of the report includes an appendix containing two previously classified reports by the National Intelligence Council (NIC) titled, "Regional Consequences of Regime Change in Iraq" and "Principal Challenges in Post-Saddam Iraq", as well as a long list of recipients within the government of NIC assessments on Iraq. The appendix also contains a number of "Additional Views" in which different members of the committee comment on the history of the committee's work in this area, and criticize what they characterize as the politicization of that work by members of the other party.

Phase II of the report was publicly released on Thursday June 5, 2008 whether statements by US Government officials were substantiated by intelligence reports.

This was a bi-partisan majority report (10-5) and "details inappropriate, sensitive intelligence activities conducted by the DoD's Office of the Undersecretary of Defense for Policy, without the knowledge of the Intelligence Community or the State Department." It concludes that the US Administration "repeatedly presented intelligence as fact when in reality it was unsubstantiated, contradicted, or even non-existent. As a result, the American people were led to believe that the threat from Iraq was much greater than actually existed." These included President Bush's statements of a partnership between Iraq and Al Qa'ida, that Saddam Hussein was preparing to give weapons of mass destruction to terrorist groups, and Iraq's capability to produce chemical weapons.

The Chairman of the Senate Select Committee on Intelligence, Sen.Jay Rockefeller, stated in press release of report's publication "It is my belief that the Bush Administration was fixated on Iraq, and used the 9/11 attacks by al Qa'ida as justification for overthrowing Saddam Hussein. To accomplish this, top Administration officials made repeated statements that falsely linked Iraq and al Qa'ida as a single threat and insinuated that Iraq played a role in 9/11. Sadly, the Bush Administration led the nation into war under false pretenses. While the report highlights many of the problems with the intelligence and criticizes the Bush Administration for its handling of the lead up to the war and its reasons for doing so, the report also supports in many cases that claims made by the Bush Administration about Iraq's Weapons of Mass Destruction programs were "generally substantiated by the intelligence".

"There is no question we all relied on flawed intelligence. But, there is a fundamental difference between relying on incorrect intelligence and deliberately painting a picture to the American people that you know is not fully accurate."

The Chairman of the Senate Select Committee on Intelligence, Sen.Jay Rockefeller twice alleged that the Office of the Under Secretary of Defense for Policy, or its former head Douglas Feith may have engaged in unlawful activities, Phase II of the report "found nothing to substantiate that claim; nothing unlawful about the "alleged" rogue intelligence operation in the PCTEG, nothing unlawful about the Office of Special Plans, and nothing unlawful about the so-called failure to inform Congress of alleged intelligence activities." The previous year, the chairman released a press statement claiming that it appeared that the office's were "not in compliance with the law." Yet, rather than pursue these allegations, Rockfeller decided to pursue an issue unrelated to the intelligence, and unrelated to Iraq. He pursued and inquiry of an exploratory meeting held in Rome in 2001 between two DOD officials and two Iranians. Writing for the Minority Opinion as part of the report it was stated that "After four years of making unsubstantiated allegations of unlawful activities, the calculus appears to be that proclamations of "inappropriate" behavior will generate the desired headlines focusing only on the caustic words, rather than the lack of substance behind them. We hope that these additional views will help redirect that focus to the evidence, or lack thereof."

Despite House Speaker Nancy Pelosi's telling her caucus members "that impeachment is off the table; she is not interested in pursuing it," Dennis Kucinich D-Ohio introduced a formal resolution to the House of Representatives in an attempt to impeach President George W. Bush from the White House. House Democrats unanimously voted to send it to a committee; a maneuver that essentially killed Kucinich's efforts.

== See also ==
- Butler Review
- Iraq and weapons of mass destruction
- Iraq disarmament crisis
- Iraq Intelligence Commission
- United Nations Security Council and the Iraq War
