= Abu Qutaibah al Majali =

Jordanian al-Qaeda member

Abdel Majid al-Majali (Arabic: عبد المجيد المجالي) Also known as Abu Qutaibah al Majali (Arabic: أبو قتيبة المجالي) and Abu Qutayba al-Ordony (Arabic: أبو قتيبة الأردني) is a Salafi jihadist from Al Karak who recruited Abu Musab al-Zarqawi to fight in Afghanistan. He was one of participants in the Afghan Arabs, and the manager of Maktab al-Khidamat in Jordan. his older son qutaibah is fighting with Islamic State of Iraq and the Levant and his other son Yusef returned from fighting with ISIS. He was arrested in 2014 because of encouraging people to fight with ISIS. Some Jordanian writers claimed that his jihadist activities was linked with 2016 Al-Karak attack.

== See also ==
- Osama bin Laden
- Abdullah Azzam
