= Standard Arabic Technical Transliteration System =

The Standard Arabic Technical Transliteration System, commonly referred to by its acronym SATTS, is a system for writing and transmitting Arabic language text using the one-for-one substitution of ASCII-range characters for the letters of the Arabic alphabet. Unlike more common systems for transliterating Arabic, SATTS does not provide the reader with any more phonetic information than standard Arabic orthography does; that is, it provides the bare Arabic alphabetic spelling with no notation of short vowels, doubled consonants, etc. In other words, it is intended as a transliteration tool for Arabic linguists, and is of limited use to those who do not know Arabic.

SATTS, a legacy of Morse and teleprinter systems (see "Background," below), has historically been employed by military and communications elements of Western countries for handling Arabic text without the need for native fonts or special software. Although its use has decreased in recent years with the demise of Morse code and the obsolescence of the teleprinter, and with the increased availability of native-font software, it is still used for the quick and handy platform-independent recording and transmission of Arabic terms and text.

== Format ==
SATTS employs all the Latin alphabetic letters except P, plus four punctuation marks, for a total of 29 symbols (all the letters of the Arabic alphabet, plus the glottal-stop symbol hamzah).

== Table of SATTS equivalents ==
ا	'alif	A
ب	bā'	B
ت	tā'	T
ث	thā'	C
ج	jīm	J
ح	ħā'	H
خ	khā'	O
د	dāl	D

ذ	dhāl	Z
ر	rā'	R
ز	zayn	;
س	sīn	S
ش	shīn	:
ص	ṣād	X
ض	ḍād	V
ط	ţā'	U

ظ	Ðā'	Y
ع	`ayn	"
غ	γayn	G
ف	fā'	F
ق	qāf	Q
ك	kāf	K
ل	lām	L
م	mīm	M

ن	nūn	N
ه	hā'	?
ة	tā' marbūţah	?
و	wāw	W
ؤ	wāw with hamzah	WE
ي or ى	yā'	I
ئ	hamzah	IE
ﺀ	hamzah	E

In some words, lām 'alif was sent as a single character •—••••— or LA as a single character. The symbol for the glottal stop hamzah (ء) is written following its seat, if it has one. It is omitted when it occurs with an initial 'alif. RIEIS رئيس MAEDB? مأدبة MSWEWL مسؤول BDE بدء AHMD أحمد ASLAM إسلام

== Sample text ==
Native orthography	SATTS transliteration
جامعة الدول العربية هي منظمة تضم دولا في الشرق الأوسط وأفريقيا	JAM"? ALDWL AL"RBI? ?I MNYM? TVM DWLA FI AL:RQ ALAWSU WAFRIQIA

The chief deficiencies of SATTS are that it does not distinguish between hā' (ه) and tā' marbūţah (ة), or between final yā' (ي) and 'alif maksūrah (ى), and it cannot depict an 'alif maddah ( آ ). SATTS also cannot distinguish between a final seated hamza and a final independent hamza, if the word ends in "AE", "IE", or "WE".

== Background ==
The Latin alphabetic letter employed for each Arabic letter in the SATTS system is its Morse-code equivalent. For example, Morse code for the Arabic letter ţā' (ط) is • • — (dit-dit-dah). That same Morse code sequence represents the letter U in the Latin alphabet. Hence the SATTS equivalent for ţā' is U.

In the Morse-code era, when Arabic language Morse signals were copied down by non-Arab code clerks, the text came out in SATTS. Text in SATTS was also automatically produced when teleprinters reproduced Arabic text, if the technician had failed to replace the printer's Latin-character pallet with an Arabic-character one.
