= Abdul Hadi Daghlas =

Jordanian al-Qaeda member

Abdul Hadi Daghlas, known as Abu Taisir, was a Jordanian man and a relative of Abu Musab al-Zarqawi. He was Zarqawi's top lieutenant in Iraq.

== History ==
He traveled to the Khurmal camp in Iraqi Kurdistan from Tehran, Iran. The Central Intelligence Agency traced his satellite phone and located him.

== Death ==
On the second day of the 2003 invasion of Iraq, more than 40 American cruise missiles hit the town of Khurmal in Iraqi Kurdistan. Abdul Hadi Daghlas was among the dead.
