= Roger Cressey =

American cyber security and counter-terrorism expert (born 1965)

Roger W. Cressey
- Born: August 9, 1965
- Education: The University of Massachusetts Lowell (B.A.,1987); George Washington University (M.A.,1991)
- Employer(s): Georgetown University (adjunct Professor of counter-terrorism policy); Good Harbor consulting group (President)
- Known for: Counterterrorism

Roger W. Cressey (born August 9, 1965) is a cyber security and counter-terrorism expert and served in senior positions under presidents Bill Clinton and George W. Bush. He is a former member of the United States National Security Council staff and the founder and former president of the Good Harbor consulting group.

Cressey served as an adjunct professor of counter-terrorism policy at Georgetown University and is currently a Partner with Liberty Group Ventures, LLC.

== Education and early life ==
Cressey received his Bachelor of Arts in Political Science from the University of Massachusetts Lowell in 1987 and a Master of Arts in Security Policy Studies from George Washington University in 1991.

He has taught a graduate course on U.S. counter-terrorism policy at Georgetown University, where he served as an adjunct professor from 2000-2006.

== Career ==
Cressey worked at the Department of Defense, including as deputy director for War Plans. From 1991 to 1995, he served in the Department of State, working on Middle East Security issues. He has also served overseas with the U.S. Embassy in Israel and with United Nations peacekeeping missions in Somalia and former Yugoslavia.

He was chief of staff to the President's Critical Infrastructure Protection Board at the White House from November 2001 to September 2002.

From November 1999 to November 2001, he was Director for Transnational Threats on the National Security Council (NSC) staff, where he was responsible for the coordination and implementation of US counter-terrorism policy. During this period, he managed the U.S. Government's response to the Millennium terror alert, the USS Cole attack, and the September 11 attacks. During his time at the NSC, Cressey called for steps to be taken against al-Qaeda and Bin Laden, which were largely ignored until 9/11.

In 2002, Cressey founded the corporate security and risk management company Good Harbor Consulting.

He has also served as a foreign policy advisor to President Barack Obama.

For more than ten years Cressey was an on-air counter-terrorism analyst for NBC News, regularly appearing on NBC Nightly News, The Today Show, MSNBC and CNBC and other national and international print and non-print media outlets. He has also been speaking on his topics of expertise at different forums, conferences and panels.

Cressey served as senior vice president at Booz Allen Hamilton, a technology consulting firm, where he worked on cybersecurity projects in the Middle East.

He is currently a Partner with Mountain Wave Ventures.

== Awards ==
Cressey has been awarded the State Department's Meritorious and Superior Honor Awards, and the Secretary of Defense Exceptional Civilian Service Award.
