= Hibhib =

Hibhib (Arabic: هبهب)
- Town
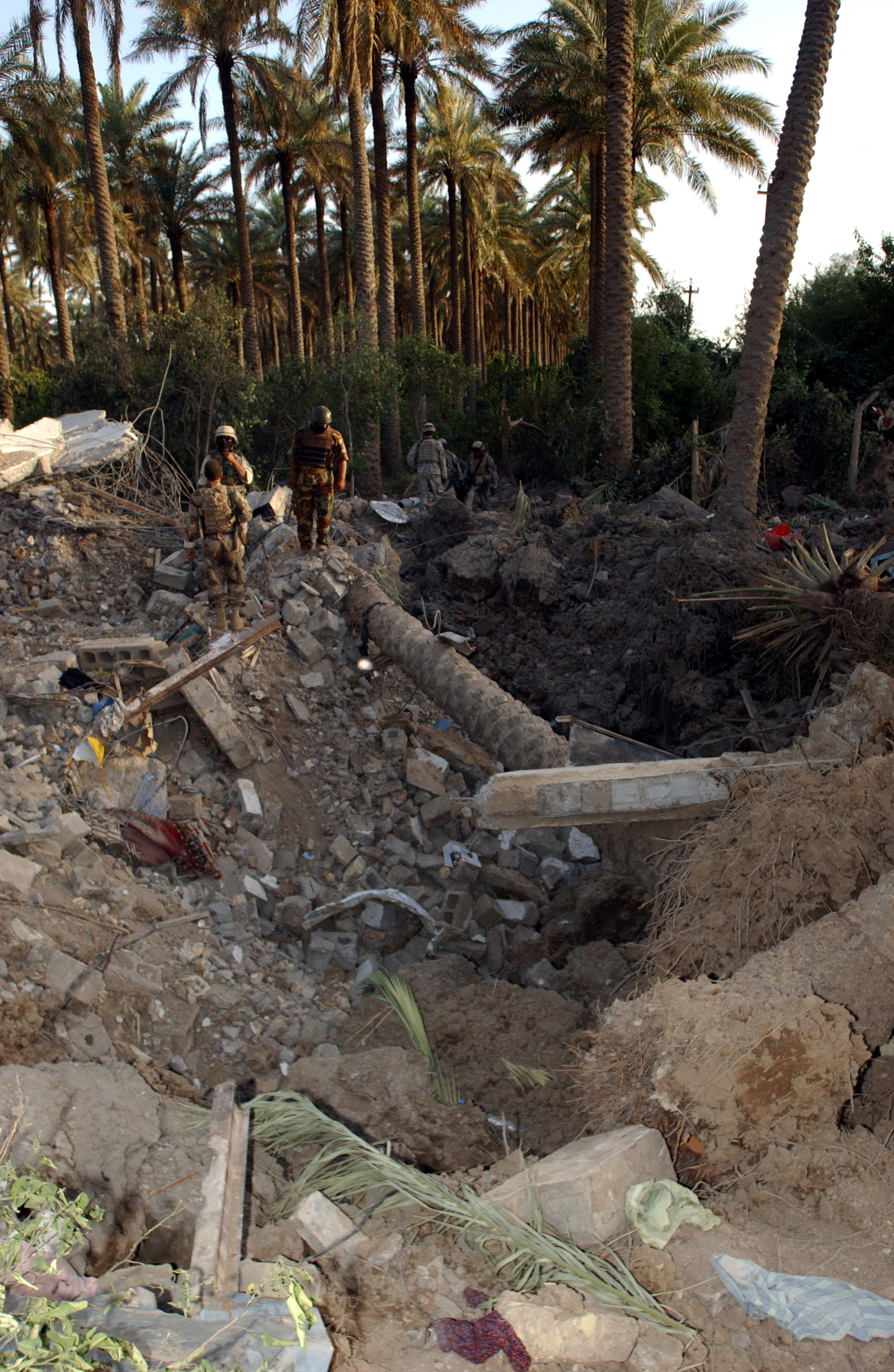
- U.S. Army 3rd Heavy Brigade Combat Team, 4th Infantry Division Public Affairs Office at the site of Abu Musab al-Zarqawi's bombed out safe house on June 8, 2006

- Hibhib's location inside Iraq
- Coordinates: 33°47′N 44°30′E
- Country: Iraq
- Governorate: Diyala
- District: Khalis
- Time zone: UTC+3 (Arabian Time)

Hibhib (Arabic: ناحية هبهب, Hibhib Village) is a village in Iraq, located 8 km (5.0 mi) northwest of Baquba. It is predominantly Sunni Muslim Arab.

== History ==
The former leader of Al-Qaeda in Iraq, who was the Jordanian-born militant Abu Musab al-Zarqawi, maintained a safehouse in the village. On June 7, 2006, while meeting in the safehouse with his spiritual adviser, he was bombed and killed by U.S.-led coalition aircraft.
