= Colin Powell's presentation to the United Nations Security Council =

2003 diplomatic speech

- Part of the lead-up to the Iraq War
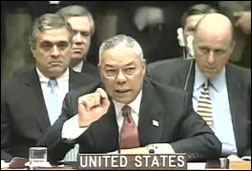
- Colin Powell holding up a model vial of the supposed weaponized anthrax.
- Date: February 5, 2003
- Time: 10:30 a.m. (Eastern Time Zone)
- Venue: United Nations Security Council at the headquarters of the United Nations
- Location: Manhattan, New York City
- Type: PowerPoint presentation
- Theme: Rationale for the Iraq War
- Outcome: Invasion of Iraq, U.S. reputation damage, Powell accused of having lied
- The full text of the presentation at Wikisource

On February 5, 2003, the secretary of state of the United States Colin Powell gave a PowerPoint presentation to the United Nations Security Council asserting that Iraq was in violation of UN Security Resolution 1441 and was in the process of producing chemical weapons of mass destruction. Powell stated that Iraq had repeatedly refused to work with inspectors from UNMOVIC and IAEA and citing U.S. intelligence reports, was producing WMD's and was involved with terrorism, all in violation of Resolution 1441.

UN secretary-general Kofi Annan called the presentation strong and thorough, urged Iraqi leadership to comply with Resolution 1441, and stated that he did not think war was inevitable. The validity of the cited intelligence reports was called into question with Powell later stating his speech was a "great intelligence failure" and calling it a "blot" on his reputation.

== Selection and preparation ==
On February 5, 2003, Powell appeared before the UN to prove the urgency to engage a war with Iraq. In 2016, Powell would say, "[A]t the time I gave the speech on Feb. 5, the president had already made this decision for military action." Powell was selected to deliver the speech based on his credibility, and he stated in 2016 that it had been written by the vice president's office:

The speech supposedly had been prepared in the White House in the United States National Security Council. But when we were given what had been prepared, it was totally inadequate, and we couldn't track anything in it. When I asked Condoleezza Rice, the national security advisor, where did this come from, it turns out the vice president's office had written it.

CIA analyst Nada Bakos has stated that the speech's language differed from what the CIA prepared for Powell and from the copies the CIA received in advance of the presentation.

== Content ==
My second purpose today is ... to share with you what the United States knows about Iraq's weapons of mass destruction ... Iraq's behavior demonstrate that Saddam Hussein and his regime have made no effort ... to disarm as required by the international community. Indeed, the facts and Iraq's behavior show that Saddam Hussein and his regime are concealing their efforts to produce more weapons of mass destruction ... every statement I make today is backed up by sources, solid sources. These are not assertions. What we're giving you are facts and conclusions based on solid intelligence.

— Colin Powell, Address to the United Nations Security Council

Powell claimed that Iraq harbored a terrorist network headed by al-Qaeda operative Abu Musab al-Zarqawi (in a small region controlled by Ansar al-Islam). He also claimed that Iraqis visited Osama bin Laden in Afghanistan and provided training to al-Qaeda members, although thousands of Arabs from many countries did the same. US intelligence agencies have found no evidence of any substantive collaboration between Saddam Hussein and al-Qaeda.

=== Slides ===
Iraq Failing To Disarm

Iraq Is Hiding Evidence

Iraq Is Muzzling Its Scientists

Iraq Is Hiding Dangerous Weapons

Iraq Still Seeks Nuclear Weapons

Iraq Is Harboring Terrorists, Including Al Qaida

Iraq Has Refused To Disarm Peacefully

== Reactions ==
=== Iraqi reaction ===
Mohammed Aldouri, Iraqi ambassador to the UN denied the allegation saying they were "utterly unrelated to the truth."

Ansar al Islam invited 20 journalists to a compound that should have been a 'poison factory'.

=== Others ===
Although the presentation failed to change the fundamental position of the Security Council, including France, Russia, China, and Germany, Powell succeeded in hardening the overall tone of the United Nations towards Iraq. While Colin Powell's statement to the UN may have been accepted as proof by many in the US, this was not the case in Europe.

Powell's Chief of Staff Lawrence Wilkerson later said that he had inadvertently participated in a hoax on the American people in preparing Powell's erroneous testimony before the United Nations Security Council.

== Analysis ==
David Zarefsky noted that the speech mainly relied on the argument from ignorance.

The Guardian dubbed the speech a decisive moment in undermining the credibility of the United States.

The New York Times Magazine considered the speech one of the most indelible public moments of the Bush administration.

FAIR analyzed the media coverage of the week before and the week after the presentation and urged the media to broaden their coverage.

== Further developments ==
In a 2005 ABC News interview, Powell called his UN speech a "Lasting Blot on His Record," stating that it was "devastating" to learn that some intelligence agents knew that the sources were unreliable but did not speak up. Still, Powell reiterated that he did not lie because he did not know the information was false: "I, of course, regret the U.N. speech that I gave, which became the prominent presentation of our case. But we thought it was correct at the time. The President thought it was correct. Congress thought it was correct." "Of course I regret that a lot of it turned out be wrong".

"There were some people in the intelligence community who knew at that time that some of these sources were not good, and shouldn't be relied upon, and they didn't speak up. That devastated me."

— Colin Powell, September 9, 2005

== See also ==
- Media coverage of the Iraq War
- National Security Strategy (United States) § 2002 NSS
- Mission Accomplished speech
- Nayirah testimony
- Powell Doctrine
- Anthrax weaponization
- Lady R incident
- Foreign policy of the George W. Bush administration
- United States and the United Nations
