= Mark Urban =

British journalist (born 1961)

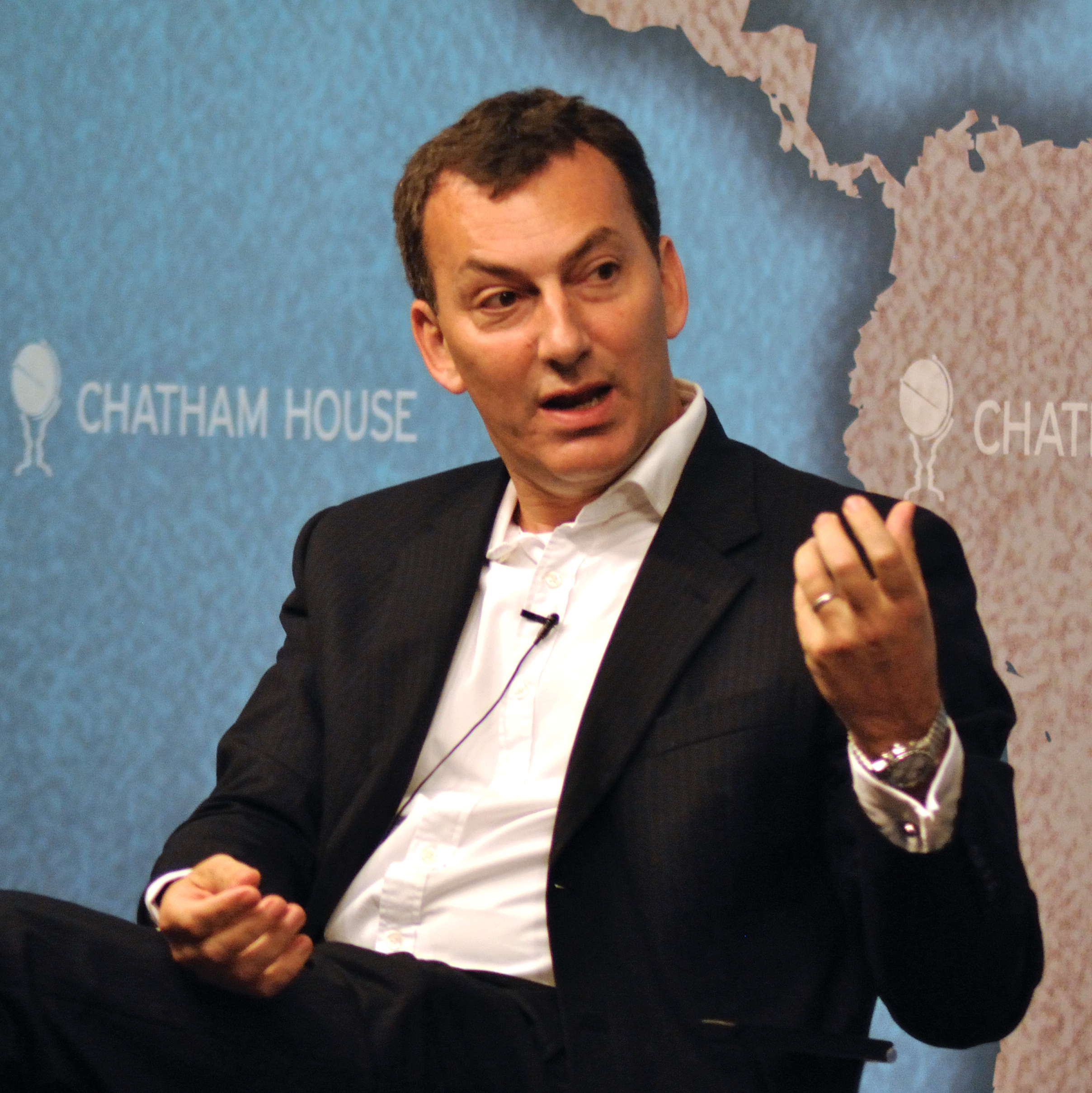
- Mark Urban at Chatham House in 2011
- Born: Mark Lee Urban; 26 January 1961 (age 65)
- Occupations: Journalist, military historian

Mark Lee Urban (born 26 January 1961) is a British journalist, historian, and broadcaster. He is a writer and commentator for The Sunday Times, specialising in defence and foreign affairs. Until May 2024 he was Diplomatic Editor and occasional presenter for BBC Two's Newsnight.

== Education and early career ==
Urban, whose father Garri came from Poland, is the younger brother of film and television director Stuart Urban. He grew up in Wimbledon, south London.

Urban attended the London School of Economics, prior to which he served in the Royal Tank Regiment as an officer holding a Short Service Limited Commission lasting 1 year. The Short Service Limited Commission was a paid pre-university gap-year commission offered by the British Army. He subsequently served four years in the Territorial Army.

== Correspondent career ==
Urban joined the BBC in 1983 as an assistant producer, working on several BBC news programmes. From 1986 to 1990 he was the defence correspondent of The Independent, before rejoining the BBC as a general reporter on Newsnight. From 1993 to 1994 he was Middle East correspondent for BBC News, before becoming Newsnight's diplomatic editor, a role he held from 1995 until leaving the BBC at the end of May 2024. He has since written on diplomacy, defence and security for The Sunday Times. In his years on Newsnight, he reported on the Gulf War, the Bosnian War, War in Kosovo, the War in Afghanistan and War in Iraq. After the 2018 Amesbury poisonings Urban reported that he had been working with Sergei Skripal up to a year before the poisoning of Sergei and Yulia Skripal in Salisbury.

== Military historian ==
In 1992, Urban published Big Boys' Rules: The SAS and the secret struggle against the IRA on killings by British Army and Royal Ulster Constabulary undercover units in Northern Ireland between 1976 and 1987. The book, which was subject to censorship by the D-Notice Committee, was described by John Stalker as "deep and meticulous delving into a secret war".

In 2010, he published Task Force Black: The Explosive True Story of the SAS and the Secret War in Iraq, described as a "ground-breaking investigation" and which required months of negotiations with the Ministry of Defence, which had tried to prevent publication.

== Books ==
- Soviet Land Power (1985) ISBN 9780711014428
- War in Afghanistan (1987) ISBN 9780333514771
- Big Boys' Rules: The SAS and the secret struggle against the IRA (1992) ISBN 9780571168095
- UK Eyes Alpha: Inside British Intelligence (1996) ISBN 9780571190683
- The Man Who Broke Napoleon's Codes: The Story of George Scovell (2001) ISBN 9780571205387
- Rifles: Six Years with Wellington's Legendary Sharpshooters (2003) ISBN 9780802714374
- Generals: Ten British Commanders Who Shaped the World (2005) ISBN 9780571224876
- Fusiliers: Eight Years with the Redcoats in America (2007) ISBN 9780571224883
- Task Force Black: The Explosive True Story of the Secret Special Forces War in Iraq (2011) ISBN 9780312541279
- The Tank War: The British Band of Brothers – One Tank Regiment's World War II (2014) ISBN 9781408703632
- The Edge: Is The Military Dominance Of The West Coming To An End? (2015) ISBN 9781408705834
- The Skripal Files: The Life and Near Death of a Russian Spy (2018) ISBN 9781250207739
- Tank: The 10 War Machines That Changed the World and the Remarkable Men Behind Them (2025) ISBN 9780241741504

Media offices
Unknown	Diplomatic Editor: Newsnight; 1995–2024	Unknown
