= Combatants of the Iraq War =

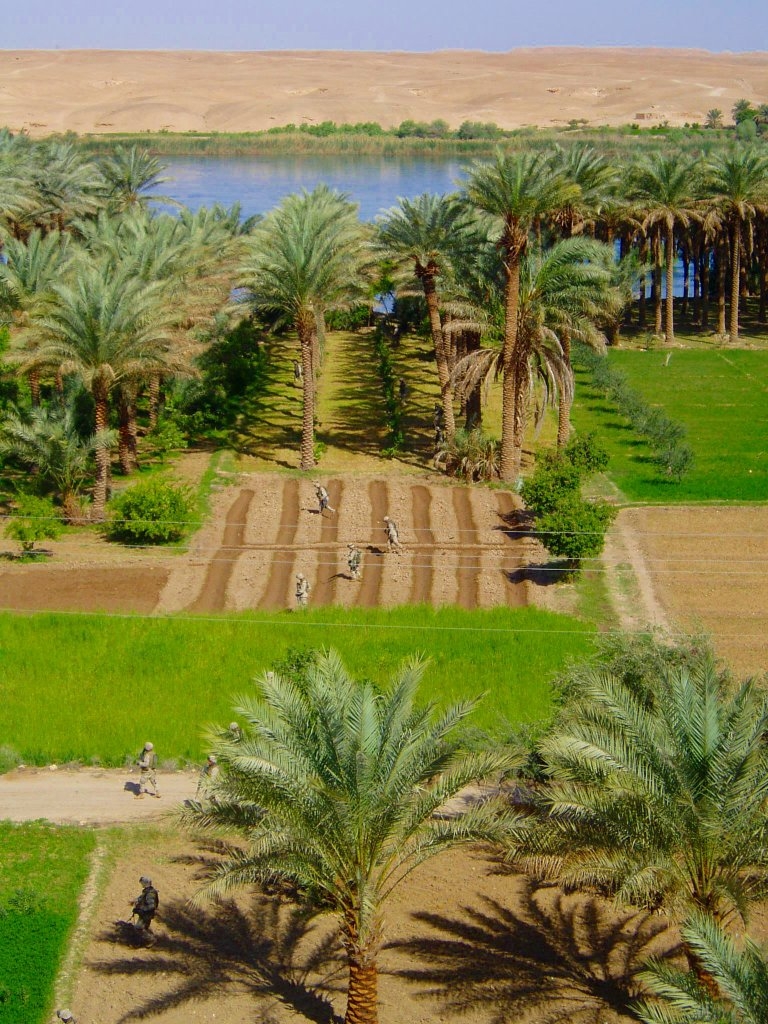
U.S. Marines in Iraq along the Euphrates River, 2005

The combatants of the Iraq War include the Multinational Force in Iraq and armed Iraqi insurgent groups. Below is a list of armed groups or combatants that participated in the Iraq War of 2003–2011.

== Invasion ==
United States and allies	Ba'athist Iraq	Islamic Emirate of Kurdistan
United States; United Kingdom; Australia; Poland; Military support: Iraqi National Congress (Kurdistan Region) Peshmerga: Kurdistan Democratic Party; Patriotic Union of Kurdistan	Ba'athist Iraq: Iraqi Armed Forces; Fedayeen Saddam; Arab volunteers	Ansar al-Islam

== Post-invasion ==
United States and allies	Sunni insurgents	Shi'a insurgents
Iraq: Iraqi Armed Forces; Sons of Iraq (05-11); Qaraqosh Protection Committee (08-11); Iraqi Kurdistan: Peshmerga; Kurdistan Workers' Party; Kurdistan Freedom Falcons (04-11); PJAK (07-11); Sinjar Alliance; Êzîdxan Protection Force; Sinjar Resistance Units; Êzidxan Women's Units; Malik Al-Tawus Troop (07-11); Multi-National Force – Iraq (04-11): United States (03-11); United Kingdom (03-11); Australia (03-09); Romania (03-09); El Salvador (03-09); Estonia (05-09); Bulgaria (03-08); Moldova (03-08); Albania (03-08); Ukraine (03-08); Denmark (03-08); Czech Republic (03-08); South Korea (03-08); Japan (04-08); Tonga (04-08); Azerbaijan (03-08); Singapore (03-08); Bosnia and Herzegovina (05-08); Republic of Macedonia (03-08); Latvia (03-08); Poland (03-08); Kazakhstan (03-08); Armenia (05-08); Mongolia (03-08); Georgia (03-08); Slovakia (03-07); Lithuania (03-07); Italy (03-06); Norway (03-06); Hungary (03-05); Netherlands (03-05); Portugal (03-05); New Zealand (03-04); Thailand (03-04); Philippines (03-04); Honduras (03-04); Dominican Republic (03-04); Spain (03-04); Nicaragua (03-04); Iceland (03)	Sunni insurgents: Ansar al-Islam (2003 – 2011); Jama'at al-Tawhid wal-Jihad (2003 –2004); Wakefulness and Holy War (2003); Jamaat Ansar al-Sunna (2003 - 2007); Islamic Army in Iraq (03-11); 1920 Revolution Brigade (03-11); Army of the Men of the Naqshbandi Order (06-11); Jaish al-Rashideen (03-11); Jaish al-Ta'ifa al-Mansurah (2004 - 2006); Jamaat Jaysh Ahl al-Sunnah wa-l-Jamaah (2004 - 2006); al-Qaeda in Iraq (2004 - 2006); Black Banner Organization (04-11); Abu Theeb's group; Abu Bakr Al-Salafi Army (2003 - 2011); Mujahideen Army (2004- 2011); Mujahideen Shura Council (Iraq) (2006); Islamic State of Iraq (2006 - 11); Jaysh al-Fatiheen	Shi'a insurgents: Mahdi Army (03-08); Abu Deraa's militia (03-08); Badr Organization (03-11); Islamic Supreme Council of Iraq (03-11); Sheibani Network (03-11); Soldiers of Heaven (03-11); Asa'ib Ahl al-Haq (06-11); Promised Day Brigades (08-11); Kata'ib Hezbollah (03-11)

== Spillover ==
=== Syria ===
(Ba'athist Syria) Syrian government and allies	Syrian opposition and allies Al-Qaeda and allies	Islamic State of Iraq and the Levant
(Ba'athist Syria) Syrian government: Syrian Arab Armed Forces; National Defence Forces; Popular Mobilization Forces: Badr Organization; Kata'ib Hezbollah; Peace Companies; Kata'ib Sayyid al-Shuhada; Kata'ib al-Imam Ali; Asa'ib Ahl al-Haq; Hezbollah; Iran: Islamic Revolutionary Guard Corps; Islamic Republic of Iran Army; 65th Airborne Special Forces Brigade; Liwa Fatemiyoun	Syrian opposition: (Syrian opposition) Free Syrian Army; Islamic Front (until 2015); Al-Qaeda: Al-Nusra Front (until 2016); Jund al-Aqsa (until 2016); Turkistan Islamic Party; Tehrik-i-Taliban Pakistan; Jabhat Ansar al-Din	Islamic State of Iraq and the Levant: Military of ISIL

== Coalition troop deployment ==
Distinctive unit insignia of the Multinational Force Iraq (MNF-I)

The Multinational Force in Iraq is a military command led by the United States fighting the Iraq War against Iraqi insurgents. "Multi-National Force — Iraq" replaced the previous force, Combined Joint Task Force 7, on May 15, 2004. The media in the U.S. has used the term U.S.-led coalition to describe this force, as around 93% of the troops are from the United States. Due to the expiration of the UN authorization on foreign troops in Iraq, the end of 2008 was supposed to mark the end of the Multinational Force in Iraq force with all of the remaining coalition partners withdrawing their armed forces. On July 28, 2009, Australian troops departed Iraq, leaving only U.S. troops operating in MNF-I, under the U.S.-Iraq Status of Forces Agreement.

=== Troop numbers ===
As of September 2009, all non-U.S. coalition countries have withdrawn their troops.

- United States – 128,000

=== United Nations ===
The United Nations deployed a small contingent to Iraq to protect UN staff and guard their compounds. The U.N. mandate for this force expires in August 2009.

United Nations Assistance Mission in Iraq (UNAMI)

- Fiji: 219 blue-helmets
- Denmark: 2 military observers
- New Zealand – 1 military observer
- United Kingdom – 1 military observer
- Austria – 1 military observer

=== NATO ===
Several NATO member-states have deployed instructors to Iraq to train Iraqi security and military forces in conjunction with the MNF: NATO Training Mission - Iraq (NTM-I).

== Armed Iraqi groups ==
The Iraqi insurgency is the armed insurgency, by diverse groups, including private militias, within Iraq opposed to the US led occupation and the U.S.-supported Iraqi government. The fighting has clear sectarian overtones and significant international implications (see Civil war in Iraq.) This campaign has been called the Iraqi resistance by its supporters and the anti-Iraqi forces (AIF) by Coalition forces.

=== Insurgents ===
Most of the insurgent attacks are against Coalition forces.

By fall 2003 these insurgent groups began using typical guerrilla tactics: ambushes, bombings, kidnappings, sniper attacks and the use of IEDs. Other actions include mortars and suicide attacks, explosively formed penetrators, small arms fire, anti-aircraft missiles (SA-7, SA-14, SA-16) and RPGs. The insurgents also conduct sabotage against the oil, water, and electrical infrastructure of Iraq. Coalition statistics (see detailed BBC graphic) show that the insurgents primarily targeted coalition forces, Iraqi security forces and infrastructure, and lastly civilians and government officials. These irregular forces favored attacking unarmored or lightly armored Humvee vehicles, the U.S. military's primary transport vehicle, primarily through the use of roadside IED. Insurgent groups such as the al-Abud Network have also attempted to constitute their own chemical weapons programs, trying to weaponise traditional mortar rounds with ricin and mustard toxin.

There is evidence that some guerrilla groups are organised on a large scale, most likely by the Fedayeen Saddam, Ba'ath loyalists, religious radicals and nationalist Iraqis that are angered by the occupation.

=== Militias ===
Two of the most powerful current militias are the Mahdi Army and the Badr Organization, with both militias having substantial political support in the current Iraqi government. Initially, both organisations were involved in the Iraqi insurgency, most clearly seen with the Mahdi Army at the Battle of Najaf. However, in recent months, there has been a split between the two groups.

This violent break between Muqtada al-Sadr's Mahdi Army and the rival Badr Organization of Abdul Aziz al-Hakim, seen in the fighting in the town of Amarah on October 20, 2006, would severely complicate the efforts of Iraqi and US officials to quell the soaring violence.

More recently in late 2005 and 2006, due to increasing sectarian violence based on either tribal/ethnic distinctions or simply due to increased criminal violence, various militias have formed, with whole neighborhoods and cities sometimes being protected or attacked by ethnic or neighborhood militias. One such group, known as the Anbar Awakening, was formed in September 2006 to fight against Al Qaeda and other radical Islamist groups, in the particularly violent Anbar province. Led by Sheik and Abdul Sattar Buzaigh al-Rishawi, who heads the Sunni Anbar Salvation Council, the Anbar Awakening has more than 60,000 troops and is seen by key US officials such as Condoleezza Rice as a potential ally to US occupation forces.

=== Al-Qaeda in Iraq ===
Al-Qaeda is a group which is playing an active role in the Iraqi insurgency. The group was led by Abu Musab al-Zarqawi until his death in 2006; it is now believed to be led by Abu Hamza al-Muhajir (aka Abu Ayyub al-Masri.)

== Lesser known groups ==
There are more minor groups that were involved in the Iraqi insurgency such as:

. Al Qassas Brigades

. Asaib al Iraq al Jihadiya

. Hamas of Iraq

. Islamic Group in Iraq

. Islamic Movement of Iraqi Mujahideen

. Jaish al Mujahideen al Murabitun

. Jaish al Muslimeen,

. Jaish al Mustafa

. Shield of Islam Brigades

. Kataib Jund al Tawhid

. Kataib Siham al Haq

. Mujahideen Brigades of Western Region

. Saad Bin Abi Waqas Army

. Saraya Dawa Wal Rabat

. Islamic Front for the Iraqi Resistance

. Supreme Command for Jihad and Liberation

== See also ==
- List of armed groups in the War in Iraq (2013–2017)
- Belligerents in the Syrian civil war
- List of armed groups in the Yemeni Civil War
- List of armed groups in the Second Libyan Civil War
- List of armed groups in the Syrian civil war spillover in Lebanon
