= History of the Islamic State =

The origins of the Islamic State can be traced back to three main organizations. Earliest of these was the "Jamāʻat al-Tawḥīd wa-al-Jihād" (transl. "The Organisation of Tawhid and Jihad") organization, founded by the Jihadist leader Abu Mus'ab al-Zarqawi in Jordan in 1999. Although the other two predecessor organizations emerged during the Iraqi insurgency against the U.S. occupation forces which included the "Jaish al-Ta'ifa al-Mansurah" (transl. "Army of the Victorious Sect") group founded by Abu Omar al-Baghdadi in 2004 and the "Jaysh Ahl al-Sunnah wa’l-Jama’ah" (transl. "Army of Ahlus Sunnah wal Jama'ah") group founded by Abu Bakr al-Baghdadi and his associates in the same year, the modern iteration of the Islamic State was formed after the U.S. occupational forces outlawed the Iraqi branch of the Arab Socialist Ba'ath Party putting the Sunni soldiers and bureaucrats out of work.

The group went through a number of name changes as it declared itself not just an organization but a state, and then declared itself as a worldwide caliphate. In 2004, it became Tanẓīm Qāʻidat al-Jihād fī Bilād al-Rāfidayn, commonly known as al-Qaeda in Iraq (AQI), when al-Zarqawi gave bay'ah to Osama bin Laden and al-Qaeda. The same year, Abu Omar al-Baghdadi and Abu Bakr al-Baghdadi established the "Jaish al-Ta'ifa al-Mansurah" (JTM) and "Jaysh Ahl al-Sunnah wa’l-Jama’ah" (JASJ) groups which were allied to al-Qaeda during the early Iraqi insurgency. In January 2006, various Islamist insurgent groups (including AQI, JTM and JASJ) formed a coalition known as the Mujahideen Shura Council (MSM).

A few months after the death of al-Zarqawi in June 2006, MSM announced its dissolution and declared the establishment of an independent organization known as the "Islamic State of Iraq" (ISI), under the leadership of Abu Omar al-Baghdadi. ISI participated in the Iraqi insurgency between 2006 and 2011 that sought the end of US occupation of Iraq. In 2010, Abu Omar al-Baghdadi was killed during a military raid by US forces near Tikrit, paving the way for the succession of Abu Bakr al-Baghdadi, who became the second Emir of ISI.

In 2013, Abu Bakr al-Baghdadi declared his intention to forcibly merge Al-Nusra Front (which it claimed to have established and supported) with ISI and announced the formation of "Islamic State of Iraq and the Levant". Al-Qaeda Emir Ayman al-Zawahiri denounced the merger proposal and demanded the abolishment of the new organization, publicly declaring that Al-Nusra Front was the branch of al-Qaeda in Syria. Zawahiri's mediation was rejected by al-Baghdadi, resulting in the eruption of armed conflict between IS and al-Qaeda and its allies. In 2014, IS proclaimed itself a worldwide caliphate and changed its name to the Islamic State which in a year grew to control territory with a population of millions. On 27 October 2019, al-Baghdadi killed himself to avoid capture during a U.S. raid in northwestern Syria. By this point, the group had lost its territory in the Middle East, but continued to maintain and even expand its territories in Africa.

== Jamāʻat al-Tawḥīd wa-al-Jihād (1999–2004) ==
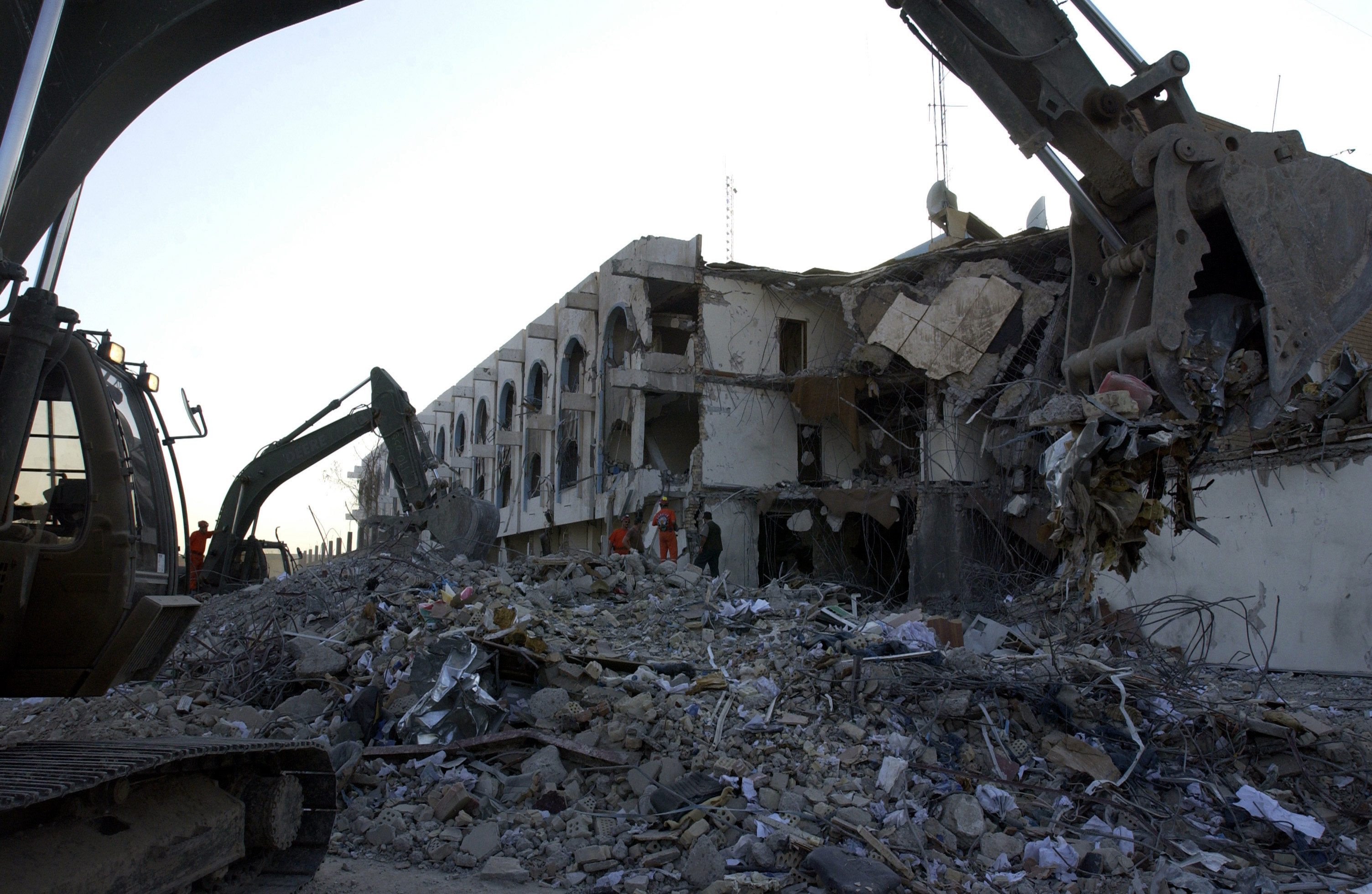
The UN headquarters building in Baghdad after the Canal Hotel bombing, on 22 August 2003

The Islamic State of Iraq and the Levant was founded in 1999 by Jordanian Salafi jihadist Abu Musab al-Zarqawi under the name Jamāʻat al-Tawḥīd wa-al-Jihād (transl. "The Organisation of Monotheism and Jihad"). In February 2004, the Coalition officials released a document that they claimed to have captured from an Iraqi "operative", detailing plans to foment a "sectarian war" in Iraq with the help of al-Qaeda's central leadership. US officials accused Zarqawi of writing the letter, although the attribution of the letter remained unverified. While Zarqawi was speculated to have been operating in Iraq during that period, he hadn't pledged allegiance to al-Qaeda leader Osama Bin Laden until October 2004.

Colonel Derek Harvey told Reuters that "the U.S. military detained Badr assassination teams possessing target lists of Sunni officers and pilots in 2003 and 2004 but didn't hold them. Harvey said his superiors told him that 'this stuff had to play itself out' – implying that revenge attacks by returning Shi'ite groups were to be expected." Jerry Burke, an adviser to the Iraqi Interior Ministry, said that in 2005 a plan from him and several colleagues to surveil and stop suspected Badr Brigade death squads in the special police forces was rejected when it got to an American Flag (General) Officer.

== Tanẓīm Qāʻidat al-Jihād fī Bilād al-Rāfidayn (2004–2006) ==
In October 2004, when al-Zarqawi swore loyalty to Osama bin Laden and al-Qaeda, he renamed the group Tanẓīm Qāʻidat al-Jihād fī Bilād al-Rāfidayn (transl. "The Organisation of Jihad's Base in Mesopotamia"), commonly known as al-Qaeda in Iraq (AQI). Although the group never called itself al-Qaeda in Iraq, this remained its informal name for many years. Attacks by the group on civilians, Iraqi government forces, foreign diplomats and soldiers, and American convoys continued with roughly the same intensity. In a letter to al-Zarqawi in July 2005, al-Qaeda's then deputy leader Ayman al-Zawahiri outlined a four-stage plan to expand the Iraq War. The plan included expelling US forces from Iraq, establishing an Islamic authority as a caliphate, spreading the conflict to Iraq's secular neighbours, and clashing with Israel, which the letter said, "[...] was established only to challenge any new Islamic entity".

In January 2006, AQI joined with several smaller Iraqi Sunni insurgent groups like "Jaish al-Ta'ifa al-Mansurah" and "Jaysh Ahl al-Sunnah wa’l-Jama’ah" under an umbrella organisation called the Mujahideen Shura Council (MSC). According to analyst Brian Fishman, the merger was an attempt to give the group a more Iraqi flavour, and perhaps to distance al-Qaeda from some of al-Zarqawi's tactical errors, such as the 2005 bombings by AQI of three hotels in Amman. On 7 June 2006, a US airstrike killed al-Zarqawi, who was succeeded as leader of the group by the Egyptian militant Abu Ayyub al-Masri.

== Islamic State of Iraq (2006–2013) ==
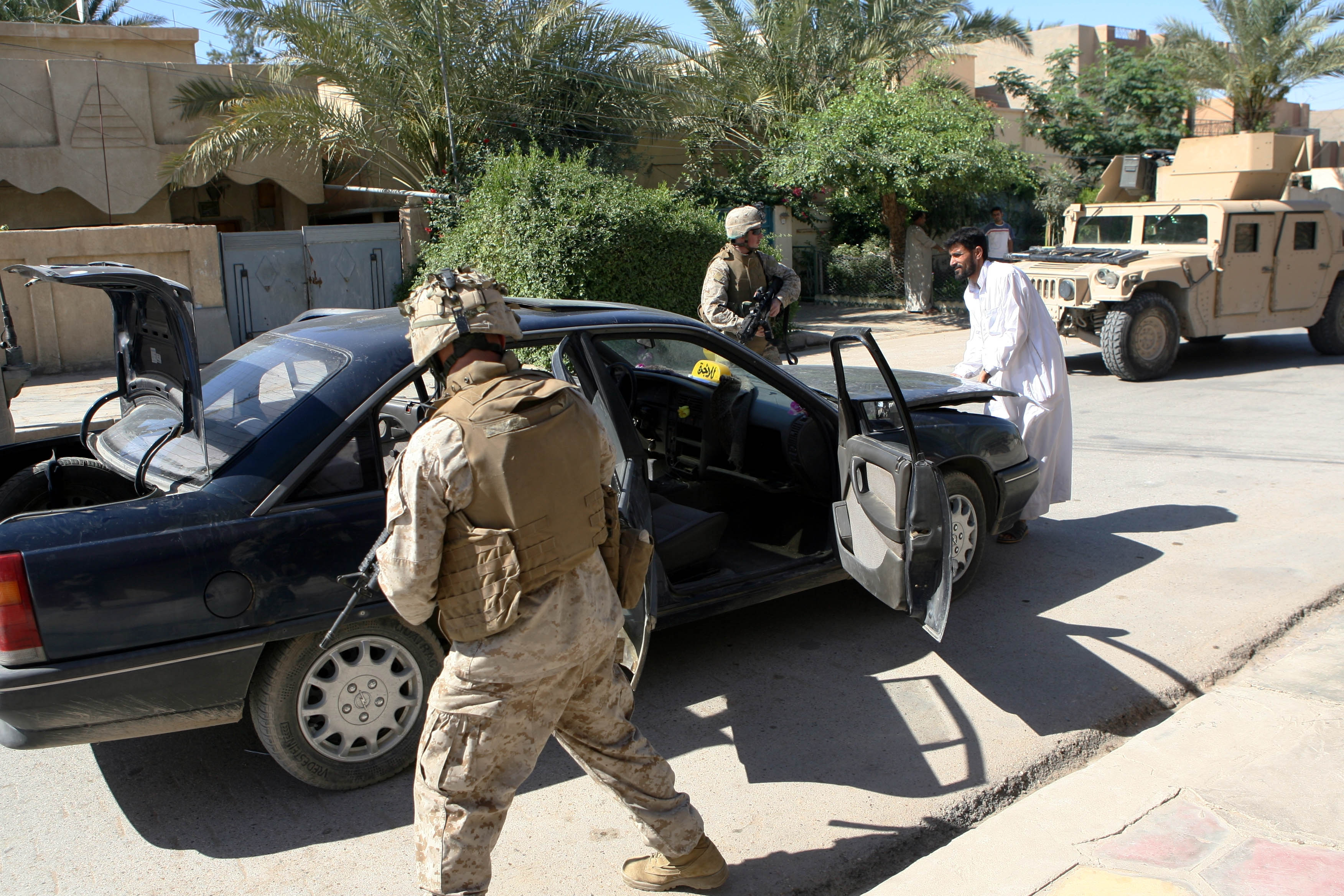
U.S. Marines in Ramadi in May 2006. The Islamic State of Iraq had declared the city to be its capital

On 12 October 2006, MSC united with three smaller groups and six Sunni tribes to form the Mutayibeen Coalition, pledging "To rid Sunnis from the oppression of the rejectionists (Shi'ite Muslims) and the crusader occupiers ... to restore rights even at the price of our own lives ... to make Allah's word supreme in the world, and to restore the glory of Islam". A day later, MSC declared the establishment of the Islamic State of Iraq (ISI), comprising Iraq's six mostly Sunni Arab governorates, with Abu Omar al-Baghdadi its emir and al-Masri Minister of War within ISI's ten-member cabinet.

According to a study compiled by United States intelligence agencies in early 2007, ISI planned to seize power in the central and western areas of Iraq and turn it into a Sunni caliphate. The group built in strength and at its height enjoyed a significant presence in the Iraqi governorates of Al Anbar, Diyala and Baghdad, claiming Baqubah as a capital city.

The Iraq War troop surge of 2007 supplied the U.S. military with more manpower for operations, and dozens of high-level ISI members being captured or killed. Between July and October 2007, Islamic State of Iraq was reported to have lost its secure military bases in Al Anbar province and the Baghdad area. During 2008, a series of US and Iraqi offensives expelled ISI-aligned insurgents from their former safe havens, such as the Diyala and Al Anbar governorates, to the area of the northern city of Mosul.

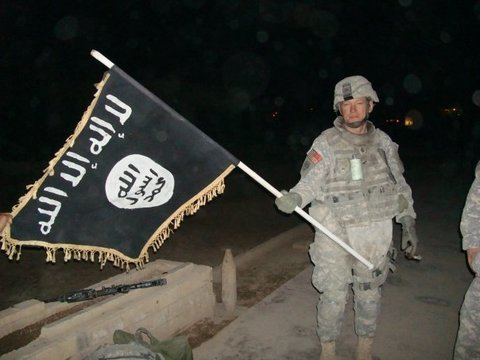
U.S. Army soldier in Iraq with captured flag from the Islamic State of Iraq, December 2010

By 2008, the ISI was describing itself as being in a state of "extraordinary crisis". Its violent attempts to govern territory led to a backlash from Sunni Arab Iraqis and other insurgent groups and a temporary decline in the group, which was attributable to a number of factors, notably the Anbar Awakening.

In late 2009, the commander of US forces in Iraq, General Ray Odierno, stated that ISI "has transformed significantly in the last two years. What once was dominated by foreign individuals has now become more and more dominated by Iraqi citizens". On 18 April 2010, ISI's two top leaders, al-Masri and Omar al-Baghdadi, were killed in a joint US-Iraqi raid near Tikrit. In a press conference in June 2010, General Odierno reported that 80% of ISI's top 42 leaders, including recruiters and financiers, had been killed or captured, with only eight remaining at large. He said that they had been cut off from al-Qaeda's leadership in Pakistan.

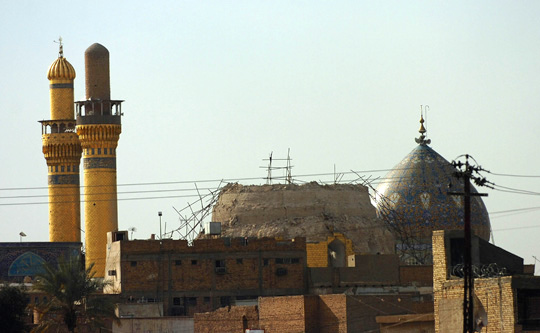
The Al-Askari Mosque, one of the holiest sites in Shia Islam, after the first attack by Islamic State of Iraq in 2006

On 16 May 2010, Abu Bakr al-Baghdadi was appointed the new leader of ISI. Al-Baghdadi replenished the group's leadership by appointing former Iraqi military and Intelligence Service officers who had served during Saddam Hussein's rule. These men, nearly all of whom had spent time imprisoned by the U.S. military at Camp Bucca, came to make up about one third of Baghdadi's top 25 commanders, including Abu Abdulrahman al-Bilawi, Ali Aswad al-Jiburi, and Abu Muslim al-Turkmani. One of them, a former colonel called Haji Bakr became the overall military commander in charge of overseeing the group's operations. Al-Khlifawi was instrumental in doing the ground work that led to the growth of ISIL.

In July 2012, al-Baghdadi released an audio statement online announcing that the group was returning to former strongholds from which US troops and the Sons of Iraq had driven them in 2007 and 2008. He declared the start of a new offensive in Iraq called Breaking the Walls, aimed at freeing members of the group held in Iraqi prisons. Violence in Iraq had begun to escalate in June 2012, primarily with ISI's car bomb attacks, and by July 2013, monthly fatalities exceeded 1,000 for the first time since April 2008.

=== Syrian Civil War ===
In March 2011, protests began in Syria against the Ba'athist government of Bashar al-Assad. In the following months, violence between demonstrators and security forces led to a gradual militarisation of the conflict. In August 2011, following the outbreak of the Syrian Civil War, al-Baghdadi began sending Syrian and Iraqi Jihadists experienced in guerilla warfare across the border into Syria to establish an organization there. On 23 January 2012, the group took up the name Jabhat an-Nuṣrah li-Ahli ash-Shām (or al-Nusra Front), operating as an autonomous entity within the transnational Al-Qaeda network and began to establish a large presence in Sunni-majority Raqqa, Idlib, Deir ez-Zor, and Aleppo provinces. Led by a Syrian known as Ahmed al-Sharaa, this group began to recruit fighters and establish cells throughout the country, with popular support among Syrians opposed to the Assad government.

== Islamic State of Iraq and the Levant (2013–14) ==
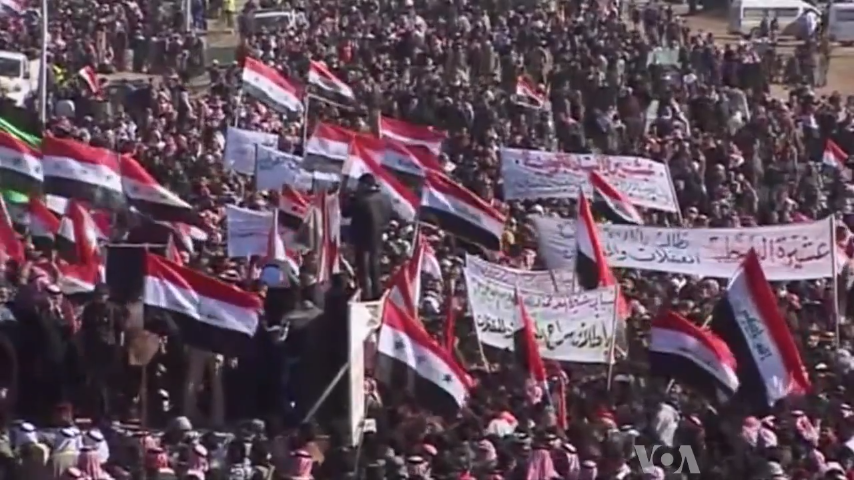
2012–2013 Iraqi protests: Iraqi Sunni demonstrators protesting against the sectarian policies Nouri al-Maliki's Shia government. The protests subsequently gave way to the Anbar revolt led by Iraqi Ba'athists. Taking advantage of the situation, ISIL militants captured Ramadi and then rapidly expanded during the 2014 Northern Iraq offensive

On 8 April 2013, al-Baghdadi released an audio statement in which he claimed that the al-Nusra Front had been established, financed, and supported by ISI, and that the two groups were merging under the name Islamic State of Iraq and al-Sham (ISIL, Al-Sham also translates as the Levant). However, Ahmed al-Sharaa and Ayman al-Zawahiri, the leaders of al-Nusra and al-Qaeda respectively, rejected the merger. Al-Julani issued a statement denying the merger, and complaining that neither he nor anyone else in al-Nusra's leadership had been consulted about it.

In June 2013, Al Jazeera reported that it had obtained a letter written by al-Qaeda's leader Ayman al-Zawahiri, addressed to both leaders, in which he ruled against the merger, and appointed an emissary to oversee relations between them to put an end to tensions. That same month, al-Baghdadi released an audio message rejecting al-Zawahiri's ruling and declaring that the merger was going ahead. Strong condemnation from Al-Nusra and AQ leaderships of the move to proceed with the merger, resulted in ISIL's formal split from the wider Jihadist movement, leading to a fierce conflict with the Al-Qaeda network. ISIL significantly revamped the course of the Syrian civil war when it announced unilateral expansion into Syria in mid-2013 and began conducting ground attacks not only against the Ba'athist Syrian military forces, but also the Free Syrian militias.

Meanwhile, the ISIL campaign to free its imprisoned members culminated in simultaneous raids on Taji and Abu Ghraib prisons in July 2013, freeing more than 500 prisoners, many of them veterans of the Iraqi insurgency. In October 2013, al-Zawahiri ordered the disbanding of ISIL, putting al-Nusra Front in charge of jihadist efforts in Syria, but al-Baghdadi rejected al-Zawahiri's order, and his group continued to operate in Syria. In February 2014, after an eight-month power struggle, al-Qaeda publicly disavowed any relations with ISIL.

According to journalist Sarah Birke, there are "significant differences" between al-Nusra Front and ISIL. While al-Nusra actively calls for the overthrow of the Assad government, ISIL "tends to be more focused on establishing its own rule on conquered territory". ISIL is "far more ruthless" in building an Islamic state, "carrying out sectarian attacks and imposing sharia law immediately". While al-Nusra has a "large contingent of foreign fighters", it is seen as a home-grown group by many Syrians; by contrast, ISIL fighters have been described as "foreign 'occupiers'" by many Syrian refugees. Foreign fighters in Syria include Russian-speaking jihadists who were part of Lisa al-Muhajireen wal-Ansar (referred to as JMA). In November 2013, Abu Omar al-Shishani, leader of the JMA, swore an oath of allegiance to al-Baghdadi; the group then split between those who followed al-Shishani in joining ISIL and those who continued to operate independently in the JMA under new leadership.

In January 2014, rebels affiliated with the Islamic Front and the US-trained Free Syrian Army launched an offensive against ISIL militants in and around the city of Aleppo, following months of tensions over ISIL's behavior, which included the seizure of property and weapons from rebel groups, and the arrests and killings of activists. Months of clashes ensued, causing thousands of casualties, with ISIL withdrawing its forces from Idlib and Latakia provinces and redeploying them to reinforce its strongholds in Raqqa and Aleppo. It also launched an offensive against all other opposition forces active in the eastern province of Deir ez-Zor, on the border with Iraq. By June 2014, ISIL had largely defeated its rivals in the province, with many who had not been killed or driven away pledging allegiance to it.

In Iraq, ISIL was able to capture most of Fallujah in January 2014, and in June 2014 was able to seize control of Mosul.

After an eight-month power struggle, al-Qaeda cut all ties with ISIL by February 2014, citing its failure to consult and "notorious intransigence".

In early 2014, ISIL drove Iraqi government forces out of key cities in its Anbar campaign, which was followed by the capture of Mosul and the Sinjar massacre. The loss of control almost caused a collapse of the Iraqi government and prompted a renewal of U.S. military action in Iraq. In Syria, ISIL has conducted ground attacks on both the Syrian Arab Army and rebel factions.

== Islamic State (2014–present) ==
On 29 June 2014, ISIL proclaimed itself to be "the Islamic State", a worldwide caliphate. Abu Bakr al-Baghdadi – known by his supporters as Amir al-Mu'minin, Caliph Ibrahim – was named its caliph, and the group renamed itself ad-Dawlah al-Islāmiyah ("Islamic State" (IS)). As a "Caliphate", it claims religious, political and military authority over all Muslims worldwide. The concept of it being a caliphate and the name "Islamic State" have been rejected by governments and Muslim leaders worldwide.

In June and July 2014, Jordan and Saudi Arabia moved at least 30,000 troops to their borders with Iraq, after the Iraqi government lost control of (or withdrew from) strategic crossing points that were captured by either ISIL or tribes that supported it. There was speculation that Iraqi Prime Minister Nouri al-Maliki had ordered a withdrawal of troops from the Iraq–Saudi crossings in order "to increase pressure on Saudi Arabia and bring the threat of ISIS over-running its borders as well".

In July 2014, IS recruited more than 6,300 fighters, according to the Syrian Observatory for Human Rights, some of whom were thought to have previously fought for the Free Syrian Army. On 23 July 2014, Abu Sayyaf leader Isnilon Hapilon and some masked men swore loyalty to al-Baghdadi in a video, giving IS a presence in the Philippines. In September 2014, the group began kidnapping people for ransom.

In 2016, according to the daily, La Stampa, officials from Europol conducted an investigation into the trafficking of fake documents for IS. They have identified fake Syrian passports in the refugee camps in Greece that were destined to supposed members of IS, in order to avoid Greek government controls and make their way to other parts of Europe. Also, the chief of Europol said that a new task force of 200 counter terrorism officers will be deployed to the Greek islands alongside Greek border guards in order to help Greece thwart a "strategic" level campaign by Islamic State to infiltrate terrorists into Europe.

In early May 2019, after almost five years since his last public appearance in the summer of 2014, al-Baghdadi appeared in a video declaring his organisation's new geographical ambitions. After the loss of the territories it once occupied in the Levant and the crumbling of the 'Caliphate' project, the leader of the group boasted in his speech of "new oaths of allegiance extended to him from jihadis in Mali, Burkina Faso, Afghanistan, and Sri Lanka" as well as in Turkey. According to Syrian-American journalist Hassan Hassan, in a comment in Foreign Policy magazine, "Baghdadi's video marks the failure of the U.S.-led coalition to capture Baghdadi and dismantle his organization. It demonstrates the health of both Baghdadi and his organization—refuting recent rumors that he was ailing—and allows them to boast about a major terrorist attack, their expansion to new places, and the recruitment of new members."

=== Capture of territory ===
Maximum extent of IS territorial control in Syria and Iraq in 2015.

On 3 August 2014, IS captured the cities of Zumar, Sinjar and Wana in northern Iraq. Thousands of Yazidis fled up Mount Sinjar, fearful of the approaching hostile IS militants. The stranded Yazidis' need for food and water, the threat of genocide to them and to others announced by IS, along with the desire to protect US citizens in Iraq and support the Iraqi government in its fight against IS, were all reasons given for the 2014 American intervention in Iraq, which began on 7 August. A US aerial bombing campaign began the following day.

At the end of October 2014, 800 militants gained partial control of the Libyan city of Derna and pledged their allegiance to Abu Bakr al-Baghdadi, thus making Derna the first city outside Syria and Iraq to be a part of the "Islamic State Caliphate". On 10 November 2014, a major faction of the Egyptian militant group Ansar Bait al-Maqdis also pledged its allegiance to IS. In mid-January 2015, a Yemeni official said that IS had "dozens" of members in Yemen, and that they were coming into direct competition with al-Qaeda in the Arabian Peninsula because of their recruitment drive. The same month, Afghan officials confirmed that IS had a military presence in Afghanistan. However, by February 2015, 65 of the militants were either captured or killed by the Taliban, and IS's top Afghan recruiter, Mullah Abdul Rauf, was killed in a U.S. drone strike.

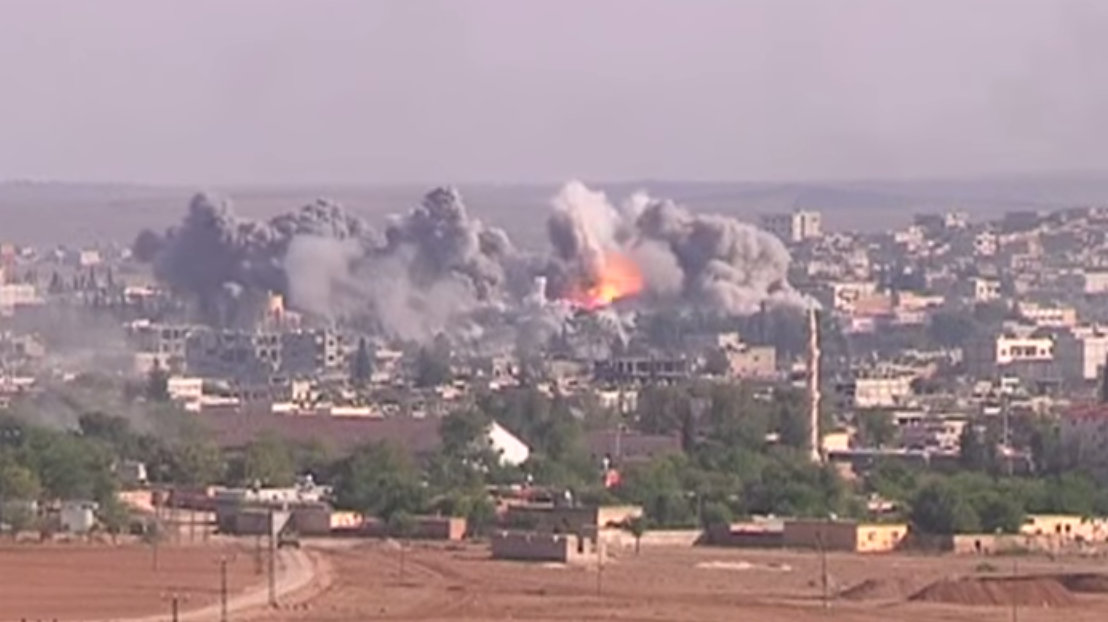
Coalition airstrike on an Islamic State position in Kobani, Syria, October 2014

In early February 2015, IS militants in Libya managed to capture part of the countryside to the west of Sabha, and later, an area encompassing the cities of Sirte, Nofolia, and a military base to the south of both cities. By March, IS had captured additional territory, including a city to the west of Derna, additional areas near Sirte, a stretch of land in southern Libya, some areas around Benghazi, and an area to the east of Tripoli.

On 7 March 2015, Boko Haram swore formal allegiance to IS, giving IS an official presence in Nigeria, Niger, Chad and Cameroon. On 13 March 2015, a group of militants from the Islamic Movement of Uzbekistan swore allegiance to IS; the group released another video on 31 July 2015 showing its spiritual leader also pledging allegiance. In June 2015, the US Deputy Secretary of State announced that IS had lost more than 10,000 members in airstrikes over the preceding nine months.

=== Loss of territory and declarations of victory by opponents ===
Since 2015, IS has lost territory in Iraq and Syria, including Tikrit in March and April 2015, Baiji in October, Sinjar in November 2015, Ramadi in December 2015, Fallujah in June 2016 and Palmyra in March 2017.

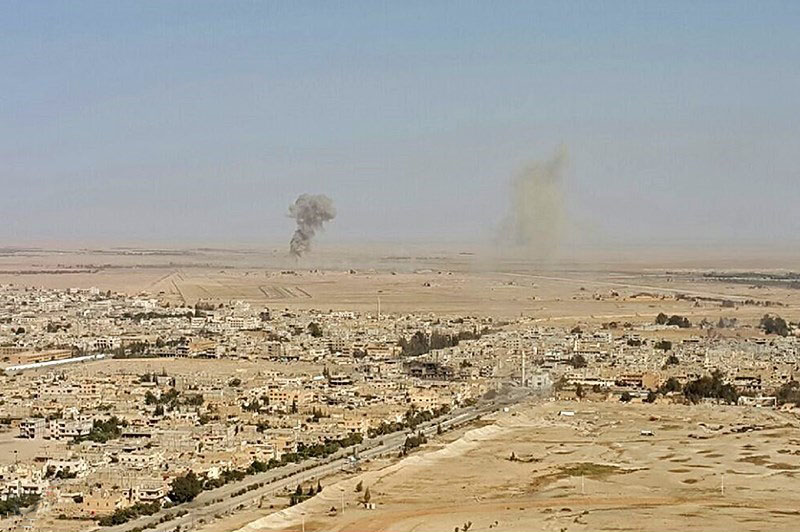
Liberation of Palmyra by the Russia–Syria–Iran–Iraq coalition in March 2016

Since the fall of IS in Mosul, the overall extent of IS held territory in both Syria and Iraq has significantly diminished. On 17 October 2017, IS lost control of Raqqa in the second battle of Raqqa. On 3 November, Deir ez-Zor, IS's last major city in Syria, was recaptured, and Rawa, the last town held by IS in Iraq, was captured on 17 November.

On 21 November 2017, Iranian president Hassan Rouhani declared victory over IS. Qasem Soleimani, senior military officer of the Guardians of the Islamic Revolution, wrote to Iran's supreme leader Ali Khamenei that IS had been defeated. Vladimir Putin, President of Russia, declared victory over IS in Syria as well. Iraqi prime minister Haider al-Abadi also announced the military defeat of IS in Iraq. Iraq detained more than 19,000 people suspected of links to IS and other terrorist groups, and sentenced at least 3,000 of them to death.

On 23 November 2018, Britain's Chief of the General Staff General Mark Carleton-Smith said that the "physical manifestation of the Islamist threat has diminished with the complete destruction of the geography of the so-called Caliphate."

On 19 December 2018, US president Donald Trump declared IS to have been defeated. The UK's junior Defence Minister Tobias Ellwood said he "strongly" disagreed with Trump that IS had been defeated. German foreign minister Heiko Maas said that "IS has been pushed back but the threat is not yet over. There is a danger that the consequences of Trump's Syria withdrawal will damage the fight against IS and jeopardise the successes already achieved." The US-backed Syrian Democratic Forces declared military victory over IS on 23 March 2019 following the Battle of Baghuz Fawqani, although the group maintains a scattered presence and sleeper cells across Syria and Iraq.

=== Shift to insurgency ===
Beginning primarily in 2017, as the Islamic State lost more swathes of territory and lost control over major settlements and cities, the group increasingly resorted to more terror bombings and insurgency operations, using its scattered underground networks of sleeper cells across regions in the Middle East and various offshoots and adherents. The collapse of its final Middle Eastern territories in 2019 after the Battle of Baghuz Fawqani propelled the group into full insurgency phase in the regions it once controlled, while retaining influence via propaganda efforts and in remote hideouts, such as in the Syrian Desert.

In July 2019, United Nations analysts on the Security Council Counter-Terrorism Committee warned al-Baghdadi was plotting a comeback from Iraq. He could launch international terrorist attacks before the end of the year in European nations. By 7 October 2019, it was thought that IS could re-emerge with the withdrawal of American troops from the region.

On 27 October 2019, al-Baghdadi was targeted by U.S. military and died after he detonated a suicide vest in Barisha, Idlib, Northwest Syria. President Donald Trump confirmed in a televised announcement from the White House later that day that al-Baghdadi had died during a raid by US special forces in Idlib.

In September 2019, a statement attributed to IS's propaganda arm, the Amaq News Agency, claimed that Abdul Nasser Qardash was named as al-Baghdadi's successor. Analysts dismissed this statement as a fabrication, and relatives were reported as saying that Qardash died in 2017. Rita Katz, a terrorism analyst and the co-founder of SITE Intelligence, noted that the alleged statement used a different font when compared to other statements and it was never distributed on Amaq or IS channels.

On 29 October 2019, President Trump stated on social media that al-Baghdadi's "number one replacement" had been killed by American forces, adding: "Most likely would have taken the top spot - Now he is also Dead!" While President Trump didn't specify a name, a U.S. official later confirmed that Trump was referring to IS spokesman and senior leader Abul-Hasan al-Muhajir, who was killed in a U.S. airstrike in Syria two days earlier. Less than a week after the death of Abu Bakr al-Baghdadi on 31 October, IS named Abu Ibrahim al-Hashimi al-Qurashi as Baghdadi's successor, indicating that the group still considers itself a caliphate despite having lost all of its territory in Iraq and Syria. Two other individuals close to Baghdadi and believed to have been present in his last video appearance, the Saudi Abu Saleh al-Juzrawi and the Tunisian Abu Othman al-Tunsi, were also named as possible candidates to succeed Abu Bakr al-Baghdadi. In April 2021 Russian forces killed dozens of Islamic State militants in a series of air strikes following the Islamic State's killing of two Russian pilots.

In January 2022, IS was described as resurging, being able to mount "coordinated and sophisticated attacks" from "sleeper cells in remote mountain and desert areas". During the 10-day-long Battle of al-Hasakah, they won a "partial strategic victory and major propaganda victory" with "hundreds of prisoners, including important Emirs, being freed" from the makeshift prison in the city of Hasaka. In the fighting 346 IS fighters were killed, and the anti-IS Syrian Democratic Forces arrested 1,100 prisoners, but a total of 400 prisoners were found to be missing. IS also killed 10 soldiers and an officer storming an army outpost in Diyala Province, attacking the base from three sides late at night.

On 3 February 2022, al-Qurashi killed himself, and members of his family, by triggering a large bomb during a raid by the U.S. Joint Special Operations Command. He was succeeded by Abu al-Hasan al-Hashimi al-Qurashi, who held this position until being killed in Syria on 15 October 2022. His successor, Abu al-Hussein al-Husseini al-Qurashi, was the first Syrian to serve as a caliph, and was killed in Syria on 29 April 2023. His successor and current caliph is Abu Hafs al-Hashimi al-Qurashi.

As of June 2023, the U.S. Department of State found "worrisome signs" that IS's "core leadership is strengthening control over its global network of affiliates," and that its affiliates are "pooling resources" and "growing capabilities", despite a "series of key losses".

In 2024, at least 10,000 IS fighters were still active in Syria, according to estimates by the Kurdish-led SDF. As of 2025, approximately 10,000 suspected IS fighters and their supporters were being held in Syrian detention centers, with tens of thousands of their wives and children living in secure camps. Some former IS members were released from prison during an amnesty in Iraq in 2025.

== Terrorist attacks outside Iraq and Syria ==
IS has claimed responsibility for a number of high-profile terrorist attacks outside Iraq and Syria, including a mass shooting at a Tunisian tourist resort (38 European tourists killed), the Suruç bombing in Turkey (33 leftist and pro-Kurdish activists killed), the Tunisian National Museum attack (24 foreign tourists and Tunisians killed), the Sana'a mosque bombings (142 Shia civilians killed), the crash of Metrojet Flight 9268 (224 killed, mostly Russian tourists), the bombings in Ankara (102 pro-Kurdish and leftist activists killed), the bombings in Beirut (43 Shia civilians killed), the November 2015 Paris attacks (130 civilians killed), the killing of Jaafar Mohammed Saad, the governor of Aden, the January 2016 Istanbul bombing (11 foreign tourists killed), the 2016 Brussels bombings (32 civilians killed), the 2016 Atatürk Airport attack (48 foreign and Turkish civilians killed), the 2016 Nice truck attack (86 civilians killed), the July 2016 Kabul bombing (at least 80 civilians killed, mostly Shia Hazaras), the 2016 Berlin truck attack (12 civilians killed), the 2017 Istanbul nightclub shooting (39 foreigners and Turks killed), the 2017 Saint Petersburg Metro bombing (15 civilians killed), the 2017 Manchester Arena bombing (22 civilians killed), the 2017 Barcelona attacks (16 civilians killed), the 2017 Tehran attacks (18 civilians killed), the 2018 Pakistan bombings (154 killed), the 2021 Kabul airport attack (183 killed, including the perpetrator), and the 2024 Crocus City Hall attack (130+ killed).

The Saudi Arabian government reports that in one relatively short period—the first eight months of 2016—there were 25 attacks in the kingdom by IS.

== Mass graves ==
On 30 August 2016, a survey conducted by the Associated Press found that around 72 mass graves have been discovered in areas that have been liberated from IS control. In total, these mass graves contain the bodies of approximately 15,000 people killed by IS. The report stated that the mass graves were evidence of genocides conducted by IS in the region, including the genocide of Yazidis. Seventeen graves were discovered in Syria, with the rest being found in Iraq. At least 16 of the graves in Iraq contained remains that were not counted, as they are located in dangerous conflict zones. Instead, the number of dead in these graves has been estimated.

On 6 November 2018, a United Nations report revealed over 200 mass graves of thousands of IS's victims were discovered. The grave sites, which may contain up to 12,000 bodies, were found in the northern and western Iraqi provinces of Nineveh, Kirkuk, Salah al-Din and Anbar.

== See also ==
- List of terrorist incidents linked to the Islamic State
- List of wars and battles involving the Islamic State
- Timeline of the Islamic State: 2013, 2014, 2015, 2016, 2017, 2018, 2019, 2020, 2021, 2022, 2023, 2024, 2025, 2026
