= Names of the Islamic State =

IS flag

The name of the Islamic State has been contentious since 2013. In Arabic, the group called itself al-Dawla al-ʾIslāmiyya fī al-ʿIrāq wa al-Shām, which it adopted in April 2013. The literal translation of its previous name resulted in confusion, resulting in both ISIS and ISIL, two acronyms based on different literal translations of the name into English. The acronym for their Arabic name is "Daesh" (Arabic: داعش, romanized: Dāʿish, lit. 'ISIS'), which is the common name for the group used by their opponents in the Muslim world. Transliterations of the Arabic acronym are also used in other languages including English and Israeli Hebrew (Hebrew: דאעש). The group's current name caused controversy due to its English translation as Islamic State and as a result, both the previous acronyms are still widely used, or a qualifier is often added to the IS name, such as "Islamic State militant group", "Islamic State extremist group", "Islamic State terrorist group," "self-styled Islamic State" or "so-called Islamic State."

== Background ==
Originating in Iraq, the group underwent various previous name changes, and since 2006 had been known as Islamic State of Iraq (ISI), a name which had failed to gain any traction, as the group had failed to gain or hold any significant territory as ISI, and thus widespread confusion over what to call them was largely absent. Confusion began when the group gained further territory and changed its name to ad-Dawlah al-Islāmiyah fī 'l-ʿIrāq wa-sh-Shām in April 2013 as it expanded into Syria. It then changed to ad-Dawlah al-Islāmiyah in June 2014 as part of a desire to re-establish a caliphate. The rendering of the Arabic name in English varies, due to imprecise translation.

In the Arab world and beyond, the group is referred to by its Arabic-language acronym "Daesh" (alt. Da'esh | Arabic: داعش | pronunc. dah-ESH). The acronym is derived from the group's extended name: "D" / daal(د) = ad-Dawla, "the state [of]", "A" / alif(ا) = al-Islamiyya, "Islam", "E" / 'ayn(ع) = fi'l- 'iraq, "in Iraq", "Sh" / shin(ش) = wa'ash-Sham, "and the Sham (region roughly equivalent to the Levant)".

"Daesh" is a transcription of the pronunciation of the group's acronym in Arabic. Unfortunately, it is not an English-language acronym in its own right, due to discrepancies between English/Arabic alphabets and phonologies. Specifically, the Arabic letter shin ش has no letter equivalent in English, though it can be easily represented by the digraph "sh". Alif ا is usually equated to the letter A, but in fact can represent several different vowel sounds as well as a glottal stop, depending on the context (Daesh vs. al-Islam). Additionally, the pronunciation of the letter 'ayn ع is also variable, and has no equivalent letter or vocalization in English.

== Translation of the name's components ==
=== Literal translation of ash-Shām ===
The parallel use of both ISIS and ISIL as acronym originated from uncertainty in how to translate the Arabic word "ash-Shām" (or "al-Sham") in the group's April 2013 name, which can be translated variously as "the Levant", "Greater Syria", "Syria" or even "Damascus". This led to the widely used translations of "Islamic State in Iraq and the Levant", "Islamic State in Iraq and Syria" or "Islamic State in Iraq and al-Sham". "The Levant" generally refers to at least part or all of Syria, Iraq, Jordan, Israel, Palestine, and Lebanon, though its definition varies.

According to the BBC, since neither "Levant", nor "Syria", reflect the group's likely meaning of the word al-Sham in Arabic, "various experts have therefore said that the word al-Sham should not be translated" (when rendering the long form name). According to Syrian-American journalist Hassan Hassan, if the term Levant had been the intended meaning, the Arabic word would have been "Bilad al-Sham", whereas the more likely meaning of Greater Syria still leads to the acronym ISIS.

=== Literal translation of ad-Dawlah ===
In contrast to the difficulties in translation of the group's former name, according to The Guardian the group's 2014 name "near enough" literally translates to "Islamic State", however there is still a remaining difficulty since this fails to capture the true Arabic connotations, which are closer to a religious concept of a united Islamic community (ummah) under Sharia law, as opposed to western concept of a bureaucratic state apparatus.

== Other names ==
Reflecting the desire to build a caliphate, the group also refers to itself as "al-Dawlah", meaning simply "the State". and by "Dawlatul Islam" meaning "state of Islam". Syrians living under the group's control referred to them as "al-tanẓīm", Arabic for "the organization". Reflecting the group's origins as a renegade splinter group, supporters of Al-Qā`idah referred to the group simply as "al-Baġdādī's group".

=== Daesh and variants ===
The name Daesh, considered pejorative by the Islamic State, is the common term for the group used in the Muslim world. It is based on the Arabic letters Dāl, 'alif, `ayn, and shīn, which together form the acronym داعش (Dāʿish) of ISIL's 2013 name al-Dawla al-ʾIslāmiyya fī al-`Irāq wa al-Shām. It is pronounced with the emphasis on a long "e", which lends itself to being said in a snarling or aggressive tone for English speakers listening to Arabic speech. The acronym was supposedly first used by supporters of Syrian president Bashar al-Assad. Daesh is used by mainstream Muslims, who believe it better separates the group from their faith.

While "Daesh" has no other meaning in Arabic, it is very similar to the Arabic word دعس (Dāʿis), meaning "one who crushes (or tramples down) something underfoot". It also resembles the Arabic word داحس (Dāhis), the beginning of داحس والغبراء (Dāhis wa'l-Ghabrā', or "felon and dust"), which refers to the Islamic concept of the Jahiliyyah and can be loosely translated as "one who sows discord". Both words obviously have a negative connotation in Arabic culture, undermining the group's claim to have revived the Caliphate, leading to the group objecting to it as a pejorative name. Another reason for objection is the rarity of acronyms in Arabic, particularly those which have no meaning. "The United Nations" for example is always translated directly in Arabic, with no "UN" acronym equivalent. "Fatah" and "Hamas" are acronyms but they are also Arabic words in their own right (meaning "conquest" and "zeal" respectively). "Daesh" however is not only an acronym but also phonetically meaningless in Arabic, reducing the legitimacy of the name and by extension the group to which it belongs.

However, according to the British ambassador to Iraq speaking in January 2015, Daesh has since become an Arabic word in its own right, with a plural – dawāʿish (دواعش) – meaning "bigots who impose their views on others". By the end of the year, the plural term was in widespread use in the Middle East.

According to Associated Press reporting the words of residents of Mosul in Iraq who were speaking on condition of anonymity, the group itself wishes to be referred to by its full name only, Islamic State, considering the acronym Daesh to be disrespectful, going so far as to threaten to cut the tongue out of anyone who used it in public. According to The Week, experts argue that it is a key aim of the group to secure sole use of names which imply statehood and an Islamic faith, for purposes of propaganda. According to the American commander of the US mission in Iraq and Syria, Lt Gen James L. Terry, the Arab coalition partners believed strongly that the US should avoid referring to the enemy as ISIL and instead use Daesh, to avoid giving legitimacy to the group's aims.

Although these names were being widely used in the Arab world, Western media outlets were initially slow to adopt them, instead in favour of ISIS/ISIL. This has subsequently changed after the group's name change to IS, with media and politicians now using it widely, with the BBC speculating this was either "despite or perhaps as a direct consequence of the irritation it causes the group". Karin Ryding, emerita professor of Arab linguistics at Georgetown University, suggested Daesh is sub-optimal, since many English speakers are unable to pronounce it the same way Arabic speakers do, due to the voiced pharyngeal fricative, represented by the apostrophe in Dai'ish.

=== Self-Styled Islamic State ===
The term Self-Styled Islamic State (SSIS) has also been used many times to refer to the group. Many newspapers, such as The Age use a variant expression "so-called Islamic State".

== Common usage ==
=== Usage of ISIS, ISIL vs. Islamic State ===
Most English language outlets initially first used ISIS, while usage of ISIL later increased. Use of ISIS was particularly more prevalent than ISIL in British media. It has been argued that ISIS has been retained simply because it rolls off the tongue of English speakers, who are familiar with it through its other meaning as the name of an Egyptian goddess.

The group's adoption of the name Islamic State led to controversy due to the inference that it represented the Islamic faith or was a sovereign state, leading to outlets choosing to retain the acronyms ISIS or ISIL, or using qualifiers on the new name. Despite the objections, use of the group's preferred name of Islamic State without qualification also spread.

=== Government and organisations ===
The United Nations generally refers to the group as ISIL. Former U.N. Secretary-General Ban Ki-moon has also used "Un-Islamic Non-State".

Governments of the Arab states adopted Daesh and continue to use it instead of IS. The Israeli government approach has been the same as Arab states.

The British government originally used ISIL, but adopted Daesh on 2 December 2015.

The French government elected to use a French-based spelling ('Daech') of the Arabic name, replacing its previous French name, EIIL (L'Etat islamique en Irak et au Levant), stating that other names "blur the lines between Islam, Muslims and Islamists".

The Australian government, under Prime Minister Tony Abbott, adopted Daesh in January 2015.

The United States government designated Islamic State of Iraq and the Levant (ISIL) as the group's primary name, believing "Levant" to be the more accurate translation. It also listed the Islamic State of Iraq and al-Sham (ISIS), the Islamic State of Iraq and Syria (ISIS), ad-Dawla al-Islamiyya fi al-'Iraq wa-sh-Sham, Daesh, Dawla al Islamiya, and Al-Furqan Establishment for Media Production, as aliases. This was to disassociate the group from the al-Nusrah Front (ANF), as a result of the rift between the two groups. Usage has not been consistent however, with ISIS, ISIL, Islamic State and Daesh all being used variously, both domestically and overseas, with the precise term chosen based on the audience, recognising the need for consistency and that the American public was more familiar with ISIL, while also catering to partners who are more attached to Daesh. President Barack Obama used ISIL. In February 2017, the Pentagon adopted the abbreviation ISIS when referencing the group.

A spokesman for the Canadian Minister of Foreign Affairs told Power & Politics in December 2014, "Whether it is called Daesh, ISIL or ISIS, Canada and the coalition agree this heinous terrorist group presents a threat to the region, and the entire world. That is why Canada has announced a number of measures designed to combat ISIL's brutality and help victims of this barbaric terrorist group."

In official communications, the Malaysian government often refers the group as IS, and sometimes as Daesh.

=== Media style guides ===
The Associated Press originally opted to use ISIL, believing Levant to be the most accurate translation. After the name change to IS, it has switched to referring to the "Islamic State group". The AP's guide is used by many media organisations.

BBC News chose to refer to it as "Islamic State group", "so-called islamic State", or "self-styled Islamic State" in the first instance, shortening it to IS on subsequent mentions. In face of criticism from politicians, it stood by the decision, arguing Daesh was pejorative and that its approach was necessary to maintain impartiality.

NPR uses "Islamic State" with the optional use of qualifiers in the first instance, then ISIS thereafter.

USA Today "identifies the group as the Islamic State, the Islamic State militant group, or the Islamic State extremist group."

The New York Times uses "Islamic State", choosing to explain it in context.

The Guardian, and its sister paper The Observer, uses "Islamic State" at first mention and "ISIS" thereafter. (It does not uppercase acronyms). It chose "ISIS" over "ISIL" as being more usual in British media. In September 2014 it was considering switching to "IS", but by April 2016 had not done so, but instead used ISIS. Following the name change, it moved to "Islamic State (ISIS)" at first mention, and thereafter IS.

Iran's news outlets such as state-owned Press TV use the name "Daesh Takfiri" (see Iran and ISIL).

Financial Times chose to stick with ISIS even after the group's name change.

Several newspapers published by Metro International such as the Toronto edition sourced from the Toronto Star uses "Daesh".

Malaysian newspapers, such as Harian Metro, Kosmo!, and New Straits Times, refer the group as "IS" and sometimes as "Daesh".

== Reaction ==
Some media commentators have suggested that the debate over what to call the group was of little importance when compared to the need to actually stop them.

William McCants argues attempts to avoid Islamic State denies the basic reality that they have managed to establish a state.

Writing for The Washington Post, Amanda Bennett cast the debate as less about the meaning of words, but what they convey, contrasting politician's wish to have the group seen in a negative light, with the tradition in journalistic and academic circles to use organisations own preferred names, with explanation if there is a confusion or conflict with other meanings.

Writing in The Independent, assistant secretary general of the Muslim Council of Britain, Miqdaad Versi, argued that "Daesh" is preferable to allowing the group to be able to use its preferred name, pointing out there were various inconsistencies in the BBC's and other outlets choice not to translate the names of other groups, and pointing out that Boko Haram is also an unofficial pejorative name.

Concerning the issue of using recognisable names, Stephen Pritchard of The Guardian relayed the failure of their paper to get it right when they initially used "The Brotherhood", the rough English translation to refer to the little known Al-Qaeda group in the wake of the September 11 attacks, before quickly dropping it as the Arabic name gained traction, despite it being their chosen brand.

== See also ==
- Name changes due to the Islamic State
