= Jaysh al-Fatiheen =

Islamic militant organitation in Iraq

- جيش الفاتحين
- Other name: Al-Fatihin Army
- Leader: Abdul Rahman Al-Qaisi †
- Dates active: 2003 (as part of the Islamic Army in Iraq); January 2006 (as an independent militia) – ?
- Split from: Islamic Army in Iraq
- Merged into: Mujahideen Shura Council in Iraq
- Country: Iraq
- Groups: Saad bin Abi Waqqas Battalion; Al-Nasser Salah al-Din Battalion; Abu Ayoub Al-Ansari Battalion; Lions of the Merciful; Unknown Fifth Battalion
- Ideology: Jihadism; Salafi jihadism
- Part of: Jihad and Reform Front (until 2008); Jihad and Change Front
- Wars: Iraq War; Iraqi insurgency; 2003–2006 phase; Iraqi civil war (2006–2008); Final phase

The Jaysh al-Fatiheen (Arabic: جيش الفاتحين, lit. 'Army of the Conquerors') (Note: also called Jaish al-Fatihin) is an Islamist militant organization based in Iraq.

== History ==
=== Foundation ===
Jaysh al-Fatiheen's first appearance was on January 2006, when the group broke away from Islamic Army in Iraq, since then, the group has become one of the most active and prolific insurgent groups in Iraq. Although Abdul Rahman Al-Qaisi claims that the group and the Islamic Army in Iraq were brought together by a single official spokesperson due to certain circumstances and a specific stage.

=== Activities ===
After joining the Mujahideen Shura Council, the group's media wing stated that "Perhaps it happened unintentionally, but we were not informed [of the formation of this alliance], either directly or indirectly".

The group alleges that the Ba'athists use lies and propaganda to cover up their failures, Jaysh al-Fatiheen claim that these false statements only aid cross-intelligence and the campaign of distortion, the group left the Jihad and Reform Front to join the Jihad and Change Front. Although almost all the battalions had joined the Mujahideen Shura Council, the Unknown Fifth Battalion did not join.

In 2006, Jaysh al-Fatiheen declared that their leader Abu Abdul Rahman had been "martyred" in Ramadi, with the following message: "We bring good news to the nation of Islam and announce the martyrdom of a lion among the lions of jihad, Abu Abdul Rahman, emir of the Jaysh al-Fatiheen in Ramadi".

=== Dissolution ===
Jaysh al-Fatiheen's staff were integrated into the Islamic State along with various insurgent groups, primarily Sunni communities, including the Mujahideen Shura Council and Al-Qaeda, Jund al-Sahaba, Katbiyan Ansar al-Tawhid wal Sunnah and Jaish al-Ta'ifa al-Mansurah, from which ISIS receives support.

== Battalions ==
- Saad bin Abi Waqqas Battalion
- Al-Nasser Salah al-Din Battalion
- Abu Ayoub Al-Ansari Battalion
- Lions of the Merciful
- Unknown Fifth Battalion
