= Salafi Army of Abu Bakr Al-Siddiq =

Iraqi Sunni Islam organization

Abu Bakr Al-Salafi Army
- جيش أبي بكر الصديق السلفي
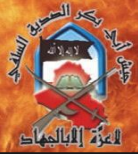
- Dates active: 2003 - 2017
- Country: Iraq
- Ideology: Salafism, nationalism

The Salafi Army of Abu Bakr al-Siddiq is an Iraqi organization affiliated with Sunni Islam is Mostly known to have arrest and captured about 564 members of the police and iraqi army, and released some of them after interrogation and others are still in its custody. They published nearly 100 films about its operation and is active in Al Anbar, Baghdad and Diyala.

== Joining the Islamic State ==
The Salafi Army of Abu Bakr joined the Islamic State of Iraq after the killing of the Emir of the Islamic State of Iraq Abu Omar al-Baghdadi and Minister of War Abu Hamza al-Muhajir.

== Denial of joining the Islamic State ==
After that, a statement was issued by the Media Authority of the Army of Abu Bakr Al-Siddiq in which it denied what was published by the Islamic State of Iraq regarding the joining of the army under the banner of the state due to their differences in legitimate political matters, and that those who agreed to join were 9 of their leaders, while 10 others refused. This 9 known About them flattery and hypocrisy, and that they would change their words and their positions whenever they met any group.

== Activity ==
The group's activity disappeared after the end of the second Iraqi civil war, and they have not claimed any attack since then.
