= Wakefulness and Holy War =

Wakefulness and Holy War was a name claimed by an Arab Sunni Muslim group that launched attacks on American and allied forces in and around Fallujah in 2003. They videotaped one of their attacks on American forces and sent it to an Iranian television on July 7, 2003. On the tape they said "Saddam and America are two sides of the same coin."
