= Khaled al-Mashhadani =

Member of al-Qaeda

Khaled al-Mashhadani (full name Khaled Abdul-Fattah Dawoud Mahmoud al-Mashhadani, also known as Abu Shahed) was a senior operative of al-Qaeda in Iraq. He served as a liaison between al-Qaeda leadership in hiding in Pakistan and Abu Ayyub al-Masri until his capture on July 4, 2007, in Mosul.
