= Timeline of the Islamic State (2013) =

In 2013, the jihadist group Islamic State of Iraq and the Levant (ISIL or ISIS) adopted its name and expanded its territorial control in Syria. It began to do so in Iraq also, and committed acts of terrorism in both countries and in Turkey.

== Timeline ==
- On 8 April 2013, having expanded into Syria, the group Islamic State of Iraq (ISI) adopts the name Islamic State of Iraq and the Levant, also known as the Islamic State of Iraq and al-Sham.
- Starting in April 2013, ISIL makes rapid military gains in northern Syria, where according to the Syrian Observatory for Human Rights, it was "the strongest group".
- 11 May: Two car bombs explode in the town of Reyhanlı in Hatay Province, Turkey. At least 51 are killed and 140 injured. The attack is the deadliest single act of terrorism ever to take place on Turkish soil to date. Along with the Syrian intelligence service, ISIL is suspected of carrying out the attack.
- On 5 July, units of the 33rd Infantry Division were deployed to the town of al-Dana after ISIL fighters reportedly opened fire on anti-ISIL protesters. Clashes broke out between the two groups, and resulted in ISIL beheading a commander of the 33rd Division, and taking full control of the town.
- On 9 July, the Free Syrian Army's battalion chief Kamal Hamami—better known by his nom de guerre Abu Bassir al-Jeblawi—was killed by ISIL's Coast region emir in Latakia's rural northern highlands. Al-Jeblawi was travelling to visit the al-Izz Bin Abdulsalam Brigade operating in the region when ISIL members refused his passage.
- On 22 July, ISIL organizes a mass break-out of its members being held in Iraq's prison in Taji and Abu Ghraib prison, freeing more than 500 prisoners, many of them veterans of the Iraqi insurgency (2003–11) or senior commanders of ISIL. ISIL described the operation as involving 12 car bombs, numerous suicide bombers and mortar and rocket fire. It was described as the culmination of a one-year campaign which was launched by ISIL leader Abu Bakr al-Baghdadi.
- In early August the Menagh Air Base was captured by forces including ISIL, whose suicide bomber detonated car bomb at the airbase.
- In September, members of ISIL killed the Ahrar ash-Sham commander Abu Obeida al-Binnishi, after he had intervened to protect a Malaysian Islamic charity; ISIL had mistaken its Malaysian flag for that of the United States.
- Also in September, ISIL overran the town of Azaz, taking it from the FSA-affiliated Northern Storm Brigade. ISIL had attempted to kidnap a German doctor working in Azaz. In November 2013, Today's Zaman, a newspaper in Turkey, reported that Turkish authorities had detailed information on ISIL's plans to carry out suicide bombings in Turkey.
- From 30 September, several Turkish media websites reported that ISIL had accepted responsibility for the 11 May attack and had threatened further attacks on Turkey.
- In November, Hasan Jazra, the commander of Jabhat Ghuraba al-Sham, was publicly executed by members of ISIL in the town of Atarib. Islamist groups had accused Ghuraba of looting and collaborating at times with the Syrian government.
- In December, there were reports of fighting between ISIL and the Salafist rebel group, Ahrar ash-Sham, in the town of Maskanah, Aleppo.
- In December, ISIL began an offensive in the Anbar province in Iraq, changing the insurgency there into a regional war.
