= Iraqi University =

Public university in Baghdad, Iraq

Coordinates: 33°21′58.32″N 44°21′34.20″E

- الجامعـــة العراقيـــة
- Former names: Islamic University
- Type: Public university
- Established: 1989
- Chancellor: Ziad al-Ani, Mahmoud Rasheed
- Location: Adhamiyah, Baghdad, Iraq
- Website: www.aliraqia.edu.iq

The Iraqi University (Al Iraqia University) offers bachelor's and graduate university degrees. It is located in the Adhamiyah district of Baghdad, Iraq. It was founded in 1989 and was formerly named the Islamic University. In 2010, the university council recommended that the name be changed to Iraqi University.

The university accepts students from all over the Islamic world. It offers degrees in sciences, humanities, applied medicine, engineering, media and arts, law, education, and other subjects.

== Faculties and colleges ==
- Arts Faculty
- College of Education
- College of Women's Education
- Engineering Faculty
- Information Faculty
- Islamic Sciences Faculty
- College of Law
- Management and Economics Faculty
- Medical Faculty

== See also ==
- List of Islamic educational institutions
- List of universities in Iraq
