= Abu Theeb =

Iraqi insurgency leader

Abu Theeb is the pseudonym of a leader of a Sunni group taking part in the Iraqi insurgency, operating north of Baghdad.

During the time of the referendum a journalist from The Guardian spent five days with his group, and wrote a report in 2005.

== Personal life ==
According to The Guardian, Abu Theeb was born ~40 years ago at the time of interview and had a brother who was killed during Iran–Iraq War. He studied law in University of Baghdad before joining Iraqi National Security Council.
