= Jamaat Jaysh Ahl al-Sunnah wa-l-Jamaah =

Iraqi Sunni insurgent group

Jaysh Ahl al-Sunnah wa-l-Jamaah جيش أهل السنة والجماعة
- Leader: Abu Bakr al-Baghdadi
- Dates active: Late 2005 – October 16, 2006
- Active regions: Iraq
- Ideology: Sunni Islamism Salafism; Salafi jihadism
- Part of: MSC (from January 15, 2006)
- Wars: Iraq War, Iraqi insurgency

Jaysh Ahl al-Sunnah wa-l-Jamaah (Arabic: جيش أهل السنة والجماعة, lit. 'Army and Group for the People of the Sunnah') was an Iraqi Salafi insurgent group that fought against US troops and their local allies during the Iraq War. In 2006 the group aligned itself with al-Qaeda and helped establish the Mujahideen Shura Council.

== History ==
Following the US invasion of Iraq, Abu Bakr al-Baghdadi, along with some associates, created Jamaat Jaysh Ahl al-Sunnah wa-l-Jamaah (JJASJ) and it operated in Samarra, Diyala, and Baghdad.

Abu Bakr al-Baghdadi served as head of the group and led it to establish caliphate.

On January 15, 2006, an organization known as the Mujahideen Shura Council announced its establishment. Jaysh Ahl al-Sunnah wa-l-Jamaah has been declared one of its constituent groups, along with al-Qaeda in Iraq, the Monotheism Brigades, the Sarai al-Jihad group, the al-Ghurab Brigades and the al-Ahwal Brigades.

The dissolution of the Jaysh Ahl al-Sunnah wa-l-Jamaah group occurred after the announcement of the rise of the Islamic State of Iraq just like the rest of the groups of the Mujahideen Shura Council, and Abu Bakr became one of the fighters under command of Abu Omar al-Baghdadi, and he assumed in that time a number of responsibilities among them amirship of the Shari'i committees in the Islamic State. He would eventually go on to succeed Abu Omar al-Baghdadi as emir of the Islamic State of Iraq the latter's death and he would eventually establish the Islamic State.

== See also ==
- List of armed groups in the Iraqi Civil War
- Al-Qaeda in Iraq
- Iraqi insurgency
