= Abu Omar al-Baghdadi =

First leader of the Islamic State of Iraq (1964–2010)

Amir al-Mu'minin Abu Omar al-Baghdadi
- أبو عمر البغدادي
- Mugshot of Abu Omar al-Baghdadi

1st Emir of the Islamic State of Iraq (Note: Also known as 3rd Emir of Mujahideen Shura Council)
- In office 15 October 2006 – 18 April 2010
- Preceded by: Abu Ayyub al-Masri
- Succeeded by: Abu Bakr al-Baghdadi

Emir of Jaish al-Ta'ifa al-Mansurah
- In office 2004 – October 2006
- Preceded by: Position established
- Succeeded by: Position dissolved

Personal details
- Born: Hamid Dawud Mohamed Khalil al-Zawi حَامِدُ دَاوُدَ مُحَمَّدُ خَلِيلِ ٱلزَّاوِيِّ 1964 Al-Zawiyah, Al-Anbar Governorate, Iraq
- Died: 18 April 2010 (aged 45–46) Tikrit, Saladin Governorate, Iraq
- Cause of death: Ground Raid
- Military career
- Allegiance: Ba'athist Iraq (until late 1980s or early 1990s); Jaish al-Ta'ifa al-Mansurah (2004–2006); Mujahideen Shura Council (January 2006–October 2006); Islamic State of Iraq (2006–2010)
- Branch: Iraqi Police (–late 1980s/early 1990s); Islamic State of Iraq (2006–2010)
- Rank: Police officer (–late 1980s/early 1990s); Emir of the Islamic State of Iraq

Abu Omar al-Baghdadi (Note: Arabic: أبو عمر البغدادي, romanized: ʾAbū ʿUmar al-Baghdādī; /ˈɑːbuː ˈoʊmɑːr ɑːl bɑːɡˈdɑːdi/ AH-boo OH-mar ahl bahg-DAHD-ee) (1964 – 18 April 2010), born Hamid Dawud Mohamed Khalil al-Zawi, (Note: Arabic: حَامِدُ دَاوُدَ مُحَمَّدُ خَلِيلِ ٱلزَّاوِيِّ, romanized: Ḥamīd Dāwud Muḥammad Ḵalīl az-Zāwī) was an Iraqi militant who was the emir of the Sunni Islamist militant umbrella organization Mujahideen Shura Council (MSC), and its successor, the Islamic State of Iraq (ISI), which fought against the U.S.-led Coalition forces during the Iraqi insurgency.

== Biography ==
Abu Omar al-Baghdadi was born Hamid Dawud Mohamed Khalil al-Zawi in 1964, in the village of Al-Zawiyah, Al-Anbar Governorate. He descended from the Qurayshi Al-Arajiyah. His father was Muhammad Khalil al-Zawi, a prominent sheikh in the village. He graduated from the Police Academy in Baghdad, and served as a police officer in Haditha, near Al-Zawiyah. In 1993, he was dismissed from the police due to his Salafist ideology.

He then worked at an electronics repair shop, and served as the imam of the al-Asaf Mosque.

Following the 2003 invasion of Iraq by the U.S.-led Coalition forces, he formed his own small insurgent group which was called Jaish al-Ta'ifa al-Mansurah in May 2004, and took part in the Iraqi insurgency. The group gained notoriety on 31 August 2005, when it shelled the nearby Al-Aimmah Bridge, killing seven people and wounding 35.

At some point, al-Baghdadi was arrested after U.S. forces searched his house on suspicion he was harboring foreign Arab fighters. He was transported to Al-Asad Airbase, and his computer was searched. Following his release, he decided to start working in the Jama'at al-Tawhid wal-Jihad organisation after meeting Abu Musab al-Zarqawi, Abu Muhammad al-Lubnani, and Abu Anas al-Shami. At this time, al-Baghdadi went by the kunya Abu Mahmud.

Around this time, when he was traveling from Haditha to Baghdad by car with his family, a car ahead of him was a militant escort vehicle that was scouting the road for American checkpoints. After the escort vehicle had pulled away, there was a checkpoint on the road before entry into the city of Hit where his vehicle was inspected. He was asked by one of the guards to show his identification card and he presented his Al-Arajiah notables identification card. The soldier was surprised and thought that al-Baghdadi was a Shia. The soldier said to him, "Sayyid how could you come to such a place, as these areas are filled with terrorists, and if they know about you, they will kill you." The soldier told him there was news from Haditha that a major terrorist who had left Haditha accompanied by his family, and that he was heading east, and they must search all the vehicles. The soldier did not search al-Baghdadi's vehicle, and al-Baghdadi told the Americans there was no need to search him. Al-Baghdadi was allowed to leave the checkpoint.

After his work in Anbar, al-Baghdadi was transferred to Baghdad where he worked in the Mujahideen Shura Council and Shari'ah Council of the organization. His kunya at that time was Abu-Marwah. He was also in charge of security in Baghdad Province for some time. Afterwards, he became the governor of Diyala for the group. Following the death of al-Zarqawi on 7 June 2006, al-Baghdadi succeeded him as the emir of the MSC, where he worked alongside Abu Ayyub al-Masri. The MSC was then disbanded and replaced by the Islamic State of Iraq, in which al-Baghdadi was announced as its emir, and al-Masri was announced as the Minister of War for the organisation. Following the establishment of ISI, al-Baghdadi announced that all Sunni militant groups operating in Iraq should pay allegiance to him and join the ISI.

== Controversy over identity ==
In July 2007, U.S. military spokesman Brigadier General Kevin Bergner, claimed that al-Baghdadi did not actually exist, and that all of his audio statements were actually read by an elderly Iraqi actor.

The detainee identified as Khaled al-Mashhadani, a self-proclaimed intermediary to Osama bin Laden, claimed that al-Baghdadi was a fictional character created to give an Iraqi face to a foreign-run group. In March 2008, the spokesman for a rival insurgent organization, Hamas of Iraq, also claimed that al-Baghdadi was a fabrication made by al-Qaeda to put an Iraqi face on their organization. However, U.S. officials later came to believe that the position of al-Baghdadi had been back-filled by an actual commander.

== Reports of arrest or death ==
The Interior Ministry of Iraq claimed that al-Baghdadi was captured in Baghdad on 9 March 2007, but it was later said that the person in question was not him. On 3 May 2007, the Iraqi Interior Ministry said that al-Baghdadi had been killed by American and Iraqi forces north of Baghdad. On 23 April 2009, Agence France-Presse reported that he had been arrested by the Iraqi military, and on 28 April, the Iraqi government produced photos to prove this. The claim was denied by ISI, which released a recording of al-Baghdadi denying the government's claims. The Iraqi government continued to insist that the man captured was indeed al-Baghdadi. However, tapes and messages from al-Baghdadi continued to be released throughout 2009 and 2010.

== Death ==
On April 18th 2010, al-Baghdadi was killed when U.S. and Iraqi forces raided a safe house 10 kilometres (6 mi) southwest of Tikrit. Al-Baghdadi's son and al-Masri were also killed, and 16 others were arrested.

Iraqi Prime Minister Nouri al-Maliki announced the killings of al-Baghdadi and al-Masri at a news conference in Baghdad and showed reporters photographs of their corpses. "The attack was carried out by ground forces which surrounded the house, and also through the use of missiles. During the operation, computers were seized with emails and messages [to] bin Laden and [his deputy] Ayman al-Zawahiri", al-Maliki added. U.S. General Raymond T. Odierno said: "The death of these terrorists is potentially the most significant blow to al-Qaeda [operations] in Iraq since the beginning of the insurgency. There is still work to do but this is a significant step forward in ridding Iraq of terrorists".

U.S. Vice President Joe Biden said that the killings were "potentially devastating" blows to ISI, and proof that Iraqi security forces were gaining ground. On 25 April 2010, a four-page statement by ISI was posted on a militant website, confirming the deaths of al-Baghdadi and al-Masri. It read, in part: "After a long journey filled with sacrifices and fighting falsehood and its representatives, two knights have dismounted to join the group of martyrs. We announce that the Muslim nation has lost two of the leaders of jihad, and two of its men, who are only known as heroes on the path of jihad."

The ISI Sharia minister, Abu al-Walid Abd al-Wahhab al-Mashadani, said that al-Baghdadi and al-Masri were attending a meeting when enemy forces engaged them in battle and launched an airstrike on their location. Al-Baghdadi was succeeded by Abu Bakr al-Baghdadi, who later declared himself as the "caliph" of the Islamic State (IS) organization.

== See also ==
- April 2009 Baghdad–Miqdadiyah suicide attacks
- Abu Suleiman al-Naser

== Notes ==
Political offices
New office	Emir of the Islamic State of Iraq; 2006–2010	Succeeded by Abu Bakr al-Baghdadi
