= Mujahideen Shura Council (Iraq) =

2006 umbrella organization of 6+ Sunni insurgent groups in Iraq

- Majlis Shura al-Mujahideen
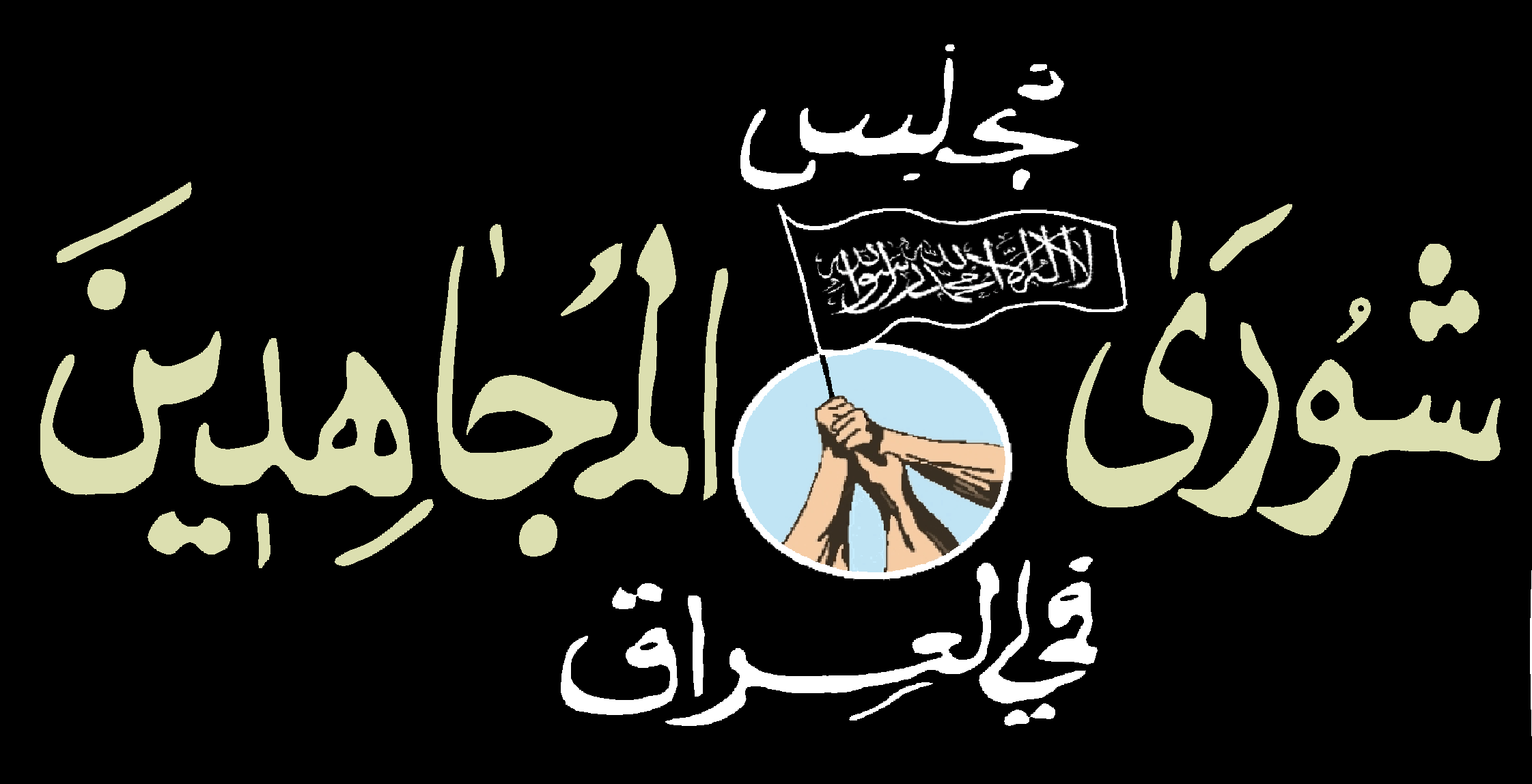
- Emblem of the Mujahideen Shura Council, featuring three hands holding a jihadist flag and Arabic calligraphy of the group's name
- Leaders: Abu Musab al-Zarqawi † (15 January 2006 – 7 June 2006); Abu Ayyub al-Masri (7 June 2006 – 15 October 2006)
- Dates active: 15 January 2006 – 15 October 2006
- Groups: Al-Qaeda in Iraq; Jamaat Jaysh Ahl al-Sunnah wa-l-Jamaah; Jaish al-Ta'ifa al-Mansurah; Katbiyan Ansar al-Tawhid wal Sunnah; Saraya al-Jihad Group; Al-Ghuraba Brigades; Al-Ahwal Brigades; Jaysh al-Fatiheen
- Headquarters: Al Anbar Governorate
- Active regions: Iraq
- Ideology: Sunni Islamism; Jihadism; Qutbism; Salafi Jihadism
- Part of: Al-Qaeda

The Mujahideen Shura Council in Iraq (Arabic: مجلس شورى المجاهدين في العراق, romanized: Majlis Shūrā al-Mujāhidīn fī al-ʿIrāq, abbr. MSC), was an umbrella organization of at least six Sunni Islamist insurgent groups taking part in the Iraqi insurgency against U.S.-led Coalition and Iraqi forces. The groups included in the MSC were: Al-Qaeda in Iraq, Jaish al-Ta'ifa al-Mansurah (Army of the Victorious Sect), Katbiyan Ansar Al-Tawhid wal Sunnah, Saraya al-Jihad Group, al-Ghuraba Brigades, al-Ahwal Brigades, and Jaysh al-Fatiheen. In mid-October 2006, a statement was released, stating that the Mujahideen Shura Council had been disbanded, and was replaced by the Islamic State of Iraq (ISI).

== Formation and names ==
On 15 January 2006, in a statement posted to the jihadist website Hanin Net, al-Qaeda in Iraq spokesman Abu Maysarah al-Iraqi announced the formation of the "Mujahideen Consultative Council" ("Majlis Shura al-Mujahideen"). It was formed to resist efforts by the American and Iraqi authorities to win over Sunni supporters of the insurgency. The stated purpose of the council was "Managing the struggle in the battle of confrontation to ward off the invading kafir (infidels) and their apostate stooges...Uniting the word of the mujahideen and closing their ranks...[and] determining a clear position toward developments and incidents so that people can see things clearly and the truth will not be confused with falsehood."

Under the banner of Mujahideen Shura Council, AQI formed a coalition with seven other insurgent groups opposed to the forces of the U.S.-led coalition. The groups in the Mujahideen Shura Council (MSC) included:

- Al-Qaeda in Iraq
- Jamaat Jaysh Ahl al-Sunnah wa-l-Jamaah
- Jaish al-Ta'ifa al-Mansurah
- Katbiyan Ansar al-Tawhid wal Sunnah
- Saraya al-Jihad Group
- Al-Ghuraba Brigades
- Al-Ahwal Brigades
- Jaysh al-Fatiheen

AQI continued to claim responsibility for attacks through the new council. Other sources called the council Mujahideen Shura Council in Iraq or Mujahideen Consultative Council. Around 25 April 2006, a videotape of Abu Musab al-Zarqawi was released bearing the organization's logo.

== Structure ==
Little is known about the organizational structure of the Council, in large part due to the shadowy nature of the organization itself. Al-Qaeda in Iraq was the most powerful and visible group in the MSC. Because of the multiple leaders the Shura Council had, there seems to have been no disruption in the Shura Council's ability to carry out attacks, with more than 1,600 Iraqi civilians killed in the month after Zarqawi's death, the largest number killed in a month to that date. Elements of the Shura Council's organization from the top to the bottom remain fluid due both to the nature of its aims and methods as well as its loose confederation. It was speculated that the group was dominated by al Qaeda in Iraq and that Zarqawi's death dealt a severe blow to the unity of the Council. Aside from the murky workings of the Shura Council's leadership it is known that the Council has rather smooth operations when it comes to propaganda, the Council's propaganda czar, Murasel, regularly posted updates, criticisms, and praises for the Council's own acts of violence on a semi-daily basis at blogspot.com.

== MSC forms Mutayibeen Coalition ==
MSC, including AQI, on 12 October 2006 announced their "Mutayibeen Coalition" consisting of MSC, three smaller insurgent groups, and six 'loyal' Anbar Sunni tribes counting 300,000 members.

A video on Internet showed six white-clad, masked men, representing: the Mujahideen Shura Council in Iraq; Jaysh Al-Fatihin; Jund Al-Sahaba; Kataib Ansar Al-Tawhid wal-Sunna; and "many of the sheikhs of the faithful tribes [in Iraq]"; taking an Arab "oath of the scented ones" (hilf al-mutayyabin).

They announced:

"...to implement God's sharia, … We swear by Allah to do our utmost to free the prisoners of their shackles, and to rid Sunnis from the oppression of the rejectionists [Shi'ite Muslims] and the crusader occupiers, to assist the oppressed and restore rights even at the price of our own lives… to make Allah's word supreme in the world, and to restore the glory of Islam".

== MSC becomes part of Islamic State of Iraq ==
On the 13 and 15 October 2006, messages on Internet purportedly in the name of MSC and the Mutayibeen Coalition declared the establishment of the Islamic State of Iraq (ISI) which should encompass the governorates of Baghdad, Anbar, Diyala, Kirkuk, Saladin, Nineveh and parts of Babil and Wasit – a swathe of central and western Iraq where most Sunni Arabs live.

Abu Omar al-Baghdadi was being announced as the state's Emir. A Mujahideen Shura Council leader said: "God willing we will set the law of Sharia here and we will fight the Americans". The Council urged on Sunni Muslim tribal leaders to join their separate Islamic state "to protect our religion and our people, to prevent strife and so that the blood and sacrifices of your martyrs are not lost".

In reality, the group was not known to control any territory in Iraq yet. Following the announcement, scores of gunmen took part in military parades in Ramadi and other Anbar towns to celebrate.
