= Jaish al-Ta'ifa al-Mansurah =

Iraqi Sunni insurgent group – 2004 to 2006

Jaish al-Ta'ifa al-Mansurah جيش الطائفة المنصورة
- Leader: Abu Omar al-Baghdadi
- Dates active: 2004 – 16 October 2006
- Active regions: Iraq
- Ideology: Salafist jihadism Anti-Shi'ism
- Part of: MSC (from 15 January 2006)
- Wars: Iraq War, Iraqi insurgency

Jaish al-Ta'ifa al-Mansurah (Arabic: جيش الطائفة المنصورة, romanized: Army of the Victorious Sect) was an Iraqi Salafi jihadist insurgent group that fought against US troops and their local allies during the Iraq War. In 2006 the group aligned itself with al-Qaeda and helped establish the Mujahideen Shura Council.

== History ==
The group was founded by Abu Omar al-Baghdadi with the support of Abu Musab al-Zarqawi, but exactly when is uncertain.

In May 2004, Jaish al-Taif al-Mansour kidnapped Interenergoservice workers Alexander Gordienko and Andrei Meshcherakov and demanded the withdrawal of foreign forces from Iraq.

This group gained notoriety on August 31, 2005, due to the mortar shelling near the Al-Aimmah Bridge over the Tigris river, across which a Shia procession marched to the tomb of imam Musa al-Kazim. As a result of the bombing, 7 people were killed and 35 injured, and another 935-1033 people died and 322-815 were injured in the ensuing stampede on the bridge in what became known as the 2005 Al-Aimmah Bridge disaster.

On January 15, 2006, an organization known as the Mujahideen Shura Council in Iraq announced its establishment. Jaish al-Ta'ifa al-Mansurah was declared one of its constituent groups, along with al-Qaeda in Iraq, the Monotheism Brigades, the Saraya al-Jihad group, the al-Ghurab Brigades and the al-Ahwal Brigades.

== See also ==
- Al-Qaeda in Iraq
- Iraqi insurgency
