= Abu Ali al-Anbari =

IS deputy leader (died 2016)

- عبد الرحمن مصطفى القادولي
- Abd al-Rahman Mustafa al-Qaduli
- Born: Abd al-Rahman Mustafa al-Qaduli; 1957 or 1959; Al-Hadar, Nineveh, Iraq
- Died: c. 25 March 2016 (aged between 56 and 59); Deir ez-Zor Governorate, Syria
- Military career
- Allegiance: Baathist Iraq (1980–1988); Ansar al-Islam (2000–2003); Jama'at al-Tawhid wal-Jihad (2003–2004); Al-Qaeda (2004–2006); Al-Qaeda in Iraq (2004–2006); Islamic State of Iraq (2012 – April 2013); Islamic State of Iraq and the Levant (April 2013 – June 2014); Islamic State (June 2014 – March 2016)
- Service years: 2000–2016
- Rank: Private in the Iraqi army Deputy leader of the Islamic State in Syria
- Conflicts: Iran–Iraq War; Iraq War; Syrian civil war; War in Iraq (2013–2017)

Abd al-Rahman Mustafa al-Qaduli (Arabic: عَبْدُ ٱلرَّحْمَٰنِ مُصْطَفَى ٱلْقَادُولِيِّ, romanized: ʿAbd ar-Raḥmān Muṣṭafā al-Qādūlī; 1957 or 1959 – c. 25 March 2016), also known as Abdullah bin Rashed al-Baghdadi, better known by his nom de guerre Abu Ali al-Anbari (Arabic: أَبُو عَليِّ ٱلْأَنْبَارِيِّ, romanized: ʾAbū ʿAlī al-ʾAnbārī), was the governor for territories held by the Islamic State (IS) in Syria. Considered the IS second-in-command (along with Abu Muslim al-Turkmani, his counterpart in Iraq), he was viewed as a potential successor of IS leader Abu Bakr al-Baghdadi.

On 14 May 2014, he was listed as a Specially Designated Global Terrorist by the U.S Treasury Department, and on 5 May 2015, the U.S. Department of State announced a reward of up to US$7 million for information leading to his capture or death.

On 25 March 2016, the U.S. Department of Defense announced al-Qaduli’s death as a result of a US Special Operations helicopter gunship raid conducted earlier that week along the Iraq-Syria border.

== Names ==
Abd al-Rahman Mustafa al-Qaduli used at least seven aliases, including Abu Ali al-Anbari, Abu Ala al-Afri (Arabic: أَبُو عَلَاءِ ٱلْعَفْرِيِّ, romanized: ʾAbū ʿAlāʾ al-ʿAfrī), Abu Jasim al-Iraqi, Abu Umar Qardash, Abu Ali Qardash al-Turkmani, Hajji Iman and al-Dar Islami. The Daily Beast reported that confusion caused by these aliases led Iraqi and American security officials to think that Abu Ali al-Anbari and Abu Ala al-Afri were separate senior IS leaders.

== Biography ==
Abd al-Rahman Mustafa al-Qaduli is believed to have been born in 1957 or 1959 in Al-Hadar, Nineveh, 80 km south of Mosul, to a Sunni Arab family who were Arabized, but were of Turkmen and Armenian descent. His family was known to be very pious and conservative.

According to his IS biography, he was descended from the Quraysh. Biographical writings by his son, also a jihadist, state that al-Qaduli enrolled in the Iraqi army after completing his studies in sharia at an institute of Tel Afar, fighting in the Iran-Iraq war as a private. During this period, he obtained a degree in Islamic studies at the University of Baghdad in 1982.

After his military service Abu Ali became increasingly radicalised. He first taught sharia in the small town of Mujama Barzan. On one occasion he vehemently opposed the organising of a party at which one of the city's socialites invited Ghajars — an ethnic group closely related to Romanis — renowned for their music and dancing. He was planning to attack the Ghajars, burning their tents and killing them but he limited himself to giving very inflammatory sermons. The party was eventually cancelled because of the pressure generated by al-Qaduli's speeches and incitements to violence.

In the mid-1990s, al-Anbari returned to Tal Afar, where he taught in a school and became the imam of a mosque. Tal Afar is a Turkmen city populated by Shiites and Sunnis. As an imam, al-Anbari expressed radical Salafist views and violently attacked Shiites, as well as Sufis. He also began to associate with Kurdish jihadists active in the mountains of northern Iraq.

=== Afghanistan ===
Al-Qaduli was believed to have travelled to Afghanistan in 1998 and trained with al-Qaeda. It was there that he was said to have earned the trust and respect of Osama bin Laden.

== Iraq ==
In 2000, he moved from Afghanistan to the area of Iraqi Kurdistan under control by Ansar al-Islam. He fled to Afghanistan following the 2003 US invasion of Iraq, only to return in the summer of 2003 to the Sulaymaniyah province of Iraqi Kurdistan where the Ansar al-Islam organisation still held some territory in the mountains east of the city. He soon started his own Turkmen Islamist insurgent group, Saraya al-Jihad (Squadrons of Jihad or the Jihad Squads), which was active around Tal Afar. During this time he was part of a group, along with Abu Muslim al-Turkmani, who led the military training. He later became a member of Ansar al-Islam.

Ansar al-Islam evolved into Jamaat Ansar al-Sunna and Al-Qaduli was a sharia authority in this group. According to his biography, Al-Qaduli was responsible for arranging a meeting between Abu Abdullah al-Shafi'i, leader of Ansar al-Sunnah and Abu Musab al-Zarqawi, then leader of Jama'at al-Tawhid wal-Jihad. The meeting was to discuss a merger, which Shafi declined on the pretence of needing to ask his soldiers. Al-Qaduli pledged allegiance to Zarqawi and most of the members of Ansar al-Sunnah followed him in doing so. Soon after this, he was briefly arrested in late 2003 or early 2004, but was freed after a few months since authorities were not aware of his importance.

=== Al-Qaeda in Iraq ===
Following his allegiance to Abu Musab al-Zarqawi in 2004, and joining Al-Qaida in Iraq, he was responsible for overseeing the Sharia authorities in northern Iraq and serving as al-Qaeda in Iraq's local leader in Mosul.

It was often said that he was one of the founding members of the Mujahideen Shura Council (MSC) which was formed by al-Zarqawi in January 2006, but in fact he was elected the leader of the MSC under the pseudonym Abu Abdullah Rashid al-Baghdadi.

In February 2006, he travelled to Pakistan on behalf of Abu Musab al-Zarqawi to meet with leaders of al-Qaeda and explain to them the reality of the situation in Iraq and disprove the allegations issued by the leaders of Ansar al-Sunnah who had been criticising Zarqawi to Atiyah Abd al-Rahman.

According to the Islamic State's newsletter, al-Naba, he was arrested on 16 April 2006 in Yusufiya during Operation Larchwood 4 and was imprisoned at Abu Ghraib prison for a second time. The Americans believed him to be the emir of Tal Afar but were unaware of his true status. While imprisoned, Qaduli mentored Manaf Abd al-Rahim al-Rawi and Huthaifa al-Batawi, who went on to become governors of Baghdad for the group.

== Islamic State of Iraq ==
When al-Zarqawi's successors, Abu Omar al-Baghdadi and Abu Ayyub al-Masri were killed in a joint U.S-Iraqi raid in 2010, the Islamic State of Iraq had to choose a new successor. According to Al-Monitor, Osama bin Laden wanted al-Qaduli to become the group's new leader. Islamic State sources confirmed that Osama bin Laden appointed Abu Ali al-Anbari to lead ISI, but affirm that his instruction came too late, two weeks after a pledge had already been made in May 2010 to appoint Abu Bakr al-Baghdadi as the new leader.

Islamic State sources affirm that he was in charge of coordinating day-to-day military operations of the Islamic State in al-Sham. He was seen as a gifted speaker and served as a Sharii, and while he was in Raqqa, he gave a series of recorded lectures (more than 40 hours) at al-Imam al-Nawawi Mosque, that summarise the Aqida of the Islamic State and attempted to break down the arguments of man-made constitutions and laws, parliaments, courts, and democratic norms like devolution of power and popular sovereignty. One of his lectures in the northern Aleppo area was included in the 19th episode of the “Messages from the Land of Epics” video series by al-Furqan Media Foundation.

=== Syrian Civil War and ISIL ===
In early 2012, al-Qaduli was released from prison in Iraq, after which he rejoined the Islamic State of Iraq only a few days after his release. His first task was to establish communications with the various al-Qaeda affiliates around the world, which had been broken due to the security circumstances the group faced. The leaders of the central command of al-Qaeda had criticised the Islamic State of Iraq and ISI leaders believed that was due to their ignorance of the situation on the ground.

During late 2012, al-Qaduli was sent to Syria to keep an eye on Ahmed al-Sharaa and investigate the situation there, since Julani was failing to follow IS policy in various respects and had been building up his own power base in an attempt to split Jabhat al-Nusra from ISI. Qaduli sent messengers and held meetings with field commanders of various Syrian rebel groups, offering them money and weapons to switch allegiance to ISIL. Some did so publicly, defecting with men and weapons, others did so in secret, remaining affiliated with their existing groups while organising the targeted assassinations of rivals. Memory sticks found by Iraqi security forces during a 2014 raid on the home of Abu Abdulrahman al-Bilawi, ISIL's military chief of staff, identified al-Qaduli, named as Abu Ali al-Anbari, as being the overall head of ISIL military and non-military operations within Syria.

According to his IS biography, at first Qaduli was not overly concerned by Julani since he "thought well of him, and thought the reports about him were the pure quarrels of a kind that occur between soldiers and their leaders." He later "saw with his own eyes the errors in the conduct of the work, and the deviation that was common among the soldiers and the leaders" due to a "neglect of shari’a education and training". Despite this, Qaduli felt that these mistakes could be remedied by more effort, and so he decided to live in the same house as Julani to "study his personality, and to assess his ability to lead." In January 2013, Qaduli sent a message to ISI leader Abu Bakr al-Baghdadi in Iraq, warning him about al-Sharaa. He wrote "He is a sneaky person with two faces. He loves himself and does not care about the religion of his soldiers. He is willing to sacrifice their blood just so he is mentioned in the media. He flies with joy like a child when his name is mentioned on the TV channels." Upon receiving the letter from Qaduli, Baghdadi decided to travel to Syria himself to try and correct the situation. In March 2013 there was a meeting between Qaduli, Baghdadi, Julani, Abu Maria al-Qahtani and some others where Julani cried and promised he would renew his allegiance to Baghdadi. Through this deception Julani hoped to buy time to split the organisation, though Baghdadi was not deceived.

While in Syria, he was responsible for the Shari’a Council and a member of the Delegated Committee in Syria. He also worked to build the Dawawin or ministries of the new state and he was working from Raqqa which was the capital of the Islamic State. Sometime after the June 2014 Fall of Mosul, Qaduli decided to return to Tal Afar in Iraq where he participated in battles around the city and near Sinjar against the Peshmerga and the Kurdistan Workers' Party. He actively took part in the Sinjar massacres of the minority religious group Yazidis. Some time later, he moved to Mosul and returned to government work on the Islamic Monetary Project, introducing the new gold currency of the Islamic State.

Al-Qaduli is rumoured to have favoured reconciliation with al-Qaeda and its Syrian affiliate Al-Nusra Front, after al-Qaeda cut off ties with ISIL in early 2014. He also reportedly believed ISIL's leadership should be composed of both Arabs and foreigners, in contrast to the dominance of Iraqis in the group.

Al-Qaduli was a key coordination link between al-Baghdadi and his inner circle and his emirs in different provinces across the group's territory in Syria, Iraq and Libya. The New York Times reported in November 2015 that al-Qaduli had visited Libya, where IS had established a powerful branch centred in the city of Sirte.

In March 2015, it was rumoured that Abu Bakr al-Baghdadi, leader of IS, had suffered injuries, leaving him incapacitated. Hisham al-Hashimi wrote of al-Qaduli: "He is smart, and a good leader and administrator. If Baghdadi ends up dying, he will lead them." According to The New York Observer, al-Qaduli was described by people who knew him as being dynamic, possessing operational experience and having very good contacts. It was reported that he was a charismatic preacher. But most importantly, al-Qaduli supposedly excelled in battle strategy. That is where he made his mark both in al-Qaeda and in IS.

== Reports of death ==
According to the Iraqi Defence Ministry, Abdulrahman Mustafa al-Qaduli was killed on 12 May 2015, in a US-led coalition air-strike on a mosque in Tal Afar. The air-strike was reported to have killed dozens of other militants present. However, the video of the attack shown by the Iraqi Defence ministry was actually of a Coalition air-strike in Mosul, 40 miles away, on 4 May. The U.S. Defense Department said that it had no information to corroborate the claims, and United States Central Command stated that no mosques had been struck by Coalition aircraft. The Iraqi media again reported al-Qaduli’s death in a 12 December 2015 air-strike, but this was also disputed.

== Confirmed death ==
United States Secretary of Defense Ashton Carter, in a joint media briefing with Chairman of the Joint Chiefs of Staff General Joseph Dunford on 25 March 2016, announced al-Qaduli's death, correcting earlier erroneous claims.

US Special Operations forces commanded by JSOC arrived via helicopter in the Deir ez-Zor Governorate to arrest al-Qaduli in eastern Syria near the Syrian–Iraqi border, while he and three other IS members were travelling in a vehicle coming from Raqqa. The US Special Operations forces ordered him to exit the vehicle. When he refused and pulled out an assault rifle instead, US forces fired at the vehicle, killing him and the other passengers on board. US commandos also seized electronics and other documents during the operation for intelligence purposes. On 30 April 2016, IS acknowledged al-Qaduli's death and launched a series of attacks across Iraq and Syria named "The Battle of Abu Ali Al-Anbari" in his honour.
