= Western Nineveh offensive (2017) =

Operation by Iraqi PMF against ISIL in Iraq

2017 Western Nineveh offensive
- Part of the Battle of Mosul (2016–2017) and the War in Iraq (2013–2017)
Date	25 April 2017 – 27 June 2017 (2 months and 2 days)
Location	Western Nineveh Governorate, Iraq
Status	Decisive Iraqi victory: The PMF captured the towns of al-Ba'aj, the al-Hadar, Hatra, al-Qahtaniya and al-Qairawan as well as the Sahl Sinjar Air Base and reached the Iraqi-Syrian border
Territorial changes	The PMF captured more than 3,500 square kilometres of territory and over 110 villages from IS

Belligerents
Iraq; Limited air support: CJTF–OIR: United States	Islamic State (IS)

Commanders and leaders
(Iraq) Abu Mahdi al-Muhandis (PMF operations commander)	(Islamic State) Abu-Sayf al-'Isawi † (IS media emir) (Islamic State) Abu-Khattab al-Rawi † (IS media emir) (Islamic State) Hassan Kanahs al-Zebeidi † (IS commando leader)

Units involved
Iraq: Popular Mobilization Forces (PMF); Air Force; Iraqi Army; 15th Infantry Division	Unknown

Casualties and losses
20 soldiers killed	507 militants killed

The 2017 Western Nineveh offensive, code-named Operation Muhammad, Prophet of God, was launched by the Iraqi Popular Mobilization Forces (PMF) against the Islamic State (IS) in the western Nineveh province of northern Iraq in late April 2017.

== The offensive ==
=== Push to the southwest ===
PMF forces launched their offensive against IS on 25 April, some 100 kilometers southwest of Mosul. PMF also launched an operation to clear the town of Al-Hadar and its surrounding villages from IS forces, seizing three villages. By the end of the first day, they had captured 12 villages in the region.

PMU announced during the afternoon of 26 April that they had captured the ruins of the ancient city of Hatra. They also stated they had advanced to the edge of the nearby modern town. The city is also strategically significant as it commands access to Nineveh, Saladin and Anbar Governorate. By the third day of the offensive, the PMF had captured 17 villages. They also took over 3 villages in the region during the day and another along with a cemetery. The nearby modern town of Al-Hadar was captured on 27 May. The advance cut-off several desert tracks used by IS to move between Iraq and Syria.

Three days later, the PMF pushed out of al-Hadar in three directions northwest of the town, capturing another five villages. Meanwhile, PMF intelligence announced that the operation in Al-Hadar was sudden and rapid and placed IS in a critical situation in the neighboring Baaj area. Some people started returning to their villages after the buildings had been cleared of mines by the PMF.

=== Push to the west ===
==== Push to al-Qairawan ====
On 12 May, the PMF launched the second phase of their offensive, with an operation 100 kilometers west of Mosul. The aim was to secure the towns of al-Qairawan and Al-Ba'aj areas and push IS militants further towards the border with Syria. The offensive was backed by Iraqi Air Force's helicopters. The PMU later announced that it had captured four villages while clashing in two other villages. It later announced that it had captured 21 villages around al-Qairawan, killing 77 militants and destroying 15 VBIEDs.

On 13 May, PMF stated that it had captured four villages and surrounded one while also capturing the road between Shingal and Qairawan. The Joint Operations Command (JOC) stated during the day that they had captured 11 villages around al-Qairawan. The paramilitary forces surrounded the town from three sides, while cutting off the main roads between it and Tal Afar as well as Sinjar. It also stated that an Iraqi Air Force helicopter was shot down, after it came under fire from IS while supporting PMF to capture villages located in the desert to the west of Mosul.

The PMF stated on 14 May that it had captured the villages of Khailo and Tal al-Qasab near al-Qairawan besides surrounding another village. The statement added that the paramilitary forces were continuously surrounding al-Qairawan from three sides, and had killed 23 militants while also destroying four car bombs. JOC stated that Iraqi fighter jets had carried out an airstrike on a village near Tal Afar, killing 13 militants and destroying three vehicles carrying rocket launchers. The PMF meanwhile announced it had captured eight villages to the north and south of the Qayrawan region as part of their operation to drive out the militants from areas near Iraq-Syria border, killing 39 of them in the clashes.

The Iraqi military stated on 16 May that the PMU captured three villages to the north and south of al-Qairawan in addition to clashing in another village. By 17 May, 70 percent of the PMF's initial goals as part of their push to the west of Mosul were achieved following the capture or surrounding of more than 30 villages. PMF said that they had cut off a road linking Tal Qasab and Qairawan, which is considered the main IS supply route north of Qairawan. Its first brigade repelled an attack by IS, which left four attackers dead, and stated that 70 percent of a first phase of clearing operations to recapture the al-Qairawan region has been completed.

On 18 May, the PMF captured the Sahl Sinjar Air Base which Karim al-Nuri of the Badr Organisation stated would be used as a base by the PMF and Iraqi Air Force to chase militants across the desert with Syria. The Iraqi military stated that the paramilitary forces had also captured eight villages near Qayrawan, killing 54 IS fighters in addition to destroying a headquarters of the group. Maj. Gen. Najm al-Jubouri stated that Iraqi troops will target the town of Tal Afar, after the recapture of Mosul, while officials say 750 fighters still remain in the town. Militants launched several attacks against PMU checkpoints on 20 May in the village Deheila, west of Mosul, leaving seven PMU personnel dead and others injured.

On 21 May, the PMF announced that it had captured 7 villages including four villages to south of al-Qairawan, Tal Qasab, 2 villages to the north of al-Qairawan while cutting off the IS supply route between the villages of al-Hatmiya and Tal Qasab. The War Media Cell stated on 22 May that eleven militants, including two Arabs were killed and a so-called hisbah (vigilantism) office was destroyed in an airstrike on Baaj town.

Following a "quick overnight operation", the PMF seized the strategic town of Qayrawan and a number of villages on 23 May. The military stated that it had also captured all the villages around it. The paramilitary groups ended the first stage of their offensive to secure the border with Syria and cut off supply routes between Mosul and Raqqa. The battle left at least 13 PMU fighters killed and nine others injured. Another 41 militants were also killed in the fighting.

==== Push to Al-Ba'aj ====
On 24 May, the PMF launched the second phase of the offensive named the Martyrs of Sinjar. By the next day, the PMF captured Kocho, the home village of Nadia Murad, and handed it over to local Yazidi forces. On the next day, PMU fighters began a push to capture Al-Ba'aj, capturing four villages and a strategic road west of al-Qairawan. By the end of the day, the number of villages captured by the PMU increased to 9. IS headquarters were reportedly attacked in central al-Baaj, western Nineveh, and an IS emir was reportedly killed, according to local sources.

The War Media Cell said on 26 May that an airstrike launched by the Iraqi fighter jets, in support of PMU troops, left 46 militants dead, and four vehicles, two of which were booby-trapped, destroyed in Baaj and Qairawan regions. Iraqi warplanes targeted IS locations in Baaj and Qairawan on the next day, west of Mosul and near the Syrian borders, killing 29 militants. PMU announced on 28 May that they had recaptured the town of al-Qahtaniya, located to the west of al-Qairawan. They added that 19 IS fighters were killed in clashes during the day.

PMU announced it had reached the Iraq-Syria border while dislodging IS from territory to the north of Al-Ba'aj. The statement added that the paramilitary units had killed 21 militants in addition to destroying four of their headquarters in two villages.

On 2 June, PMF killed six members of IS commando forces, including Hassan Kanahs al-Zebeidi, a senior leader, at Matallat al-Markeb village near the Syrian border. On 3 June, it announced the capture of areas near Iraq-Syria border, including the al-Risalah residential complex to the south of al-Ba'aj. On 4 June, more than 500 PMF fighters captured al-Ba'aj, an IS stronghold town near the Syrian border, along with 12 surrounding villages from IS militants, killing at least 33 militants, according to an Iraqi police officer. PMF also announced it had captured 12 nearby villages, killing 37 militants.

=== Post-Ba'aj operations ===
On 5 June, Badr Organization said it had taken over nine villages northwest of Baaj, killing more than 45 IS members, including suicide bombers boarding booby-trapped cars. Shaker al-Afri, a senior IS member, and four others (including a designated area commander) were killed by coalition airstrikes in Tal Afar, according to an Iraqi officer on 6 June.

Iraqi forces captured six villages on 10 June in an operations towards Mahlabiyah. On the next day, the 15th Infantry Division of the Iraqi Army advanced towards Mahlabiyah on 11 June, capturing five villages during the day. Earlier, the PMF had advanced to the area, but avoided entering the two towns of Tal Afar and Mahlabiyah. Dozens of militants were killed as Iraqi airstrikes destroyed militant locations in Tal Afar on 14 June.

JOC stated on 15 June that PMF had captured four villages to the north of Mahlabiyah, in addition to the nearby Mansour industry compound and water facility. War Media Cell announced on 21 May that airstrikes in al-Mahalabiya and Tal Afar town, killed 12 militants and destroyed two booby-trapped vehicles and weapons. Abu Abdullah al-Halabi, the assistant head of IS's so-called "security committee", was shot dead at the center of Tal Afar on 26 June, according to a local source.

Abu Hafsa, who was in charge of IS drones in Tal Afar, was killed along with a number of companions, after an airstrike hit a secret rest house of the group on the outskirts of Tal Afar, which was used for launching drones on 27 June according to a local source. Iraqi army officer Jabbar Hassan meanwhile said that the 15th Infantry Division had captured six villages outside Tal Afar.

== Aftermath ==
The spokesman of Iraq's Counter-Terrorism Service stated on 30 June 2017 that plans were in place to capture Tal Afar as well as Hawija and it would be ready to participate in the battle to take it. Chief of Staff of the Peshmerga Ministry Jabar Yawar told Rudaw on 2 June 2017 that the Iraqi government planned to advance military operations for Tal Afar and Al Anbar Governorate while delaying an offensive for Hawija.

According to a statement on 4 July by Nour Eddin Qablan, deputy chief of Nineveh provincial council, 200 Turkmens were reportedly held and killed by the militants in Tal Afar two months ago, while they were trying to flee to territory under Iraqi control. In addition, a local source stated that the last local leader of the town had been executed by non-Iraqi militants. Twelve militants were meanwhile reported on 8 July to have been killed in Tal Afar in three consecutive airstrikes including a top judiciary official according to local sources, while Ahmed al-Shamri of Nineveh Operations Command stated that the group had executed 10 members for trying to flee.

On 29 July, Prime Minister of Iraq Haider al-Abadi said that the Iraqi government had set a plan to take Tal Afar, "I have put forward a plan to liberate Tal Afar with the participation of all (kinds of) security services, in addition to the Hashd Shaabi and Asha'iry (tribal units)." The participation of Hashd Shaabi had concerned Turkey which doesn't want the offensive to change the region's ethnic composition. On 1 August, PMF's media bureau stated it had captured seventeen villages to the south of Tal Afar. Iraqi forces on 20 August launched an offensive to recapture Tal Afar.

== See also ==
- Northern Iraq offensive (June 2014)
- Northern Iraq offensive (August 2014)
- Sinjar clashes (2017)
- Western Anbar offensive (2017)
