= Abu Sulayman al-Utaybi =

Abu Sulayman al-Utaybi (died May 2008) was a Saudi Arabian Islamic militant who is noted as a critic of the leadership of the Islamic State of Iraq.

== History ==
He was born 1980 in Saudi Arabia. He studied at the prestigious Imam Muhammad ibn Saud Islamic University. He abandoned his studies in 2006 and joined al-Qaeda in Iraq (AQI) His name was in the Sinjar Records, a database of AQI personnel found in September 2007.

He was made Chief Judge of the Islamic State of Iraq in March 2007. He released public sermons in April and June 2007.

He left the Islamic State of Iraq in August 2007 with Abu Dujanah al-Qahtani, and traveled across Iran with the assistance of Ansar al-Sunna to Pakistan.

He was a critic of the leadership of Abu Ayyub al-Masri and Abu Omar al-Baghdadi.

== Death ==
He was killed in an American airstrike in Paktia province, Afghanistan in May 2008.
