= Abu Suleiman al-Naser =

War Minister of the Islamic State of Iraq (died 2011)

- أبو سليمان الناصر

War Minister of the Islamic State of Iraq
- In office April 18, 2010 – February 24, 2011
- Preceded by: Abu Hamza al-Muhajir
- Succeeded by: Haji Bakr

Personal details
- Born: Neaman Salman Mansour al-Zaidi نيمان سلمان منصور الزيدي Rawa, Iraq
- Died: 24 February 2011 Hīt, Iraq
- Cause of death: Shot dead

Military service
- Allegiance: Islamic State of Iraq (October 2006 – February 2011)
- Years of service: Unknown–2011
- Battles/wars: Iraq War

Nu'man Salman Mansour al-Zaidi (Arabic: نعمان سلمان منصور الزيدي; died 24 February 2011), known as Abu Suleiman al-Naser (Arabic: أبو سليمان الناصر), was the military commander or "Minister of War" of the militant group Islamic State of Iraq (ISI) during the Iraq War.

Little is known about Abu Suleiman. He is said to have been born into an ethnic Sunni Arab family in Rawah. He reportedly trained at a JTJ fighter camp in Rawa, Iraq, which was raided by US forces in 2003 and imprisoned at Camp Bucca. He succeeded Abu Ayyub al-Masri as Minister of War for the Islamic State of Iraq (ISI) on 18 April 2010 with Abu Bakr al-Baghdadi as its new emir, after al-Masri and ISI leader Abu Omar al-Baghdadi were killed in an operation by US and Iraqi forces in Tikrit. Abu Suleiman's appointment was announced in a statement in which he used the nom de guerre Al-Nasser Lideen Allah Abu Suleiman (Arabic: الناصر لدين الله أبو سليمان), meaning "Defender of God’s Religion, Father of Suleiman". He is reported to have been a detainee at Camp Bucca prison, and served as the ISI's leader in Anbar Province under the nom de guerre Abu Ibrahim al-Ansari. Following his appointment as Minister of War for the Islamic State of Iraq, Abu Suleiman warned Iraqi Shia Muslims that "dark days soaked with blood lie ahead". On 14 May 2010, an attacker targeting Shiites detonated explosives hidden inside a vehicle in Tal Afar at the entrance to a football stadium, killing ten people and injuring 120 others.

Iraqi security forces claimed to have killed Abu Suleiman during a raid on 24 February 2011, in the city of Hīt, west of Baghdad. A month later, ISI denied that al-Naser was killed. However, ISI spokesman Abu Muhammad al-Adnani later confirmed al-Naser's death in August 2011.

A report by Al Jazeera's Center for Studies, and an analysis of IS's leadership structure by a purported insider, also confirmed that Abu Suleiman had in fact been killed in February 2011, and that following his death, the position of "War Minister" was replaced by a military council composed of former regime military officers under the leadership of Haji Bakr.

Shortly after the Norway attacks on July 22, 2011, it was reported by Karen J. Greenberg, executive director of the Center on Law and Security at New York University School of Law, that al-Naser was the leader of a group named Ansar al-Jihad al-Alami ("Helpers of the Global Jihad"), a Kurdistan-based affiliate of Al-Qaeda. The group issued a statement claiming responsibility as a retaliation for Norway’s military involvement in Afghanistan and "unspecified insults to the Prophet Muhammad". The actual perpetrator of the attacks was later identified as Anders Behring Breivik, a Norwegian far-right extremist who was acted alone.
