= Turkmani =

Turkmani is a surname. Notable people with the surname include:

- Abu Muslim al-Turkmani (died 2015), Iraqi terrorist
- Hasan Turkmani (1935–2012), Syrian military commander
