= Manaf Abd al-Rahim al-Rawi =

Iraqi al-Qaeda member (1975–2013)

Manaf Abd al-Rahim al-Rawi مناف عبد الرحيم الراوي
- Born: October 4, 1975; Moscow, Russian SFSR, Soviet Union
- Died: April 1, 2013 (aged 37); Baghdad, Iraq
- Cause of death: Execution by hanging
- Known for: Terrorism

Manaf Abd al-Rahim al-Rawi (Arabic: مناف عبد الرحيم الراوي) (October 4, 1975 – April 1, 2013) was a senior Iraqi leader of Islamic State of Iraq (ISI), acting as its "governor" for Baghdad province.

Al-Rawi was arrested on March 11, 2010 by Iraqi security forces. Iraqi government sources claimed al-Rawi was responsible for planning multiple-vehicle bombings in Baghdad such as the August 2009 Baghdad bombings. Under interrogation, he reportedly gave authorities information which led to the killing of the group's top two leaders, Abu Ayyub al-Masri and Abu Omar al-Baghdadi, in April 2010. He was later convicted of terrorism and sentenced to death. Al-Rawi and three other ISI leaders were hanged in Baghdad on April 1, 2013.
