= Abu Muslim al-Turkmani =

ISIL deputy leader (died 2015)

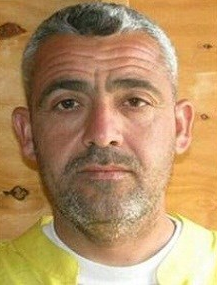
- Born: Fadel Ahmed Abdullah al-Hiyali c. 1959; Tal Afar, Nineveh Governorate, Iraq
- Died: August 18, 2015 (aged 55–56); Near Mosul, Iraq
- Military career
- Allegiance: Ba'athist Iraq (1980s–mid to late 1990s); Ansar al-Islam (mid to late 1990s–2003); Jama'at al-Tawhid wal-Jihad (2003–2004); Al-Qaeda (2004–2014); Al-Qaeda in Iraq (2004–2006); Islamic State of Iraq (2006–2013); Islamic State of Iraq and the Levant (2013–2014); Islamic State (2014–2015)
- Branch: Special Republican Guard (until mid to late 1990s); Military of ISIL (8 April 2013 – 18 August 2015)
- Rank: Lieutenant Colonel (up until mid to late 1990s); Deputy Leader of the Islamic State of Iraq and the Levant in Iraq (8 April 2013 – 18 August 2015)
- Conflicts: Gulf War; Iraq War; War in Iraq (2013–2017); War against the Islamic State; US-led intervention in Iraq (2014–2021) (KIA)

Fadel Ahmed Abdullah al-Hiyali (died 18 August 2015), better known by his noms de guerre Abu Muslim al-Turkmani (Arabic: أبو مسلم التركماني), Haji Mutazz, or Abu Mutaz al-Qurashi, was the Islamic State of Iraq and the Levant (ISIL) governor for territories held by the organization in Iraq. He was considered the ISIL second-in-command (along with his counterpart Abu Ali al-Anbari, who held a similar position in Syria); he played a political role of overseeing the local councils and a military role that included directing operations against opponents of ISIL. His names were also spelt Fadhil Ahmad al-Hayali, and Hajji Mutazz.

== Biography ==
An ethnic Turkmen born in Tal Afar, Nineveh Governorate, al-Hiyali was an Iraqi Army Colonel under Saddam Hussein. According to documents discovered in Iraq, al-Hiyali was a lieutenant colonel in the Iraqi military's intelligence unit Istikhbarat (Directorate of General Military Intelligence), who also spent time as a Special Forces officer in the Special Republican Guard right up until the US-led 2003 invasion of Iraq. He also fought in the Gulf War prior to his dismissal from the Iraqi Army after US forces arrived, and later joined Sunni insurgents to fight the Americans. He was later made the deputy leader of ISIL in Iraq on 8 April 2013. Like other ISIL leaders, al-Turkmani spent time in a US prison in Iraq, specifically Camp Bucca. During Ba'ath rule, he practiced a Sufi-leaning form of moderate Islam before being radicalised into Salafism.

However, according to an obituary for deputy leader Abu Ali al-Anbari published by ISIS after his death, al-Hiyali had actually been radicalized and recruited by al-Anbari who had been preaching Salafi jihadism in and around Tel Afar in the mid to late 1990s. The biography states that al-Hiyali had renounced his loyalty to Saddam Hussein and rejected Ba'athism and left the Iraqi army to join Abu Ali al-Anbari in pledging allegiance to Ansar al-Islam, providing important logistical aid and training to jihadist networks in northeastern Iraq. This would mean that al-Hiyali was a jihadist long before the US-led invasion of Iraq. This close association between Abu Ali al-Anbari and al-Hiyali would endure during their jihadist careers, with Abu Muslim eventually leaving Ansar al-Islam and joining Jama'at al-Tawhid wal-Jihad (which subsequently became Al-Qaeda in Iraq) around 2003 when Al-Qaduli (Abu Ali al-Anbari) did so after spending time with Zarqawi.

He oversaw ISIL-designated governors in various cities and regions of Iraq, including identified shadow governors in areas that ISIL did not control, but had aspirations over. "I describe Baghdadi as a shepherd, and his deputies are the dogs who herd the sheep (ISIL members); the strength of the shepherd comes from his dogs." said Hisham al-Hashimi, a security analyst who had access to documents discovered which provided details on al-Hiyali.

In a June 2015 article in The New York Times, al-Turkmani was said to have been the head of ISIL’s military council. He reportedly led the council of six to nine military commanders who directed the terrorist group's military strategy, according to Laith Alkhouri, a senior analyst at Flashpoint Global Partners.

Al-Hiyali, despite being a Turkmen, did nothing to stop the Iraqi Turkmen genocide in which even Sunni Turkmen were targeted. He also was at the forefront of the genocide against the Yezidi people including the enslavement of the women and girls, personally raping captives and executing prisoners despite pleas for mercy.

There were erroneous reports of his death in airstrikes on 7 November 2014 and again in December 2014. This was believed to have been due to a case of mistaken identity and his death was not confirmed by ISIL.

Al-Turkmani was killed by a US drone strike while travelling in a car near Mosul, Iraq on 18 August 2015. His death was confirmed by ISIL official spokesman and senior leader Abu Mohammad al-Adnani in an audio recording posted on jihadist websites in October 2015. He was succeeded as the ISIL leader in Iraq by Abu Fatima al-Jaheishi.
