= Abu Yaqub al-Masri =

Egyptian al-Qaeda member (died 2007)

- Born: Egypt
- Died: 31 August 2007; Tarmiya, Iraq
- Organization(s): Muslim Brotherhood; Egyptian Islamic Jihad; Al-Qaeda (Al-Qaeda in Iraq); Islamic State of Iraq

Abu Yaqub al-Masri, also known as Zakkariya (The Doctor) and labeled "The Emir of Taji", was a member of al-Qaeda who died on 31 August 2007. He was the organizer of the 23 November 2006 Sadr City bombings.

== History ==
He was thought to be a member of the Muslim Brotherhood and the Egyptian Islamic Jihad and al-Qaeda, and fought in Afghanistan. He was close to Ayman al-Zawahiri.

== Death ==
Masri was killed by Iraqi security forces near the city of Tarmiya, north of Baghdad.
