= August 2009 Baghdad bombings =

Terrorist attacks in Iraq

- Location: Baghdad, Iraq
- Date: 19 August 2009; 10:00 – (UTC+3)
- Target: Multiple
- Attack type: Car bombs and mortars
- Deaths: 101
- Injuries: 565+
- Perpetrator: Islamic State of Iraq (claimed)

The August 2009 Baghdad bombings were three coordinated car bomb attacks and a number of mortar strikes in the Iraqi capital, Baghdad, on 19 August 2009. The explosives were detonated simultaneously across the capital at approximately 10:45 in the morning, killing at least 101 people and wounding at least 565, making it the deadliest attack since the 14 August 2007 Yazidi communities bombings in northern Iraq which killed almost 800 people. The bombings targeted both government and privately owned buildings.

== Bombings ==
The windows were blown out and the doors were taken out, even the door frames went. If I had been in my room at the time I would have been seriously injured or worse. Everything is locked down now. Nobody can move anywhere, nobody is getting in or out. Even our security team cannot move.

— John Tipple, British citizen, referring to the bombing of the Rasheed Hotel.

The bombings occurred on the six-year anniversary of the bombing of the United Nations compound in Baghdad, which killed the UN's coordinator of the UN Assistance Mission in Iraq, Sérgio Vieira de Mello. The capture of two al-Qaeda members in a car intended to be used as another bomb led officials to believe they were part of a coordinated attack. The attack began in early mid-morning, when a truck bomb exploded outside the Finance Ministry. A larger explosion followed outside the Foreign Ministry, accompanied by mortar attacks on the secure Green Zone. The bombing shattered windows, killing those near them, and also brought down the compound wall across the street from the truck bomb. The Foreign Ministry explosion alone killed 58 people, and left a crater 3 metres (9.8 ft) deep and 10 metres (33 ft) wide. The next car bomb killed at least eight people and wounded at least 22 as it devastated a combined Iraqi Army-police patrol near the Finance Ministry. Two bombings in distant areas of the city, one in the commercial Baiyaa district killing two and wounding 16, the other in the Bab al-Muadham district killing six and wounding 24. One targeted the Rasheed Hotel, blowing out windows and door frames. Several mortars fell inside the Green Zone's perimeter, one near the UN compound, where aid workers were meeting to discuss the "growing danger" facing aid groups. The mortars were not confirmed by C-RAM IZ or any other US military.

In total, the attacks killed upwards of 90 people and injured upwards of 500. Prime Minister Nouri al-Maliki had been scheduled to deliver a speech at a nearby hotel, but this was canceled due to attacks.

=== Suspects and claim ===
Immediate suspicions fell on the Baathist alliance, al-Qaeda, and Sunni extremists. The attacks were claimed, at the end of October 2009, by Islamic State of Iraq, calling the targets "dens of infidelity".

A few days after the bombings, Iraq broadcast a video of former police chief Wissam Ali Kadhem Ibrahim, a Saddam Hussein loyalist, confessing to orchestrating a truck bombing at the finance ministry, the first of two bombings, and recalled its ambassador to Syria, after demanding that two Baathist suspects be handed over. Syria said it was not involved in the attacks, and subsequently recalled its ambassador to Iraq.

On 11 March 2010, Iraqi police arrested Munaf Abdul Rahim al-Rawi, the mastermind of the bombings. His capture also led to the death of al-Qaeda leaders Abu Ayub al-Masri and Abu Omar al-Baghdadi. Al-Rawi was called the "Governor of Baghdad" and masterminded many of the other Baghdad bombings since August 2009, according to Major General Qassim Atta, a Baghdad military spokesman.

== Reaction ==
The Kurdistan Regional Government condemned the attacks, blamed them on a "delay in security implementation" and called for unity among Iraqis.

== See also ==
- List of terrorist incidents in 2009
