= Ansar al-Jihad al-Alami =

Jihadist group

Ansar al-Jihad al-Alami (أنصار الجهاد العالمي, Anṣār al-Jihād al-‘Alāmī, "helpers of the global jihad") is a jihadist group that came to international attention in the immediate aftermath of the 2011 Norway attacks, when it was reported that the group had claimed responsibility for the attacks.

The group was described by Karen J. Greenberg, executive director of the Center on Law and Security at New York University School of Law as a Kurdistan-based affiliate of Al-Qaeda led by Abu Suleiman al-Naser.

== Prior to 2011 Norway attacks ==
The Middle East Observatory reported on 3 May 2011 that the organisation "sent an urgent message on jihadist forums, to all jihadists around the globe to mobilize and prepare to wage jihad operations against the Zionist-crusader alliance" after the death of Osama bin Laden. The individual who reportedly made this statement is Abu Suleiman al-Naser.

Another mention of the group includes a report published by the European Strategic Intelligence and Security Center (ESISC) in April 2011, in which it is noted that in early December 2010, "a previously unknown terrorist group, Ansar Al-Jihad Al-Alami, published a statement on several Jihadist website, in which it threatened to carry out attacks against Western interests in Morocco during the Christmas holidays."

== 2011 Norway attacks ==
On 22 July, in the hours following the 2011 Norway attacks, the group was said by Will McCants to have claimed responsibility for the attacks by means of a statement to the internet forum Shmukh that he says was eventually removed.

The New York Times reported that the group claimed responsibility for the attacks, citing a statement identified by a terrorism analyst that said they were a response to the presence of Norwegian forces in Afghanistan and "unspecified insults to the Prophet Muhammad." Giving its source as a report on Norway TV, The Wall Street Journal noted the statement from Ansar al-Jihad al-Alami said, "This is just the beginning of what will come"; while also noting that, "It's unclear that the group has taken responsibility." The Times said that Norwegian television reports indicated that Ansar al-Jihad al-Alami had denied involvement in the attacks.

On the same day of the attacks, police arrested and identified Anders Behring Breivik, a Norwegian with extreme-right views, as the shooter in Utøya and responsible for the Oslo bombings, and he was subsequently charged with terrorism. In his writings, Breivik suggests far-right militants should adopt Al-Qaeda's methods, learn from their success, and avoid their mistakes, and described Al-Qaeda as the "most successful revolutionary force in the world" and praised their "cult of martyrdom". According to his defender Geir Lippestad, Breivik has acknowledged that he is responsible for both the bomb and the shooting during interrogation. After his arrest Breivik claimed he acted with accomplices, but later changed his statements to him acting alone.

Will McCants said that someone identifying as Abu Sulayman al-Nasir who had posted the first claim of responsibility later made a further statement to Shmukh retracting it, stating that the attacker "must surely be known to all".
