= Abu Mohammad al-Adnani =

Former official spokesman for Islamic State (1977–2016)

Abu Muhammad al-Adnani
- أبو محمد العدناني
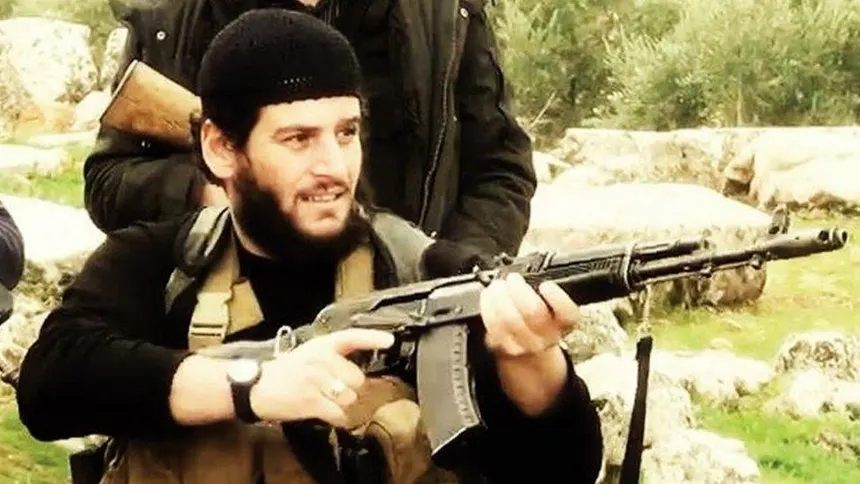
- Photo of Abu Muhammad al-'Adnani holding an AK-101.

Spokesman of the Islamic State
- Succeeded by: Abul-Hasan al-Muhajir

Personal details
- Born: Taha Subhi Falaha; 1977 Binnish, Idlib Governorate, Syria
- Died: 30 August 2016 (aged 38–39) Near al-Bab, Aleppo Governorate, Syria
- Cause of death: Air strike
- Children: Abu Mohammad al-Badri
- Criminal charge(s): Designated a terrorist by the United Nations Security Council and the US State Department

Military service
- Allegiance: Jama'at al-Tawhid wal-Jihad (2003–2004); al-Qaeda in Iraq (2004–2006); Islamic State of Iraq (2006–2013); Islamic State of Iraq and the Levant (2013–2014); Islamic State (2014–2016)

Taha Subhi Falaha (Note: Arabic: طٰهٰ صُبْحِيِّ فَلَاحَةٍ, romanized: Ṭāhā Ṣubḥī Falāḥa.) (1977 – 30 August 2016), commonly known by his nom de guerre Abu Muhammad al-Adnani al-Shami, (Note: Arabic: أَبُو مُحَمَّدٍ ٱلْعَدْنَانِيُّ ٱلشَّامِيُّ, romanized: ʾAbū Muḥammad al-ʿAdnānī ash-Shāmī, lit. 'Father of Muhammad, the Adnanite Levantine'.) was a Syrian-born militant leader who was the official spokesperson and a senior leader of the Islamic State. He was described as the chief of its external operations. He was the second most senior leader of the Islamic State after its leader Abu Bakr al-Baghdadi. Media reports in August 2016 suggested he was in charge of a special unit, known as the Emni, that was established by IS in 2014 with the double objective of internal policing and executing terrorist attacks outside IS territory.

On 5 May 2015, the U.S. State Department Rewards for Justice Program announced a reward up to US$5 million for information leading to his capture.

On 30 August 2016, the Islamic State announced al-Adnani had been killed in Aleppo Province. A number of fighting forces claimed responsibility for al-Adnani's death. On 12 September 2016, the U.S. Department of Defense announced that a U.S. coalition airstrike had killed al-Adnani, even though the Russian Federation had already claimed that Adnani had been killed in a Russian airstrike involving an Su-34 bomber.

== Early life ==
Al-Adnani was born in 1977 in the town of Binnish in the countryside of Idlib Governorate, northwestern Syria. According to a biography published by IS cleric Turki al-Binali after Adnani's death, he "grew up with the love of mosques ... [and] memorized the Quran as a young man."

== Al-Qā'ida in Iraq ==
According to a biography penned by Turki al-Binali, Adnani became involved in Islamic militancy in the year 2000 and was recruited by Abu Musab al-Zarqawi in 2002. His primary teacher was Abu Anas al-Shami, a senior leader in al-Zarqawi's Jama'at al-Tawhid wal Jihad. He swore allegiance to al-Zarqawi along with 35 others while in Syria, with a plan to fight the government of Bashar al-Assad. However, the Americans invaded Iraq, and Adnani became one of the first foreign fighters to oppose Coalition forces in Iraq.

He was summoned for questioning repeatedly by the Syrian General Intelligence Directorate and was arrested three times. One of these arrests occurred when he was passing through al-Bukamal on his way to Iraq for the first time. He spent months in jail and was finally freed after he refused to divulge information, despite being tortured. Al-Adnani, alongside Abu Hamza al-Muhajir, was one of the last to evacuate the city of Fallujah after the Second Battle of Fallujah in 2004.

=== May 2005 arrest ===
In May 2005 Al-Adnani was arrested by Coalition forces in Al Anbar Governorate in Iraq under a fake name "Yasser Khalaf Hussein Nazal al-Rawi", and was released in 2010 after serving time in Abu Ghraib prison. In December 2012, an Iraqi intelligence official said he was using a number of aliases including "Abu Mohamed al-Adnani, Taha al-Banshi, Jaber Taha Falah, Abu Baker al-Khatab and Abu Sadek al-Rawi."

== Islamic State ==
Al-Adnani was highly respected by his fellow fighters throughout his time in the Iraqi insurgency, with ISI leader Abu Omar al-Baghdadi saying about him, "It will be for this man the whole affair (of jihad)". Abu Musab al-Zarqawi trusted him so much that he allowed him to make executive decisions independently, saying "Do not consult me on matters, just brief me." He was also the teacher of Manaf Abd al-Rahim al-Rawi, the Islamic State of Iraq "governor" for Baghdad province. He was highly respected by Abu Bakr al-Baghdadi the leader of the Islamic State and he was considered by many sources to be second-in-command to Baghdadi.

According to Harry Sarfo, a former German member of the group. "The big man behind everything is Abu Muhammad al-Adnani. ... He is the head of the Emni, and he is the head of the special forces as well. ... Everything goes back to him."

On 18 August 2014, the US State Department listed al-Adnani as a Specially Designated Global Terrorist. On 15 August 2014, he was sanctioned by the United Nations Security Council.

According to a former IS militant and a former Yazidi slave, al-Adnani personally participated in the burning death of Jordanian pilot Muath al-Kasasbeh in 2015, and directed IS media crews to produce videos of killings.

On 4 January 2016, Abu Mohammad al-Adnani was reportedly injured by an Iraqi airstrike on Barwanah, near Haditha, Iraq and was moved to Mosul for recovery.

== Speeches ==
=== List of speeches ===
- "Now Now the Fighting Comes" (January 25, 2012)
- "Iraq, Iraq Oh Ahl al-Sunnah" (February 24, 2012)
- "The State of Islam Will Remain Safe" (March 4, 2012)
- "I Exhort You to One Thing Only" (May 21, 2012)
- "The Incursions Are Deadlier" (November 1, 2012)
- "The Seven Facts" (January 30, 2013)
- "So Fight Them, Verily They Are Polytheists" (June 15, 2013)
- "Ignore Them and Their False Allegations" (June 20, 2013)
- "They Will Not Harm You Except For [Some] Annoyance" (July 30, 2013)
- "Peaceful Is Whose Religion?" (30 August 2013)
- "May God Be With You, Oh the Oppressed State" (30 September 2013)
- "The Scout Doesn't Lie To His People" (January 7, 2014)
- "Then We Pray For God's Curse to Be On the Liars" (March 7, 2014)
- "He Will Surely Establish For Them [Therein] Their Religion Which He Has Preferred For Them" (April 3, 2014)
- "This is Not Our Manhaj, Nor Will It Ever Be" (April 17, 2014)
- "Apologies, Emir of Al-Qaeda" (May 11, 2014)
- "What Comes to You of Good Is From Allah" (June 12, 2014)
- "This Is the Promise of Allah" (June 29, 2014)
- "Indeed, Your Lord Is Ever Watchful" (22 September 2014)
- "Say Die in Your Rage" (26 January 2015)
- "So They Kill and Are Killed" (12 March 2015)
- "O Our People Respond to the Caller of Allah" (23 June 2015)
- "Say to Those Who Disbelieve You Will Be Overcome" (October 15, 2015)
- "And Those Who Lived [In Faith] Would Live Upon Evidence" (21 May 2016)

As spokesman of the Islamic State, Adnani made a considerable number of speeches. His rhetorical style received attention. Abu al-Waleed al-Salafi, a researcher, comments, "I have analysed the speeches of Baghdadi and Adnani psychologically more than once, and I found a result: that Adnani's speech seeks to inspire zeal in the soul, while Baghdadi's speech seeks to inspire calm." Adnani's vitriolic speaking style established his reputation as the 'attack dog' of the Islamic State, especially for his denunciations of al-Qaeda and commands to commit terrorist attacks in Western countries.

=== 'Indeed, Your Lord Is Ever Watchful' speech ===
On 22 September 2014, al-Adnani gave a lengthy speech entitled "Indeed, Your Lord Is Ever Watchful", which was significant because it was the first official instruction by the Islamic State for its supporters to kill non-Muslims in Western countries. This speech has been credited with inspiring a wave of Islamic terrorism in Europe.

Among other things, Al-Adnani said:

If you can kill a disbelieving American or European - especially the spiteful and filthy French - or an Australian, or a Canadian, or any other disbeliever from the disbelievers waging war, including the citizens of the countries that entered into a coalition against the Islamic State, then rely upon Allah, and kill him in any manner or way however it may be.

and later on:

If you are not able to find an IED or a bullet, then single out the disbelieving American, Frenchman, or any of their allies. Smash his head with a rock, or slaughter him with a knife, or run him over with your car, or throw him down from a high place, or choke him, or poison him.

== Death ==
On 30 August 2016, the Islamic State announced that Adnani had been killed in Aleppo Governorate while inspecting the frontlines near al-Bab. The Russian Federation claimed that Adnani had been killed in a Tuesday (30 August 2016) Russian airstrike. Specifically, the Russian Defense Ministry indicated on August 31 that al-Adnani was killed in the Maarat Umm Hawsh area of Aleppo as the result of an airstrike conducted by a Russian Su-34 bomber, a strike which targeted and hit a group of about 40 Islamic State fighters.

An unnamed U.S. defense official said, "coalition forces conducted an airstrike in al-Bab, Syria, targeting an ISIL senior leader" and were still trying to confirm whether he was killed. A U.S. defense official called the Russian claim to have killed al-Adnani "preposterous" and "a joke" and said they stand by the statement made on August 30 that U.S. forces conducted the strike that targeted al-Adnani. Also, earlier in the day on 30 August 2016, a U.S. military intelligence official stated that al-Adnani was wounded several days previous and succumbed to his injuries in al-Bab.

The U.S. Department of Defense confirmed on 12 September that al-Adnani had been killed in an airstrike on 30 August near al-Bab.

After his death al-Adnani was featured on the cover of the first issue of IS propaganda magazine Rumiyah, which praised both his life as a jihadist and his 'martyrdom'. It repeatedly stated that the killing of al-Adnani will only strengthen the organization as there are many who will follow his path and replace him.

== Books ==
He wrote a number of books, including The Context of Jihad and Its Related Issues and Verses on the Jurisprudence of Jihad, that he penned while being imprisoned by the Americans. Many of his publications eventually served as textbooks for Islamic State fighters in training camps, where he also used to teach the Arabic language and its grammar, as well as Islamic law.
