= Emni =

Branch of the Islamic State (IS)

Emni, also known as Amn al-Kharji, is a multi-purpose branch of the Islamic State (IS), a Jihadist Islamist militant group that controlled a large amount of the Middle East in the 2010s. It serves as IS's internal police force, foreign operations unit, and intelligence and security branch, while also making propaganda. It started out as an internal police force in 2013, and expanded to help and protect IS's territorial growth, as well as to recruit people worldwide to perform terrorist attacks outside of their territory. Emni was involved in the 2015 Bardo National Museum attack, 2015 Sousse attacks, 2015 Paris attacks, 2016 Brussels bombings, and the July 2016 Dhaka attack.

== Operations ==
The Islamic State controlled a large amount of Iraq and Syria from 2013 to 2017. It has continued operating despite the loss of territory. Emni, a multilevel network, started out as the internal police force of IS, but gained other uses. In the foreign operations unit, they recruit people worldwide, physically and virtually, to commit terrorist attacks abroad for IS. Generally, they process the recruits in IS's territory, and then export them abroad, having them wait for commands to perform terrorist attacks in their new location. Emni also uses counterintelligence to find moles within IS; one method is by recording conversations between IS members, which the members are aware of. Some civilians in IS's territory have also worked for Emni as informants, joining for economic reasons.

There is a rigorous vetting process for each terrorist recruit that joins; this includes only letting people in who have never fought for any group other than IS. When processed in IS's territory, they undergo extensive physical training. The recruits are then put into small groups based on their spoken languages and sent abroad; they might only see the members of their group "on the eve of their departure abroad". In the European operation, new recruits are used as "clean men" who pass on information between those planning to attack. As of 2016, there were hundreds of members stationed in Europe, including hundreds in Turkey.

A 2016 New York Times report showed that terrorist recruitment efforts had at least happened in Austria, Bangladesh, Germany, Indonesia, Lebanon, Malaysia, Spain, and Tunisia. Much of the efforts were focused in Central Asian countries, specifically targeting "poor and underdeveloped regions based in areas with large bazaars". Emni has recruited people from North America to join the foreign operations unit, but the unit as of 2016 has not sent a trained recruit back to North America. Emni instead operates with U.S. members exclusively over social media, because they believe "the Americans are dumb — they have open gun policies" [...] "we can radicalize them easily, and if they have no prior record, they can buy guns, so we don't need to have no contact man who has to provide guns for them."

== History ==
The leader of Emni before 2016 was Abu Muhammad al-Adnani, who worked as IS' spokesman and chief of propaganda. He was the second highest-in-command leader of IS. He had met the caliph of IS, Abu Bakr al-Baghdadi, while they were both imprisoned at the Camp Bucca U.S. detention facility in the late 2000s.

Emni first exported terrorists abroad in 2014. Al-Adnani first publicly called for IS' sympathizers to perform terrorist attacks in the west in September 2014, and made another public appeal in May 2016. The town of Manbij in northern Syria was used a processing center for foreign recruits. Recruits only met al-Adnani after "10 levels of training", and would pledge allegiance to him blindfolded; this made it so even the organizations' top fighters did not know his identity. The level below al-Adnani were made of lieutenants that were assigned a specific region of the world to perform terrorism within, with titles such as "secret service for European affairs". Two of the top lieutenants went by the pseudonyms of "Abu Souleymane al-Faransi" and "Abu Ahmad"; they were French and Syrian respectively.

Emni carried out the 2015 Bardo National Museum attack, 2015 Sousse attacks, and 2015 Paris attacks, and made the suitcase bombs used in the 2016 Brussels bombings. "Abu Souleymane al-Faransi" had a potential role in the Paris attacks; during the hostage kidnapping and standoff inside the Bataclan theatre, hostage David Fritz Goeppinger heard a bomber ask another in French, "Should we call Souleymane?"; the other member was annoyed that they were speaking in French and asked them to switch to Arabic. Another key member of Emni was Abdelhamid Abaaoud, the on-ground commander of the Paris attacks who was killed by Parisian police days after the attack. Multiple terrorist incidents occurred in many different locations after the May 2016 call to violence. Afterwards, Emni committed the July 2016 Dhaka attack.

France and Germany received intelligence on Emni after multiple arrests in 2014 and 2015. The U.S. received intelligence on the organization from USB drives left behind in Manbij after the city's 2016 liberation, as well from the interrogation of Mohamad Jamal Khweis, a non-member American from Virginia who travelled to Syria to meet Emni members before being captured by Kurdish troops in March 2016. Abu Muhammad al-Adnani was killed in Syria in August 2016, but Emni continued operating. As of 2019, Emni was still active.
