= Abu Fatima al-Jaheishi =

ISIS leader

Abu Fatima al-Jaheishi أبو فاطمة الجحيشي
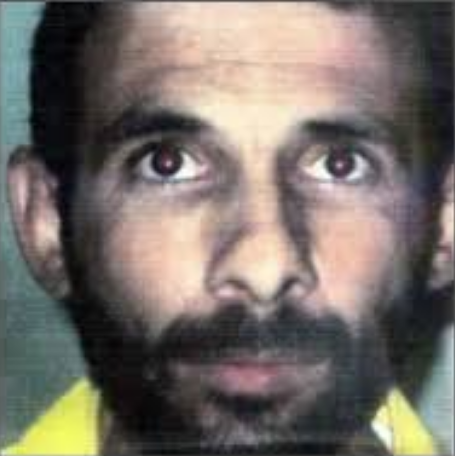
- Abu Fatima in detention
- Born: Ni'ma Abd Nayef al-Jabouri نعمة عبد نايف الجبوري; 23 October 1980; Tal Afar, Iraq
- Died: 18 February 2017 (aged 36); Mosul, Iraq
- Military career
- Allegiance: Islamic State
- Rank: Deputy leader of the Islamic State in Iraq
- Conflicts: Iraqi insurgency War in Iraq

Ni'ma Abd Nayef al-Jabouri (Arabic: نعمة عبد نايف الجبوري), known by his nom de guerre Abu Fatima al-Jaheishi (Arabic: أبو فاطمة الجحيشي) or Abu Fatima al-Jiburi, was initially in charge of the IS operations in southern Iraq before he moved to the northern city of Kirkuk. He then became Governor of the South and Central Euphrates region in the Islamic State and a senior member in the IS hierarchy.

The available information indicates that as of 2016, Abu Fatima was alive and part of the inner circle of Islamic State leader then-leader Abu Bakr al-Baghdadi, was serving as his deputy in the position of the overall leader for Iraq. He succeeded Abu Muslim al-Turkmani, who was killed by a US drone strike near Mosul on 18 August 2015. He was reported to have been killed later that year in Mosul, possibly during the Mosul Offensive launched around the same time.
