= Islamic State of Iraq =

Salafi jihadist militant organization in Iraq (2006–2013)

- دَوْلَة الْعِرَاق الإِسْلَامِيَّة; Dawlat al-ʿIrāq al-ʾIslāmiyyah
- Flag
- Leaders: Abu Omar al-Baghdadi † (2006–2010) Leader; Abu Ayyub al-Masri † (2006–2010) War Minister and Prime Minister; Abu Bakr al-Baghdadi (2010–2013)
- Dates active: 15 October 2006 – 8 April 2013
- Merger of: Mujahideen Shura Council; Al-Qaeda in Iraq; Jama'at Jaish Ahl al-Sunnah wal-Jama`ah; Jaish al-Ta'ifa al-Mansurah
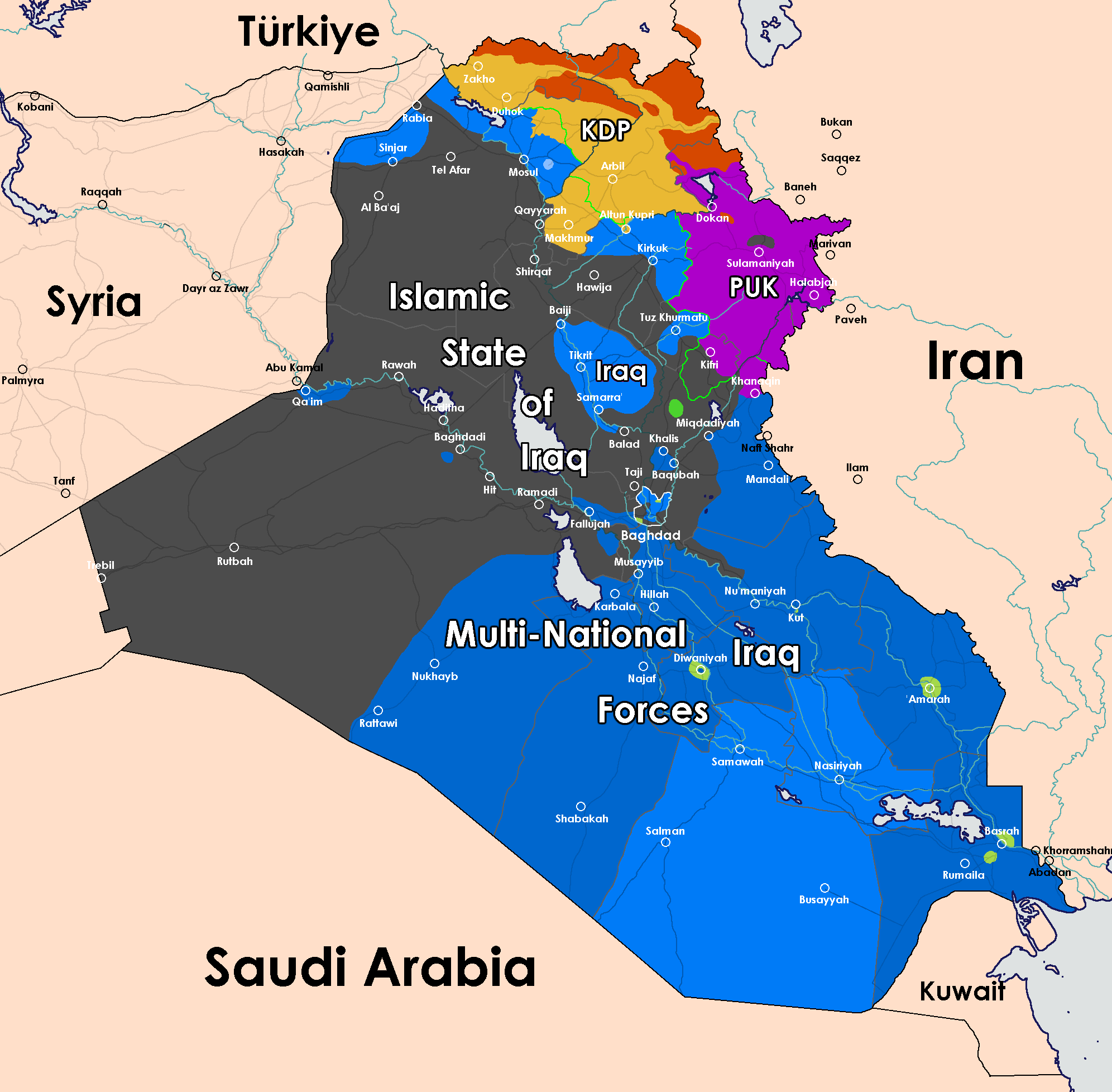
- Active regions: Map of the territory of the Islamic State of Iraq (dark grey) at its greatest territorial extent on 20 October 2006.
- Ideology: Salafism: Salafist jihadism; Wahhabism; Qutbism; Anti-Shi'ism; Salafi jihadism
- Part of: Al-Qaeda (until 2013)
- Wars: the Iraq War, the Iraqi insurgency, the Syrian Civil War, and the Global War on Terrorism

The Islamic State of Iraq (ISI; Arabic: دَوْلَة الْعِرَاق الإِسْلَامِيَّة Dawlat al-ʿIrāq al-ʾIslāmiyyah) was a Salafi jihadist militant organization that fought the forces of the U.S.-led coalition during the Iraqi insurgency. The organization aimed to overthrow the Iraqi federal government and establish an Islamic state governed by Sharia law in Iraq.

Islamic State of Iraq traces its origins to Jama'at al-Tawhid wal-Jihad (JTJ) group, which was formed by the Jordanian national Abu Musab al-Zarqawi in Jordan in 1999. Al-Zarqawi led the group, until his death in June 2006. JTJ fought the American occupation forces during the early Iraqi insurgency following the 2003 invasion of Iraq, and on 17 October 2004 al-Zarqawi pledged allegiance to Osama bin Laden and the group became known as "Tanzim Qaidat al-Jihad fi Bilad al-Rafidayn" (commonly known as Al-Qaeda in Iraq). In January 2006, AQI and seven other Sunni guerrilla groups formed the Mujahideen Shura Council (MSC), which on 15 October 2006 disbanded to form the "Islamic State of Iraq" organization, led by Abu Omar al-Baghdadi as its first Emir. Announcing the dissolution of both AQI and the MSC, al-Baghdadi declared that the previous organizations have been replaced by ISI.

Within weeks, former AQI leader Abu Hamza al-Muhajir pledged allegiance to Abu Omar al-Baghdadi and became ISI's war minister, thereby transferring control of around 22,000 AQI fighters and volunteers to ISI. At its height during 2006–2008, ISI declared the city of Baqubah as its capital and governed territories in its strongholds of Mosul, Al-Anbar, as well as in the regions of Baghdad and Diyala. In areas under its control, ISI implemented a strict version of Sharia law. The organization also maintained a formidable military force. The area under its control began diminishing following the American troop surge in 2007, during which dozens of ISI leaders were killed by the forces of the U.S.-led coalition. Although unaffiliated with the al-Qaeda network, the ISI was often labeled by U.S. military forces as "al-Qaeda in Iraq" until 2013.

ISI Emir Abu Omar al-Baghdadi and Minister of War Abu Hamza al-Muhajir were killed during a military operation by U.S.-led coalition forces on a safehouse on 18 April 2010. Abu Bakr al-Baghdadi became the Emir of ISI after the death of Abu Omar al-Baghdadi. On 8 April 2013, Abu Bakr al-Baghdadi re-designated ISI as the "Islamic State of Iraq and the Levant" (ISIL), officially announcing the group's formal expansion into Syria and its intention to absorb the Al-Nusra Front thereby taking direct command over its fighters and territory. Al-Qaeda Emir Ayman al-Zawahiri strongly denounced the announcement and officially demanded the withdrawal of ISI from Syria ordering them to operate only within Iraq. Abu Bakr al-Baghdadi responded to al-Zawahiri by saying that the group's expansion into Syria as well as the absorption of the al-Nusra Front will continue to go ahead despite his orders. The ensuing events ignited a full-scale global conflict between ISIL and Al-Qaeda. After ISIL's rapid territorial expansion during its June 2014 Northern Iraq offensive, the group renamed itself as "ad-Dawlah al-Islāmiyah" (lit. 'Islamic State') and proclaimed itself to be a caliphate.

== Background ==
Jordanian militant Abu Musab al-Zarqawi founded a group called Jama'at al-Tawhid wal-Jihad (Group of Monotheism and Jihad) in 1999, aiming to overthrow the 'apostate' Kingdom of Jordan. Although they are believed to have assassinated US diplomat Laurence Foley in 2002, they became notorious for their violent campaign in Iraq, which began in August 2003, following the US invasion of Iraq (April 2003).

In October 2004, al-Zarqawi pledged allegiance to Osama bin Laden and changed the name of his group to Tanzim Qaidat al-Jihad fi Bilad al-Rafidayn (Organization of Jihad's Base in Mesopotamia), often referred to as Al-Qaeda in Iraq (AQI), which indulged in dozens of violent attacks per year in Iraq.

In January 2006, AQI joined seven Sunni Islamist groups to form the coalition of Mujahideen Shura Council (MSC) and continued its attacks in Iraq. In June 2006, al-Zarqawi was killed by a United States airstrike, and the Egyptian Abu Ayyub al-Masri became the leader of AQI. Abu Omar al-Baghdadi, who led the Jaish al-Ta'ifa al-Mansurah group, became the new leader of Mujahideen Shura Council (MSC).

== General characteristics ==
=== Formation ===
On 13 and 15 October 2006, messages on the Internet issued by the Mujahideen Shura Council (MSC) officially declared the establishment of the Islamic State of Iraq (ISI), which should encompass the governorates of Baghdad, Anbar, Diyala, Kirkuk, Saladin, Niniveh and parts of Babil and Wasit – a swathe of central and western Iraq where most Sunni Arabs live.

In its founding declaration, the ISI spokesperson asserted that the organization was inspired by the archetype of the Islamic state established by Muhammad in Medina. Urging all Muslims in Iraq to give bay'ah to Abu Omar al-Baghdadi, the declaration stated:

“And today we call on all Iraqi mujahideen, scholars and tribal sheikhs. And the general Sunnis; To pledge allegiance to the Commander of the Faithful, the honorable Sheikh Abu Omar al-Baghdadi, to listen and obey in times of action or hatred, and to work hard to strengthen the foundations of this state and to sacrifice life and treasure for it.”

=== Goals ===
Between 2003 and 2004, targets of the "Jama'at al-Tawhid wal-Jihad" group had included the assets of the US-led Multi-National Force in Iraq and the U.S.-installed Iraqi provisional government. After pledging allegiance to al-Qaeda in 2004, the group became a major insurgent faction that fought the forces of American occupation. Until its dissolution is October 2006, the goals of Al-Qaeda in Iraq, as well as its allies in the Mujahideen Shura Council, included: expelling the US from Iraq, establishing an Islamic state in Iraq, and extending this program to neighboring countries. The objectives of its predecessor organization were also the core goals of the Islamic State of Iraq organization.

ISI also aspired to declare itself as a Caliphate at some point in the future. After the establishment of ISI, the organization's first Emir Abu Omar al-Baghdadi stated in 2006:

"[We have] reached the end of a stage of jihad and the start of a new one, in which we lay the first cornerstone of the Islamic Caliphate project and revive the glory of our religion."

A document explaining the mission, core principles and methodology of ISI published in 2006, described the organization as “the new Islamic state”, which emerged to wage Jihad against the forces of the "Crusader invasion" and establish Islamic governance in the region.

=== Leadership ===
When ISI was formed in October 2006, Abu Omar al-Baghdadi was declared as the organization's Emir. The US government initially viewed Abu Omar al-Baghdadi as a fictitious persona, invented to put an Iraqi face on the leadership of ISI which the US saw as a front organization of the global Al-Qaeda network. However, US military officials later came to believe that the Baghdadi 'role' had been taken by an actual ISI leader.

Abu Ayyub al-Masri (an Egyptian also known as Abu Hamza al-Muhajir), was the leader of Al-Qaeda in Iraq from June 2006 until its dissolution in October 2006. Weeks after the formation of ISI, Abu Hamza al-Muhajir gave bay'ah to Abu Omar al-Baghdadi and declared that AQI had ceased to exist, being entirely supplanted by the ISI. Al-Qaeda's central command acknowledged Abu Ayyub al-Masri's pledge of allegiance to al-Baghdadi, and Ayman al-Zawihiri confirmed in a 2007 interview that Al-Qaeda's Iraq branch no longer existed after its absorption by the ISI organization. Officially, Abu Hamza al-Mujahir was the Islamic State of Iraq's military commander, and from April 2007 its Minister of War.

Al-Masri and Omar al-Baghdadi were both reported killed on 18 April 2010 in a raid by Iraqi and US forces. On 16 May 2010, Abu Bakr al-Baghdadi was announced as the new leader of the Islamic State of Iraq; his deputy was Abu Abdallah al-Husseini al-Qurashi. On 14 May 2010, al-Masri was succeeded by Abu Suleiman al-Naser, who was in turn killed some time in 2011. Following Suleiman's death, the position of "War Minister" was replaced by a Military Council composed of former military officers of Ba'athist Iraq, under the leadership of Haji Bakr.

==== 'Cabinet' ====
In April 2007, the ISI declared a 'cabinet' of ten 'ministers', under its leader Abu Omar al-Baghdadi. The 'ministers' included:

- Abdullah al-Janabi, Minister of Security, was already wanted by the Iraqi Criminal Court since 2005. In 2014 he was still a prominent militant in Fallujah.
- Abu Ayyub al-Masri, Minister of War, was already wanted by Iraqi and US-coalition authorities since 2005, and was killed by US/Iraqi forces in April 2010. He was succeeded by Abu Suleiman al-Naser.

Abu Bakr al-Baghdadi, who in May 2010 would become the new leader of ISI, was before April 2010 the general supervisor of ISI's provincial sharia committees and a member of its senior consultative council.

=== Funding and financing ===
According to American authorities, the group lost considerable funding sources and popular support from 2007 onwards. A 2008 report on the group's funding reported that its most lucrative source of income was stolen oil in the region of Bayji (between Baghdad and Mosul), which yielded them $2 million a month. Other sources of income were kidnappings of wealthy Iraqi people for ransom, car theft, robbery, hijacking fuel trucks, counterfeiting, commandeering rations and shaking down Iraqi soldiers for ammunition, these activities brought in tens of millions of dollars. In addition, jihadists in Saudi Arabia and Syria and other elements outside Iraq provided funding.

Between 2005 and 2010, according to an analysis by RAND Corporation of 200 documents—personal letters, expense reports and membership rosters—captured by US Forces between 2005 and 2010, 95% of the group's budget was raised in Iraq, from the oil business, kidnappings, extortion, cash of members from Mosul, etc. Only 5% of the budget came from outside donations.

=== Structure ===
In 2006, Iraqis effectively ran Al Qaeda in Iraq (AQI) in positions like internal security and battalion commanders, with foreign fighters' often relegated to suicide attackers, however the upper tiers of the organization were still dominated by non-Iraqis. AQI was a well-oiled and bureaucratic organisation with a high degree of documentation of its activities, from records of payments to its members, lists of opponents to be killed, and verdicts and sentences given to its prisoners. In 2007, Ayman al-Zawahiri declared that the structure of AQI was absorbed into the ISI organization and asserted that Al-Qaeda no longer had a branch in Iraq.

In 2008, Islamic State of Iraq appeared to have at least 80 execution videos, mostly beheadings, lying on the shelf that had never been distributed or released on the Internet: a former AQI commander told CNN that they were used to verify the deaths to their superiors and to justify continued funding and support. During an online Q&A session conducted in 2009, al-Zawahiri confirmed that the Islamic State of Iraq organization operated independently of Al-Qaeda and was working towards the establishment of a Caliphate. Asserting that the former AQ members in Iraq are under the command of ISI, al-Zawahiri stated:

“The State [i.e., ISI] is a step on the path to establishing the caliphate. It is superior to mujahid groups. These organizations [in Iraq] must give allegiance to the State, not vice versa. The Commander of the Faithful, Abu Omar al-Baghdadi - may God protect him - is one of the leaders of the Muslims and the mujahideen in this era.”

By the end of 2009, ISI was, according to US and Iraqi officials, a mostly Iraqi network of small, roving cells, still relying on fighters and weapons smuggled through the Syrian border.

=== Strength ===
During 2004–2006, ISI's predecessor organization, Al Qaeda in Iraq (AQI), steadily rose in popularity in Western Iraq. By August 2006, AQI had emerged the dominant power in Anbar region and a U.S. military report described Al-Qaeda as an "integral part of the social fabric of western Iraq". A 2006 report from U.S. State Department's Bureau of Intelligence and Research estimated that the number of core fighters of AQI exceeded one thousand. This estimate excluded the fighters of other Al-Qaeda allied organizations in the Mujahideen Shura Council (MSC). American military analyst Malcolm Nance estimated that AQI's strength ranged from 850 to several thousand full-time fighters.

In November 2006, former AQI Emir Abu Hamza al-Muhajir gave bay'ah to Abu Omar al-Baghdadi. Subsequently, the Islamic State of Iraq (ISI) organization gained command of an estimated 12,000 AQI fighters and an additional 10,000 al-Qaeda recruits. After the withdrawal of U.S. troops from Iraq in late 2011, U.S. estimates of ISI's strength ranged from 1,000 to 2,500 fighters.

== History ==
=== 2006–2008 military presence or control ===
The Washington Post reported that AQI and its successor organization Islamic State of Iraq came to control large parts of Iraq between 2005 and 2008. In autumn 2006, AQI had taken over Baqubah, the capital of Diyala Governorate, and by March 2007 ISI had claimed Baqubah as its capital. In 2006, AQI/ISI had strongholds in Al Anbar Governorate, from Fallujah to Qaim, and were the dominant power there, according to the US. In 2007, ISI had military units in Baghdad Governorate, and in 2007–2008, ISI had strongholds in Mosul in Ninawa Governorate.

Between July and October 2007, AQI/ISI lost military bases in Anbar province and the Baghdad area and between April 2007 and April 2009, it lost considerable support, mobility and financial backing.

=== 2006–2007 attacks claimed by or attributed to ISI ===
The 23 November 2006 Sadr City bombings, killing 215 people, were blamed by the US on Islamic State of Iraq (ISI).

In February and on 16 and 27 March 2007, lethal attacks on Sunni Iraqi targets took place that were not claimed, but that either Western observers or Iraqi rivals blamed on ISI (see section 2007 conflicts with Sunni and nationalist Iraqi groups).

The 23 March 2007 assassination attempt on Sunni Deputy Prime Minister of Iraq Salam al-Zaubai was claimed by ISI: "We tell the traitors of al-Maliki's infidel government, wait for what will destroy you".

The 12 April 2007 Iraqi Parliament bombing was reportedly also claimed by ISI.

In May 2007, Islamic State of Iraq claimed responsibility for an attack on a US military post that cost the live of seven Americans.

The 25 June 2007 suicide bombing of a meeting of Al Anbar tribal leaders and officials at Mansour Hotel, Baghdad, killing 13 people, including six Sunni sheikhs and other prominent figures, was claimed by ISI who in a statement on the Internet said this attack was revenge for the rape of a girl by "members of the apostate police force at Anbar".

For the August 2007 Yazidi communities bombings, which killed some 800 people, US military and government sources named al-Qaeda in Iraq (Islamic State of Iraq) as the "prime suspect", but there was no claim of responsibility for those attacks.

On 13 September 2007, ISI killed Sunni sheikh Abdul Sattar Abu Risha, and on 25 September, another lethal attack on Sunni as well as Shiite leaders was blamed on ISI (for both, see section 2007 conflicts with Sunni and nationalist Iraqi groups).

=== ISI expelling Christians ===
In 2004, Sunni militants bombed churches and kidnapped Christians in the Baghdad district of Dora. The US military briefly 'cleared' Dora in autumn 2006, but militants tied to Al Qaeda in Iraq reestablished themselves in Dora in late 2006 and began harassing Christians. By January 2007, ISI proclamations appeared on walls in Dora and leaflets were circulated: women should wear veils; shorts and cellphones were prohibited. Christians were given the choice: either pay a tax, or become a Muslim, or leave the district. By May 2007, 500 Christian families had left Dora. ISI also targeted Christians in the 2010 Baghdad church massacre.
For continued persecution of (Christian) Assyrians in 2014 by ISIL, see: Persecution of Assyrians by ISIL.

=== Threatening Iran ===
In July 2007, ISI's leader Abu Omar al-Baghdadi threatened Iran with war: "We are giving the Majus, and especially the rulers of Iran, a two-month period to end all kinds of support for the Iraqi Shia government and to stop direct and indirect intervention ... otherwise a severe war is waiting for you." He also warned Arab states against doing business with Iran.

=== 2007 conflicts with Sunni and nationalist Iraqi groups ===
By the beginning of 2007, Sunni tribes and nationalist insurgents were battling with AQI over control of Sunni communities, and some Sunni groups agreed to fight the group in exchange for American arms, ammunition, cash, pick-up trucks, fuel and supplies.

In February 2007, a truck bomb exploded near a mosque near Fallujah where the imam had criticised ISI, killing 35 people, the BBC suggested this attack may have been a retaliation from ISI.

On 16 March 2007, three attacks near Fallujah and Ramadi (50 km west of Fallujah) killed eight people: a BBC correspondent assumed two of those attacks to have been targeting tribal leaders who had spoken out against ISI.

On 27 March 2007, the leader of Sunni Arab insurgent group 1920 Revolution Brigades was killed. An official of the group blamed ISI for the attack. The 1920 Revolution Brigades had been rumored to have taken part in secret talks with American and Iraqi officials who tried to draw Sunni groups away from AQI.

Around 10 April 2007, a spokesman of Islamic Army in Iraq (IAI), a significant Sunni Arab insurgent group fighting Iraqi and US forces, accused ISI of killing 30 members of his group, and also members of the Army of the Mujahideen and the Ansar Al-Sunna resistance group, and called on ISI to review its behaviour: "Killing Sunnis has become a legitimate target for them, especially rich ones. Either they pay them what they want or they kill them", their statement said; "They would kill any critic or whoever tries to show them their mistakes. Assaulting people's homes became permitted and calling people infidels became popular". In a 42-minute audiotape released on 17 April, Abu Omar al-Baghdadi responded: "To my sons of the Islamic Army (...) We swear to you we don't shed the protected blood of Muslims intentionally", and, calling for unity: "One group is essential to accomplish victory".

The first week of June 2007, ISI fighters exchanged heavy fire with Sunni insurgents, including IAI members, in several Baghdad neighborhoods. On 6 June 2007, the Islamic Army in Iraq "reached an agreement with al-Qaeda in Iraq, leading to an immediate cessation of all military operations between the two sides", according to an IAI statement. An IAI commander explained to Time: IAI and ISI still disagree on some things, but "the most important thing is that it's our common duty to fight the Americans".

ISI on 14 September 2007 claimed responsibility for the killing of Sunni sheikh Abdul Sattar Abu Risha, leader of the Anbar Salvation Council, who had cooperated with the US to push the group out of Anbar Province, and vowed to assassinate other tribal leaders who cooperate with US and Iraqi government forces.

On 23 September 2007, ISI in a statement accused Hamas of Iraq and the 1920 Revolution Brigades of killing its fighters. On 25 September, a bomb in a Shiite mosque in the city of Baqubah, during a meeting between tribal, police and guerrilla leaders, killed leaders of Hamas of Iraq and the 1920 Revolution Brigades and others: local reports said the attack was the work of ISI.

=== US' rhetorical focusing on "Al-Qaeda (in Iraq)" ===
During 2007, US authorities and President George W. Bush strongly emphasized the role of "Al-Qaeda (in Iraq)" in violence, insurgency and attacks on US troops, and the threat of them acquiring 'real power' in Iraq. While some 30 groups claimed responsibility for attacks on US troops and Iraqi government targets in an examined period in May 2007, US military authorities mentioned the name "Al-Qaeda (in Iraq)" 51 times against only five mentions of other groups. Observers and scholars (like US Middle East specialist Steven Simon, US terrorism analyst Lydia Khalil, and Anthony H. Cordesman of the US Center for Strategic and International Studies) asserted that the role played by 'AQI' was being unduly stressed.

In March 2007, the US-sponsored Radio Free Europe/Radio Liberty analyzed attacks in Iraq in that month and concluded that ISI had taken credit for 43 out of 439 attacks on Iraqi security forces and Shia militias, and 17 out of 357 attacks on US troops. According to National Intelligence Estimate and Defense Intelligence Agency reports in July 2007, AQI accounted for 15% of the attacks in Iraq. The Congressional Research Service noted in its September 2007 report that attacks from Al-Qaeda were less than 2% of the violence in Iraq. It criticized the Bush administration's statistics, noting that its false reporting of insurgency attacks as 'AQI attacks' had increased since the surge operations began in 2007. At a press conference on 29 December 2007, US General David Petraeus again said that "the vast majority" of attacks in Iraq are still carried out by ISI.

Despite claims made by the Obama Administration that Al Qaeda in Iraq was still active in 2013, AQI had been dissolved sometime after ISI was established in October 2006 when Abu Musab al-Zarqawi's successor Abu Hamza al-Muhajir swore allegiance to the ISI leadership. The independence of ISI from Al-Qaeda Central was also affirmed by Ayman al-Zawahiri when, during a 2007 interview, he stated that Al-Qaeda no longer operated in Iraq and that it had been incorporated into the ISI.

American analyst Cole Bunzel rejected the US military's characterization of ISI being loyal to Al-Qaeda's central leadership as "misleading". According to Bunzel the Bin Laden Papers "indicate that AQC never approved of the Islamic State's establishment and that a leadership-to-leadership relationship hardly ever existed."

=== 2007 US arming militias against ISI ===
Starting early in 2007 in Anbar Province, according to American commanders and officials, insurgent groups in several Iraqi provinces that had grown disillusioned with ISI tactics like suicide bombings against Iraqi civilians, agreed to fight Islamic State of Iraq in exchange for American arms, ammunition, cash, pick-up trucks, fuel and supplies, and in some cases had agreed to alert American troops on locations of roadside bombs and booby traps. This practice of negotiating arms deals with "Sunni insurgents" was approved of by the US high command in June 2007.

By December 2007, the so-called "Awakening movement", an Arab tribal force in the Anbar region paid by the American military to fight ISI, had grown to 65,000–80,000 fighters. The Iraqi government and some Shiites expressed their worry that this would lead to tens of thousands of armed Sunnis in autonomous tribal "Awakening groups", leading to Shiite militias growing in reaction, and potentially leading to civil war.

=== 2007 US and others fighting ISI ===
An August 2006 report released by U.S. Marine Corps intelligence had described AI-Qaeda in Iraq as the most dominant force in the Anbar region and as an "integral part of the social fabric of western Iraq". The U.S. intelligence report concluded that MNF-I coalition forces lacked the ability to impede the expansion of the AQ-led insurgency in northern Iraq without a massive American troop surge.

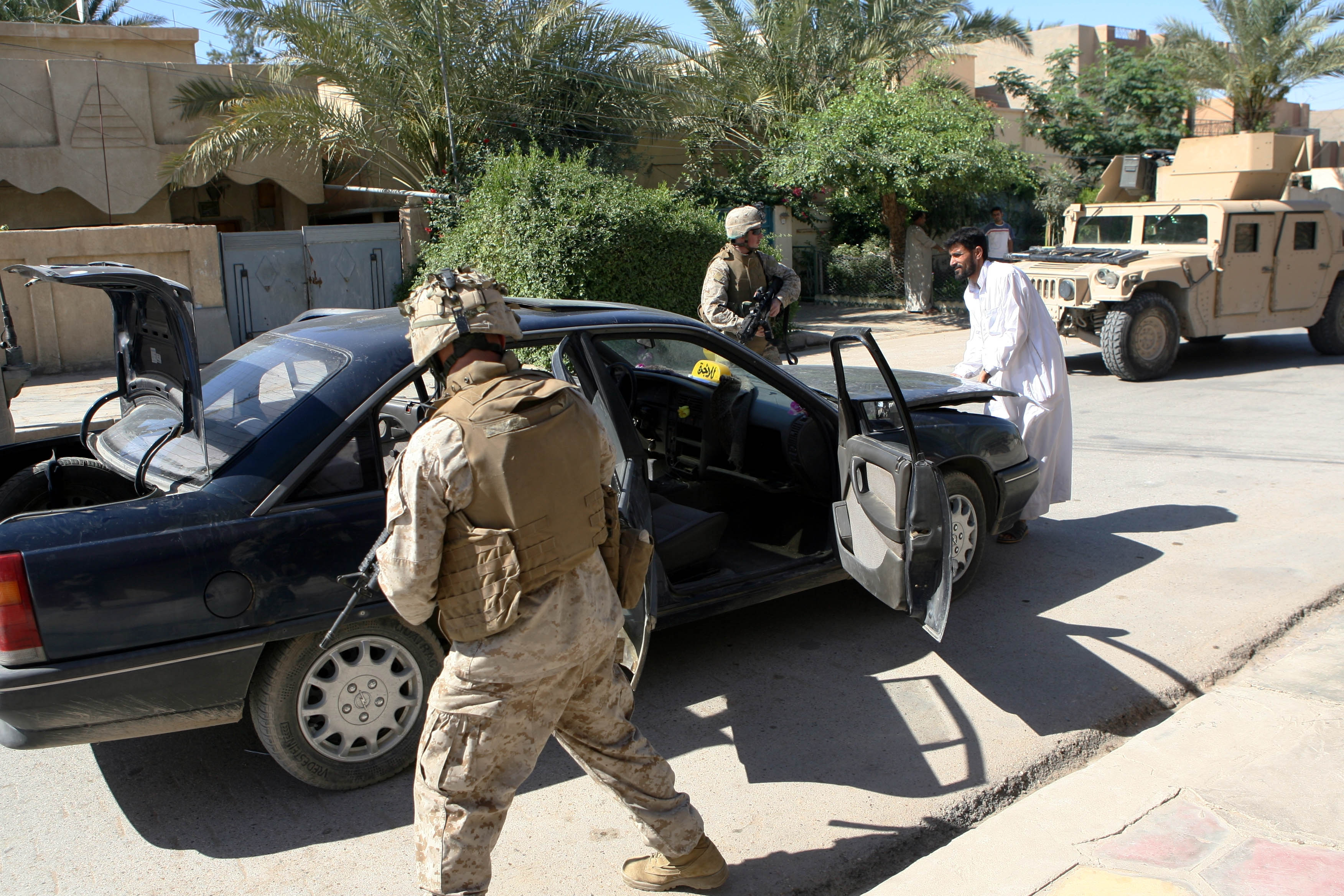
US Marines in Ramadi, May 2006, conducting a snap vehicle checkpoint patrol to disrupt insurgent activity

In January 2007, US President George W. Bush ordered an extra 20,000 soldiers into Iraq ('the surge'), mostly into Baghdad and Al Anbar Governorate, to help provide security and support reconciliation between communities, and explained the decision predominantly by pointing at the "outrageous acts of murder aimed at innocent Iraqis" by "Al Qaeda terrorists".

31 May 2007, in Baghdad's Amariyah district, gunmen shot randomly in the air, claiming through loudspeakers that Amariyah was under control of the Islamic State of Iraq. Armed residents are said to have resisted, set the men's cars on fire, and called the Americans for help; the Americans came in the afternoon, and "it got quiet for a while", according to one resident.

Between March and August 2007, US and Iraqi government forces fought the Battle of Baqubah in the Diyala Governorate against ISI, "to eliminate Al-Qaeda in Iraq terrorists operating in Baqubah and its surrounding areas", resulting in 227 ISI fighters being killed and 100 arrested, and 31 US and 12 Iraqi soldiers being killed. By July 7,000 US troops and 2,500 Iraqi troops were fighting ISI in that battle, the US army claimed that 80 percent of ISI leaders had fled the area.

The US troop surge went into full effect in June 2007, and supplied the military with more manpower for operations targeting Islamic State of Iraq. According to US Colonel Donald Bacon, 19 senior operatives of Islamic State of Iraq were killed or captured by US and Iraqi Security Forces in July; 25 in August; 29 in September; and 45 in October.

By October 2007, US military were believed to have dealt devastating blows to ISI, but a senior intelligence official advised against a declaration of victory over the group, because ISI retained the ability for surprise and catastrophic attacks.

=== 2008 US and others fighting ISI ===
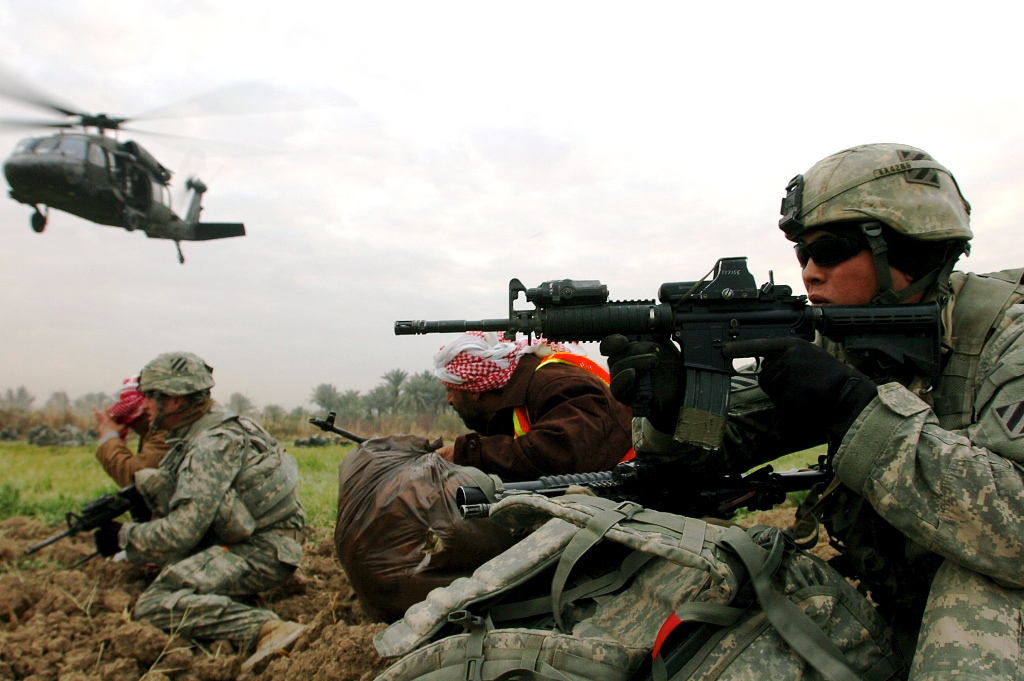
US soldiers and Sunni Arab tribesmen scan for enemy activity in a farm field in southern Arab Jibor, January 2008

In Operation Phantom Phoenix, over January–July 2008, the multi-national force in Iraq attempted to hunt down the last 200 ISI militants in the eastern Diyala Governorate, which resulted in 900 'insurgents' being killed and 2,500 captured, and 59 US, 776 Iraqi, three Georgian and one UK soldiers killed. By May 2008, according to Newsweek, US and Iraqi military offensives had driven AQI from Al Anbar and Diyala Provinces, leaving ISI holed up in and around the northern city of Mosul. The effect of the US troop surge between June 2007 and January 2009, together with American-funding of various groups fighting ISI, was—according to The Washington Post—the killing or detention of 'scores of AQI leaders'.

=== 2009 attacks (possibly) by ISI; revival ===
3 January 2009, a suicide bomb attack in Yusufiyah, 25 miles from Baghdad, killed 23 people; The Christian Science Monitor speculated ISI was responsible. A local Sons of Iraq spokesman said: "There are still some tribes who are trying to hide ISI members".

After the Iraqi provincial elections in January 2009, Islamic State of Iraq offered an olive branch to other Sunni insurgent groups, and even extended "a hand of forgiveness" to those who had worked with the Americans. Some Sunni groups responded positively to this invitation.

Beginning of April 2009, 'Sunni insurgent groups' warned that they would step up attacks against US troops and Iraq's Shiite-led government. Between 7 and 22 April 10 bomb attacks killed 74 people. Two more suicide attacks on 23 April 2009, causing 76 deaths, were without evidence attributed to 'AQI-affiliated' groups. Additional suicide bombings brought the number of Iraqis killed in bombings that month on 350.

In the 20 June 2009 Taza bombing near a mosque, 73 Shias were killed; Western media, like Reuters, hinted at "...Sunni Islamist insurgents, including Al-Qaeda...".

On 19 August 2009, three car bombs exploded in Baghdad, targeting the Iraqi Finance and Foreign Ministries, a hotel and a commercial district, killing 101 and injuring 563 people. The attacks were claimed, two months later, by Islamic State of Iraq, calling the targets "dens of infidelity".

On 25 October 2009 twin bombings targeted Iraqi government buildings in Baghdad killing 155 people and injuring 721, and were also claimed by Islamic State of Iraq.

In November 2009, Islamic State of Iraq issued another plea on the Internet, calling for Sunnis to rally around a common end goal. Iraqi (Shi'ite) Prime Minister Nouri al-Maliki—installed December 2006—claimed in November 2009 that Al-Qaeda in Iraq and former Ba'athists were together trying to undermine security and the January 2010 elections.

8 December 2009, ISI committed five bomb attacks in Baghdad targeting government buildings and a police patrol, killing 127 people and injuring 448 more. ISI declared the targets "headquarters of evil, nests of unbelief".

=== 2010 revival ISI, new attacks ===
On 18 April 2010 Abu Ayyub al-Masri and Abu Omar al-Baghdadi, leader of the Islamic State of Iraq, were killed in a joint US-Iraqi raid on a safehouse near Tikrit, On 16 May 2010 Abu Bakr al-Baghdadi was announced as the new leader of the Islamic State of Iraq; his deputy was Abu Abdallah al-Husseini al-Qurashi.

The New York Times reported that Abu Bakr al-Baghdadi had a preference for his deputies to be former Ba'athist military and intelligence officers who had served during the Saddam Hussein regime and who knew how to fight and make strategic military plans. He built a management structure of mostly middle-aged, Hussein-era Iraqi officers overseeing the group's departments of finance, arms, local governance, military operations and recruitment. These leaders added terrorist techniques, refined through years of fighting American troops, to their traditional military skill, and so made ISI a hybrid of terrorists and army. Analysts believe a Saddam-era officer, known as Haji Bakr, was appointed as military commander of ISI, heading a military council including three other former regime officers.

13 June 2010, suicide bombers disguised in military uniforms attacked the Central Bank of Iraq, killing 18 people and wounding 55. ISI claimed the attack in a 16 June message on the Hanein jihadist forum.

17 August 2010, ISI executed a suicide bomb attack on army recruits queuing outside a recruiting centre in Baghdad, killing 60 people. 19 or 20 August, ISI claimed the attack, saying it targeted "a group of Shias and apostates who sold their faith for money and to be a tool in the war on Iraqi Sunnis".

On 31 October 2010, members of ISI attacked Our Lady of Salvation Syrian Catholic church in Baghdad—purportedly in revenge for an American Christian burning of the Qur'an that had not actually happened yet. 58 worshippers, priests, policemen and bystanders were killed, and many were wounded. The mastermind behind this attack, Huthaifa al-Batawi, was captured and arrested a month later.

=== 2009–2010 US and others fighting ISI ===
In May 2009, Iraqi officials said they again needed US troops in Diyala Governorate, because of suicide bomb attacks.

On 11 March 2010, an ISI operative known as Manaf Abd al-Rahim al-Rawi who was their governor of Baghdad province was arrested by Iraqi authorities. Manaf al-Rawi gave up important information which eventually led the American and Iraqi forces to the locations of the two top ISI leaders, its minister of war Abu Ayyub al-Masri and the "caliph" Abu Omar al-Baghdadi. On 18 April 2010, Abu Ayyub al-Masri and Abu Omar al-Baghdadi, leader of the Islamic State of Iraq, were killed in a joint US-Iraqi raid on a safehouse near Tikrit.

In June 2010, US General Ray Odierno said that 34 of 42 top leaders of ISI had been killed or captured, not specifying the period in which that had happened, and announced that AQI had "lost connection" with its leadership in Pakistan and would have difficulties in recruiting, finding new leaders, establishing havens, or challenging the Iraqi government.

In November 2010, 12 suspects, including Huthaifa al-Batawi, ISI's "Emir of Baghdad", were arrested in connection with the October 2010 assault on Our Lady of Salvation church in Baghdad a month earlier. Al-Batawi was locked up in a counter-terrorism jail complex in Baghdad's Karrada district. During a prison riot and an attempt to escape in May 2011, al-Batawi and 10 other senior ISI militants were killed by an Iraqi SWAT team.

=== Revival in Iraq (2011) ===
According to the United States Department of State, ISI operated in 2011 predominantly in Iraq but it also had carried out an attack in Jordan, and maintained a logistical network throughout the Middle East, North Africa, South Asia and Europe.

In a speech on 22 July 2012, Abu Bakr al-Baghdadi announced a return of ISI to Iraqi strongholds they had been driven from by US forces and allied militias in 2007 and 2008 (see section 2007–2008, US and others fighting ISI), and a launching of the "Breaking the Walls" campaign to free imprisoned ISI members, and urged Iraqi tribal leaders to send their sons "to join the ranks of the mujahideen (fighters) in defense of your religion and honor ... The majority of the Sunnis in Iraq support Al-Qaeda and are waiting for its return to crush the Rawafidh". In that speech, al-Baghdadi also predicted a wave of 40 attacks across Iraq the next day, in which more than 107 were killed and over 200 wounded.

Between July 2012 and July 2013, ISI carried out 24 waves of car bomb attacks and eight prison breaks throughout Iraq. By 2013, the Sunni minority increasingly resented Iraq's Shi'ite led-government, and Sunni insurgents regrouped, carrying out violent attacks and drawing new recruits.

=== Expansion into Syria ===
In August 2011, Abu Bakr al-Baghdadi and Al-Qaeda's central command authorized the Syrian Al-Qaeda member Abu Mohammad al-Julani to set up a Syrian offshoot of Al-Qaeda, to bring down the Syrian Assad government and establish an Islamic state there. Al-Julani was part of a small group of ISI operatives who crossed into Syria, and reached out to cells of militant Islamists who had been released from Syrian military prisons in May–June 2011 and were already fighting an insurgency against Assad's security forces. Al-Julani's group formally announced itself under the name Jabhat al-Nusra l'Ahl al-Sham (Support Front for the People of the Sham) on 23 January 2012.

On 22 July 2012, al-Baghdadi released a 33-minute speech, mostly devoted to the Syrian uprising or civil war: "Our people there have fired the coup de grace at the terror that grasped the nation [Syria] for decades ... and taught the world lessons of courage and jihad and proved that injustice could only be removed by force", he said.

By the second half of 2012, Jabhat al-Nusra stood out among the array of armed groups emerging in Syria as a disciplined and effective fighting force. In December 2012, the U.S. government added Jabhat al-Nusra to its list of "Foreign Terrorist Organizations" and designated the organization as an alias of what the U.S. State Department then described as "Al-Qaeda in Iraq". By January 2013, Al-Nusra was a formidable force with strong popular support in Syria.

On 8 April 2013, ISI leader Abu Bakr al-Baghdadi publicly claimed that he had created Jabhat al-Nusra as a Syrian extension of the ISI and announced that he was forcibly merging it with the ISI into one group under his command, forming the "Islamic State of Iraq and the Levant" (ISIL), also known as "Islamic State of Iraq and Syria" (ISIS). Al-Julani rejected this merger attempt. Al-Nusra split up, some members, particularly foreign fighters, followed al-Baghdadi's edict and joined ISIL, others stayed with al-Julani.

=== Comments on Egypt ===
On 8 February 2011, when Egyptian mass protests ran in their 15th consecutive day, ISI called on Egyptian protesters to wage jihad and strive for an Islamic government: "The market of jihad (has opened) ... the doors of martyrdom have opened ... (Egyptians must ignore the) ignorant deceiving ways of rotten democratic nationalism ... The jihad of the mujahideen is for every Muslim touched by oppression of the tyrant of Egypt and his masters in Washington and Tel Aviv".

=== 2011 US designation ===
On 4 October 2011, the United States Department of State listed ISI leader Abu Bakr al-Baghdadi as a Specially Designated Global Terrorist, and announced a reward of US$10 million for information leading to his capture or death. After his death, ISI reorganized in the multiple provinces of Iraq and increased his operation in 2021, such as attacks in Kirkuk, Diyala Province, Salah al-Din Governorate and Baghdad. To it date there were 8.000 fighters in the province.

=== Redesignations: 2013–2014 ===
==== Islamic State of Iraq and Levant ====
In a video released on 7 April 2013, Abu Bakr al-Baghdadi announced the renaming of ISI as the "Islamic State of Iraq and the Levant" (ISIL), signaling the group's expansion into Syria and its intention to forcibly absorb the Al-Nusra Front. Al-Qaeda Emir Ayman al-Zawahiri strongly denounced the announcement, asserting that Syria was the "spatial state" of the Al-Nusra Front. Al-Zawahiri officially demanded the dissolution of the new entity and urged al-Baghdadi to withdraw all his fighters from Syria and for him to operate only within Iraq. Al-Baghdadi's refusal to withdraw ISIL fighters from Syria and his rejection of al-Zawahiri's demands initiated hostilities between the ISIL and Al-Qaeda, eventually escalating into a full-scale global conflict between the two jihadist organizations.

In a letter addressed to the leaderships of ISIL and Al-Nusra Front, Ayman al-Zawahiri directly rebuked al-Baghdadi's attempt to absorb Al-Nusra Front. Demanding the dissolution of ISIL, al-Zawahiri wrote:

“Sheikh Abu Bakr Al-Baghdadi was wrong when he announced the Islamic State in Iraq and the Levant without asking permission or receiving advice from us and even without notifying us. ... The Islamic State in Iraq and the Levant is to be dissolved, while Islamic State in Iraq is to continue its work. Jabhat Al-Nusra is an independent entity for Qaedat Al-Jihad group, under the (Al-Qaeda) general command. The seat of the Islamic State in Iraq is in Iraq. The seat of Jabhat Al-Nusra for the people of Al-Sham is in Syria.”

Abu Bakr al-Baghdadi publicly rejected the proposals of Ayman al-Zawahiri, marking a turning point in AQ-ISIL relations. According to a report released by Al-Jazeera in June 2013, a source from the Al-Nusra Front described the emerging AQ-ISIL conflict as “the most dangerous development in the history of global jihad”. In an audiotape released by ISIL on 15 June 2013, Abu Bakr al-Baghdadi publicly denounced Al-Zawahiri's letter. In another audiotape, ISIL spokesperson Abu Muhammad al-Adnani condemned al-Zawahiri's demands in harsher terms.

==== Conflict with Al-Qaeda and Al-Nusra Front ====
By January 2014, hostile rhetoric between ISIL and the Al-Nusra Front had escalated into a full-blown violent armed conflict. ISIL began expanding further into north-eastern Syria taking over the territory of smaller rebel groups as well as Jabhat al-Nusra and initiated ground operations against Al-Qaeda and its allies. ISIL expelled the Al-Nusra Front and took complete control of the city Raqqa by 13 January 2014 making it the capital of the organisation. On 1 February 2014, ISIL launched suicide-bombing attacks on the headquarters of the Al-Qaeda-allied Al-Tawhid Brigade militia group in Aleppo, killing 26 people, including the brigade commander Adnan Bakour. Several fighters of the Al-Nusra Front were also killed in the attacks. A day later, the central command of Al-Qaeda issued a public statement condemning the attacks and officially terminating all relations with the ISIL group.

In March 2014, ISIL and Al-Nusra Front fought the Battle of Markada. In parallel, ISIL initiated ground assaults across Deir ez-Zor countryside, which were repelled by Al-Nusra Front and allies. However, ISIL forces were able to capture the strategic town of Markada on 29 March 2014, forcing Al-Nusra Front fighters to pull back and retreat to the Deir ez-Zor countryside. The capture of Markada by ISIL paved the way for the organization's subsequent rapid territorial expansion across Syria and Iraq during its April–July 2014 Deir ez-Zor offensive and June 2014 Northern Iraq Offensive.

==== Re-designation as the "Islamic State" ====
On 10 April 2014, ISIL launched the Deir ez-Zor offensive, and captured the vast majority of the Deir ez-Zor region by the end of the campaign. On 16 April, ISIL killed Abu Muhammad al-Ansari, Al-Nusra Front's Emir in the Mayadin region. Although Al-Nusra Front and allies resisted the attacks, ISIL had managed to capture parts of northern country-side of Raqqa region as well as the strategic parts of Deir ez-Zor. By 10 June, ISIL had gained control over most of the territories of the Deir ez-Zor region north of the Euphrates river and completely expelled the Al-Nusra Front, Free Syrian Army and other Syrian rebels. ISIL subsequently expanded its campaign to the Aleppo region. On 4 June 2014, ISIL launched a major offensive in northern Iraq, gaining control of most regions of Northern Iraq and capturing the cities of Mosul, Baiji, Tal Afar and Tikrit. By the end of the campaign, ISIL had also captured most of Western Iraq and gained full control over the main border crossing of Iraq and Syria. On 29 June 2014, ISIL announced its name change to the "Islamic State" and declared the establishment of a "Caliphate", aiming to rule Iraq, Syria, as well as the entire Muslim world. Proclaiming Ibrahim Abu Bakr al-Baghdadi as “the caliph” and “leader for Muslims everywhere”, as well as demanding the allegiance of all Muslim groups, the announcement by Abu Muhammad al-Adnani stated:

The “Iraq and Shām” in the name of the Islamic State is henceforth removed from all official deliberations and communications, and the official name is the Islamic State from the date of this declaration.

We clarify to the Muslims that with this declaration of khilāfah, it is incumbent upon all Muslims to pledge allegiance to the khalīfah Ibrāhīm and support him (may Allah preserve him). The legality of all emirates, groups, states, and organizations, becomes null by the expansion of the khilāfah’s authority and arrival of its troops to their areas. ...

The khalīfah Ibrāhīm (may Allah preserve him) has fulfilled all the conditions for khilāfah mentioned by the scholars. He was given bay’ah in Iraq by the people of authority in the Islamic State as the successor to Abū ‘Umar al-Baghdādī (may Allah have mercy upon him). His authority has expanded over wide areas in Iraq and Shām. The land now submits to his order and authority from Aleppo to Diyala. So fear Allah, O slaves of Allah. Listen to your khalīfah and obey him. Support your state, which grows everyday – by Allah's grace – with honor and loftiness, while its enemy increases in retreat and defeat.

So rush O Muslims and gather around your khalīfah, so that you may return as you once were for ages, kings of the earth and knights of war.

— Official announcement of the Islamic State organization declaring its establishment of a "Caliphate"

In July 2014, the Islamic State captured numerous villages and towns in the northern Aleppo countryside. In response, Al-Nusra Front and its allied militias such as Liwa al-Tawhid, Ajnad al-Sham, etc. launched a counter-offensive in Northern Aleppo against ISIL. The second issue of the Dabiq magazine, published by the Islamic State group on 27 July 2014, vehemently denounced the leaderships of Al-Nusra Front and Al-Qaeda. Accusing Al-Qaeda of conspiring with the enemies of the Islamic State, the magazine stated:

Despite what the Islamic State faces of economic, military, political, and media war, and despite all the different parties unified against it-from the new Al-Qaeda leadership in Khurasan, to the [S]afawis in Tehran, and all the way to the crusaders in Washington-it advances from victory to victory.... It killed rafidah ("Muslims" according to the new Al-Qaeda leadership) by the thousands. It kept to its promise and destroyed the border obstacles that formerly separated the lands of Iraq from Sham. Its numbers continue to grow.

==== Changes in leadership ====
ISIL Military Council head Haji Bakr, whose name was Samir Abd Muhammad al-Khlifawi, was killed in January 2014, and was succeeded by Abu Abdulrahman al-Bilawi as head of the ISIL Military Council. Al-Bilawi was killed on 4 June 2014, and was reportedly succeeded by Abu Mohannad al-Sweidawi as leader of the ISIL Military Council. There were reports in November 2014 that al-Sweidawi had been killed in an Iraqi airstrike that reportedly also injured Abu Bakr al-Baghdadi. The Daily Beast reported that al-Sweidawi was succeeded by senior IS figure Abu Ali al-Anbari, who was in turn killed on 24 March 2016. Al-Anbari was considered by many as the Islamic State organization's second-in-command in Syria and was viewed as a potential successor of IS leader Abu Bakr al-Baghdadi. The second-in-command in Iraq was Abu Muslim al-Turkmani, who was killed on 18 August 2015, and who was succeeded as the IS leader in Iraq by Abu Fatima al-Jaheishi.

== See also ==
- List of bombings during the Iraq War
