= Sahl Sinjar Air Base =

Former Iraqi Air Force base

Sahl Sinjar Air Base Camp Sinjar
- Nineveh Governorate

Site information
- Condition: Deteriorated

Location
- Coordinates: 35°51′40″N 042°08′36″E

Site history
- Built: 1983
- In use: 1983 — 1991 (Iraqi Air Force)

Location of Sahl Sinjar Air Base, Iraq

Sahl Sinjar Air Base is a former Iraqi Air Force base in the Nineveh Governorate of Iraq. It was captured by Coalition forces during Operation Iraqi Freedom in 2003.

Sahl Sinjar Airbase was located approximately 350 kilometers North of Baghdad, and about 100 kilometers Southwest of Mosul. The airbase was served by a 9,800 foot long runway, and there were two parallel taxiways that could be used as emergency landing strips.

== History ==
In 1983, Sahl Sinjar Air Base was constructed to improve the deployment flexibility of the Iraqi Air Force (IQAF). It was also as part of a national drive to construct new airfields and renovate existing airfields. One 3,445 meter long runway orientated NW/SE was constructed. Additional installation of facilities included 4 high-speed approaches on either ends of the runway which totalled up to 8, two taxiways, two cross-over links, and an apron. There were two dispersal facilities that totalled up to 11 hardstands/aircraft bunkers, with one at the end of each high-speed approaches, and the other three adjoined to the cross-over link. It was in the early-stages of construction by June 1983.

The base was heavily attacked by Coalition airpower during Operation Desert Storm in January 1991, and seized by Coalition ground forces in February 1991. It was abandoned by the Iraqi Air Force after the cease fire in late February and afterwards thoroughly looted.

== Camp Sinjar ==
Camp Sinjar was established by the United States Army 101st Airborne Division at the airfield in late 2003. The National Guard Marksmanship Training Center sent the cadre of its sniper course to northern Iraq to train the soldiers of the 101st Airborne Division (Air Assault) in skills that have proved to be useful during combat operations. The sniper course normally runs at Camp Robinson, North Little Rock, AR. The version being run in Iraq has been changed to suit the environment. The sniper school was set up in the Sinjar region of northwest Iraq because of its vast prairies. The openness of the landscape lends itself well to the long firing ranges that had to be built to accommodate the weapons training in the course, said Command Sgt. Maj. Rory Malloy, 2nd Battalion, 187th Infantry Regiment, 101st Airborne Division (Air Assault).

In mid-October 2003 operations to prevent infiltrations into Iraq were continuing. Operation Chamberlain is designed to provide the Iraqi people with a stable and secure border in order to maintain territorial integrity. In this vein, coalition forces recently intercepted smugglers trying to cross the border southwest of Sinjar. As coalition forces approached the group, the smugglers opened fire on coalition forces. While some of the smugglers escaped, several of them were detained, and in the operation, coalition forces seized weapons and a pickup truck. Other border operations have resulted in the detention of similar individuals trying to illegally cross into Iraq with weapons and money. By the end of October 2003 commanders of the US forces monitoring the border between Iraq and Syria said there was no evidence from human intelligence sources or radar surveillance aircraft indicating that significant numbers of foreign fighters were crossing into Iraq.

Soldiers from the 101st Airborne Division (Air Assault) continue to graduate police officers from academies throughout the Mosul area while 1st Armored Division soldiers are training the Iraqi Police Services in modern policing techniques. The 101st AAD's 3rd Brigade Combat Team, nicknamed the "Rakassans," graduated 60 police officers 26 July 2003 from their academy in Sinjar. The new police officers will serve as future cadre for the academy. The giant Sinjar cement plant in northern Iraq is up and running again, 665 workers back on the job. Written off at the end of the war, the aging plant was looted, inoperable, until General David Petraeus, commander of the 101st Airborne, heard about it. Instead of spending millions on a contract, the 101st took just $10,000 of Saddam Hussein's frozen assets and gave it to the plant managers. Soldiers watched in amazement as the Iraqis cannibalized old machines for parts, fashioned new ones and got the factory running again by 15 September 2003. The plant is currently operating at 50 percent capacity and still turns out 50,000 tons of cement a day. Plans are in place to refurbish the second of two production lines.

Soldiers with the 187th Infantry Regiment, 101st Airborne Division (Air Assault), oversaw the installation of a satellite in Sinjar, allowing locals to communicate with U.S. soldiers for the first time ever. The satellite was installed on a communications tower in the city in northwest Iraq 1 October 2003. The telephone signal covers most of northern Iraq and south to Mosul. The ability to stay in contact with soldiers benefits both Iraqis and soldiers. Not only can Iraqis call in case of emergencies, they can offer tips such as the whereabouts of terrorists or report other suspicious acts.

More than 100 parents and sick children waited outside the Sinjar General Hospital 23 October 2003, anxiously awaiting the opening of the first children's clinic north of Mosul. Medics from 2nd Battalion, 187th Infantry Regiment, 101st Airborne Division (Air Assault) oversaw construction efforts by local contractors of the Sinjar Clinic for Children. The facility, which falls under the hospital's supervision, became the first exclusively pediatric health care center in the 187th's area of operations with its grand opening ceremony Oct. 23. The only other children's clinic in northern Iraq is in Mosul.

In October 2008, 1st Light Armored Reconnaissance Battalion took over operations at Sahl Sinjar Air Field, in support of their mission of counterinsurgency, and show of force. In April of 2009, 1st LAR was relived in place (RIP) by 3rd LAR.

Current aerial imagery shows that the operational structures around the airfield appear to have been demolished and removed. Today the concrete runway and series of taxiways remain exposed and deteriorating to the elements, being reclaimed by the desert.
