= Al-Hadar =

Al-Hadar مدينة الحضر
- Village
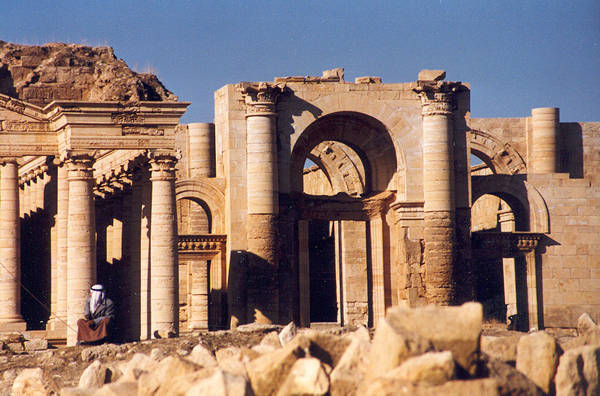
- One of the ancient gates of Hatra
- Interactive map of Al-Hadar
- Location in Iraq
- Coordinates: 35.572888°N 42.73088°E
- Country: Iraq
- Governorate: Nineveh Governorate
- District: Al-Hadar District
- District centre: Al-Hadar District
- Elevation: 145 m (476 ft)

Population (2014)
  - Total: 21,801
- Time zone: UTC+03:00 (AST)
- Country calling code: +964

Al-Hadar is an Iraqi city 80 km (50 mi) southwest of Mosul. It is believed that the city was founded at the beginning of the 2nd century BC. It currently serves as the administrative center of Al-Hadar District in Nineveh Governorate.

The ancient ruins of Hatra lie 2 km (1.2 mi) northwest of the modern settlement. The settlement's population and nearby villages greatly shrank by 2012 due to deforestation.

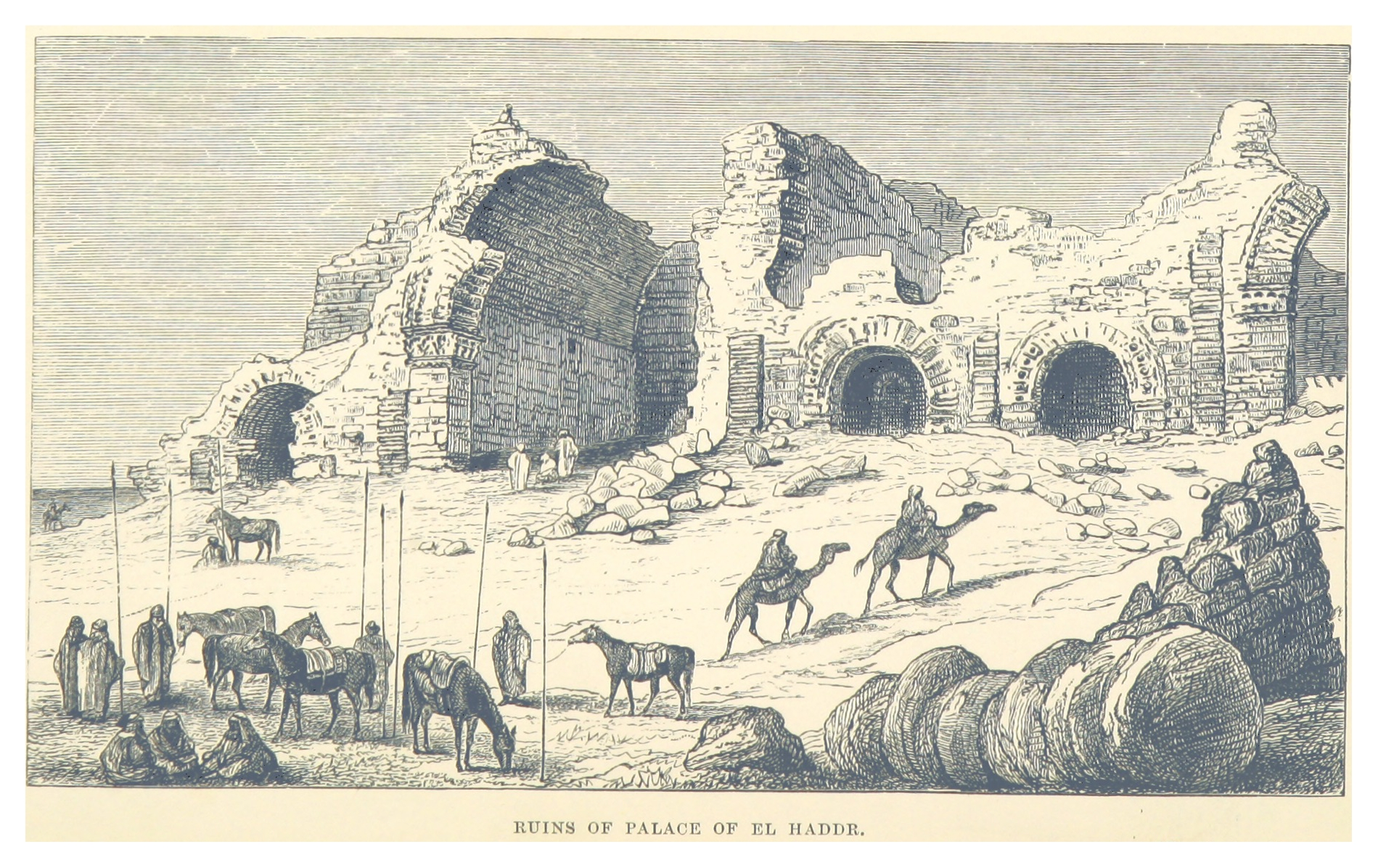
The ruins of Hatra, 1879

Militants of Islamic State of Iraq and the Levant (ISIL) occupied the ruins and their surrounding areas in early 2014. Iraqi soldiers and PMF militia forces retook control on April 26, 2017.

== Capture and destruction of Hatra ==
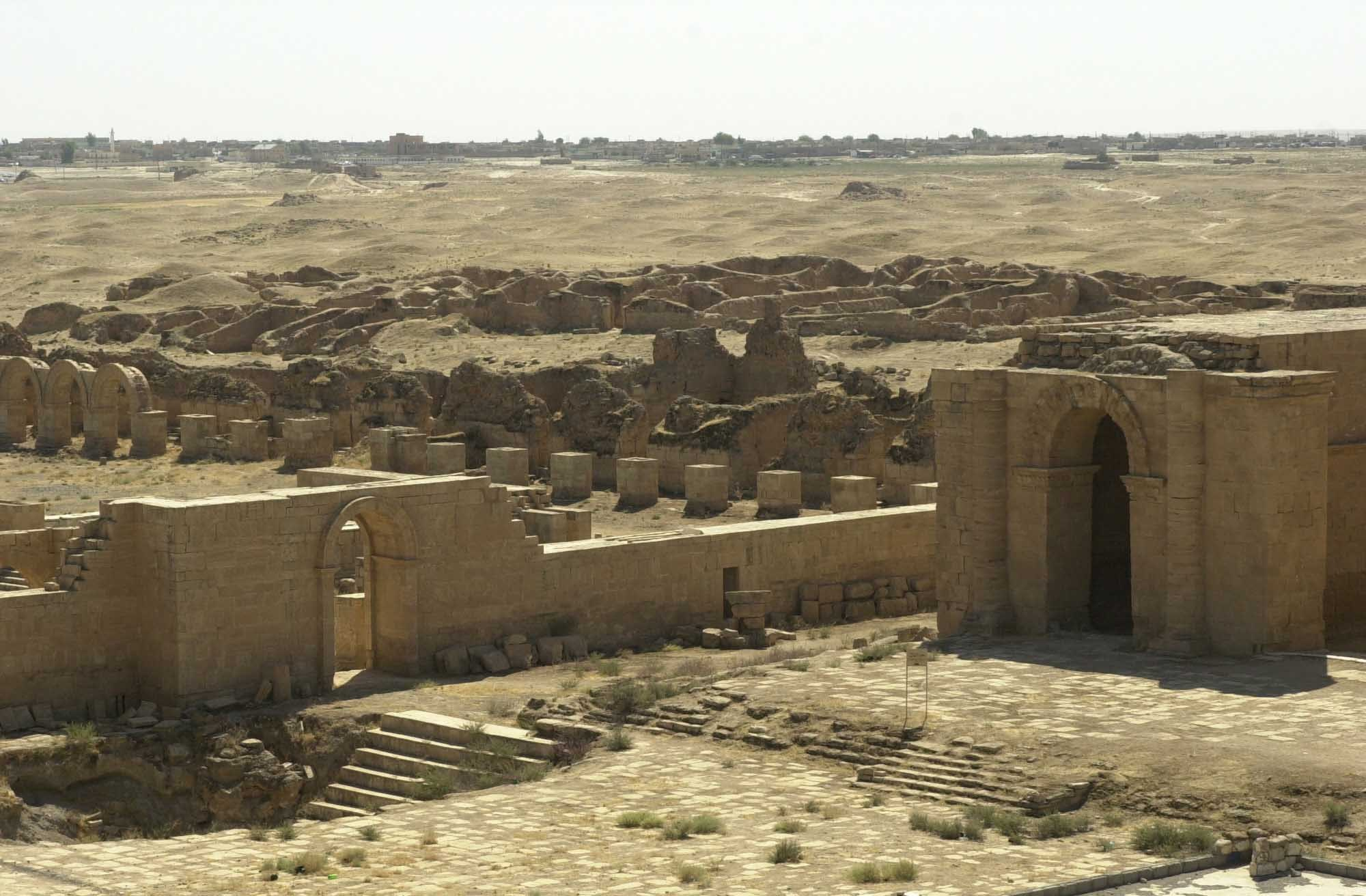
Remains of the ruins of the city of Hatra

On 8 March 2015, ISIL militants destroyed parts of the ancient city of Hatra using bulldozers. This act was considered a crime against Iraqi heritage. Reuters reported that local residents heard a massive explosion early in the morning, while others stated that ISIL used bulldozers to destroy some of Hatra’s largest buildings.

== See also ==
- Hatra
