= Abu Ayyub al-Masri =

Egyptian jihadist militant (1967–2010)

- أَبُو أَيُّوبَ ٱلْمَصْرِيُّ
- Abu Ayyub al-Masri in an undated photo

2nd Emir of Al-Qaeda in Iraq
- In office June 7, 2006 – October 15, 2006
- Preceded by: Abu Musab al-Zarqawi
- Succeeded by: Position abolished Abu Omar al-Baghdadi (as Emir of the Islamic State of Iraq)

2nd Emir of the Mujahideen Shura Council
- In office June 7, 2006 – October 15, 2006
- Preceded by: Abu Musab al-Zarqawi
- Succeeded by: Position abolished Abu Omar al-Baghdadi (as Emir of the Islamic State of Iraq)

War Minister of the Islamic State of Iraq
- In office October 15, 2006 – April 18, 2010
- Preceded by: Position created
- Succeeded by: Abu Suleiman al-Naser

Prime Minister of the Islamic State of Iraq
- In office September 9, 2009 – April 18, 2010
- Preceded by: Abu Abdulrahman al-Falahi
- Succeeded by: Abu Suleiman al-Naser

Personal details
- Born: Abdel Moneim Ezz El-Din Ali Al-Badawi عبد المنعم عز الدين علي البدوي; 1967 Kafr Al Asar, Sharqia Governorate, United Arab Republic (present-day Egypt)
- Died: 18 April 2010 (aged 42–43) Tikrit, Saladin Governorate, Iraq
- Cause of death: Airstrike

Military service
- Allegiance: Muslim Brotherhood (unknown–1982); Egyptian Islamic Jihad (1982–1999); Al-Qaeda (2002–2010); Jama'at al-Tawhid wal-Jihad (unknown–2004); Al-Qaeda in Iraq (2004–2006); Islamic State of Iraq (2006–2010); Mujahideen Shura Council (January–October 2006)
- Years of service: 1980s–2010
- Rank: Emir of Al-Qaeda in Iraq (June – October 2006) Emir of the Mujahideen Shura Council (June – October 2006) Minister of the Islamic State of Iraq (October 2006 – April 2010)
- Battles/wars: Third Afghan Civil War; Iraq War; Iraqi Insurgency; First Battle of Fallujah; Second Battle of Fallujah; Islamic Army-Al-Qaeda conflict

Abu Ayyub al-Masri (Note: /ˈɑːbuː ɑːˈjuːb ɑːl ˈmɑːsri/ AH-boo ah-YOOB ahl MAHSS-ree; أَبُو أَيُّوبَ ٱلْمَصْرِيُّ, ʾAbū ʾAyyūb al-Maṣrī, translation: "Father of Job the Egyptian") (1967 – 18 April 2010), also known as Abu Hamza al-Muhajir, (Note: ; أَبُو حَمْزَةَ ٱلْمُهَاجِرِ ʾAbū Ḥamzah al-Muhāǧir, translation: "Father of Hamza the immigrant") and born Abdel Moneim Ezz El-Din Ali Al-Badawi, (Note: Arabic: عبد المنعم عز الدين علي البدوي) was an Egyptian militant who became the leader of al-Qaeda in Iraq (AQI) during the Iraqi insurgency, following the death of Abu Musab al-Zarqawi in June 2006. He was appointed as the "minister of war" of the Islamic State of Iraq (ISI) from 2006 to 2010 and prime minister of the ISI from 2009 to 2010. He was killed along with ISI's leader Abu Omar al-Baghdadi during a raid on their safe house on 18 April 2010.

== Early life and militant career ==
Abdel Moneim Ezz El-Din Ali Al-Badawi was born in Kafr Al Asar, Sharqia Governorate, Egypt. (Note: In a November 2010 interview by Kuwaiti news outlet al-Jarida with Ibrahim al-Banna, a senior leader of Al-Qaeda in the Arabian Peninsula, who met with Abu Hamza while he was in Yemen, claimed that Abu Hamza's real name was Abd-al-Mun’im al-Badawi, which supported an earlier 2009 al-Qaeda statement describing the makeup of a new "War Cabinet".) He joined the Muslim Brotherhood and joined Ayman al-Zawahiri's organization, Egyptian Islamic Jihad, in 1982. Al-Masri and al-Zawahiri worked together. Al-Masri went to Afghanistan in 1999, where he became affiliated with the al-Qaeda militant organization and attended al-Qaeda leader Osama bin Laden's al-Farouk camp, becoming an expert with explosives.

Al-Masri entered Yemen using a fake passport under the name Yussef Haddad Labib, and taught in village schools. In 1998, in Sanaa, Yemen, al-Masri married Hasna Yahia Ali Hussein, a Yemeni native. They had three children.

== Move to Iraq ==
After the 2001 U.S. invasion of Afghanistan, al-Masri went to Iraq via the United Arab Emirates in 2002, according to a later account by his widow. He lived initially in Baghdad's Karrada, then in the Amiriya fainal, and then al-Jadida, where he took charge of al-Qaeda's operations in the southern part of the country. The United States military said that al-Masri "helped draw other insurgent groups into al-Qaeda’s fold." DefenseLINK News reported that Masri "helped establish the Baghdad cell of al-Qaeda in early 2003". Soon after, he "worked the ‘rat line’ down the Euphrates river valley, supplying suicide bombers via Syria."

After the U.S.-led 2003 invasion of Iraq, the family left Baghdad for Diyala to the north. Hussein later recalled: "The two-storey house where we were was hit in a U.S. air raid. Then, one of the men was killed but my husband and I were able to escape to Fallujah", the Sunni city that was, at the time, a bastion of the anti-U.S. Iraqi insurgency. Al-Masri participated in the major 2004 Battle of Fallujah. After U.S. troops stormed the town in November 2004, the family moved to Abu Ghraib. In 2007, al-Masri and his family moved to the Lake Tharthar area. Hussein claimed: "We were changing houses the whole time, right up to his death".

== Alleged killings ==
In a text posted online, al-Qaeda in Iraq claimed that al-Masri personally killed two U.S. Army soldiers who disappeared after an ambush in Iraq on 16 June 2006, as a means of "making his presence felt." Their bodies were later found mutilated and booby-trapped in Yusufiyah, Iraq, on 19 June 2006.

On 20 September 2006, al-Masri claimed responsibility for personally killing Turkish hostage Murat Yuce, whose execution by gunshots was captured in a video released in August 2004. He had been kidnapped in late July 2004 by Jama'at al-Tawhid wal-Jihad, along with Turk co-worker Aytullah Gezmen, who was released in September 2004.

== Leadership roles ==
Al-Masri was on the list of persons wanted by the coalition forces and Iraqi authorities in 2005, or possibly earlier.

The Mujahideen Shura Council (MSC), which included AQI and other Iraqi insurgent groups, named al-Masri as their new emir in June 2006, following the death of AQI's leader, Abu Musab al-Zarqawi. However, National Security Advisor Stephen Hadley said: "It’s not clear at this point who is in control. We’ve seen a number of different reports ... In our view it’s not yet settled." On 15 October, MSC was renamed the Islamic State of Iraq (ISI). Abu Omar al-Baghdadi was appointed as its emir, and al-Masri as "Minister of War".

After al-Baghdadi's alleged capture by the American forces on 7 March 2007, the media started reporting about al-Masri's standing in the insurgency, and a video tape was released to the media in which al-Masri proclaims al-Baghdadi "the commander of the believers", with Iraqi al-Qaeda fighters under his command. Al-Masri was denoted as "al-Zarqawi's successor" by the Coalition and the Bush administration posted a bounty on him, later raised to $25 million.

In 2008, the bounty was reduced to $100,000, with Central Command spokesman Jamie Graybeal stating that "The current assessment [is that al-Masri] is not [an] effective leader of al-Qaeda in Iraq as he was last year," but that "for security reasons", he could not go into detail about the assessment. The reduction of reward money knocked al-Masri off the U.S. State Department "Rewards for Justice" program list, and placed him on a Department of Defense list for people with lower bounties.

On October 24, 2008, an interview with al-Masri was released. In it, he said his group carried out its "last operation in Britain, a good part of which was launched on the airport, and the rest was not carried out due to a mistake made by one of the brothers." There is support for this claim as just before the two men set off from Loch Lomond to Glasgow Airport, Kafeel Ahmed sent a text message to his brother Sabeel in Liverpool telling him to go to an email account. Bilal Abdulla, the other bomber, addressed his will to al-Masri and al-Baghdadi. There were reports that al-Masri recruited people for the plot between 2004 and 2005.

== False death reports ==
Al-Masri was erroneously reported killed during a U.S. raid in Haditha in October 2006, and in an "internal battle between militants" in May 2007. The person killed in the latter report was actually Muharib Abdul Latif al-Jubouri, a senior member of AQI and the "public relations minister" of al-Baghdadi's shadow cabinet.

== Death ==
On April 18, 2010, al-Masri was killed in a joint American and Iraqi operation near Tikrit. The coalition forces believed al-Masri to be wearing a suicide vest and proceeded cautiously. After the lengthy exchange of fire and bombing of the house, the Iraqi troops stormed inside and found two women still alive, one of whom was al-Masri's wife, al-Baghdadi, and al-Baghdadi's son. A suicide vest was found on al-Masri's corpse, according to the Iraqi Army. Iraqi Prime Minister Nouri al-Maliki announced the killings of al-Baghdadi and al-Masri at a news conference in Baghdad and showed reporters photographs of their corpses. "The attack was carried out by ground forces which surrounded the house, and also through the use of missiles. During the operation, computers were seized with emails and messages [to] bin Laden [and] Ayman al-Zawahiri". Maliki added. U.S. General Raymond Odierno praised the operation: "The death of these terrorists is potentially the most significant blow to al-Qaeda [operations] in Iraq since the beginning of the insurgency. There is still work to do but this is a significant step forward in ridding Iraq of terrorists."

On April 25, 2010, ISI confirmed the deaths of al-Masri and al-Baghdadi on a militant website. The ISI's Sharia minister, Abu al-Walid Abd al-Wahhab al-Mashadani, stated in the announcement that the two leaders were attending a meeting when "enemy forces" engaged them in battle and launched an airstrike on their location. The announcement, in an apparent reference to the previous Friday's extensive bomb attacks, claimed that the "Crusaders and the Shi'ites will exploit the incident to improve the image of Iraqi security services and give the enemy alliance an 'illusory' victory after the mass-casualty incidents carried out by the ISI in Baghdad."

U.S. Vice President Joe Biden stated that the deaths of the top two ISI figures were "potentially devastating" blows to the organization, and proof that Iraqi security forces were gaining ground.

On May 14, 2010, al-Nasser Lideen Illah Abu Suleiman replaced al-Masri as war minister of the Islamic State of Iraq.

Hussein was arrested in the same operation in which al-Masri was killed. She then asserted that al-Masri had always been a "secretive character", and that "I only found out that [my husband] was Abu Ayyub al-Masri after the death [of] al-Zarqawi". In 2011, Hussein was sentenced to death in Iraq.

== See also ==
- Abu Yaqub al-Masri

== Notes ==
Preceded by Abu Musab al-Zarqawi	Head of Al-Qaeda in Iraq; 2006–2010	Succeeded by Abu Bakr al-Baghdadi (Emir of the Islamic State of Iraq)
