= Military of the Islamic State =

- Flag of the Islamic State
- Active: 1999–2014 (as an insurgent force under various names); 2014–present (officially as a branch of the Islamic State)
- Country: Main: Afghanistan; Democratic Republic of Congo; Egypt; Iraq; Libya; Mozambique; Nigeria; Pakistan; Somalia; Syria; Yemen; Niger; Mali; Philippines In the Levant; 5,000–10,000 (UN Security Council 2019 report); 70,000 (Russian military estimate in 2014); 100,000 (IS claim in 2015); 5,000–15,000 (Defense Department estimate); 2,000–5,000 (State Department estimate) Outside the Levant: West Africa: 7,000–10,000 (Feb. 2015 estimate of Boko Haram fighters); Libya: estimates vary; 5,000–6,500 (Feb. 2016, New York Times citing Pentagon officials) "about 5,000" (Feb. 2016, al-Jazeera citing "security analyst") "up to 6,500" (Feb. 2016, CNN citing "several U.S. intelligence officials"); Jordan: several thousand members of Salafi jihadist groups that have pledged allegiance to IS (Jordan Times, 2014) Several Jordanian jihadist ideologues have endorsed IS IS sleeper cells exist in the country (about 20 killed by Jordanian security forces, and many more arrested, from 2014 to April 2016) 2,000+ Jordanians became IS foreign fighters in Iraq and Syria.; Turkey: nearly 1,000 arrested by Turkish security forces in 2015; Egypt: 1,000-1,500 members of IS's Sinai Province, primarily in North Sinai Governorate where Sinai insurgency was ongoing (May 2016, Wilson Center estimate); Yemen: "dozens"; (Jan. 2015, CNN citing Yemeni official) "about 300" (June 2015, Aimen Dean estimate to Reuters) By March 2016, IS numbers in Yemen were falling; Afghanistan and Pakistan (IS's "Khorasan Province"): 300 (Jan. 2015, IS commander claim, cited by New York Times) 2,000, including 500 in allied Islamic Movement of Uzbekistan group (Sept. 2015 estimate by spokesman for Abdul Rashid Dostum, reported by AP); Somalia: 200–300; Algeria: unknown; Saudi Arabia: unknown, presence in central Saudi Arabia; Saudi authorities have arrested more than 1,600 suspected IS supporters (Wilson Center, 2016); Russia: unknown, North Caucasus region (Dagestan, Chechnya, Ingushetia, and Kabardino-Balkaria). In June 2015, IS accepted the pledge of allegiance of the formerly al-Qaeda-affiliated Caucasus Emirate, which became IS's "Caucasus Province" (Wilson Center, 2016); Jammu and Kashmir, India: about 30 youth from area thought to have become IS foreign fighters (Oct. 2014, Times of India citing security agencies); Europe: unknown; presence of sleeper cells and lone wolf operatives and IS is thought to have attempted to smuggle militants to Europe
- Headquarters: Raqqa, Syria (2013–2017)
- Engagements: War in Afghanistan (2001–2021); Iraqi conflict Syrian civil war Boko Haram insurgency Libyan civil war (2014–2020); Sinai insurgency Yemeni civil war (2014–present); Insurgency in Khyber Pakhtunkhwa; Insurgency in Jammu and Kashmir; Somali Civil War (2009–present); Moro conflict Gaza–Israel conflict For more details, see List of wars and battles involving the Islamic State

Commanders
- Current commander: Abu Suleiman al-Naser † ("War Minister"/Head of Military Council, until 2011): Haji Bakr † (Head of Military Council, until Jan 2014); Abu Abdulrahman al-Bilawi † (Head of Military Council, until June 2014); Abu Muhannad al-Suwaydawi † (Head of Military Council, until Nov 2014); Abu Jandal al-Kuwaiti † (second-in-command in Syria, late 2016); Abu Omar al-Shishani † (leading field commander); Abu Waheeb † (Commander in Anbar, Iraq); Abu Nabil al-Anbari † (Emir and Commander in Libya, until 2015); Abdul Qader al-Najdi † (Emir and Commander in Libya, until 2020); Muhammad Abdullah (Commander in Derna, Libya); Abu Musab al-Barnawi (Emir, Commander and Head of the ISWAP's shura in West Africa); Abu Osama al-Masri † (Emir and Commander in Sinai); Hafiz Saeed Khan † (Emir and Commander in Afghanistan and Pakistan); Abu Muhammad al-Kadari † (Emir and Commander in North Caucasus)

The military forces of the Islamic State is the fighting force of the Islamic State (IS). The total force size at its peak was estimated from tens of thousands to over 200,000. IS's armed forces grew quickly during its territorial expansion in 2014. The IS military, including groups incorporated into it in 2014, openly operated and controlled territory in multiple cities in Libya and Nigeria. In October 2016, it conquered the city of Qandala in Puntland, Somalia. It conquered much of eastern Syria and western Iraq in 2014, territory it finally lost in 2019. It also had border clashes with and made incursions into Lebanon, Iran, and Jordan. IS-linked groups operate in Algeria, Pakistan, the Philippines, Cameroon, Niger, and Chad. In January 2015, IS was also confirmed to have a military presence in Afghanistan and in Yemen.

The Islamic State's military is based on light infantry mobile units using vehicles such as gun-equipped pick-up trucks (technicals), motorbikes and buses for fast advances. They have also used artillery, tanks and armored vehicles, much of which they captured from the Iraqi and Syrian Armies. IS has a long history of using truck and car bombs, suicide bombers, and improvised explosive devices. They have also deployed chemical weapons in Iraq and Syria.

== Command structure ==
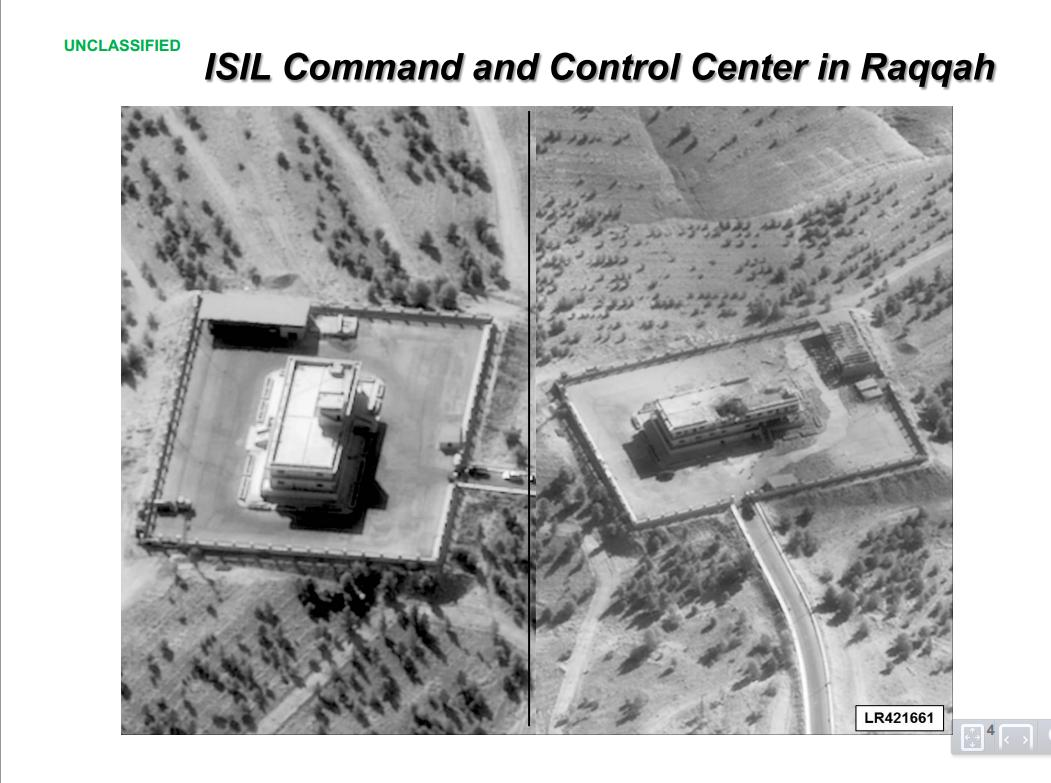
An IS command and control center in Raqqa in 2014.

According to the Institute for the Study of War, IS's 2013 annual report reveals a metrics-driven military command, which is "a strong indication of a unified, coherent leadership structure that commands from the top down". Middle East Forum's Aymenn Jawad Al-Tamimi said, "They are highly skilled in urban guerrilla warfare while the new Iraqi Army simply lacks tactical competence."

IS's Military Council is made up of numerous former military officers from the Saddam Hussein era. Commanders have included Haji Bakr, a colonel; Abu Abdulrahman al-Bilawi, a captain; and Abu Ayman al-Iraqi, a lieutenant colonel, who all graduated from the same Iraqi military academy. Abu Muslim al-Turkmani, al-Baghdadi's former deputy, was a Directorate of General Military Intelligence lieutenant colonel. All these men spent time detained in Camp Bucca during the American occupation of Iraq. Abu Omar al-Shishani, who was a sergeant in the Georgian Army before leading an IS unit in Syria, also became a prominent commander.

IS's fighters are reportedly organised into seven branches: infantry, snipers, air defence, special forces, artillery forces, the "army of adversity", and the Caliphate Army. This force structure is largely replicated in each of its designated provinces, with the most skilled fighters and military strategists in each area serving in the special forces unit, which is not allowed to redeploy to other provinces. Parallel to this structure is the Caliphate Army, which is directed by IS's central command rather than its provincial leadership. Made up overwhelmingly of foreign fighters, it is deployed to assist in battles across the Islamic State. There is also an all-female Al-Khansaa Brigade tasked with enforcing religious laws. According to battle reports, IS often operates in small mobile fighting units.

The Islamic State also operates outside areas it largely controls using a clandestine cell system. An IS-linked senior militant commander in Sinai told Reuters; "They [IS] teach us how to carry out operations. We communicate through the internet, ... they teach us how to create secret cells, consisting of five people. Only one person has contact with other cells. They are teaching us how to attack security forces, the element of surprise. They told us to plant bombs then wait 12 hours so that the man planting the device has enough time to escape from the town he is in."

== Tactics ==
The military of IS is organized as a mixture of an irregular insurgent force and a conventional army. In its Syrian and Iraqi territory, the Islamic State organized professional units for specialised tasks, with the "Tank Battalion", the "Artillery Battalion", and the "Platoons of Special Tasks" being among the most important. The first one employed heavy armoured fighting vehicles, the second heavy artillery, while the last one was used as a rapid intervention force. The three regularly worked in tandem for breakthrough and important defense operations, made possible by a well-organised logistics system that kept operating even under regular bombardments by anti-IS forces.

In contrast to these elite forces, most of IS' troops were local militias with few heavy weapons, usually deployed as territorial defense units. Less trained or less valuable troops were sometimes involved with offensive operations, although their tactics were less sophisticated. The Islamic State stood in sharp contrast to some other jihadist organizations such as the Caucasus Emirate which generally attempted to minimize their own casualties, and became notorious for its willingness to sacrifice many of its fighters. This is especially true in regard to IS's callous use of new recruits. Islamic State military training had a reputation for its strong focus on indoctrination, often to the detriment of more pertinent lessons. The organization's high command used inexperienced recruits for swarming and human wave tactics, often resulting in extremely high casualties. One high-ranking IS commander known for this approach was Abu Omar al-Shishani, who successfully employed swarming tactics during the Siege of Menagh Air Base and Battle of Tabqa Airbase. According to his reasoning, the enemy would eventually be overwhelmed or run out of ammunition regardless of the casualties among IS fighters. Regional expert Joanna Paraszczuk sarcastically remarked that al-Shishani's tactics were based on the belief that "everyone want[s] to be a Shahid" (martyr), although not all Islamic State commanders showed such a readiness to sacrifice troops.

Following the Siege of Kobanî, which resulted in large losses among its veterans and commanders (including 2,000 militants killed), IS was forced to promote several inexperienced commanders and to rely even more than before on new recruits. As result, the tactics of the Islamic State's military became cruder. Paraszczuk noted that the jihadists' strategies and tactics sometimes broke down completely due to this. For example, some troops were essentially ordered to "just run towards the [enemy] and fight or whatever" during the 2015 Battle of Hasakah, even though they were targeted by massive aerial bombardments and their attacks had no apparent strategic value.

Technicals play an important role for IS in a variety of combat purposes, ranging from quick-reaction forces, to tank equivalents, to self-defendable car bombs that can attack heavily defended targets.

In addition to suicide bomber attacks, IS also employs the use of special units called Inghimasi (Arabic for "become immersed"), who utilise both conventional firearms and suicide bombs, attacking enemy positions with their firearms, and then detonating their suicide bombs when they run out of ammunition or believe they are trapped. Their goal is specifically to inflict as many casualties as they can upon the enemy before dying, acting as a form of shock troops. Inghimasi are also deployed against civilians, such as in the November 2015 Paris attacks. Inghimasi may sometimes be deployed en masse but are usually deployed in small teams.

== Troops ==
=== Troops in Iraq and Syria ===
In June 2014, the Islamic State had at least 4,000 fighters in Iraq. By September 2014, the CIA estimated that the group had grown to 20,000–31,500 fighters in Iraq and Syria, while the Syrian Observatory for Human Rights (SOHR) put its estimate at around 80,000 total (up to 50,000 in Syria and 30,000 in Iraq) by August 2014. An Iraqi Kurdish leader even estimated in November 2014 that the Islamic State's military had 200,000 fighters. The group's rapid growth was partially facilitated by IS forcing other rebel groups to fight for it, as well as conscripting individuals. In general, a large part of IS's Iraqi and Syrian armies consisted of local militias whose loyalty was generally somewhat dubious. These local forces were put under commanders from IS's core group, and only those groups who proved themselves trustworthy were provided with better weaponry. In 2015, Reuters quoted "jihadist ideologues" as claiming that IS has 40,000 fighters and 60,000 supporters. As a result of suffering major defeats from 2017 to 2019, the strength of IS was greatly reduced in the Middle East. By 2021, the group was estimated to field about 10,000 fighters in Syria and Iraq, although it still possessed a far greater network of supporters and sympathizers which could potentially enable it to rapidly swell its ranks in the future.

Ethnically, the Islamic State's military is dominated by Sunni Arabs. However, the group also recruited Kurds in Iraq and Syria. However, IS became increasingly anti-Kurdish over time, and even began to use anti-Kurdish racism as recruiting tool.

=== Foreign fighters in Iraq and Syria ===
There are many foreign fighters in IS's ranks. In June 2014, The Economist reported that IS "may have up to 6,000 fighters in Iraq and 3,000–5,000 in Syria, including perhaps 3,000 foreigners; nearly a thousand are reported to hail from Chechnya and perhaps 500 or so more from France, Britain and elsewhere in Europe." Chechen leader Abu Omar al-Shishani, for example, was made commander of the northern sector of IS in Syria in 2013. According to The New York Times, in September 2014 there were more than 2,000 Europeans and 100 Americans among IS's foreign fighters. As of mid-September 2014, around 1,000 Turks had joined IS, and as of October 2014, 2,400–3,000 Tunisians had joined the group. An IS deserter alleged that foreign recruits were treated with less respect than Arabic-speaking Muslims by IS commanders and were placed in suicide units if they lacked otherwise useful skills. According to a UN report, an estimated 15,000 fighters from nearly 70 countries have travelled to Iraq and Syria to join militant groups, including IS.

Reuters has stated that according to jihadist ideologues, 10 percent of IS's fighters in Iraq and 30 percent of its fighters in Syria are from outside those countries.

As of September 29, 2015, the CIA estimated that 30,000 foreign fighters had come to join IS. As of October 2015, 21% came from Europe, 50% from Western Asia or North Africa, and 29% from elsewhere; according to the Global Terrorism Index and other sources, they were of the following nationalities:

=== List of nationalities of foreign nationals pledging to IS ===
This is a list of nationalities of foreigners who joined IS from June 2014 to June 2018. This list does not include citizens of Syria, or Iraq. This list includes women and children who joined IS, many of whom were noncombatants. In total, 41,490 non-Iraqis and non-Syrians joined IS's main branch in these countries (32,089 were adult men), of whom 7,366 (5,930 were adult men) returned to their countries of departure, sometimes to face charges; most of the rest are presumed dead.

- Russia: 5,000 (380 returnees)
- Tunisia: 4,000 (900 returnees)
- Jordan: 3,950 (250 returnees)
- Saudi Arabia: 3,244 (760 returnees)
- Turkey: 3,000 (900 returnees)
- Uzbekistan: 2,500
- France: 1,910 (398 returnees)
- Morocco: 1,699 (236 returnees)
- Tajikistan: 1,502 (147 returnees)
- China: 1,000
- Germany: 960 (303 returnees)
- Lebanon: 900
- Azerbaijan: 900 (49 returnees)
- Kyrgyzstan: 863 (63 returnees)
- United Kingdom: 850 (425 returnees)
- Indonesia: 800 (183 returnees)
- Kazakhstan: 600 (113-128 returnees)
- Libya: 600
- Egypt: 600
- Turkmenistan: 500
- Belgium: 498 (123 returnees)
- Kosovo: 359 (133 returnees)
- Bosnia and Herzegovina: 323 (56 returnees)
- Sweden: 311 (150 returnees)
- Netherlands: 300 (60 returnees)
- Algeria: 278 (87)
- United States: 272 (40 returnees)
- Austria: 254 (94 returnees)
- Australia: 214 (40 returnees)
- Spain: 208 (30 returnees)
- Maldives: 200
- Georgia: 200 (17 returnees)
- North Macedonia: 155 (72 returnees)
- Malaysia: 154 (8 returnees)
- Kuwait: 150 (6 returnees)
- Denmark: 145 (72 returnees)
- Albania: 144 (44 returnees)
- South Africa: 140 (11 returnees)
- Sudan: 140 (2 returnees)
- Trinidad and Tobago: 130
- Italy: 129 (11 returnees)
- Finland: 122 (43 returnees)
- Afghanistan: 120
- Yemen: 110
- Philippines: 100
- Norway: 100 (40 returnees)
- Canada: 100 (17 returnees)
- Pakistan: 100
- Kenya: 100
- Bahrain: 100
- India: 75 (11 returnees)
- Somalia: 70
- Switzerland: 70 (14 returnees)
- Israel: 60 (10 returnees)
- Serbia: 59 (7 returnees)
- Iran: 50
- Bangladesh: 40 (25 returnees)
- Poland: 40
- Sri Lanka: 32
- Ireland: 30
- Montenegro: 27 (10 returnees)
- Argentina: 23
- Qatar: 15
- United Arab Emirates: 15
- Portugal: 15 (2 returnees)
- New Zealand: 11
- Ghana: 10
- Bulgaria: 10
- Slovenia: 10 (2 returnees)
- Japan: 9
- Taiwan: 8
- Singapore: 8
- Croatia: 7
- Slovakia: 6
- Brazil: 3
- Brunei: 1–3
- Madagascar: 3
- Latvia: 2
- Ukraine: 2
- Estonia: 1
- South Korea: 1
- Chile: 1
- Iceland: 1
- Romania: 1
- Moldova: 1
- Luxembourg: 1
- Cambodia: 1
- Senegal: 1

=== Allegiance to IS from groups outside Iraq and Syria ===
- Wilayat Algeria formed from the Algerian Jund al-Khilafah after it pledged allegiance to IS.
- Wilayat Barqa and others formed from the allegiance of Libyan militants like the Shura Council of Islamic Youth, and defectors formerly associated with Ansar al-Sharia in Libya.
- Wilayat Sinai formed from the majority of the membership of Egypt's Ansar Bait al-Maqdis
- Wilayat Yemen formed from militants in Yemen, including defectors from Ansar al-Sharia and al-Qaeda in the Arabian Peninsula.
- Wilayat Najd and others formed from unidentified militants in Saudi Arabia.
- Wilayat Khorasan formed from the allegiance of militants from groups based in Pakistan and Afghanistan, including Jundallah, Tehreek-e-Khilafat, the Islamic Movement of Uzbekistan and dissident commanders formerly associated with Tehrik-i-Taliban Pakistan.
- Wilayat Gharb Afriqiya formed from Boko Haram pledging allegiance to IS.
- Wilayat al-Qawqaz formed from dissident militants of the Caucasus Emirate in Chechnya and Dagestan who switched their allegiance to IS.
- Militants of the group Sheikh Omar Hadid Brigade (Palestinian Territories) pledged allegiance to IS.
- Militants of the group Abu Sayyaf under Isnilon Totoni Hapilon and Radullan Sahiron (Philippines, Malaysia). pledged allegiance to IS.
- Militants of the group Sons of the Call for Tawhid and Jihad (Jordan) pledged allegiance to IS.
- Militants of the group Free Sunnis of Baalbek Brigade (Lebanon) pledged allegiance to IS.
- The group Islamic State of the Maldives pledged allegiance to IS in July 2014.
- Members of Ansar Khalifa Philippines pledged allegiance to IS and they start using IS props in their training.
- Some Bangladeshi terrorist cells pledged allegiance to IS and starts attacking civilians and bloggers.
- Some members of Jamaah Ansharut Tauhid, including leader Abu Bakar Ba'asyir and Mujahidin Indonesia Timur pledged allegiance.
- Abnaa ul-Calipha was formed by some Al-Shabaab dissidents in Puntland, led by Abdul Qadir Mumin, who pledged allegiance to IS in 2015. Since then, Al-Shabaab has unsuccessfully attempted to kill these defectors.
- Jabha East Africa, an Islamist group operating in Kenya, Tanzania, Somalia and Uganda, defected from Al-Qaeda and pledged allegiance to IS.
- In 2016, Abu-Walid al-Sahraoui and dissidents from Al-Qaeda in the Islamic Maghreb pledged allegiance to IS creating the group known as the Islamic State in the Greater Sahara. The group operates in Mali, Niger, and Burkina Faso
- The City of Monotheism and Monotheists group, operating in the Democratic Republic of the Congo, has pledged allegiance to IS.
- The "Lions of the Caliphate in the Maghreb Al Aqsa", operating in Morocco, has pledged allegiance to IS.

=== Child soldiers ===
IS is reported to employ child soldiers, known as "Cubs of the Caliphate", for both combat and propaganda purposes.

== Weapons ==
=== Conventional weapons ===
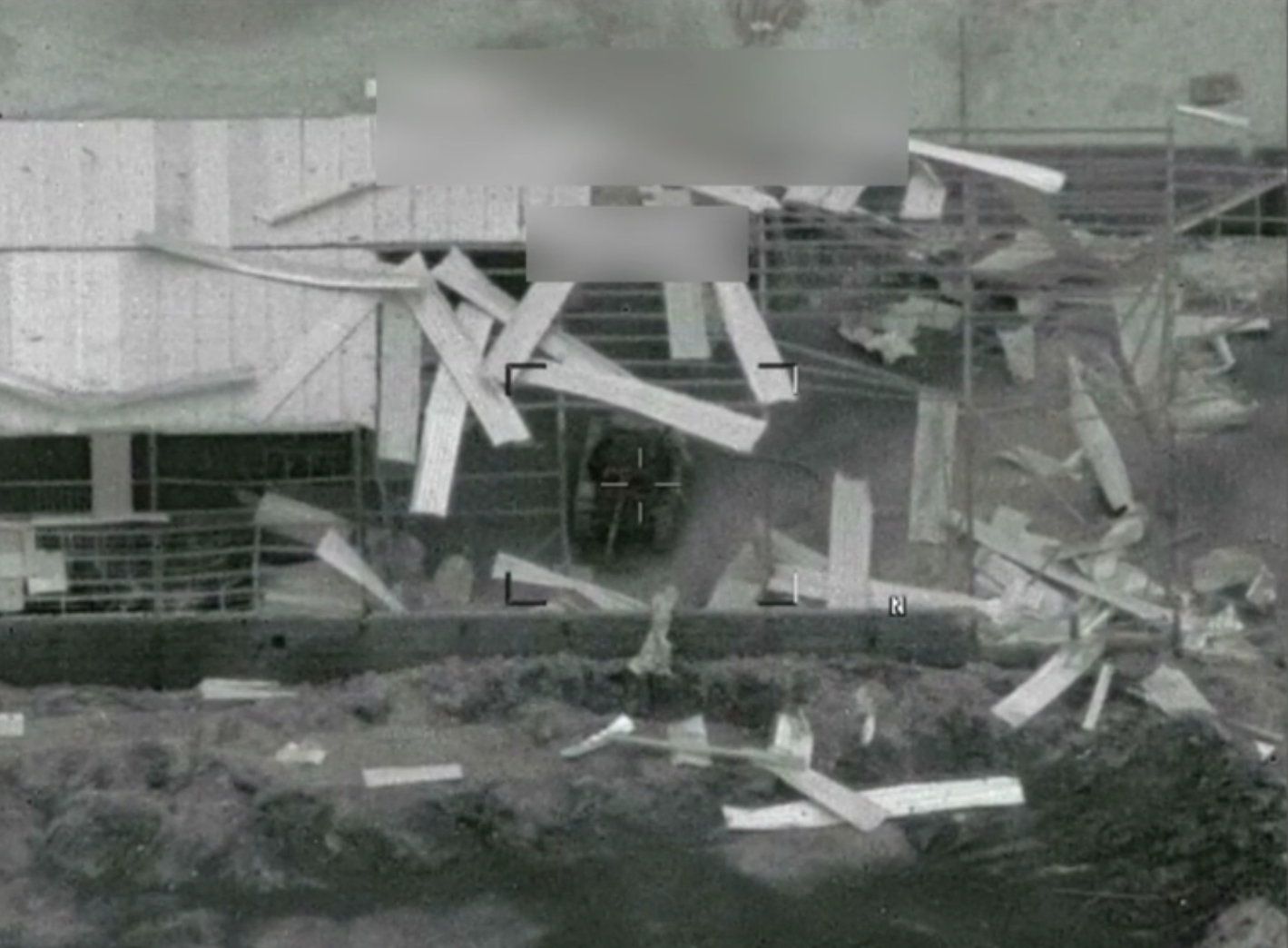
An IS tank during the Palmyra offensive (2017).

The most common weapons used against US and other Coalition forces during the Iraq insurgency were those taken from Saddam Hussein's weapon stockpiles around the country. These included AKM variant assault rifles, PK machine guns and RPG-7s. IS has been able to strengthen its military capability by capturing large quantities and varieties of weaponry during the Syrian Civil War and the post-withdrawal Iraqi insurgency. These weapons seizures have improved the group's capacity to carry out successful subsequent operations and obtain more equipment. Weaponry that IS has reportedly captured and employed include SA-7 and Stinger surface-to-air missiles, M79 Osa, HJ-8 and AT-4 Spigot anti-tank weapons, Type 59 field guns and M198 howitzers, Humvees, T-54/55, T-72, and M1 Abrams main battle tanks, M1117 armoured cars, truck-mounted DShK guns, ZU-23-2 anti-aircraft guns, BM-21 Grad multiple rocket launchers, and at least one Scud missile.

IS shot down an Iraqi helicopter in October 2014, and claims to have shot down "several other" helicopters in 2014. Observers fear that they have "advanced surface-to-air missile systems" such as the Chinese-made FN-6, which are thought to have been provided to Syrian rebels by Qatar and/or Saudi Arabia, and purchased or captured by IS.

=== Aircraft ===
IS also captured many inoperable fighter aircraft after capturing the Syrian airbase of Al-Tabqa. The Syrian Observatory for Human Rights reported in October 2014 that former Iraqi pilots were training IS militants to fly captured Syrian jets. Witnesses reported that MiG-21 and MiG-23 jets were flying over al-Jarrah military airport, but the US Central Command said it was not aware of flights by IS-operated aircraft in Syria or elsewhere. On 21 October, the Syrian Air Force claimed that it had shot down two of these aircraft over al-Jarrah air base while they were landing.

=== Non-conventional ===
An IS car bomb in action during the Siege of Menagh Air Base.

IS has a long history of using truck and car bombs, suicide bombers, and improvised explosive devices. It has become especially adept at the construction and use of truck and car bombs, most notably quite sophisticated models which were fitted with armour, machine guns, and/or firing ports. These are mixtures of car bombs and technicals ("suicide bomber technical") that can approach heavily defended targets, suppressing the enemy while being protected from small-arms fire. Sometimes, IS even used armoured personnel carriers as chassis for car bombs, or fitted them with unguided rockets to clear the path to the intended target.

IS captured nuclear materials from the University of Mosul in July 2014. In a letter to UN Secretary-General Ban Ki-moon, Iraq's UN Ambassador Mohamed Ali Alhakim said that the materials had been kept at the university and "can be used in manufacturing weapons of mass destruction". Nuclear experts regarded the threat as insignificant. The International Atomic Energy Agency said that the seized materials were "low grade and would not present a significant safety, security or nuclear proliferation risk".

==== Chemical weapons ====
Reports suggested that IS captured Saddam-era chemical weapons from an Iraqi military base, and the group also forcibly enlisted the aid of scientists living in its territories to produce their own chemical weapons. IS managed to produce its own mustard gas, and employed it on battlefields in Iraq and Syria. According to one scientist involved in the project, the main value of the mustard gas to IS was not its impact on actual combat, but its effect in psychological warfare. The production of chemical weapons slowed greatly from early 2016, however, as the United States and the Iraqi government targeted production facilities and killed or captured the leaders of the programme. Regardless, it is generally believed that IS remains in possession of hidden data and equipment to restart the production of chemical weapons in the future.

IS deployed mustard gas and chlorine gas against forces of the Iraqi government, the Syrian government and the Syrian opposition, as well as unidentified chemical weapons against the Syrian Democratic Forces. According to the US military, IS used the chemical weapons effectively on a tactical level, but never managed to employ them in a way that impacted the larger strategic situation. The group produced not enough chemical weapons, being hampered not just by airstrikes and raids, but also lack of skilled personnel and equipment.

== See also ==
- Al-Qaeda
- Military equipment of IS
- List of armed groups in the Syrian Civil War
- Human rights violations during the Syrian Civil War
