= United States intervention in Libya (2015–2019) =

Military operation conducted by the United States

- Part of the International campaign against ISIL, Second Libyan Civil War, Operation Inherent Resolve and the war on terror
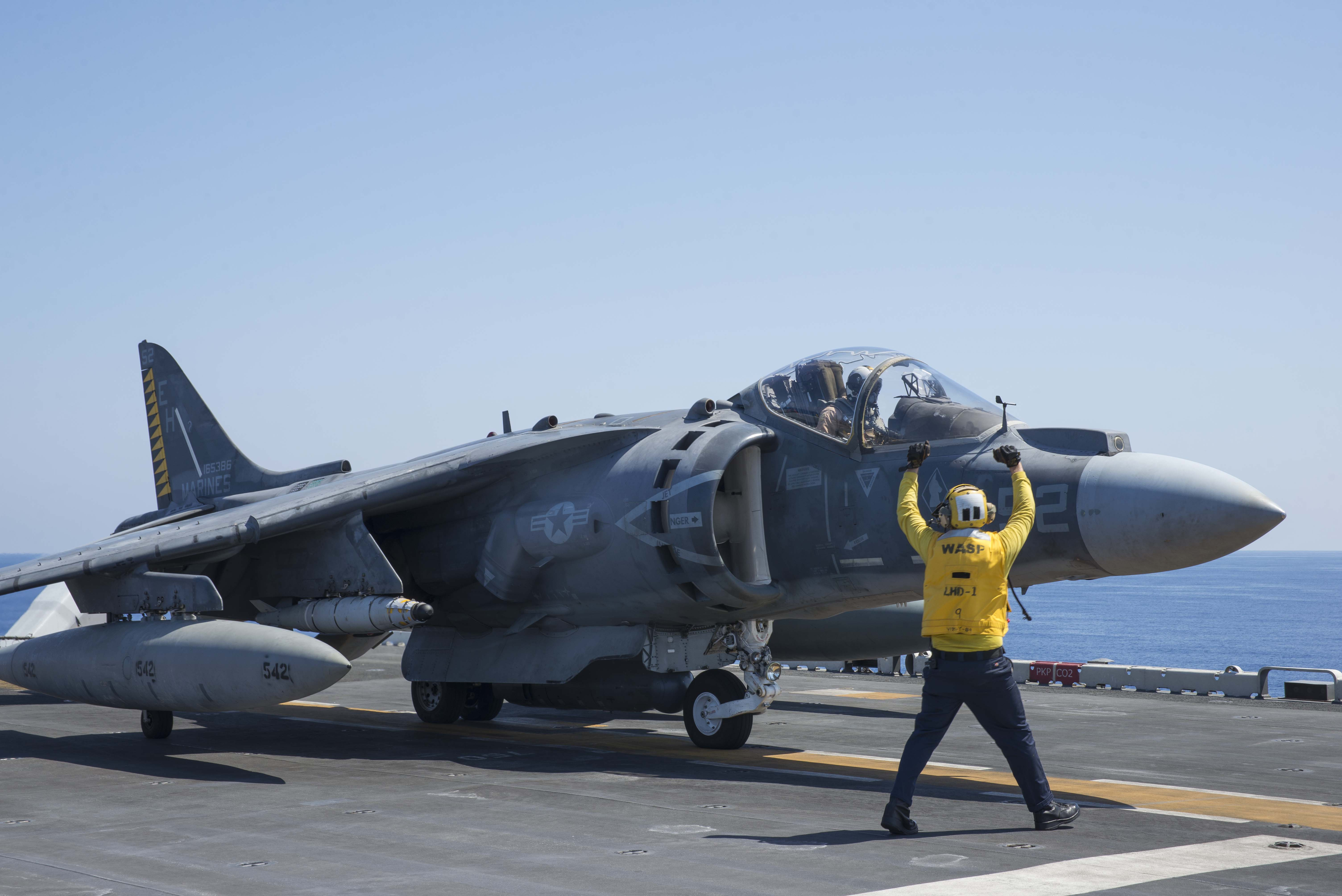
- An AV-8B Harrier assigned to the 22nd MEU aboard USS Wasp taking part in Operation Odyssey Lightning on 11 August 2016.
Date	13 November 2015 – 29 September 2019 (3 years, 10 months, 2 weeks and 2 days)
Location	Libya
Result	American allied victory

Belligerents
United States: U.S. Air Force; U.S. Navy; U.S. Marine Corps; U.S. Special Operations Forces; Libya: Government of National Accord; United Kingdom: SAS; SBS; France: DGSE; Commandos Marine; Jordan	ISIL in Libya: Wilayah al-Tarabulus; Wilayah al-Fizan; Wilayah Barqah; Al-Qaeda in the Islamic Maghreb

Commanders and leaders
Donald Trump (until 2019); Barack Obama (until 2017); Fayez al-Sarraj; Al-Mahdi Al-Barghathi (until 2018)	Abu Nabil al-Anbari †; Abdul Qader al-Najdi; Abu Hudhayfah al-Muhajir

Strength
Unknown	10,000+ militants (in 2016)

Casualties and losses
1 killed (non-combat)	1,552 fighters killed
- 637–930 civilians killed

From November 2015 to 2019, the United States and allies carried out a large series of both airstrikes and drone strikes to intervene in Libya during the country's ongoing civil war that erupted following the 2011 overthrow of Muammar Gaddafi. The intervention was conducted in support of the Tripoli-based Government of National Accord and primarily targeted the ISIL presence in the region, which had exploited Libya's political fragmentation and security vacuum to establish a significant foothold in the country. By 2019, the ISIL branch had been largely driven from holding Libyan territory, and US strikes ceased.

== Military action against ISIL ==
On 13 November 2015, the United States launched an airstrike in Derna, Libya. Two U.S. F-15E fighter jets targeted senior ISIL leader Abu Nabil al-Anbari in the airstrike, who was the top ISIL commander in Libya. In January 2016, ISIL's Libyan faction confirmed Abu Nabil's death in a eulogy to him.

Obama Administration officials were weighing a new campaign plan for Libya that would deepen the United States' military and diplomatic involvement, on yet another front against ISIL. The United States and its allies are increasing reconnaissance flights and intelligence collecting there—and even preparing for possible airstrikes and raids, according to senior American officials. Special Operations forces met with various Libyan groups near the end of 2016 to vet them for possible action against ISIL.

On 19 February 2016, US warplanes carried out an airstrike on multiple ISIL targets in Libya, hitting an ISIL training camp and a senior extremist leader, the training camp was near Sabratha, Libya, 60 people were present at the camp at the time of the strike, more than 40 people were killed with more wounded, some critically, On 14 February 2016, a U.N.-designated council presented a new 18-member Libyan cabinet in the Moroccan city of Skhirat, weeks after an earlier lineup was rejected. The internationally recognized parliament has to endorse the new unity cabinet. If approved, the new unity government could eventually seek international military intervention against ISIL extremists who have taken advantage of the country's political vacuum since 2014.

On 1 August 2016, U.S. crewed and uncrewed aircraft carried out airstrikes on ISIL targets in Libya, responding to the U.N.-backed government's request to help push the militants from their former stronghold of Sirte (where several hundred ISIL fighters remained), in what U.S. officials described as the start of a sustained campaign against the extremist group in the city. President Barack Obama authorized the airstrikes after a recommendation by U.S. Secretary of Defense Ash Carter; the strikes hit an ISIL tank and two vehicles that posed a threat to forces aligned with Libyan GNA (Government of National Accord). This was the third U.S. air strike against ISIL militants in Libya, but this time U.S. officials said it marked the start of a sustained air campaign rather than another isolated strike, U.S. airstrikes would continue to target ISIL in Sirte in order to enable the GNA to make a decisive, strategic advance. United States Africa Command (AFRICOM) oversaw the US effort, which was known as Operation Odyssey Lightning. AV-8B Harrier IIs assigned to the 22nd Marine Expeditionary Unit (22nd MEU) flying off USS Wasp conducted the airstrikes and uncrewed aircraft launched from undisclosed locations. Airstrikes continued, on 2 August, airstrikes hit a rocket launcher, an excavator and a pickup truck with a mounted recoilless rifle and on 3 August airstrikes struck a pickup truck with a mounted recoilless rifle; by 9 August the U.S. conducted 28 strikes against ISIL in Libya, with more than half of the strikes being conducted from uncrewed aircraft. By 16 August, U.S. airstrikes hit an ISIL vehicle and 4 militant positions in Sirte, bringing the number of U.S. airstrikes in Libya to 48. On 17 August, U.S. Africa Command officials announced on 16 August airstrikes on ISIL targets in Sirte struck 7 enemy fighting positions, 4 vehicle-borne bombs, 1 pickup truck with a mounted recoilless rifle, 12 enemy fighting positions and 1 command-and-control vehicle, bringing the total number of airstrikes in support of Operation Odyssey Lightning to 57. On 22 August, Stars and Stripes reported that U.S. Marine AH-1W SuperCobra helicopters participated in strikes against ISIL militants in Sirte on 20 and 21 August; a small detachment of U.S. special forces in Sirte provided most of the targeting information for the airstrikes which were then relayed to U.S. forces through Libyan government troops. On 31 August, Stars and Stripes reported that the U.S. military conducted 104 airstrikes against ISIL targets in Libya in August.

On 22 September, the pace of U.S. airstrikes against ISIL militants in Libya slowed in September as the number of insurgents holed up in a hard-to-target section of Sirte had shrunk, (the U.S. conducted 50 airstrikes against ISIL targets, compared with 108 in August) with about 200 militants remaining. On 28 September, Fox News reported that as of 26 September, U.S. Marine Corps Harrier jets and attack helicopters as well as drones conducted 175 airstrikes against ISIL in Libya, according to the U.S. military's Africa Command. According to a U.S. official the number of ISIL fighters in Sirte was estimated to be "under 100" and that "ISIS is only in three neighborhoods."

On 2 October, the U.S. conducted 20 airstrikes (bringing the total number of strikes to 201) in Libya: knocking out a command and control facility, nearly 70 ISIL fighting positions and several other sites in what was the heaviest day of bombing since the operation began, according to U.S. Africa Command data. The strikes were in support of an offensive by ground forces aligned with the internationally backed Libyan government. On 11 October, the U.S. conducted 51 airstrikes against ISIL targets in Libya, particularly in and around Sirte, between 7 and 10 October, marking it as some of the heaviest bombing since the start of the operation; bringing the total number of U.S. airstrikes in Libya to 261. On 17 October, Fox News reported that US airstrikes against ISIL in Libya doubled in less than a month (bringing the number of airstrikes up to 324). On 21 October 2016, USS San Antonio deployed to the Mediterranean Sea as part of Operation Odyssey Lightning to replace the USS Wasp in its role against ISIL. San Antonio carried UH-1Y Hueys and AH-1W Cobras from the 22nd MEU's Aviation Combat Unit, VMM-264; Marine Harrier fighters were part of the operation aboard Wasp, however San Antonio did not host fighter jets.

On 4 November 2016, Fox News reported that the U.S. military ended its bombing campaign against ISIL in Sirte after three months of round-the-clock airstrikes the U.S. military conducted a total of 367 airstrikes since 1 August 2016. According to officials, no American airstrikes took place since 31 October; units taking part in the operation received orders on 1 November from AFRICOM to end offensive and collective self-defense airstrikes. A senior defense official said the U.S. military would "continue to provide military support to the GNA...ISIL-held territory in Sirte is down to a few hundred square meters. We'll continue to discuss with the GNA leadership what additional support they may need moving forward including air strikes."

Sirte was liberated by GNA forces in early December. On 20 December 2016, AFRICOM said that it carried out 495 airstrikes against militant vehicles and positions in the former ISIL stronghold of Sirte. Operation Odyssey Lightning concluded on 19 December, following an announcement from the Libyan government of the end of offensive military operations in Sirte.

On 18 January 2017, two United States Air Force B-2 bombers and one Reaper drone struck two ISIL camps 28 miles (45 km) south of Sirte, killing more than 80 ISIL militants. The two bombers launched from Whiteman Air Force Base in Missouri, flying round-trip for 34 hours to conduct the strikes. The B-2s dropped over 100 GPS-guided bombs on the two camps, after which a Reaper drone from Naval Air Station Sigonella in Sicily surveyed the area. One official called the airstrikes "a huge success," with more than 80 ISIL fighters killed, one counter-terrorism official told ABC News there were "zero survivors" at the camps. Many of the ISIL fighters in the camps had fled Sirte during the battle, according to another official; Pentagon press secretary Peter Cook said in a statement ISIL fighters had fled to the remote desert camps "in order to reorganize and they posed a security threat to Libya, the region, and U.S. national interests". The militants were carrying weapons, wearing tactical vests and standing in formation. The airstrikes were authorized by President Obama and were carried out in coordination with GNA; they were considered to be an extension of Operation Odyssey Lightning. US Defense Secretary Ash Carter said those targeted were "actively planning" attacks in Europe. NBC News later reported that the number of ISIL fighters killed was revised upward to 90; a U.S. defense official said that "This was the largest remaining ISIS presence in Libya," and that "They have been largely marginalised but I am hesitant to say they've been completely eliminated in Libya."

On 22 September 2017, the U.S. conducted six airstrikes with unmanned aircraft on an ISIL camp 150 miles (240 km) southeast of Sirte, killing 17 ISIL militants and destroying three vehicles. AFRICOM stated the strikes took place "In coordination with Libya's Government of National Accord and aligned forces" and that "The camp was used by ISIS to move fighters in and out of the country; stockpile weapons and equipment; and to plot and conduct attacks". The strikes marked the first time airstrikes had been carried out in the country under the Donald Trump administration.

=== Other actions ===
The U.S. military has been closely monitoring ISIL movements in Libya, and small teams of U.S. military personnel has moved in and out of the country over a period of months. British, French, Italian and Jordanian special forces as well as the British Royal Air Force also have been in Libya helping with aerial surveillance, mapping and intelligence gathering in several cities, including Benghazi in the east and Zintan in the west, according to two Libyan military officials who were coordinating with them. British and American special forces have also been carrying out intelligence-gathering operations around Sirte.

Since the beginning of 2016, British Special forces have been escorting teams of MI6 agents to meet with Libyan officials and organise the supplying weapons and training to the Libyan army and to militias fighting against ISIL. On 27 February 2016, The Telegraph reported that British special forces had deployed alongside its U.S. counterparts in the city of Misrata to stop ISIL from advancing further, their main role being to give tactical training to local militias and to build an army to fight ISIL. In May 2016, it was reported that British special forces had engaged in frontline combat against ISIL in Libya; in particular they destroyed two ISIL suicide vehicles that were targeting Libyan fighters. On 12 May, at the Shaddadah Bridge, 50 miles (80 km) south of Misrata, the approach of a suicide vehicle sent Libyan forces fleeing in panic, British special forces intervened and destroyed the vehicle with a missile. An estimated dozen U.S. special forces operated out of a base near Misrata and were in action near Tripoli.

In a plan disclosed in late 2015, Britain was to offer the Libyan government 1,000 troops as part of a 5,000-strong combined with Italy, to train and equip the Libyan forces rather than take part in frontline fighting. In addition, British defence minister Michael Fallon announced that Britain was sending 20 troops from the 4th Infantry Brigade to Tunisia to help prevent ISIL fighters from moving into the country from Libya.

In June 2016, it was reported that ISIL militants were retreating from Sirte and some fighters reportedly cutting off their beards and long hair to blend in with civilians as militia fighters allied to the unity government pushed into the city in tanks and armed trucks. The militias, mostly from Misrata, are allied to and are the main fighting force for the U.N.-brokered unity government installed in Tripoli the previous year. On 11 June, the BBC reported that Libyan forces claim they have retaken control of part of Sirte after fierce fighting with militants from ISIL. In July 2016, UN Secretary-General Ban Ki-moon said ISIL fighters in Libya are facing the "distinct possibility" of defeat in their last stronghold and are likely to scatter elsewhere in the country and the region; At the beginning of 2016, ISIL was believed to have more than 5,000 fighters in Libya, by August 2016, estimating there could be less than 1,000 left, by 9 August, only 350 ISIL fighters remained in Sirte. U.S. and British special forces were involved in the battle for Sirte: U.S. troops were operating out of a joint operations center on the city's outskirts, their role was limited to supporting forces unity government forces, providing direct, on-the-ground support. On 22 September, Stars and Stripes reported that since the start of the battle to retake Sirte by Libyan forces, many ISIL members fled the city, "looking to hide among the population, relocate to other Libyan towns or attempting to leave Libya altogether."

== Derna airstrike ==
On 15 November 2015, the US launched an airstrike in Derna, Libya killing senior ISIL leader Abu Nabil al-Anbari. Abu Nabil formerly led operations in Iraq alongside al-Qaeda from 2004 to 2010. This marked the first time United States military action was used against ISIL outside of Syria and Iraq. This was concurrent to the Battle of Derna.

== February 2016 air raid ==
On 19 February 2016, the United States conducted a large series of bombings in Sabratha. The United States said that ISIL training camps were the target. The strike killed Noureddine Chouchane, a Tunisian resident who was blamed for having links to the 2015 Sousse attacks in Tunisia. The Pentagon later released a statement saying the intention was to weaken the chances of ISIL continuing the construction of new training camps and the ability to recruit new members.

== Operation Odyssey Lightning ==
On 2 August 2016 The Pentagon released a statement that the United States would begin to collaborate with Libya's Government of National Accord (GNA) in an effort to free the city of Sirte from ISIL fighters that had captured the city in March 2015. The United States assured that this was done under the request of the Libyan government and that it was necessary to enable the Libyan forces to have strategic advantages for the offensive. The operations began a day before the announcement with precision airstrikes on Sirte.

The United States continued airstrikes and military support from August to December.

Originally the Libyan forces were to lead the offensive, while support provided by U.S. AV-8B Harrier jets and AH-1W Super Cobra attack helicopters struck militant strongholds inside the city. However, according to American field commanders, the GNA forces became "overwhelmed" attempting to enter Sirte and had become desperately in need of heavier support. The U.S. granted fighter jets permission to use defensive weapon strikes against militants.

On 6 December 2016, Libyan forces had officially liberated the city of Sirte.

== January 2017 airstrikes ==
On 1–2 January 2017, the US attacked multiple ISIL training camps 25 miles southwest of Sirte. The strikes were intended to target senior members and external plotters.

== Timeline of operations ==
=== 2015 ===
- 13 November – U.S. airstrike in Derna kills senior ISIL leader Abu Nabil al-Anbari.

=== 2016 ===
- 19 February – 43–49 ISIL fighters killed in airstrikes.

Beginning of Operation Odyssey Lightning

- 1 August – U.S. airstrike targets a T-72 tank, T-55 tank, two military support vehicles, and two pieces of heavy engineering equipment. An enemy position was also hit.
- 2 August – The U.S. strikes a pick up truck destroying a mounted recoilless rifle as well as heavy engineering equipment.
- 3 August – U.S. strikes one pickup truck with mounted recoilless rifle.
- 4–2 August trucks are hit in an air strike.
- 6–2 August enemy fighting positions are targeted.
- 7–3 August resupply trucks hit.
- 8–11 August fighting positions targeted as well as one truck.
- 9 August – One pick up truck targeted.
- 10–5 August supply trucks including one rigged with an improvised explosive device, as well as 10 enemy fighting positions.
- 11–2 August enemy vehicles and 5 fighting positions hit.
- 13 August – One enemy vehicle destroyed.
- 14–4 August enemy positions targeted.
- 15–4 August enemy positions targeted as well as one supply truck.
- 16–6 August vehicles hit including 4 mounted with improvised explosive devices (IED) as well as 7 fighting positions.
- 17–13 August fighting positions hit as well as an IED vehicle.
- 18–3 August fighting positions, a supply truck and an IED vehicle hit.
- 19–2 August supply trucks and 2 fighting positions.
- 20–15 August enemy positions targeted.
- 21–8 August enemy positions targeted.
- 22–10 August enemy positions as well as a supply truck targeted.
- 23–1 August enemy fighting position hit.
- 24–11 August enemy positions targeted including an IED vehicle.
- 26–2 August enemy positions hit.
- 27 August – One IED vehicle as well as a suspected IED position targeted.
- 28–6 August enemy positions as well as an IED vehicle hit.
- 29–16 August enemy positions as well as an IED vehicle hit.
- 30–5 August enemy positions as well as one IED vehicle hit.
- 31–5 August enemy positions, an IED vehicle and a weapons cache destroyed.
- 1–9 September enemy positions hit.
- 2–1 September enemy position hit.
- 3–11 September enemy positions hit.
- 4–4 September enemy positions hit.
- 5–5 September enemy positions as well as an IED vehicle destroyed.
- 6–6 September enemy positions hit.
- 7–2 September enemy positions as well as an IED vehicle destroyed.
- 8–3 September enemy positions hit.
- 9–2 September enemy positions as well as IED vehicle destroyed.
- 10–9 September enemy positions as well as a resupply vehicle destroyed.
- 11–9 September enemy positions hit.
- 12–3 September enemy positions as well as 2 vehicles targeted.
- 13 September – One enemy position hit.
- 14–6 September enemy positions as well as an IED vehicle hit.
- 15 September – IED vehicle destroyed.
- 18–9 September enemy positions hit.
- 20–7 September fighting positions hit.
- 21–3 September trucks hit including an IED rigged vehicle.
- 22–8 September enemy positions and an IED vehicle destroyed.
- 23–4 September enemy targets hit.
- 24 September – One resupply zone neutralized.
- 28 September – Resupply zone neutralized.
- 29 September – Armored truck destroyed.
- 30–7 September fighting positions as well as an IED vehicle.
- 1–6 October enemy positions hit.
- 2 October – 69 enemy positions, a command and control facility, an operations facility, and 2 IED vehicles neutralized.
- 3–27 October enemy positions hit.
- 4–3 October IED vehicles targeted.
- 5–11 October enemy positions.
- 7–17 October enemy positions and a resupply route targeted.
- 8 October – 60 enemy positions hit.
- 9 October – 51 enemy positions hit.
- 10–23 October enemy positions hit.
- 11–22 October enemy positions hit.
- 12–28 October enemy positions hit.
- 13–16 October enemy positions hit.
- 14 October – 60 enemy positions hit.
- 15–18 October enemy positions hit.
- 16–11 October enemy positions as well as an IED vehicle hit.
- 17–2 October enemy positions hit.
- 18–10 October enemy fighting positions hit.
- 21–2 October enemy positions and 2 IED vehicles hit.
- 22 October – One enemy fighting position.
- 23–3 October enemy fighting positions hit.
- 24–5 October enemy positions hit.
- 25–5 October IED vehicles destroyed.
- 26–5 October IED vehicles destroyed.
- 31 October— 33 enemy positions, one storage facility, and 2 IED vehicles targeted.
- 8–9 November enemy positions hit.
- 10–14 November enemy positions and one IED vehicle hit.
- 11–2 November IED vehicles destroyed.
- 12–14 November enemy fighting positions hit.
- 13–17 November enemy positions hit.
- 15–4 November enemy positions hit.
- 18 November – One enemy position hit.
- 19–6 November enemy positions hit.
- 21 November – 47 enemy positions hit.
- 22–29 November enemy positions hit.
- 23–14 November enemy positions hit.
- 24–24 November enemy positions hit.
- 25–14 November enemy positions hit.
- 26–30 November enemy positions hit.
- 27–24 November enemy positions hit.
- 28–14 November enemy positions hit.
- 29–8 November enemy positions hit.
- 30–14 November enemy positions hit.
- 1–3 December enemy positions hit.
- 2–22 December enemy positions hit.
- 3 December – 49 enemy positions hit.
- 5–7 December enemy fighting positions hit.

End of the Operation Odyssey Lightning

=== 2017 ===
- 18–19 January – US B-2 bombers target and neutralize 80–90 ISIL affiliates.
- 22– September strikes on an ISIL camp killing over 17 militants and destroying 3 vehicles.
- 26 September – Multiple ISIL militants targeted during precision strikes.
- 17 November – One airstrike on ISIL affiliates.
- 19–2 November airstrikes near Fuqaha.

=== 2018 ===
- 30 March – First airstrike conducted against AQIM. The strike kills "two al Qaeda terrorists, including Musa Abu Dawud, a high ranking al-Qa'ida in the Lands of the Islamic Maghreb (AQIM) official."

=== 2019 ===
- 7 April – Officials from AFRICOM announced that it had temporarily withdrawn some of its ground forces from Libya following the Libyan National Army Field Marshal Khalifa Haftar's surprise offensive into Tripoli. Officials did not specify how many U.S. troops were withdrawn, how many remained, where they were relocated to, or when they intend to return, but said it would "continue to monitor conditions on the ground" and "assess the feasibility for renewed US military presence as appropriate."
- 19 September- a Drone strike killed 8 Islamic State militants in town of Murzuq.
- 24 September - a Drone strike killed 11 Islamic State Militants near town of Murzuq.
- 26 September- a Drone strike killed 17 Islamic State militants in south Libya.
- 29 September- a Drone strike killed 7 Islamic State militants in south Libya. This was the last known U.S. drone strike in the country.

== See also ==
- Libyan crisis
- 2011 military intervention in Libya
- Factional violence in Libya (2011–2014)
- Second Libyan Civil War
- War against the Islamic State
- Spillover of the Syrian Civil War
- Drone strikes in Pakistan, Afghanistan, Yemen, and Somalia
