= Abu Muhannad al-Suwaydawi =

Iraqi ISIL commander (1965–2014)

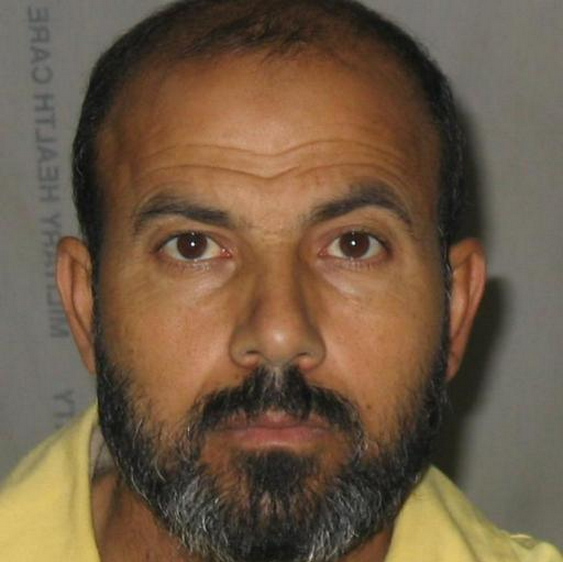
- Born: Adnan Latif Hamid al-Suwaydawi al-Dulaymi; 1965; Al-Khalidiya, Iraq
- Died: 8 November 2014 (aged 48–49) Mosul, Nineveh Governorate, Iraq
- Allegiance: Baathist Iraq (1986–2003); Jama'at al-Tawhid wal-Jihad (2003–2004); Al-Qaeda (2004–2013); Al-Qaeda in Iraq (2004–2006); Islamic State of Iraq (2006–2013); Islamic State of Iraq and the Levant (2013–2014); Iraqi Army (1986–2003); Military of ISIL (8 April 2013 – 8 November 2014)
- Rank: Colonel (until 2003); ISIL Wali (Governor) of Anbar (January 2014 – 8 November 2014); ISIL Military Chief (4 June 2014 – 8 November 2014)
- Conflicts: Iran–Iraq War; Gulf War; 2003 invasion of Iraq; Iraqi insurgency (2011–2013); Syrian civil war; Battle of Aleppo (2012–2016); Inter-rebel conflict during the Syrian civil war; War against the Islamic State

Adnan Latif Hamid al-Suwaydawi al-Dulaymi (Arabic: عدنان لطيف حامد السويداوي الدليمي, ‘Adnān Laṭīf Ḥāmid as-Suwaydāwī al-Dulaymī) (1965 – 8 November 2014), also known by his noms de guerre Abu Muhannad al-Suwaydawi, Abu Abdul Salem, and Haji Dawūd was a top commander in the Islamic State of Iraq and the Levant (ISIL) and the former head of its Military Council.

== Biography ==
Despite his senior position within the ISIL hierarchy, very little is known about al-Iraqi. He has been referred to as a "shadowy persona". Al-Suwaydawi was a member of the Al-bu Swda clan of the Dulaim, the largest tribe in Iraq's Al Anbar Governorate. Al-Suwaydawi served under the Ba'athist regime of Saddam Hussein as a lieutenant colonel in the Iraqi Army. He also operated in Iraq's Air Defense Intelligence. According to Ahmed al-Dulaimi, the governor of Al Anbar Governorate, al-Suwaydawi graduated from the same military academy as future senior ISIL leaders Haji Bakr and Abu Abdulrahman al-Bilawi.

An ISIL biography of Abu Muhannad al-Suwaydawi describes him as being "especially close to Abu Musab al-Zarqawi and Abu Abdulrahman al-Bilawi and says, "He and Abu Abdulrahman al-Bilawi were friends both in childhood and jihad". According to the biography, Abu Muhannad was present at both the First Battle of Fallujah and the Second Battle of Fallujah during the occupation of Iraq. He was also responsible for planning the 2013 Abu Ghraib prison break. In 2007, al-Suwaydawi was detained by U.S. forces in Iraq at Camp Bucca. Following the deaths of Haji Bakr and al-Bilawi in 2014, al-Suwaydawi reportedly succeeded them as head of ISIL's military council.

=== Death ===
In November 2014, there were media reports that al-Iraqi had been killed in an Iraqi airstrike that reportedly also injured Abu Bakr al-Baghdadi, however this was not confirmed at the time. In May 2015, ISIL carried out a wide-scale assault on Ramadi, capturing the city centre. The assault was named after al-Suwaydawi, who was described as having been killed in a US-led air strike. Jihadists frequently name their military offensives after fallen leaders. The Daily Beast reported that al-Suwaydawi was succeeded by senior ISIL figure Abu Ali al-Anbari.

In October 2019, an article for the BBC claimed al-Suwaydawi was killed fighting on the front line in Syria by the Syrian Democratic Forces rather than a US airstrike.
