= Zliten truck bombing =

2016 Libyan militant attack

- Part of the Libyan civil war (2014–2020)
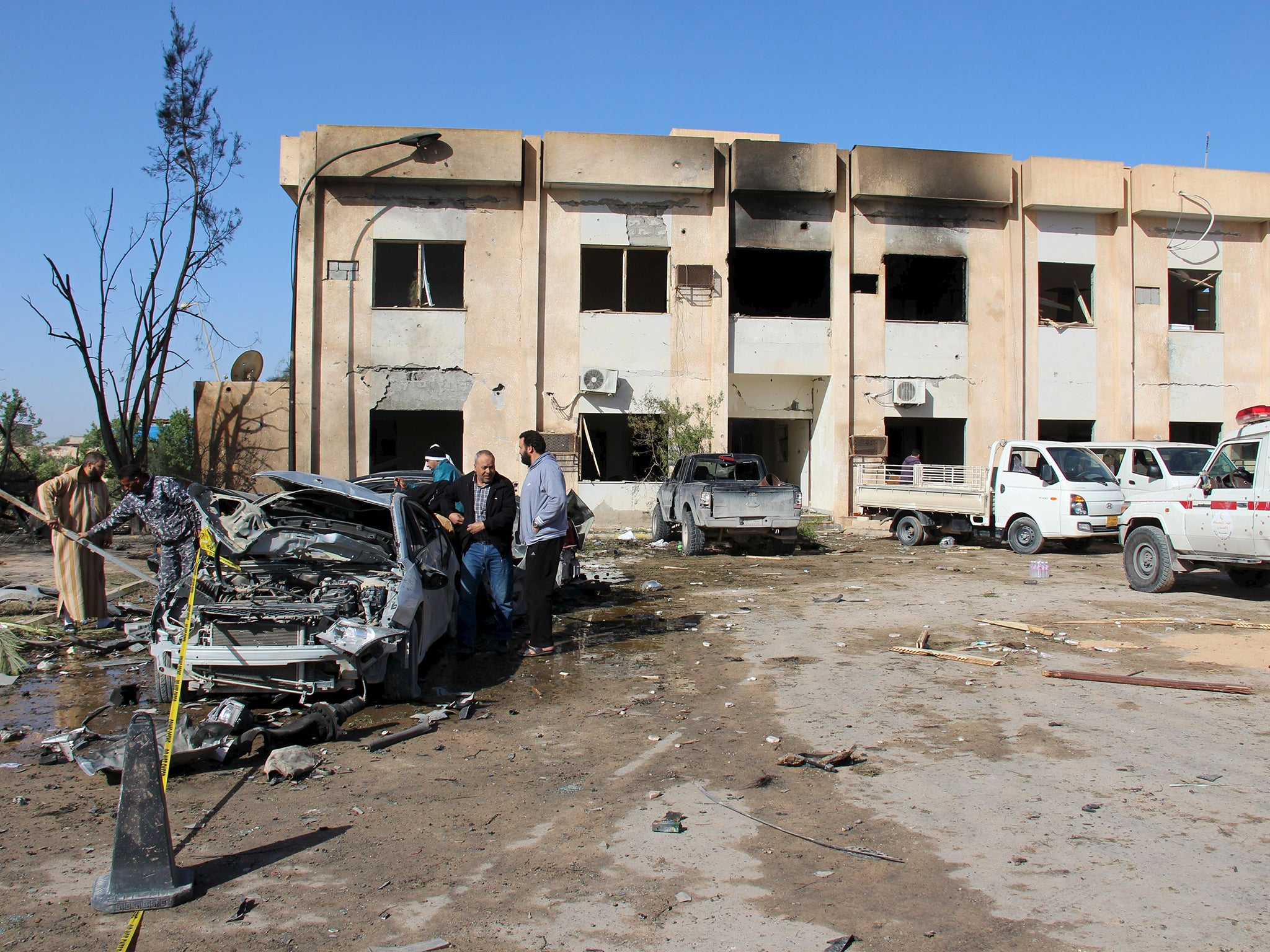

- Zliten (Libya)
- Location: 32°27′50″N 14°34′21″E; Zliten, Murqub District, Libya
- Date: 7 January 2016
- Target: Policemen
- Attack type: Suicide truck bombing
- Weapon: Truck bombs
- Deaths: 60+
- Injuries: 200+
- Perpetrator: Wilayat al-Barqa (ISIL)
- Assailant: Abu al-Abbas al-Muhajir

The Zliten truck bombing occurred on 7 January 2016, when Islamist militants detonated a truck bomb at the police training camp al-Jahfal in the coastal town of Zliten, Libya. Libyan authorities said at least 60 policemen were killed and over 200 wounded. Concrete buildings inside the compound were charred from the blast and their windows blown out; nearby cars were turned into twisted metal wrecks. The head of the United Nations Support Mission in Libya, Martin Kobler, said the blast was a suicide attack.

Wilayat al-Barqah, a province of Islamic State of Iraq and the Levant in Libya, claimed responsibility for the attack. They said the bomber was Abu al-Abbas al-Muhajir, who detonated his explosive-laden truck among the Libyan border police at the base.

This incident was the deadliest militant attack since the 2011 Libyan revolution, followed by Al Qubbah bombings which killed 40 people in February 2015.

== Reaction ==
=== Libya ===
- Deputy defence minister for the Tripoli-based New General National Congress, Mohammad Bashir al-Naas, vowed to avenge the attack. "The perpetrator is not known but he is a coward. He kills our sons from the shadows. We must avenge them and do everything possible to protect them," Naas told a news conference.

=== International ===
- United Nations: Head of the United Nations Support Mission in Libya, Martin Kobler, called for unity in the wake of the attack, saying implementing the political agreement was crucial. Kobler wrote on Twitter: "I condemn in the strongest terms today's deadly suicide attack in Zliten, call on all Libyans to urgently unite in fight against terrorism".
- Egypt: In an official press release, the foreign ministry of Egypt said that the "despicable acts of terrorism" in the city of Zliten affirm once again the urgency of supporting the legitimate security apparatuses in Libya, including the Libya National Army.
- Turkey: foreign ministry of Turkey said in a written statement: "We strongly condemn the deadly terrorist attack that targeted a police training center in Libya's Zliten city", "This atrocious attack has demonstrated once again the necessity of an effective fight against terror in Libya as well as the prompt establishment of national security and stability."

== See also ==
- Second Libyan Civil War
- List of terrorist incidents, January–June 2016
