= Haji Bakr =

ISIL leader (c. 1958/1964 – 2014)

- Born: Samir Abd Muhammad al-Khlifawi ca. 1958–1964; Iraq
- Died: January 2014 (late fifties); Tell Rifaat, Syria
- Military career
- Allegiance: Baathist Iraq (unknown–2003) Jama'at al-Tawhid wal-Jihad (2003–2004); Al-Qaeda (2004–2013): Al-Qaeda in Iraq (2004–2006); Mujahideen Shura Council (January–October 2006); Islamic State of Iraq (2006–2013); Islamic State of Iraq and the Levant (2013–2014)
- Branch: Iraqi Army (until 2003); ISIL military (8 April 2013 – January 2014)
- Rank: Colonel (until 2003); ISIL Military Chief and overall leader of ISIL in Syria (April 2010 – January 2014)
- Nicknames: 'Knight of the Silencers' 'Lord of the Shadows'
- Conflicts: 1991 Iraq War; 2003 Iraq War; Iraqi insurgency Syrian Civil War: Inter-rebel conflict during the Syrian Civil War †

Samir Abd Muhammad al-Khlifawi (Arabic: سمير عبد محمد العبيدي الدليمي; c. 1958-1964 – January 2014), better known by the pseudonym Haji Bakr (Arabic: حجي بكر) and sometimes his kunya Abu Bakr al-Iraqi (Arabic: أبو بكر العراقي), was a senior leader of the militant group Islamic State of Iraq and the Levant (ISIL), heading its Military Council and leading its operations in Syria, prior to his killing by Syrian rebels in January 2014. Previously a Colonel in the Iraqi Intelligence Service, papers found after his death indicated that al-Khlifawi played a key role in devising the plans ISIL used to conquer and administer territory in Syria and Iraq.

== Biography ==
=== During the Ba'ath regime ===
Prior to the 2003 invasion of Iraq and overthrow of Saddam Hussein, al-Khlifawi had been an Iraqi Army colonel who had worked on weapons development and in the intelligence services of Saddam's Air Defense Corps. According to Iraqi journalist Hisham al-Hashimi, whose cousin served with Khlifawi, he was stationed for a period of time at Habbaniya Air Base. Iraqi intelligence says that he joined al-Qaida in Iraq in 2004 and took part in the Iraqi insurgency.

=== After the Invasion of Iraq ===
Arrested by American forces, al-Khlifawi was held in detention in Camp Bucca, alongside many of the men who would form the senior leadership of ISIL, including Abu Muslim al-Turkmani, Abu Abdulrahman al-Bilawi and future leader Abu Bakr al-Baghdadi.

Following his release he became a senior leader in the Islamic State of Iraq (ISI), and led the group's military council following the killing of top commanders Abu Omar al-Baghdadi and Abu Ayyub al-Masri by US Forces in 2010. Al-Khlifawi played an influential role in Abu Bakr al-Baghdadi becoming the next ISI leader, and reportedly organized an internal purge, including scores of assassinations, in order to solidify al-Baghdadi's control of the group.

== Role in Syria ==
The then-ISI took advantage of the 2011 outbreak of Civil War in neighboring Syria to grow their organisation. Al-Khlifawi moved to an unremarkable house in the small Syrian town of Tell Rifaat, just north of Aleppo in late 2012, along with his wife. It was here where he organised the group's takeover of territory in parts of the country using his experience as a former Intelligence Officer. Documents written by al-Khlifawi, and discovered by Syrian rebels in his hideout, showed that the group was following a strategy to initially use intelligence gathering, infiltration of local power bases, and tactical short-term alliances with local power brokers to establish themselves in the area. This would expand to include kidnappings and assassinations of potential threats before the group would seize control of the territory and utilize the already established network of informers in the area to become the base of a governance system in the region.

Al-Khlifawi was killed in early January 2014 in Tell Rifaat during clashes between ISIL and Syrian rebels by members of the Syrian Martyrs' Brigade, who were not aware of his importance. Prior to his death, he had refused to move to a heavily guarded ISIL headquarters near his house because of his addiction to living in the shadows. One of his neighbours betrayed him by saying "A Daesh (ISIL) sheikh lives next door". Soon after, rival Syrian rebel militiamen forced their way into his house and al-Khlifawi fought the attackers back with his AK weapon but he was killed during the gunfights. Following al-Khlifawi's death, Abu Abdulrahman al-Bilawi, another former Iraqi Military officer, took his place in ISIL's Military Council.
