= 2018 National Oil Corporation attack =

Terrorist attack in Tripoli, Libya

- Part of the Libyan civil war (2014–2020)
- Location: Tripoli, Libya
- Date: 10 September 2018
- Attack type: Suicide attack, hostage taking
- Weapons: Assault Rifles and Explosive Belts
- Deaths: 2 National Oil Corporation Security staff and 2 perpetrators
- Injuries: 10 National Oil Corporation Staff
- Victim: Libya's National Oil Corporation
- Perpetrator: Islamic State of Iraq and the Levant: Wilayat Libya

The 2018 National Oil Corporation attack was a terrorist attack that occurred on 10 September 2018, in which at least six gunmen from the Islamic State of Iraq and the Levant in Libya carried out an attack, taking several hostages and killing at least 2 staff members from the National Oil Corporation. During the attack, a shootout occurred with security forces loyal to the Tripoli-based government. An al-Jazeera journalist reported that the gunmen attacked the main gate of the facility, and the attack caused a wave of panic in Tripoli.

== Reactions ==
Italy: Italian Foreign Minister Enzo Milanesi condemned the attack in a phone call to Fayez al-Sarraj, who was Head of the Government of National Accord at the time.

== See also ==
- In Amenas hostage crisis
