= Al Qubbah bombings =

2015 attack in Libya

Coordinates: 32.4600°N 22.1500°E

- Part of Libyan civil war (2014–2020)
- Location: Al Qubbah, Libya
- Date: 20 February 2015
- Attack type: Bombing
- Weapon: Three bombs
- Deaths: 40
- Perpetrator: Islamic State in Libya

The al Qubbah bombings occurred in Al Qubbah, Libya on February 20, 2015.

== Events ==
Operatives loyal to the Islamic State group detonated three bombs in al-Qubbah, targeting a petrol station, a police station, and the home of President of the Libyan House of Representatives since 5 August 2014 (and effectively the country's parliamentary speaker) Aguila Saleh Issa. These attacks reportedly killed at least 40 people. Six Egyptians were identified among the fatalities, whose bodies were repatriated to Egypt via the Sallum border crossing.

ISIL said that the attacks were carried out in retaliation for the February 2015 Egyptian airstrikes in Libya. The Egyptian Air Force had launched strikes following the kidnapping and beheading of 21 Copts in Libya in February 2015.

The U.S. State Department, the Misrata Municipality, and General National Congress (Libya Dawn) condemned the attacks.
