= Abu Nabil al-Anbari =

Libyan Islamist militant leader (1972–2015)

- Born: 1972; Al-Anbar, Iraq
- Died: 13 November 2015 (aged 42–43); Derna, Libya
- Cause of death: Airstrike
- Other names: Abu Nabil al-Anbari, Abul Mughirah al-Qahtani, Abu Yazan al-Humairi, Abu Hamam
- Organization: Islamic State of Iraq and the Levant
- Known for: Former Emir of Islamic State of Iraq and the Levant in Libya

Wissam Najm Abd Zayd al-Zubaydi, better known by his noms de guerre Abu Nabil al-Anbari (Arabic: أبو نبيل الأنباري, romanized: ʾAbū Nabīl al-ʾAnbārī), Abul Mughirah al-Qahtani (Arabic: أبو المغيرة القحطاني, romanized: ʾAbū al-Mughīrah al-Qaḥtānī) was a commander in the Islamic State and the leader of its Libyan branch. Al-Anbari was killed by a US military airstrike on 13 November 2015.

== History ==
Abu Nabil al-Anbari was born in 1972. Following the 2003 invasion of Iraq, He formed a small group in city of Fallujah and took part in the Iraqi insurgency, with his group later joining Jamaat at-Tawhid wal-Jihad and later partaking in the First Battle of Fallujah. During this time, he was a companion of Abu Hamza al-Muhajir. He later traveled to Saudi Arabia on behalf of the group as an envoy to the al-Qaeda, and while he was there, the Second Battle of Fallujah erupted, in which he did not participate in. Upon returning to Iraq following the battle, he was captured by U.S. forces. Abu Nabil spent time in detention in Abu Ghraib prison before being released after a year and a half, upon which he returned to armed militancy. Following his release in 2006, he was appointed as head of security operations in Fallujah under the alias Abu Haqqi. During an assassination attempt against an Iraqi loyalist, he sustained a gunshot wound to his shoulder.

Not long after he was released, he was captured and imprisoned again in 2010. Transferred to Taji Prison facing execution, he used bribes to secure a transfer to Abu Ghraib Prison until he was freed by ISIL in an attack on Abu Ghraib prison and a mass prison break on 21 July 2013. He would later serve as ISIL's "governor" of Salahuddin Governorate, responsible for the group's operations there, including the attack on the city of Samarra. As the governor of Salahuddin Governorate, he was responsible for overseeing the execution of up to 1,700 Shia Iraqi Air Force cadets in the Camp Speicher massacre. In 2014, ISIL's leadership dispatched him from Iraq to Libya as part of a delegation to gather pledges of allegiance to Abu Bakr al-Baghdadi from local militants and lead the nascent ISIL branch in the country.

== Death ==
Al-Anbari was killed in a US airstrike outside of Derna, Libya on 13 November 2015. The Libya Herald reported local claims that al-Anbari had not been killed in the airstrike, however a eulogy to Abu Nabil al-Anbari was published online by a member of ISIL some weeks later. In a statement following the strike, Pentagon press secretary Peter Cook said "Abu Nabil's death will degrade [ISIL's] ability to meet the group's objectives in Libya, including recruiting new members, establishing bases in Libya, and planning external attacks on the United States." He added: "Reporting suggests [he] may also have been the spokesman in the February 2015 Coptic Christian execution video," referring to a video which showed the beheading of 21 Egyptian Copts in Libya after their kidnapping in 2015. His killing was the first military action by the United States against an ISIL target outside of Iraq and Syria while still connected to the organization's core leadership (other militants struck in countries like Nigeria and Afghanistan are not believed by US officials to be directly linked to the Iraq and Syria based leadership).

In January 2016, ISIL confirmed al-Anbari's death and launched a series of attacks and bombings across Libya named "the battle of Abul al-Mughirah al-Qahtani" in his honour. Al-Anbari was succeeded as leader of ISIL in Libya by Abdul Qader al-Najdi.
