= Abu Abdulrahman al-Bilawi =

Iraqi ISIL leader (1971–2014)

- Born: Adnan Ismail Najm Abdullah al-Dulaimi; 1971; Al-Khalidiya, Iraq
- Died: 4 June 2014 (aged 42–43) Near Mosul, Iraq
- Allegiance: Baathist Iraq (1993–2003) Jama'at al-Tawhid wal-Jihad (2003–2004); Al-Qaeda (2004–2006): Al-Qaeda in Iraq (2004–2006); Islamic State of Iraq and the Levant (2013–2014)
- Branch: Iraqi Army (1993–2003); Military of ISIL (8 April 2013 – 4 June 2014)
- Rank: Captain (1993–2003); ISIL Military Chief (January 2014 – 4 June 2014)
- Conflicts: 2003 Iraq War; Iraqi insurgency: Northern Iraq offensive (June 2014); Anbar campaign (2013–14)

Adnan Ismail Najm al-Bilawi Al-Dulaimi (Arabic: عدنان إسماعيل نجم البيلاوي الدليمي 1971 – 4 June 2014), better known by the nom de guerre Abu Abdulrahman al-Bilawi al-Anbari (Arabic: أبو عبد الرحمن البيلاوي الأنباري), was a top commander in the Islamic State of Iraq and the Levant and the head of its Military Council, prior to his killing by Iraqi security forces on 4 June 2014.

== Biography ==
Al-Bilawi belonged to the Al-bu Bali clan of the Dulaim, the largest tribe in the Iraqi Al Anbar Governorate. His tribe formed the nucleus of the resistance/insurgency against U.S. forces in Iraq. The Dulaimis returned to the armed insurgency in 2014.

The governor of Anbar at the time, Ahmad Khalaf al-Dulaimi, claimed that he taught al-Bilawi when they were both at the Iraqi Military Academy. Al-Bilawi graduated in 1993 and went on to become an infantry officer in the Iraqi military, achieving the rank of captain.

After the US-led 2003 invasion of Iraq, al-Bilawi joined al-Qaida in Iraq and worked closely with its then-leader, Abu Musab al-Zarqawi. According to an audio address by ISIL' official spokesman Abu Mohammad al-Adnani released on 11 June 2014, al-Bilawi was one of the founders of Jama'at al-Tawhid wal-Jihad and trained many jihadists during the insurgency.

Najm al-Bilawi was detained by American forces in 2005 in Camp Bucca. Al-Bilawi was one of the approximately 500 prisoners who escaped during a mass jailbreak from Abu Ghraib prison in July 2013, following an armed assault on the prison from the outside by members of the Islamic State of Iraq and the Levant.

Following his escape, he became a member of ISIL's Military Council and had a major role in planning and leading the group's military offensive in Northern and Central Iraq. Al-Bilawi was killed on 4 June 2014 in a raid by Iraqi security forces in Mosul. Following his death, a laptop belonging to al-Bilawi revealed high quality intelligence on the operations and leadership structure of ISIL. Al-Bilawi had been leading the planning for a military operation against Mosul, following his death ISIL launched the attack, resulting in their total seizure of the city by 9 June 2014. The attack was named the "Invasion of Asadullah al-Bilawi Abu Abdul Rahman" in his honour.

His death was acknowledged by ISIL's official spokesman, Abu Muhammad al-Adnani, in a June 2014 statement that praised his contributions to the group. He was reportedly succeeded by Abu Muhannad al-Suwaydawi as leader of the ISIL Military Council.
