= Abdul Qader al-Najdi =

Iraqi Islamic militant (died 2020)

- Born: 1990; Tikrit, Iraq
- Died: 23 September 2020 (aged 29–30); Sabha, Libya
- Other name: Abu Muaz al-Tikriti
- Occupations: Iraqi Islamic militant, Islamic State in Libya leader

Abdul Qader al-Najdi, also known as Abu Muaz al-Tikriti, was an Iraqi Islamic militant and the leader of the Islamic State in Libya. He was killed in September 2020.

== History ==
He is sometimes confused as being a Saudi due to the 'al-Najdi' in his name (Najd being a region of Saudi Arabia), but he was an Iraqi from the city of Tikrit as indicated by his surname.

He replaced Abu Nabil al-Anbari who was killed in November 2015. His appointment was announced in the IS newsletter al-Naba in March 2016.

The Libyan National Army (LNA) reported in September 2020 that during a raid in Sabha, it had killed the man who had led the Libyan branch of IS since 2015 who they identified as Abu Muaz al-Iraqi, also known as Abu Abdullah al-Iraqi.
