= Islamic State – Libya Province =

Branch of the Islamic State in Libya

Libyan Provinces
- Leaders: Abu Nabil al-Anbari † (2014–2015); Abdul Qader al-Najdi † (2015–2020); Hashem Abdul-Jawad Abu Sedra (2020–2024); Unknown (2024–present)
- Dates active: 13 November 2014 – present
- Groups: (Islamic State) Fezzan Province; Cyrenaica Province; Tripolitania Province; Katiba al-Bittar al-Libi (2014–2016)
- Headquarters: Derna (2014–2018); Sirte (2015–2016); Benghazi (2014–2017); Sabha (2014–2019); Unknown (2019–present)
- Active regions: Libya
- Ideology: Islamic Statism
- Status: Active
- Size: 50 (2022); 3,000–4,000 (2018); 500 (in 2017); 5,000–10,000 (in 2016)
- Part of: Islamic State
- Wars: the Second Libyan Civil War

The Islamic State – Libya Province (Arabic: ولاية ليبيا, romanized: Wilayah Libya) is a militant Islamist group active in Libya under three branches: Fezzan Province (Note: (Arabic: ولاية فزان, romanized: Wilayah Fizan)) in the desert south, Cyrenaica Province (Note: (Arabic: ولاية برقة, romanized: Wilayah Barqah)) in the east, and Tripolitania Province (Note: (Arabic: ولاية طرابلس, romanized: Wilayah Tarabulus)) in the west around Tripoli, Libya's capital city. The branches were formed on 13 November 2014, following pledges of allegiance to IS leader Abu Bakr al-Baghdadi by Islamist militants in Libya. From 2022, the Libyan affiliates of IS stopped carrying out major attacks, though some minor cells remained active as of 2025.

== Background ==
Following the 2011 Libyan Civil War, which resulted in the ousting of Colonel Muammar Gaddafi and his government, many rebel fighters went to Syria to fight alongside militant groups who were fighting Bashar al-Assad and his loyalists in the Syrian Civil War. In 2012, one group of Libyans fighting in Syria declared the establishment of the Battar Brigade. The Battar Brigade would later pledge loyalty to IS, and fight for it in both Syria and Iraq.

In early 2014, up to 300 Battar Brigade veterans returned to Libya. In Derna, they formed a new faction called the Islamic Youth Shura Council, which began recruiting militants from other local groups. Among those who joined were many members of the Derna branch of Ansar al-Sharia. During the next few months, they declared war on anyone in Derna who opposed them, killing judges, civic leaders and other opponents, including local militants who rejected their authority such as the al-Qaeda-allied Abu Salim Martyrs Brigade.

In September 2014, an IS delegation that had been dispatched by the group's leadership arrived in Libya. The representatives included Abu Nabil al Anbari, a senior aide to al-Baghdadi and a veteran of the Iraq conflict, the Saudi Abu Habib al-Jazrawi, and the Yemeni or Saudi Abu al-Baraa el-Azdi, a militant and preacher from Syria. On 5 October 2014, the Islamic Youth Shura Council-aligned militant factions came together and pledged allegiance to IS. After the pledging ceremony, more than 60 pickup trucks filled with fighters cruised through the city in a victory parade. A second more formal gathering involving a larger array of factions took place on 30 October 2014, where the militants gathered to pledge allegiance to Abu Bakr al-Baghdadi in the city square.

On 13 November 2014, al-Baghdadi released an audio recording in which he accepted pledges of allegiance from supporters in five countries, including Libya, and announced the expansion of his group to those territories. He went on to announce the creation of three "provinces" (wilayah) in Libya: Wilayah al-Fizan (Fezzan in the desert south), Wilayah al-Barqah (Cyrenaica in the east), and Wilayah al-Tarabulus (Tripolitania in the west) surrounding the capital Tripoli. The three wilayahs in Libya represent statelets.

The Islamic State – Libya Province in 2015, during its peak

== Operations ==
=== Early activities and expansion ===
When founded, IS claimed a presence in al Bayda, Benghazi, Sirte, al-Khums, and the Libyan capital Tripoli. The Cyrenaica branch of IS had around 800 fighters and half a dozen camps in Derna's outskirts. It also had larger facilities in the Jebel Akhdar area, where North African fighters were trained.

In December 2014, IS recruiters in Turkey told their Libyan associates to stop sending fighters to Syria and to focus on domestic attacks, according to the Wall Street Journal. In the following weeks, IS carried out attacks against oil installations and international hotels, performed mass executions and attempted to take over further Libyan territory. The group made tactical alliances with al Qaeda-linked groups that did not formally pledge allegiance to it, such as the Benghazi branch of Ansar al-Sharia, members of Tunisia's Ansar al-Sharia, and al-Qaeda in the Islamic Maghreb's Tarek Ibn Ziyad Brigade. On 30 March 2015, Ansar al-Sharia's general Sharia jurist Abu Abdullah Al-Libi pledged allegiance to IS, a number of the group's members defected with him.

The city of Sirte had been loyal to Muammar Gaddafi and suffered massive damage at the conclusion of the 2011 Civil War, later becoming home to militant Islamist groups like Ansar al-Sharia. IS formally announced their presence in Sirte in early 2015, driving a parade of vehicles through the city and declaring it part of their caliphate. Ansar al-Sharia split over how to respond, with most of their members joining IS. The group reportedly recruited many locals, former Gaddafi supporters alienated from the post-war political order in Libya, after they "repented" and pledged allegiance to al-Baghdadi. They were quickly able to take over much of the city. IS implemented their harsh interpretation of Sharia gradually, first focusing on building loyalty and allegiance from the tribal society of Sirte. In August 2015 Islamic codes of dress and behaviour began to be enforced more strongly and punishments like crucifixions and lashings began to be carried out. There was an uprising against IS in Sirte in the same month, with members of the Ferjani tribe, Salafists and former members of the security forces attacking IS forces. IS brought in reinforcements from outside of Sirte and the uprising was swiftly defeated, with media reports claiming dozens or hundreds of Sirte residents were killed after the fighting.

IS began to solidify its rule in Sirte, increasing its state building efforts and using it as a base to expand its territory. IS fighters from Sirte took over the neighbouring towns of Nofaliya, and Harawa during this period. They also seized control of Ghardabiya Airbase and important infrastructure like power plants and part of the Great Man-Made River water irrigation project. By early 2016, there were an estimated 1,500, mostly foreign, fighters in the city, and Vice Admiral Clive Johnstone, commander of NATO's Allied Maritime Command, warned that IS militants aspired to build a maritime arm that could carry out attacks in the Mediterranean Sea against tourist and transfer ships.

The group suffered reverses in other parts of Libya during this period, including in Derna, Benghazi, and Sabratha. In June 2015, clashes erupted in Derna between IS and the rival Shura Council of Mujahideen in Derna supported by the Libyan Air Force, which caused heavy casualties on both sides and led to IS forces being driven out of their strongholds in the city the following month. In November 2015, a US air strike killed ISIL's leader in Libya, Abu Nabil al Anbari. He was succeeded by Abdel Qader al-Najdi. In early 2016, the Khalifa Haftar-led Libyan National Army, reportedly with the assistance of French Special Forces, captured parts of Benghazi that had been held by IS for months. In February 2016, a U.S. air strike targeted an IS training camp near Sabratha, killing more than 40 people including the Tunisian IS member Noureddine Chouchane, linked to the 2015 Sousse attacks, as well as two Serbians who had been kidnapped by IS in 2015.

=== Loss of territory and activity as raiding force ===
An IS training camp near Sirte in January 2017, shortly after the fall of this city to anti-IS forces

In December 2016, following a 7-month long battle, IS was cleared from Sirte by Libyan Forces, with assistance from air strikes by the United States. The group withdrew to desert areas south of Sirte, and began mostly low level attacks on Libyan forces and local infrastructure. In January 2017, U.S. airstrikes on an IS base 25 miles southwest of Sirte reportedly killed over 80 militants. Having suffered heavy losses, the Libyan branch of IS greatly declined in activity in the next years.

Over a course of ten days in 2019, from September 19 to 29, AFRICOM claimed airstrikes that they carried out on the Islamic State in southwestern Libya on four separate occasions left 43 militants dead. As of 2020, IS forces in Libya mostly operate as moving insurgencies. Instead of trying to hold territory, they temporarily occupy areas and raid them, launch attacks on security posts, and generally cause instability. IS attacks continue in all parts of Libya. In operating as mobile raiders, the Islamic State militants attempt to prevent the restoration of state authority throughout Libya, thereby maintaining a chaotic situation in which they could attempt a comeback in the future. The IS central command also regards its forces' continued presence in Libya as important due to the area being a useful springboard for terrorist attacks on Europe and for an expansion into and connection with Sub-Saharan Africa.

On 6 June 2021, IS claimed responsibility for a blast that killed 2 police officers, including a senior police officer, during an SVBIED attack in the southern city of Sebha, Libya. On 14 June 2021, IS activated an IED against a patrol of the Libyan General Haftar's army in the Al-Haruj Mountains, near the city of Fuqaha, about 380 km south of Sirte, killing a Libyan army commander and his escort. They also released photos of their operatives in Libya including a photo of a recent suicide bomber that attacked Libyan police officers on June 6, 2021.

In April 2022, the last attack of Libyan IS fighters –recorded by Al-Naba– was carried out. From this point onward, the Libyan elements largely ceased their operations, though they remained active. In December 2022, representatives of the Libyan branch pledged allegiance to IS caliph Abu al-Hussein al-Husseini al-Qurashi. In 2024, Libyan security forces announced the arrest of Hashem Abdul-Jawad Abu Sedra, the emir of the IS forces in Libya. He had reportedly tried to reorganize his remaining loyalists in the remote mountainous regions and the desert of Libya. In August 2025, Libyan security services broke up three IS cells which had been associated with "fundraising, smuggling, and recruiting" for the Islamic State. In the next month, Al-Naba called upon the Libyan forces of IS to resume the open armed struggle. Overall, researcher Daniel Milton described the Libyan provinces as "repressed" branches of IS by the end of 2025.

== Foreign fighters ==
In Libya, IS heavily relied on foreign volunteers for its fighting forces. IS recruits came from across the Middle East and Africa. Libyan intelligence chiefs claimed in early February 2016, that the Islamic State is recruiting fighters from Africa's poorest nations, including Chad, Mali and Sudan. IS offers generous salaries compared to the average wages in the region. Many of the fighters reach Libya using existing people-smuggling routes used by African migrants heading to Europe. Following the battle of Sirte during which most of IS's foreign forces in Libya were killed, the Libyan branch increasingly recruited Sub-Saharan Africans into its ranks.

== Propaganda ==
The "Media Office for Cyrenaica Province" has published photos and other material showing buildings with IS insignia, suicide bombers, parades, and pledges of allegiance to Abu Bakr al-Baghdadi. A reporter for The New York Times who visited the outskirts of Sirte found that IS had taken over the local radio station, and all four stations on the dial were being used to transmit Islamic sermons.

IS in Libya had threatened to facilitate the arrival of thousands of migrants to destabilize Europe if they are attacked.

== Laws ==
Billboards instructing women how to dress according to Sharia were erected in Sirte in July 2015. The billboard gave a list of restrictions on dress for women.
"Instructions on wearing the hijab according to Sharia

1. It must be thick and not revealing
2. It must be loose (not tight)
3. It must cover all the body
4. It must not be attractive
5. It must not resemble the clothes of unbelievers or men
6. It must not be decorative and eye-catching
7. It must not be perfumed.

== Human rights abuses and war crimes allegations ==
By late 2014, Derna was fully under IS control, with the Black Standard flying over government buildings, police cars carrying IS insignia, and the local football stadium being used for public executions. A Human Rights Watch report accused IS linked groups in control of Derna of war crimes and human rights abuses that include terrorizing residents in the absence of state authorities and the rule of law. Human Rights Watch documented 3 apparent summary executions and at least 10 public floggings by the Islamic Youth Shura Council, which joined IS in November 2014. They also documented beheadings of three Derna residents and 250 seemingly politically motivated assassinations of judges, public officials, members of the security forces, journalists, and others with no public investigations. Sarah Leah Whitson, HRW Middle East, and North Africa director said, "Commanders should understand that they may face domestic or international prosecution for the grave rights abuses their forces are committing."

Under IS's watch, women increasingly wore face veils and young men caught drinking alcohol were flogged. Education changes included male/female segregation of students, and the removal of history and geography from the curriculum. New Islamic religious police flyers ordered clothing stores to cover their mannequins and not to display "scandalous women's clothes that cause sedition." The law school was closed.

== Claimed and alleged attacks ==
- In November 2014, IS's Cyrenaica wing claimed it had previously dispatched nine suicide bombers from Egypt, Libya, and Tunisia to carry out attacks against Libyan security forces in and around Benghazi. CNN reported that several of these attacks seemed to correspond to previously unclaimed suicide bombings, including a twin-attack on a Libyan special forces camp in Benghazi on 23 July 2014 and a 2 October 2014 attack on a military checkpoint near Benina airport.
- IS's Cyrenaica Province is the prime suspect in a 12 November 2014 suicide bombing in Tobruk that killed one and wounded 14, and a bombing outside Labraq air force base in Al-Bayda that killed four, according to a CNN report.
- On 13 November 2014, bombs exploded near the embassies of Egypt and the UAE in Tripoli, however no casualties were reported. An IS-linked Twitter account suggested their Tripoli wing was responsible for the attacks, according to the SITE Intelligence Group.
- In December 2014, the beheaded bodies of Mohammed Battu and Sirak Qath, human rights activists abducted in Derna on 6 November 2014, were found.
- In January 2015, IS's Cyrenaica branch published photos claiming to show the execution of two Tunisian journalists who had been kidnapped in September 2014.
- On 27 January 2015, an attack on the Corinthia Hotel in Tripoli involving gunmen and a car bomb killed at least ten people, including five foreigners. The IS's Tripoli branch claimed responsibility for the attack, claiming it was revenge for the death of Libyan al-Qaeda operative Abu Anas al-Libi in American custody earlier in the month.
- On 3 February 2015, gunmen claiming to represent IS stormed a French-Libyan oil field near the town of Mabruk, killing nine guards.
- On 15 February 2015, IS released a video showing the beheading of 21 Christian Egyptians who had been kidnapped in Sirte. IS's Dabiq magazine had earlier published photos of the Copts and threatened to kill them to "avenge the kidnapping of Muslim women by the Egyptian Coptic Church".
- On 20 February 2015, the IS carried out bombings in Al Qubbah, which targeted a petrol station, a police station and the home of the Libyan parliamentary speaker, killing at least 40 people.
- On 24 March 2015, IS claimed responsibility for a suicide car bombing that killed five soldiers and two civilians at an army checkpoint in Benghazi.
- On 5 April 2015, IS's Tripolitania branch claimed responsibility for a suicide bombing on a checkpoint outside Misrata, which killed four and wounded 21.
- On 13 April 2015, militants claiming loyalty to IS posted claims of responsibility on Twitter for a bombing outside the Moroccan embassy that caused no casualties, and a gun attack on the South Korean embassy the day before that killed two guards.
- On 19 April 2015, a video was released online by IS showing the killing of approximately 30 Ethiopian Christians in Libya. 15 of the men were beheaded, and another group of the same size were shot in the head.
- On 27 April 2015, the bodies of five men with slit throats were found in the Green Mountain forests. The bodies were identified as five journalists working for a Libyan TV station who had been kidnapped at an IS checkpoint in August 2014.
- On 9 June 2015, US government officials confirmed that IS in Libya had captured 86 Eritrean migrants south of Tripoli.
- On 10 June 2015, IS gunmen in Derna killed Nasser Akr and Salem Derbi, two senior commanders of the Al-Qaeda affiliated Shura Council of Mujahideen in Derna.
- On 7 January 2016, IS carried out a truck bomb attack against a police training center in Zliten, killing at least 60 and wounding around 200.
- On 25 February 2016, IS fighters in Sabratha took control of a security headquarters, killing and beheading 12 security officers before being driven out the next day.
- On 11 September 2018, IS fighters in Tripoli carried out an attack on the National Oil Corporation of Libya, which is part of an area claimed by IS as its "Libya Wilayat-Tripoli Region".
- On 28 October 2018, at least 5 people were killed, including the son of the chairman of the local council, and at least 10 people, including employees of local police stations, were abducted in an IS attack on the Libyan town of Fuqaha. IS attacked the desert town with 25 vehicles and set local government buildings and police stations on fire before fleeing southward to the Haruj mountains to avoid a confrontation with LNA forces.
- On 8 July 2019, a group of IS fighters appeared in southern Libya under the command of Abu Musab al-Libi and took responsibility for an attack that killed and wounded an unidentified number of LNA members on 3 July. Al-Libi was previously a commander of IS fighters in Benghazi.
- On 23 May 2020, a blast targeted a security point guarded by LNA soldiers at the entrance to Traghan, southern Libya. There were no casualties, but IS claimed responsibility for the incident, making it the first claimed attack in almost a year.
- On 6 June 2021, a blast killed at least two people, including a senior police officer, at a checkpoint in the southern city of Sebha. IS claimed responsibility for the explosion, saying that one of its militants carried out a suicide bombing by attacking the checkpoint in an explosive-filled car.
- In October 2026, social media posts purported that three Egyptian migrant workers were allegedly abducted by IS-Libya in the town of Zliten, with two being subsequently released and the third having been executed for being a Coptic deacon.

== Commentary and significance ==
The growth of its branch in Libya is seen by IS and its proponents as a model for IS expansion outside Iraq and Syria.

The Long War Journal wrote that no well-established Libyan militant organizations had pledged their support to the group and that "the Islamic State has failed, thus far, to garner the allegiance of Ansar al Sharia Libya, which is notorious for its role in the Sept. 11, 2012, terrorist attacks in Benghazi and remains one of the most powerful jihadist organizations in eastern Libya. None of Ansar al Sharia's allies in the Benghazi Revolutionaries Shura Council, the Islamist coalition fighting General Khalifa Haftar's forces for control of territory, pledged allegiance to Baghdadi. The Islamic State has supporters in Libya, particularly among the jihadist youth. But other groups are still, by all outward appearances, more entrenched."

Libya Dawn claimed that it had intelligence reports showing that those who claimed to support IS in Tripoli were agents provocateur planted by foreign countries to discredit it. The statement was viewed as an attempt to explain away the growing issue of the extremists in western Libya, with IS supporters said to be present at the Majr camp in Zliten, and in Sabratha. Prime Minister of Malta Joseph Muscat and Leader of the Opposition Simon Busuttil called for the United Nations and European Union to intervene in Libya to prevent the country from becoming a failed state.

== Designation as a terrorist organization ==
| Country | Date | References |
| United States | 19 May 2016 | |
| Australia | 28 November 2016 | |
| Iraq | 10 March 2020 | |

== See also ==
- List of wars and battles involving IS
