= US-led intervention in Iraq (2014–2021) =

Coalition against the Islamic State

- Part of the Operation Inherent Resolve in the War against the Islamic State, the War in Iraq (2013–2017), Islamic State insurgency in Iraq (2017–present), and the war on terror
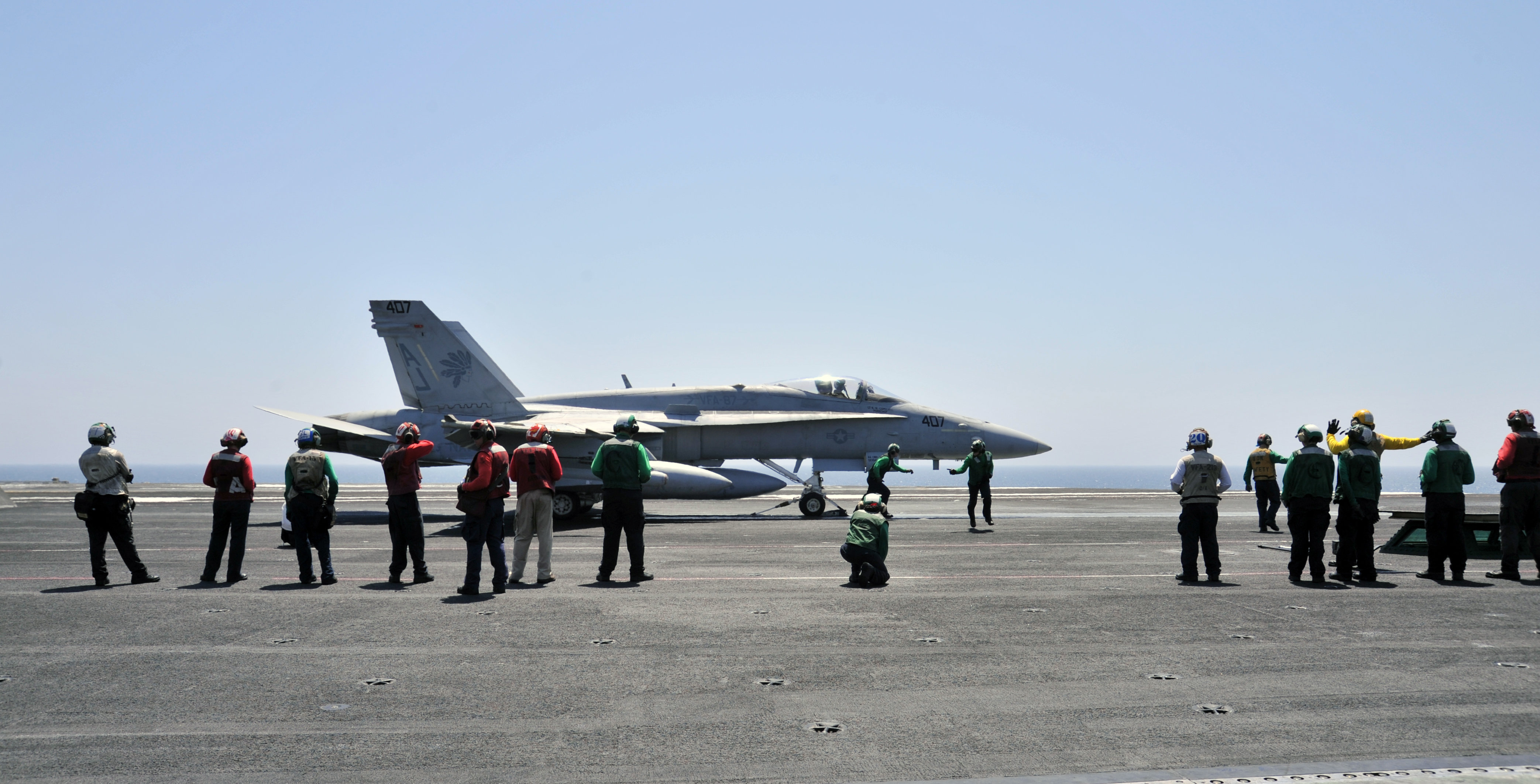
- An American F/A-18C Hornet aboard USS George H.W. Bush prior to the launch of operations over Iraq in 2014.
Date	15 June 2014 – 9 December 2021 (7 years, 5 months, 3 weeks and 3 days)
Location	Iraq
Result	Coalition and Iraqi victory: Tens of thousands of ISIL fighters killed; 14,616 U.S. and allied airstrikes on ISIL positions in Iraq; Heavy damage dealt to ISIL forces; military defeat in Iraq; Iraq declares military victory against ISIL on 9 December 2017; Low-intensity ISIL insurgency following December 2017; Multinational humanitarian and arming of ground forces efforts; Ongoing U.S.–led Coalition advising and training of Iraqi and Kurdish ground forces; U.S.-led coalition forces begin discussing a withdrawal from Iraq following March 2020; U.S. maintains limited military presence, approximately 2,500 U.S. military personnel remain in Iraq as of December 2021, providing assistance, advice and training to Iraqi forces; Coalition ends combat mission in December 2021, but remain in an advisory and assistance capacity; Withdrawal of U.S. ground forces from Baghdad and key military bases in Iraq in 2025; Withdrawal of all remaining U.S. forces from Iraq stationed in the semi autonomous Kurdistan Region on 30 September 2026
Territorial changes	Iraqi government forces regain control of most ISIL held territory, small sleeper cells suspected to remain

Belligerents
Coalition of foreign countries: CJTF–OIR: United States; Australia; Belgium; Canada (2014–16); Denmark; France; Germany; Italy; Jordan; Morocco (2014–16); Netherlands; New Zealand; United Kingdom; Turkey (2014–17); Local forces: Iraq: Iraqi Armed Forces; ISOF; IrAF; Nineveh Plain Protection Units; Peshmerga	Islamic State Of Iraq and The Levant; White Flags

Commanders and leaders
(United States) Barack Obama (2014–2017) (United States) Donald Trump (2017–2021) (United States) Joe Biden (2021) (United States) Chuck Hagel (2014–2015) (United States) Ashton B. Carter (2015–2017) (United States) James Mattis (2017–2019) (United States) Mark T. Esper (2019–2020) (United States) Lloyd J. Austin III (2021) (United States) Joseph Votel (United States) Stephen J. Townsend (United States) Gary J. Volesky (United States) Andrew J. Loiselle (United Kingdom) David Cameron (2014–2016) (United Kingdom) Theresa May (2016–2019) (United Kingdom) Boris Johnson (2019–2021) (United Kingdom) Michael Fallon (United Kingdom) Andrew Pulford (United Kingdom) Nick Clegg (Canada) Stephen Harper (2014–2015) (Canada) Justin Trudeau (2015–2016) (Canada) Rob Nicholson (Canada) Harjit Sajjan (Canada) Thomas J. Lawson (Canada) Jonathan Vance (Canada) Yvan Blondin (Canada) Michael Hood (Australia) Tony Abbott (2014–2015) (Australia) Malcolm Turnbull (2015–2018) (Australia) Scott Morrison (2018–2021) (Australia) Marise Payne (Australia) David Johnston (Australia) Trevor Jones (Australia) Tim Innes (France) François Hollande (2014–2017) (France) Emmanuel Macron (2017–2021) (France) Jean-Yves Le Drian (France) Pierre de Villiers (Denmark) Helle Thorning-Schmidt (Denmark) Lars Løkke Rasmussen (Denmark) Peter Bartram (Germany) Angela Merkel (Germany) Ursula von der Leyen (Germany) Volker Wieker (Netherlands) Mark Rutte (Netherlands) Jeanine Hennis-Plasschaert (Netherlands) Frans Timmermans (Netherlands) Sander Schnitger (Netherlands) Dennis Luyt (Turkey) Recep Tayyip Erdoğan (Turkey) Binali Yıldırım (Turkey) Ahmet Davutoğlu (Turkey) Vecdi Gönül (Turkey) İsmet Yılmaz (Turkey) Fikri Işık (Turkey) Nurettin Canikli (Turkey) Necdet Özel (Turkey) Hulusi Akar (Turkey) Yaşar Güler (Jordan) Abdullah II (Jordan) Abdullah Ensour (Jordan) Hani Mulki (Morocco) Mohammed VI (Morocco) Abdelilah Benkirane (Morocco) Bouchaib Arroub (Iraq) Barham Salih (2018–2021) (Iraq) Fuad Masum (2014–2018) (Iraq) Nouri al-Maliki (2014) (Iraq) Haider al-Abadi (2014–2018) (Iraq) Adil Abdul-Mahdi (2014–2020) (Iraq) Mustafa al-Kadhimi (2020–2021) (Kurdistan Region) Masoud Barzani (2014–2017) (Kurdistan Region) Jaafar Sheikh Mustafa (Kurdistan Region) Mustafa Said Qadir	Abu Ibrahim al-Hashimi al-Qurashi; Faysal Ahmad Ali al-Zahrani; Abu Jandal al-Masri; Abu Yusaf; Ahlam al-Nasr; Abu Fatima al-Jaheishi †; Abu Ahmad al-Alwani †; Zulfi Hoxha †; Abu Obeida Baghdad (executed); Bajro Ikanović †; Abu Yasser al-Issawi † (Former deputy leader of ISIS); Omar Jawad al-Mashhadani † (Chief ISIS suicide attack organiser in Baghdad); Muthanna Shataran al-Marawi † (ISIS military commander in charge of the Al-Rutba region) (Islamic State) Abu Bakr al-Baghdadi † (Self-proclaimed Caliph) (Islamic State) Abu Ala al-Afri † (Deputy Leader of ISIL) (Islamic State) Abu Mohammad al-Adnani † (Spokesperson); Abu Ayman al-Iraqi † (Head of Military Shura) (Islamic State) Abu Muslim al-Turkmani † (Deputy, Iraq) (Islamic State) Abu Waheeb † (Top Anbar Commander) (Islamic State) Abu Hajar al-Souri † (Top Aide) (Islamic State) Akram Qirbash † (Top ISIL judge) (Islamic State) Ali Mohammed al-Shayer † (Senior ISIL Leader) (Islamic State) Radwan Taleb al-Hamdouni † (Former top ISIL leader in Mosul) (Islamic State) Hassan Saeed Al-Jabouri † (ISIL governor of Mosul) "Prince of Nineveh" † (top ISIL commander in Mosul); Abu-Jihad Abdullah Dlemi † (ISIL Emir of Fallujah) Abu Maria † (top ISIL leader in Tikrit); Sleiman Daoud al-Afari (POW) (ISIL chemical weapons chief); Sami Jasim Muhammad al-Jaburi (POW)

Strength
United States: 5,200–6,000 troops; 7,000 contractors; USS George H.W. Bush carrier strike group; USS Carl Vinson carrier strike group (replaced USS George H.W. Bush in late October); USS Theodore Roosevelt carrier strike group (replaced USS Carl Vinson in late March); F-15 Eagle, F-16 Fighting Falcon, F/A-18 Hornet, F/A-18 Super Hornet, AV-8B Harrier and F-22 Raptor fighter jets; B-1 Lancer bomber aircraft; EA-6B Prowler & EA-18G Growler electronic warfare aircraft.; Boeing AH-64 Apache attack helicopters; MQ-1 Predator, MQ-9 Reaper drones; Australia: 400 RAAF personnel; 200 special forces troops; 300 regular soldiers (combined with 150 New Zealand soldiers); 6 F/A-18 Super Hornet; 1 Boeing 737 AEW&C surveillance aircraft; 1 KC-30A refueling plane; C-130J Hercules & C-17A Globemaster transport aircraft; Belgium: 6 F-16 Fighting Falcon fighters (withdrawn "due to financial constraints" in June 2015); 120 supporting troops (for the now withdrawn aircraft); 35 military advisers; Canada: 600 Canadian Armed Forces personnel; 100 special operations forces; 6 McDonnell Douglas CF-18 Hornet; 2 Lockheed CP-140 Aurora surveillance aircraft; 1 Airbus CC-150 Polaris refueling tanker; C-130J Hercules & C-17 Globemaster III transport aircraft; Denmark: 7 F-16 Fighting Falcon fighters; 1 C-130J Hercules transport aircraft; 1 mobile radar station; 400 troops (support, special forces and trainers); France: 1,000 armed forces; 7 Dassault Rafale, 8 Mirage 2000; 1 Breguet Atlantique; 1 French frigate Forbin (D620); Germany: 127 troops inside Iraq; 6 Panavia Tornado Recce jets; 1 Airbus A310 MRTT for in-flight refueling; Italy: 280 troops; 4 Panavia Tornado; 1 Boeing KC-767 for in-flight refueling; 2 MQ-1 Predator; Netherlands: 6 F-16 Fighting Falcon fighters + 2 spare; 250 supporting troops; 130 trainers for the Iraqi Army; 2 Patriot missile batteries and 200 supporting troops in Turkey to defend its NATO ally against cross-border attacks.; New Zealand: 10 military advisers.; Spain: 300 trainers for the Iraqi Army; 6 Patriot missile batteries and 130 supporting troops in Turkey to defend its NATO ally against cross-border attacks.; United Kingdom: 1 Boeing RC-135 Reconnaissance aircraft; 8 Tornado GR4 ground attack aircraft; 2 armed MQ-9 Reaper; 1 Type 45 destroyer; 1 Trafalgar-class submarine (SSN); Special forces including the Special Air Service (SAS) and additional cargo aircraft and air-to-air tanker aircraft on standby in the area.	5,000–10,000 (UN Security Council 2019 report); 28,600–31,600 (2016 US Defense Department estimate); Around 100,000 fighters (according to Kurdistan Region Chief of Staff.); At least a few hundred tanks 3 Drones

Casualties and losses
United States: 69 soldiers killed (including non-hostile) (Note: The numbers are given by the U.S. Department of Defense and includes "casualties that occurred in Bahrain, Cyprus, Egypt, Iraq, Israel, Jordan, Kuwait, Lebanon, Qatar, Saudi Arabia, Syria, Turkey, United Arab Emirates, the Mediterranean Sea east of 25° Longitude, the Persian Gulf, and the Red Sea".); 2 HH-60 Pave Hawk helicopters crashed; 1 F-15 damaged; France: 1 soldier killed (possibly in Syria); United Kingdom: 1 servicemen killed; 2 civilians executed; Canada: 1 soldier killed, 3 wounded (friendly fire); Saudi Arabia: 3 border guards killed; Turkey: 4 Turkish soldiers wounded	70,000+ killed (end of 2017); 32,000+ targets destroyed or damaged (including Syria; 2/3 of targets were hit in Iraq) (per Coalition sources): 164 tanks; 388 HMMWVs; 2,638 pieces of oil infrastructure; 1,000+ fuel tanker trucks
- Estimated 6,000+ civilians killed by Coalition airstrikes in Iraq; At least 28,000 civilians killed by ISIL in Iraq, with potentially up to 20 thousand more. (per Iraqi Body Count)(UN) Over 550,000 civilians displaced

On 15 June 2014, United States President Barack Obama ordered United States forces to be dispatched in response to the Northern Iraq offensive (June 2014) of the Islamic State (ISIL), as part of Operation Inherent Resolve. At the invitation of the Iraqi government, American troops went to assess Iraqi forces and the threat posed by ISIL.

In early August 2014, ISIL began its Northern Iraq offensive. On 5 August, the United States started supplying the Kurdish Peshmerga forces with weapons. On 8 August, the United States began airstrikes against ISIL positions in Iraq. Nine other countries also launched airstrikes against ISIL, more or less in concert with Kurdish and Iraqi government ground troops. By December 2017, ISIL had no remaining territory in Iraq, following the 2017 Western Iraq campaign.

In addition to direct military intervention, the American-led coalition provided extensive support to the Iraqi Security Forces (ISF) via training, intelligence, and personnel. The total cost of coalition support to the ISF, excluding direct military operations, was officially announced at ~$3.5 billion by March 2019. 189,000 Iraqi soldiers and police officers received training from coalition forces.

Despite U.S. objections, the Iraqi parliament demanded U.S. troops to withdraw in January 2020 following the deaths of Iraqi Deputy chief of the Popular Mobilization Units and popular Iranian Quds leader Qasem Soleimeni in a U.S. airstrike. It was also announced that both the U.K and Germany were cutting the size of troops in Iraq as well, In addition to withdrawing some of its troops, the U.K. pledged to completely withdraw from Iraq if asked to do so by the Iraqi government and Germany "temporarily thinned out" its bases in Baghdad and Camp Taji. Canada later joined in with the coalition withdrawal as well by transferring some of its troops stationed in Iraq to Kuwait. French and Australian forces stationed in the country have also objected to a withdrawal as well. The United Nations estimated in August 2020 that over 10,000 ISIL fighters remained in Iraq and Syria.

The coalition officially concluded its combat mission in Iraq in December 2021, but U.S. troops remained in Iraq to advise, train, and assist ISF against the ongoing ISIL insurgency, including providing air support and military aid. Under an agreement concluded in September 2024, the last U.S. troops departed Iraq on September 30, 2026. The Iraqi government declared a 4-day holiday through October 3, designating September 30 as Sovereignty Day.

== Background ==
=== Previous U.S. involvement ===
In 2003, the United States led a controversial invasion of Iraq, which was based on flawed intelligence that Iraq had weapons of mass destruction and links to al-Qaeda while under Ba'athist rule. By 2007, the number of U.S. forces in Iraq peaked at 170,000 soldiers. In 2011, the U.S. had withdrawn most of its troops from Iraq and later kept 20,000 employees in its embassy and consulates, including dozens of U.S. Marine Embassy Guards and approximately 4,500 private military contractors. Following the withdrawal, the U.S. resumed flying surveillance aircraft in order to collect intelligence about insurgent Islamist fighters targeting the Iraqi government.

=== Old enemies ===
After the invasion, the previous incarnations of ISIL (Jama'at al-Tawhid wal-Jihad [Jama'at], the Mujahideen Shura Council [MSC], and al-Qaeda in Iraq) interfered with occupation by the U.S.-led coalition. Jama'at and MSC started a campaign of terrorism in response to what resistance commander Abu Mohammed described as an occupation intended to humiliate and enchain the people of Iraq. Attacks by Jama'at and MSC targeted hundreds of Muslim Iraqis, several U.S. soldiers, and included in 2010 a church full of Christians. These attacks are presumed to include the beheadings in 2004 of three American civilians, one British, one South Korean, and one Japanese civilian.

=== ISIL advances in Northern Iraq ===
After the December 2011 withdrawal of U.S. troops from Iraq, violent insurgency of mainly Sunni Islamic Islamist fighters targeting the Iraqi government continued in what is called the Iraqi insurgency.

Between 5 and 11 June 2014, Sunni Islamic, jihadist, 'Islamic State of Iraq and the Levant' (ISIL) militants, already successful in the Syrian civil war, conquered the Iraqi cities of Samarra, Mosul and Tikrit, and threatened the Mosul Dam and Kirkuk, where Iraqi Kurdish Peshmerga troops took control from the Iraqi government.

=== Internet beheading video campaign 2014–2015 ===
On 12 August 2014, ISIL started a campaign of beheading Western and Japanese civilian hostages (announced 12 August, James Foley 19 August, Steven Sotloff 2 September, David Haines 13 September, Hervé Gourdel 24 September, Alan Henning 3 October, Peter Kassig 16 November, Haruna Yukawa sometime January 2015, Kenji Goto 30 January 2015) marketed via the internet.

== U.S.-led coalition against ISIL ==
On 5 September, 15 September and 3 December 2014, different sets of countries came together to discuss concerted action against ISIL. Present at all three meetings were the United States, United Kingdom, France, Germany, Italy, Canada, Turkey, and Denmark.

The coalition of 5 September (10 countries) decided to support anti-ISIL forces in Iraq and Syria.

The coalition of 15 September (26 countries) decided to support the Iraqi government militarily.

The coalition of 3 December 2014 (59 countries) agreed on a many-sided strategy, including cutting off ISIL's financing and funding and exposing ISIL's true nature.

=== U.S. naming controversy ===
Unlike previous U.S. combat operations, no name was initially given to the 2014 military operation in Iraq and Syria by the U.S. government, until mid-October. The fact that the operation was still nameless drew considerable media criticism. U.S. soldiers remained ineligible for Campaign Medals and other service decorations due to the continuing ambiguous nature of the U.S. involvement in Iraq. On 15 October 2014, two months after the first airstrikes by the U.S., the operation was named Inherent Resolve.

=== Support of the Iraqi government ===
After the United States in June 2014 started to send troops to Iraq to secure American interests and assets and advise the Iraqi forces (see section U.S. surveillance and military advising in Iraq), President Barack Obama end of September planned to send 1,600 troops to Iraq as "advisers" to the Iraqi Army and Kurdish forces. 800 of them would provide security for soldiers and Marines and for property; hundreds would train and advise Iraqi and Kurdish forces how to fight ISIL. 8–9 November Obama doubled the number of American soldiers in Iraq to some 3,100. By February 2015, the U.S. had deployed 4,500 troops. In June 2015, the U.S. had deployed an additional 450 troops to Iraq, increasing the U.S. troop presence in Iraq to at least 4,850.

Canadian Prime Minister Harper announced on 4 September 2014 that Canada would deploy "about 100" military advisers to be based in Baghdad assisting the Iraqi Military in the fight against ISIL. These personnel are special operations forces which would work closely with U.S. special forces to "provide advice that will help the government of Iraq and its security forces be more effective against ISIL", but their role was not expected to be direct combat. CBC News reports that about 100 Canadians would be deployed, primarily to help Kurdish forces.

Portugal has worked with neighboring Spain to provide training to the Iraqi Army south of Baghdad.

==== Building Partner Capacity ====
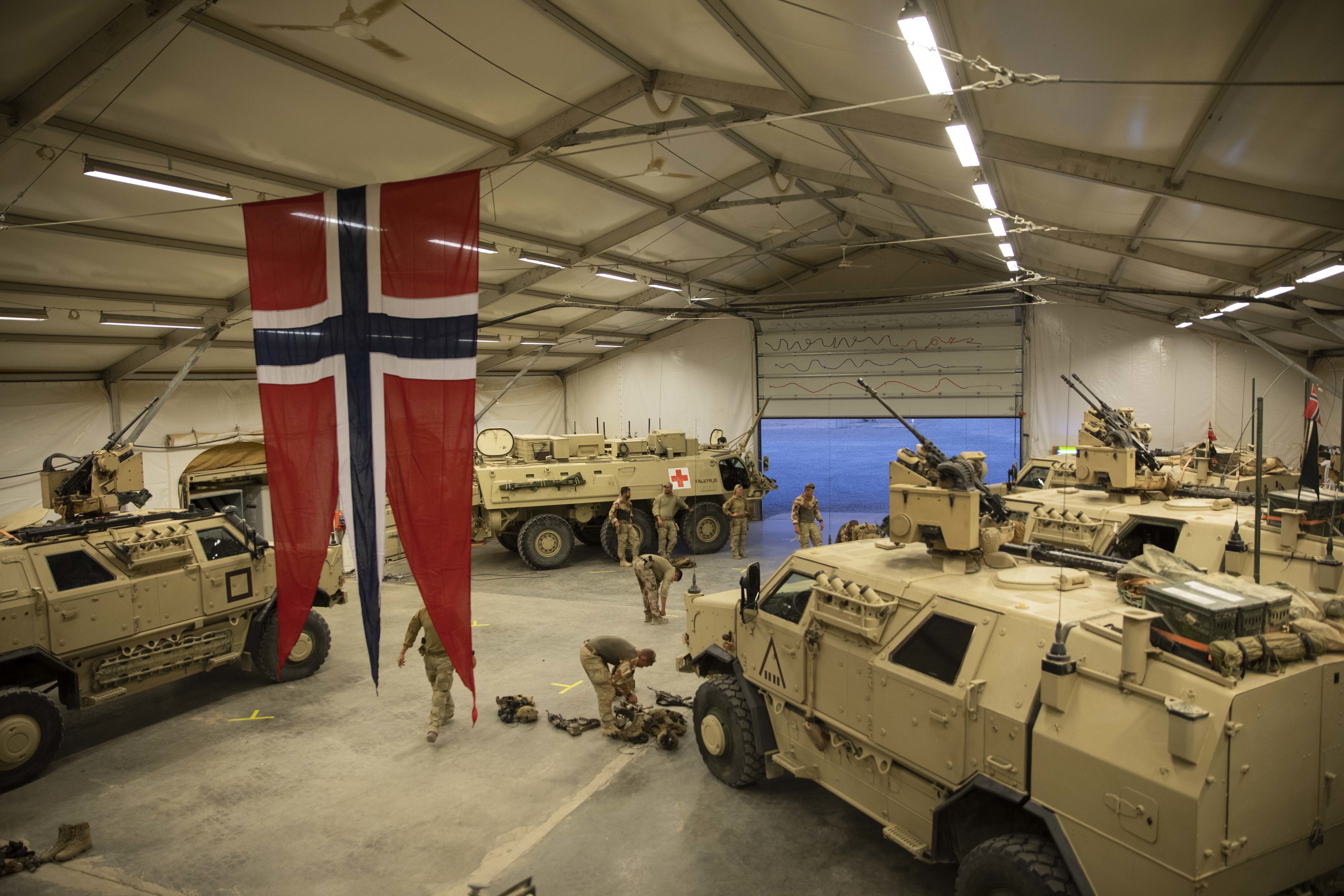
Norwegian QRF preparing for nighttime training at Al Asad Airbase, 8 July 2021

The Building Partner Capacity (BPC) program is meant to help the Iraqi government to prepare forces for the counter-attack against ISIL and the regaining of its territory. Australia in April 2015 committed 300 military personnel to the BPC training mission in Iraq. According to the U.S. Department of Defense, by May 2015 a dozen countries had committed themselves to the BPC program: Australia, Belgium, Denmark, France, Germany, Italy, Netherlands, New Zealand, Norway, Spain, United Kingdom and United States.

Denmark sent 120 military personnel to Iraq in November 2014 to train the Iraqi Army. Germany began shipping non-lethal military equipment to the Iraqi government and the Kurdish Region early in the intervention. Italy offered to supply weapons, ammunition, and other aid to local forces in Iraq. The prime minister of Italy Matteo Renzi visited Iraq and the Kurds on 20 August 2014 to consider the response to ISIL. He said that without international involvement it would be a "new Srebrenica". New Zealand announced in November 2014 it would send up to 143 military personnel to help train local Iraqi security forces. 16 of which were to be trainers, the remaining personnel will be deployed to protect the trainers, and help with advisory/intelligence roles. New Zealand also sent up to $14.5m in humanitarian aid. Norway sent 5 headquarters personnel and 120 advisors in October 2014 to help train the Iraqi Army, and has used transport aircraft to deliver supplies to Iraq. Spain provided 300 instructors to train the Iraqi Army and offered to provide weapons to both the Iraqi Army and the Kurdish Peshmerga forces; Spain also stationed a Patriot missile battery and 150 servicemen in Turkey in case of cross-border attacks against its NATO ally.

By May 2015, the program had trained 6,500 Iraqi forces.

=== Military aid to the Kurds ===
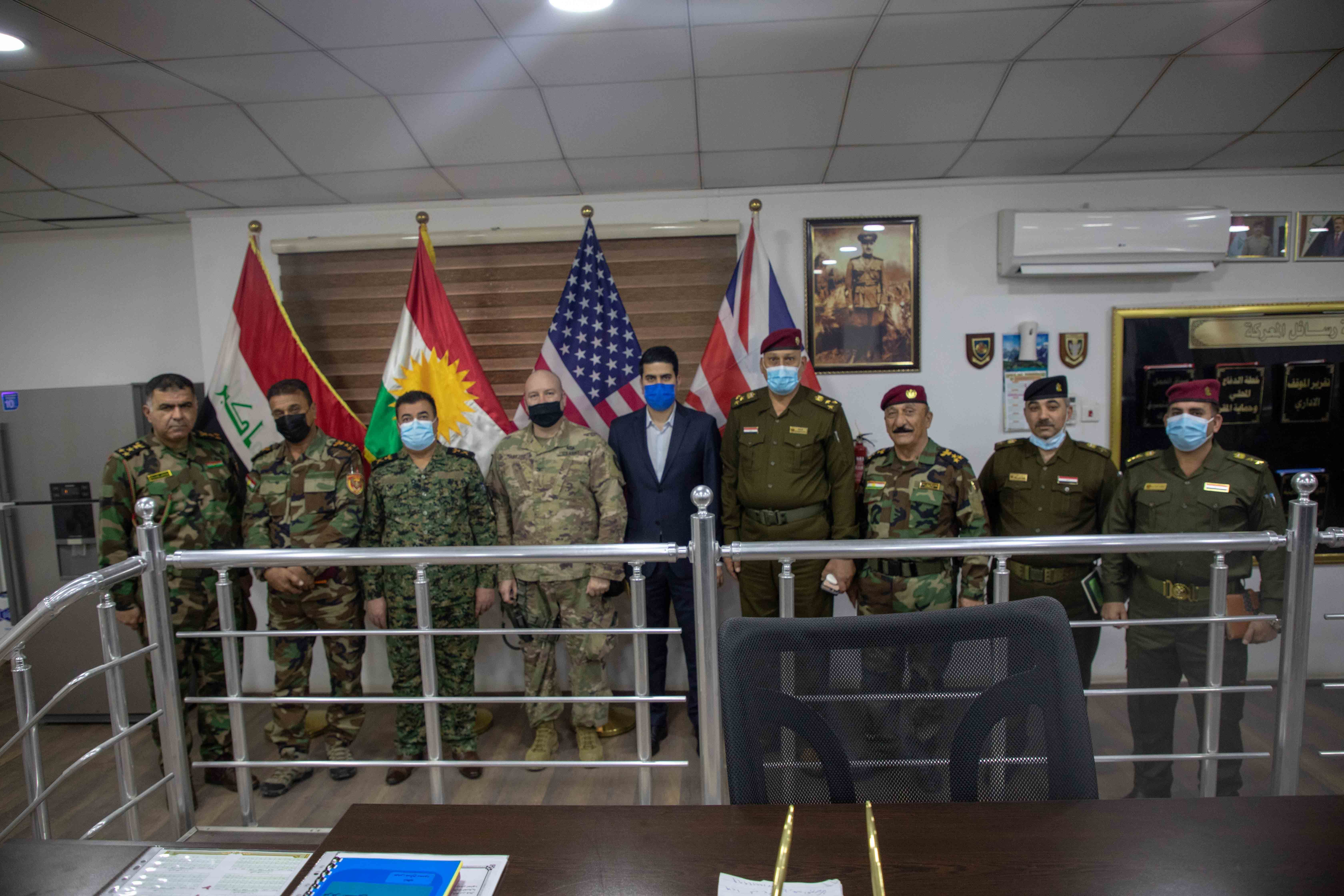
CJTF-OIR hosts a meeting between Peshmerga and Iraqi security forces at Camp Zarvani in Erbil, 17 February 2021

Spokesman Halgurd Hikmat for the Peshmerga Ministry confirmed that the United States, the United Kingdom, Germany, France, Canada, Italy, and also Finland have agreed to supply weapons and military goods to Kurdish Peshmerga. Erbil-based BASNEWS reported that the Kurdistan Regional Government, in cooperation with the Iraqi and American governments, will open a military air base in Erbil.

On 5 October 2015, CJTF-OIR announced that it had given 50,000 rifles and machine guns, 56 million rounds of small arms ammunition, 677+ mortars, 73,000+ mortar rounds, 5,000+ anti-tank weapons, 56,000+ anti-tank rounds, and 150+ vehicles to the Iraqi Kurdish forces.

- The United States had begun on 5 August 2014, with the direct supply of munitions to the Iraqi Kurdish Peshmerga forces and, with Iraq's agreement, the shipment of Foreign Military Sales (FMS) program weapons to the Kurds, according to Zalmay Khalilzad, the former U.S. ambassador to Iraq and the U.N., in The Washington Post, and the following days the American CIA secretly sent arms to the Kurds. Before 11 August, U.S. and allies had started rushing antitank weapons etc. to Kurdish fighters, and the U.S. intended to provide longer-range weapons.
- The United Kingdom placed the Special Air Service on the ground briefly and are airlifting munitions to the Kurds from an unnamed Eastern European nation. Members of the 2nd Battalion, the Yorkshire Regiment, have also been deployed to the area.
- Germany has provided instructors to train Kurdish Peshmerga troops. It is also supporting the Peshmerga with shipments of machine guns and ammunition, anti-tank missiles, armored transport vehicles and personal equipment like night vision goggles, helmets, vests, radio sets and other equipment. It hopes to provide equipment for 10,000 Peshmerga troops. It has also flown wounded Peshmerga fighters to German military hospitals. Germany has currently up to 150 paratroopers and other ground troops stationed in northern Iraq to train and advise Kurdish military forces.
- Greece donated Kalashnikov rifles and ammunition.
- France is planning to ship arms directly to the Kurds.
- Italy decided to give military aid to the Kurds.
- Australia in September began using RAAF C-17s and C-130Js to airlift arms and munitions to forces in Kurdish-controlled northern Iraq. Then Australian Prime Minister Tony Abbott said in October his country could dispatch up to 200 special forces troops to "advise" local forces in a "non-combat" role.
- Croatia in late August began sending arms to the Kurds. The armaments from Croatia are particularly useful to the effort because they are compatible with the Kurds' Russian made weapons systems which make up the majority of their equipment.
- The Czech Republic has or will provide weapons to local forces. The Czech Republic offered to provide 10 million rounds for AK-47, 8 million rounds for machine guns, 5,000 warheads for RPG and 5,000 hand grenades. In September 2014 with the help of Royal Canadian Air Force it sent 8 millions rounds for machine guns to Iraq and in December 2014 another supply flight (provided by U.S. Air Force's C-17 Globemaster) with 5,000 warheads.
- Estonia, Hungary, Greece, and Bulgaria have or will provide weapons to local forces.
  - The European Union welcomed the "decision by individual Member States to respond positively to the call by the Kurdish regional authorities to provide urgently military material."
- Albania has or will provide weapons to local forces. Albania in late August began sending arms to the Kurds. With the help of Western air transport systems, Albania has sent 22 million rounds of AK-47 7.62 millimeter bullets, 15,000 hand grenades and 32,000 artillery shells to the Kurdish forces. The armaments from Albania are particularly useful to the effort because they are compatible with the Kurds' Russian made weapons systems which make up the majority of their equipment.
- Turkey in early November 2014 began training Kurdish Peshmerga fighters in northern Iraq, Turkey and Peshmerga confirmed, 'as part of the struggle against ISIL', a Turkish official said.

=== U.S. troop presence ===
While some U.S. troops were already active in Iraq for several purposes since June 2014 (see section Background), on 13 August, the U.S. deployed another 130 military advisers to Northern Iraq, and up to 20 U.S. Marines and special forces servicemen landed on Mount Sinjar from CH-53E aircraft to coordinate the evacuation of Yazidi refugees. A team of British SAS was already in the area.

On 3 September, an increase of 350 servicemen was announced to be sent to Baghdad, increasing U.S. forces in Baghdad to 820, and increasing U.S. forces in Iraq to 1,213.

On 10 September, President Obama gave a speech in which he reiterated that American troops will not fight in combat. However, U.S. ground troops were still periodically engaged in combat with ISIL insurgents throughout the conflict. He also said that about 500 more troops will be sent to Iraq to help train Iraqi forces. At the end of September, Obama planned to send 1,600 troops to Iraq as "advisers" to the Iraqi army and Kurdish forces. 800 of them would provide security for soldiers and Marines and for property; hundreds would train and advise Iraqi and Kurdish forces on how to fight ISIL.

In early November 2014, President Obama announced that he would be doubling the number of U.S. troops present on the ground in Iraq to around 3,000 men. By early December 2014, the number of U.S. ground troops in Iraq had increased to 3,100, while other nations in the US-led Coalition decided to send 1,500 more ground troops to Iraq, increasing the total number of troops to 4,600.

In January 2015, the 1,000 Paratroopers of the "Panther Brigade" of the U.S. Army's 82nd Airborne Division were deployed to Iraq. They came with an additional 300 soldiers, Airmen, and Marines, bringing U.S. troop levels deployed in the country to 4,400.

According to The New York Times, by 4 February 2015, the U.S. had 4,500 troops in Iraq. Over the next two years, this number seemed to plateau at around 4,500. As of Sept 28, 2016, according to the DOD, the United States authorized additional troops for Iraq and Syria, for a total of 5,262.

With the arrival of the new Trump administration in January 2017, a change in policy was instituted regarding the disclosure of current troop levels as well as the timing of any additional deployments to the area, thus making good on his campaign promises to utilize the "element of surprise". As of April 2017, according to the Los Angeles Times, unbeknownst to both Congress and the general public, there had been two non-disclosed troop deployments in the month of March: a deployment of 400 U.S. Marines to northern Syria and 300 U.S. Army Paratroopers to the area around Mosul. As of 2 April 2017, the U.S. troop level, or "force management level"—the number of full-time troops deployed, was around 5,200 in Iraq and 500 in Syria, with about 1,000 more troops there on a temporary basis.

As of 2 July 2018, the U.S. still maintained a limited military presence of 5,000 troops stationed in Iraq with the task of helping train and assist Iraqi forces. The U.S. FY 2021 Overseas Contingency Operations (OCO) requested Counter-ISIS Train and Equip Fund (CTEF) of $645 million for operations in Iraq.

As of April 2020, U.S.-led coalition forces handed back four military bases to Iraqi forces.

The U.S. ended its combat mission in Iraq on 9 December 2021, leaving 2,500 troops in the country to serve as trainers and advisors to Iraqi security forces.

== Air operations ==
=== Types of aircraft used ===
In the first U.S. airstrikes on 8 August, armed drones as well as fixed wing aircraft: McDonnell Douglas F/A-18 Hornet fighters, were used. The F/A-18s were that day launched from the aircraft carrier USS George H.W. Bush. A Navy official said that the two planes involved in the airstrikes were Super Hornets from Carrier Air Wing 8, of Naval Air Station Oceana, Virginia. A number of Fairchild Republic A-10C Thunderbolt II's from the USAF's 163d Expeditionary Fighter Squadron were deployed on 17 November 2014.

=== Air bases and aircraft carriers ===
The following is a list of publicly disclosed air bases that have been used for the interventions in Iraq and Syria. It is likely that there are other, yet undisclosed air bases being used. Turkey initially refused to allow using Incirlik Air Base for airstrikes against ISIL, but changed their position in July 2015 when they allowed U.S. fighters to use both it and Diyarbakır.

- Ahmad al-Jaber Air Base, Kuwait
- Ali Al Salem Air Base, Kuwait (used by Denmark, Canada and Italy)
- Isa Air Base, Bahrain
- Al Dhafra Air Base, UAE (also used by France)
- Shaheed Mwaffaq Air Base, Jordan (also used by Belgium and Netherlands)
- RAF Akrotiri, Cyprus (used by United Kingdom)
- Al Udeid Air Base, Qatar (used by United Kingdom and United States. Operated by the Qatari Air Force)
- Al Minhad Air Base, UAE (also used by Australia)
- USS George H.W. Bush (CVN-77) in the Persian Gulf until mid October 2014
- USS Carl Vinson (CVN-70) deployed to the Persian Gulf from mid October 2014
- Cruise missiles have been launched from various American ships or submarines (against targets in Syria at least)

=== Airstrikes ===
- The United States began conducting airstrikes in Iraq on 8 August 2014. Fighter aircraft from the United States Air Force and United States Navy, and military "advisers" on the ground, have been involved in combating ISIL in northern Iraq, as well as in the north and west of Baghdad. Kurdish and Iraqi forces battling Islamic State fighters have been closely cooperating with U.S. air force controllers based in Baghdad and in Erbil, suggesting ISIL targets to those U.S. air force controllers. The U.S. controllers then checked those suggestions with live stream video information (ISR), to avoid hitting Iraqi or Kurdish forces with their airstrikes.
- Australia (Operation Okra)
  Australia's Prime Minister at the time, Tony Abbott, announced on 3 October 2014 that Australia would commence airstrikes on ISIL. At least until 2 November, dozens of those airstrikes held on, in at least some cases hitting and killing ISIL people, but also targeting military equipment and an oil refinery. The Australian government is reticent with giving detailed information, out of concern for possible propaganda from the side of ISIL.
- Canada (Operation Impact)
  On 7 October, the House of Commons voted in favour of Canadian airstrikes against ISIL, and approved of deploying six CF-18 fighter jets, an air-to-air refueling aircraft and two surveillance aircraft to participate in targeted airstrikes from an allied air base in Kuwait. The first Canadian airstrike took place on 2 November 2014, targeting construction equipment near Fallujah. The second airstrike was made on 11 November 2014, targeting ISIL artillery near Bayji, north of Baghdad.
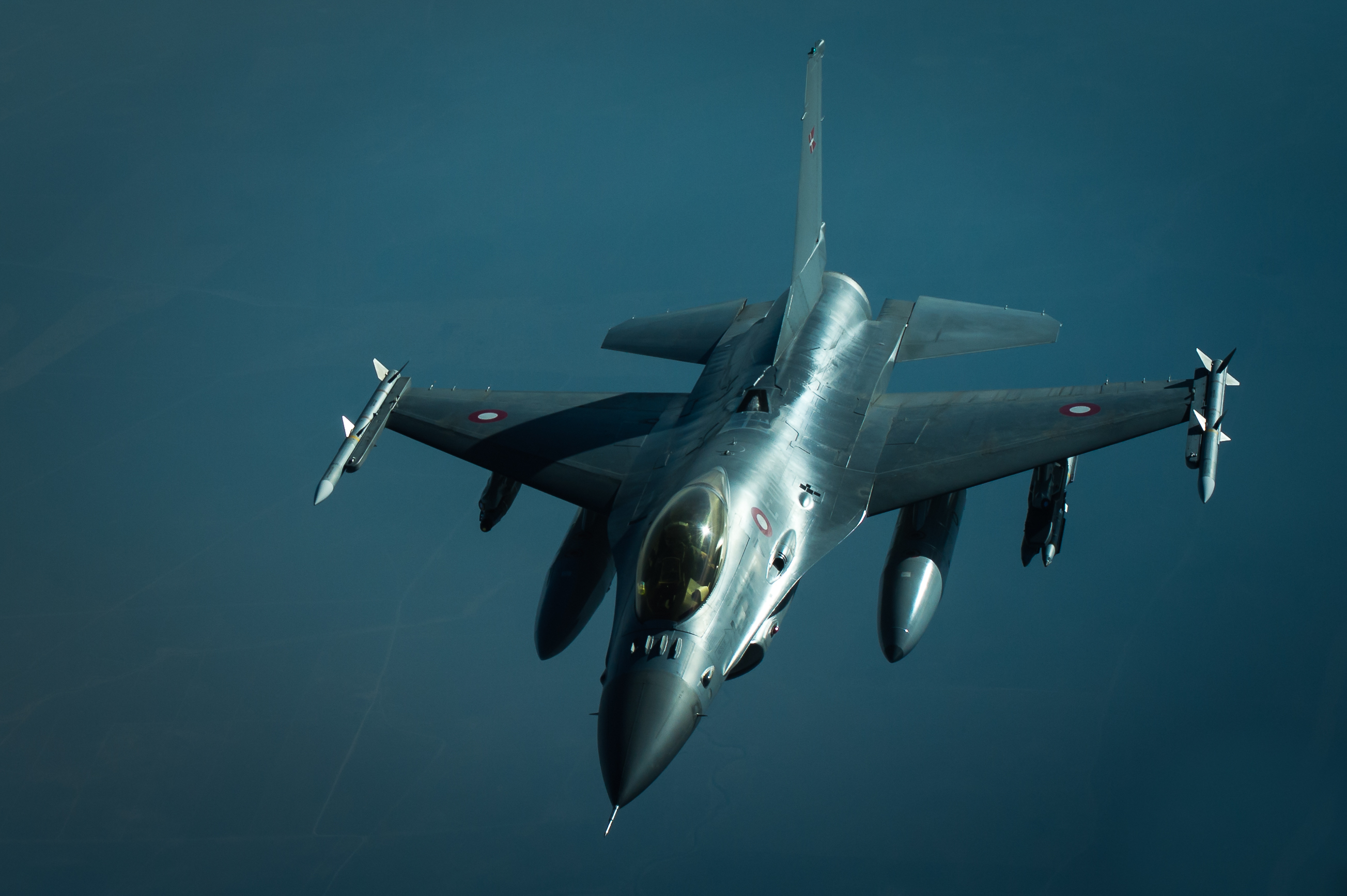
  A Royal Danish Air Force F-16, October 2016
- Denmark
  Danish Prime Minister Thorning-Schmidt promised 26 September 2014 to send four planes and three reserve jets (F-16s), with 250 pilots and staff, to launch airstrikes on ISIL in Iraq. The first mission by the Danish F-16s was flown on 16 October 2014. When the seven F-16s returned to Denmark in September 2015 for refitting and refurbishment, they had flown a total of 547 sorties against ISIL in Iraq. A C-130J transport aircraft used in support of coalition operations and a mobile radar station remained in action. In June 2016 the F-16s returned with a mission that had been expanded to include ISIL targets in both Iraq and Syria.
- France (Opération Chammal)
  On 15 September, Dassault Rafale fighter aircraft operating from the United Arab Emirates conducted reconnaissance flights on ISIL positions. On 19 September 2014, France conducted its first airstrike which targeted an ISIL depot, making it the first Western coalition partner to conduct airstrikes in Iraq.
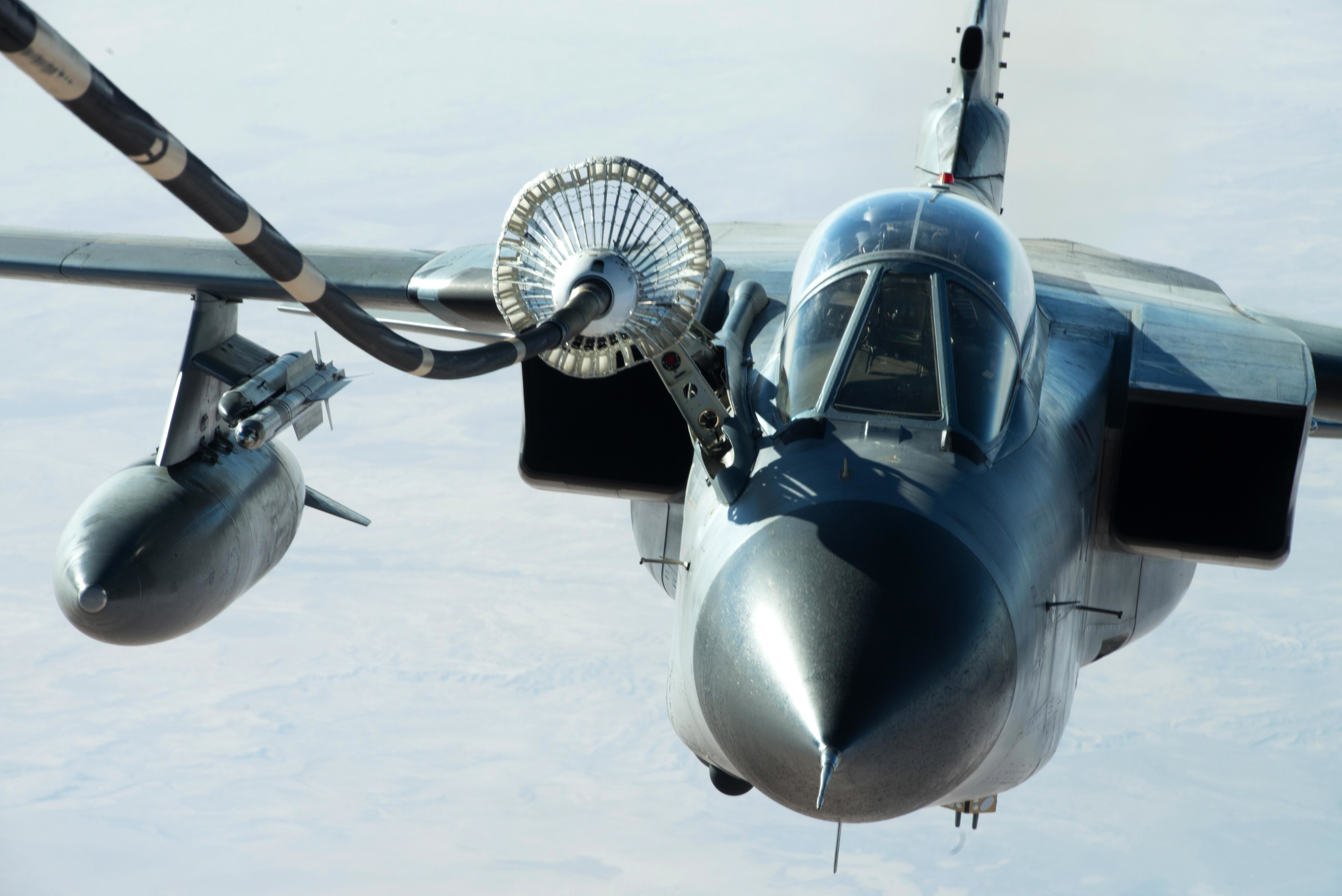
  A German Air Force Tornado ECR refuels near Mosul, November 2016
- Germany is supporting airstrikes against ISIL in Iraq and Syria with six Tornado reconnaissance aircraft and one Airbus A310 aerial refueling tanker aircraft. It also provides high resolution radar images by its SAR Lupe reconnaissance satellites.
- (Jordan) (See also: Jordanian intervention in the Syrian Civil War) Jordanian officials said on 4 February 2015, after the release of a video showing captured RJAF pilot Muath al-Kasasbeh being burned alive by his ISIL captors in Syria, that the kingdom would consider joining the coalition by launching airstrikes against ISIL targets in Iraq.
  The Jordanian Air Force on 4 February 2015 began targeting ISIL positions in Iraq in retaliation for ISIL's brutal burning of Jordanian pilot Muath al-Kasasbeh, beginning the campaign with a large airstrike campaign centered on Mosul, which killed 55 ISIL militants, including ISIL's top senior commander of Mosul known as the "Prince of Nineveh".
- Morocco in late November 2014, as the first Arab state joining this American-led military intervention in Iraq, responded to an American appeal to send several F-16 jets to the fight against ISIL. Four F-16 Fighting Falcon fighters from the Royal Moroccan Air Force reportedly carried out airstrikes against ISIL positions on the outskirts of Baghdad, among other areas, around 10 December 2014. The Moroccan warplanes were to focus on hitting fixed targets, including training camps, oil refineries, and weapons depots.
- United Kingdom (Operation Shader)
  The Royal Air Force began attacking targets in Iraq on 30 September, with six and then later eight, Tornado GR4 strike aircraft. Around four, and then later six, MQ-9 Reaper unmanned combat aerial vehicles also began attacking targets on 10 November 2014. Airstrikes have been supported by Boeing E-3 Sentry, Boeing RC-135 and Airbus Voyager aircraft. On 16 January 2015, Prime Minister David Cameron announced that the UK was the second-largest contributor to the anti-ISIL coalition in Iraq, contributing over 100 airstrikes. The majority of British forces engaged in Iraq operate from RAF Akrotiri in Cyprus, though MQ-9 Reapers are based in Kuwait and a RC-135 Rivet Joint is based at RAF Al Udeid in Qatar.

=== Facilitating or preparing for airstrikes ===
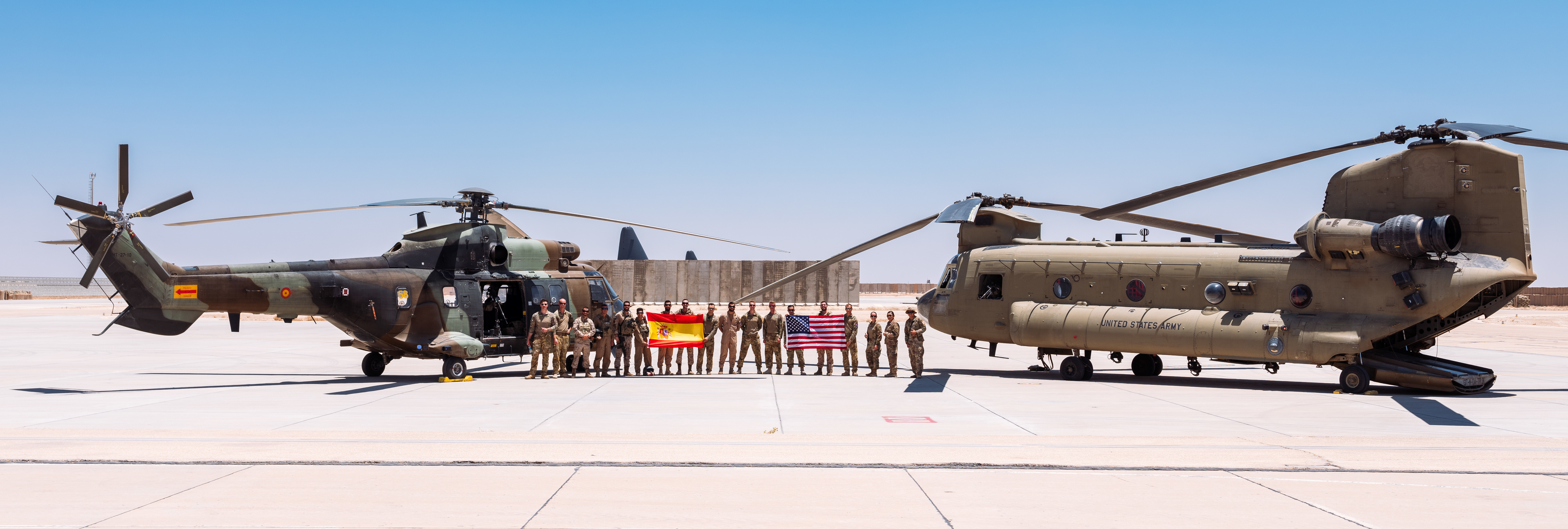
Spanish (Task Force Toro) and American (Task Force Phoenix) soldiers at Al Asad Airbase, June 2021

- Greece has served as a staging point for Belgian F-16s participating in airstrikes against ISIS.
- Italy has offered to assist coalition partners in air-to-air refueling and ISR operations with one KC-767, four Tornado IDS attack planes, and two UAVs Predators. Air operations continue.
- Spain had in September announced that its contribution to 'a US-led anti-IS coalition' would remain limited to weapons, transport assistance, etc., for the Iraqi government, but has in October offered to assist coalition partners in transport, air-to-air refueling and ISR operations.
- The Grand National Assembly of Turkey on 2 October allowed foreign soldiers to use Turkish bases for a fight against ISIL, after pressure from the U.S. government on Ankara to join the anti-ISIL coalition.

=== Airstrike campaigns in co-operation with other countries ===
- Belgium decided on 26 September 2014 that it would send six F-16 Fighting Falcons and a number of Lockheed C-130 Hercules cargo planes, supported by 120 pilots and other staff, to support the military effort against ISIL in Iraq. Belgian air forces operate from Shaheed Mwaffaq Air Base located in Jordan. On 5 October, a Belgian F-16 dropped its first bomb on an Islamic State target, east of Baghdad. The contribution towards striking ISIL positions was discontinued on 30 June 2015 due to financial restraints, however 35 military advisors still remain in the country as of November 2015. The withdrawn F-16 aircraft spent six months in Jordan before returning home. After this The Netherlands took over from Belgium. Currently Belgium is still active due The Netherlands being unable to honor their commitment to take over from Belgium on 1 July 2017, therefore the Belgium government decided to extend the operation until the end of 2017 after which The Netherlands will take over again from Belgium.
- The Netherlands (Dutch military intervention against the Islamic State)
  On 24 September 2014, the Dutch government decided to take part in "the military campaign" against ISIL which, as they claimed, had been started by the United States, and sent six F-16 fighter jets to Iraq to bomb ISIL. Their motivations to join this war: ISIL's advance in Iraq and Syria, while displaying "unprecedented violence" and "perpetrating terrible crimes against population groups", formed "a direct threat for that region"; ISIL's advance in Iraq and Syria "causes instability at the borders of Europe" which threatens "our own [Dutch] safety". Currently the Royal Netherlands Air Force is not active, normally they would switch with Belgium every 6 months but due unknown reasons they decided that they would not take over from Belgium on 1 July 2017. The Belgian airforce will continue until the end of 2017 after which the Dutch should take over again from Belgium.

== Timeline ==
=== U.S. surveillance and military advising in Iraq ===
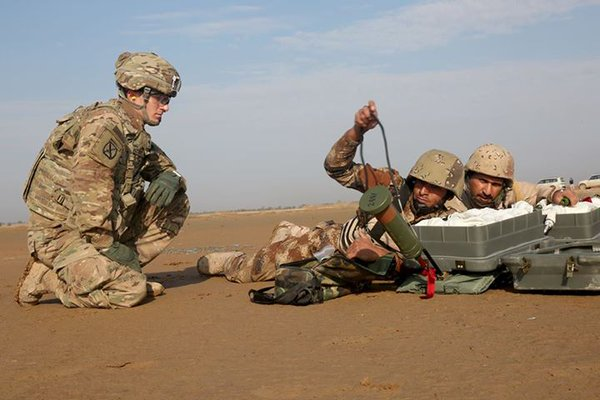
A U.S. Army soldier of the 10th Mountain Division advises & assists Iraqi soldiers during a training exercise at Besmaya Range Complex, Iraq, 10 November 2015

At the invitation of the Iraqi Government, on 15 June 2014 President Obama ordered dozens of United States troops to Iraq in response to offensives by ISIL (see previous section 'Background'), to assess Iraqi forces and the ISIL threat. Obama sent a total of 275 troops to provide support and security for U.S. personnel and the U.S. Embassy in Baghdad, following the capture of Mosul by ISIS.

Probably between 15 and 26 June, the U.S. also began to fly missions with crewed aircraft over Iraq in secret.

On 26 June 2014, the U.S. started to survey over Baghdad also with armed drones "primarily" for protection of 180 U.S. military advisers in the area.

On 29–30 June 2014, the U.S. increased the number of its troops in Iraq from 180 to 480, to prevent ISIL from taking control of Baghdad International Airport, which the U.S. said would be critical to any evacuation of Americans from Baghdad, and to protect U.S. citizens and property.

In July, Obama announced that due to the continuing violence in Iraq and the growing influence of non-state actors such as the Islamic State of Iraq and the Levant, the United States would elevate its security commitment in the region. Approximately 800 U.S. troops secured American installations like the Embassy in Baghdad and the Consulate in Erbil.

Around 13 July, a classified military report concluded that many Iraqi army units were deeply infiltrated by either Sunni extremist informants or Shiite personnel backed by Iran, which would bring Americans advisors to Iraqi forces into danger.

Around 5 August, the U.S. military forces in Iraq were acting to "assess and to advise Iraqi security forces as they confront ISIL and the complex security situation on the ground."

=== ISIL conquests and massacres; U.S. reaction ===
During the first 15 days of August 2014, ISIL expanded its territories in northern Iraq. On 3 August, they conquered Sinjar and surrounding area, including Wana and Zumar, killing possibly 2,000 Yazidi men in the Sinjar massacre.

On 7 August, ISIL conquered Qaraqosh, the largest Christian town in Iraq, and neighbouring towns, causing 100,000 civilians to flee from ISIL troops.

In reaction, on 5 August, the Iraqi military started dropping food and water for the tens of thousands of Yazidis stranded in the Sinjar mountains, and the U.S. started directly supplying Iraqi Kurds with weapons to fight ISIL. On 7 August the U.S. also started dropping food and water for the Yazidi Kurdish civilians trapped in the Sinjar Mountains

=== Obama's decision for airstrikes ===
President Obama makes a statement on Iraq and dealing with ISIL, 7 August 2014.

On the evening of 7 August 2014, U.S. President Barack Obama gave a live address to the nation. He described the recent ISIL advances across Iraq and said that ISIL's persecution and threatening the extinction of Yazidis, a religious minority in northern Iraq, including especially the Yazidis who had fled into the Sinjar Mountains, in particular had convinced him that U.S. military action was necessary. The President said that he had ordered airstrikes:

- to protect American diplomats, civilians and military in Erbil at the American consulate or advising Iraqi forces;
- to prevent a potential massacre (genocide) by ISIL on thousands of Yazidis on Mount Sinjar; and
- to stop ISIL's advance on Erbil, the capital of the Kurdistan Region where the U.S. had a consulate and a joint operations center with the Iraqi military.

Obama further defended his decision by saying:

...the world is confronted by many challenges. And while America has never been able to right every wrong, America has made the world a more secure and prosperous place. And our leadership is necessary to underwrite the global security and prosperity that our children and our grandchildren will depend upon. We do so by adhering to a set of core principles. We do whatever is necessary to protect our people. We support our allies when they're in danger. We lead coalitions of countries to uphold international norms. And we strive to stay true to the fundamental values -- the desire to live with basic freedom and dignity -- that is common to human beings wherever they are. That's why people all over the world look to the United States of America to lead. And that's why we do it.

The U.S. also started considering an operation with American ground troops to rescue the Yazidis in those Sinjar Mountains.

=== First U.S. airstrikes in the Erbil and Sinjar areas ===
U.S. Navy F/A-18 fighters bomb Islamic State artillery targets on 8 August 2014.

On Friday, 8 August 2014, U.S. Navy F-18 Hornet fighters used 500-pound laser-guided bombs to strike an ISIL towed artillery piece shelling Erbil, and four U.S. fighters later bombed ISIL military convoys, some of them advancing towards the Kurdish forces defending Erbil. Another round of U.S. airstrikes in the afternoon struck 8 ISIL targets near Erbil. Predator drones as well as fixed wing F-18 aircraft were used in the U.S. attacks.

On 8 and 9 August, Obama extended the purposes of the airstrikes of 8 August as to be: 1.) protecting Americans in Iraq; 2.) helping Iraqi minorities stranded on Mount Sinjar; 3.) "break the siege of Mount Sinjar"; 4.) preventing massacres (genocides) on Yazidis and other minority groups as announced by ISIL; and 5.) helping Iraqis combat the threat from ISIL.

On Saturday, 9 August, U.S. forces launched 4 airstrikes against ISIL fighters threatening civilians on Mount Sinjar, this time primarily aimed at armored fighting vehicles. A combination of U.S. warplanes and drones destroyed four armored personnel carriers. The U.S. airstrikes that day killed 16 ISIL fighters, Iraqi officials reported.

On 10 August, U.S. forces launched a series of 5 air attacks which targeted ISIL armed vehicles as well as a mortar position. Assisted by these U.S. air attacks, Iraqi Kurdish forces claimed to have recaptured the Northern Iraqi towns of Makhmur and Gweyr from ISIL control. An Iraqi airstrike conducted 9–11 August in Sinjar killed 45 ISIL militants, Iraqi officials reported. On 10 August, also the United Kingdom started with humanitarian airdrops for the—initially 50,000—Yazidis stranded in the Sinjar Mountains.

Between 9 and 13 August, the Kurds and Americans enabled possibly 35,000 to 45,000 of the Yazidis stranded in the Sinjar Mountains to escape or be evacuated into Syria (see Sinjar massacre#Refugee crisis in the Sinjar Mountains).

On Monday, 11 August, Lt. Gen. William Mayville Jr., director of the U.S. operations, said the airstrikes since 7 August near Irbil and Mount Sinjar had slowed ISIL's operational tempo and temporarily disrupted their advances toward Irbil. On 12 August, the U.S. carried out airstrikes against ISIL mortar positions north of Sinjar after ISIL had been firing on Kurdish forces protecting the Yazidis in the area.

On 13 August, the U.S. government concluded that the situation of the remaining Yazidis in the Sinjar Mountains was "much more manageable" and less life-threatening, and that an American rescue operation was therefore not acutely necessary. Presumably a few thousand or between 5,000 and 10,000 Yazidis still remained in those mountains.

=== Retaking Mosul Dam ===
On 16 August, U.S. drones and warplanes began a close air campaign aimed at supporting the advance of Kurdish fighters moving toward the Mosul Dam. Kurdish sources commented that this was the "heaviest U.S. bombing of militant positions since the start of air strikes." On 16 August there were 9 U.S. airstrikes in northern Iraq, on 17 August 2014.

U.S. President Obama, in a letter to Congress on 17 August, explained this use of U.S. Forces as support to the Iraqi forces' campaign against terrorist group ISIL. Obama said on 18 August that Kurdish Peshmerga fighters and Iraqi troops, with help from the U.S., had retaken the Mosul Dam from ISIL.

=== Timeline ===
==== 2014 ====
===== September 2014 =====
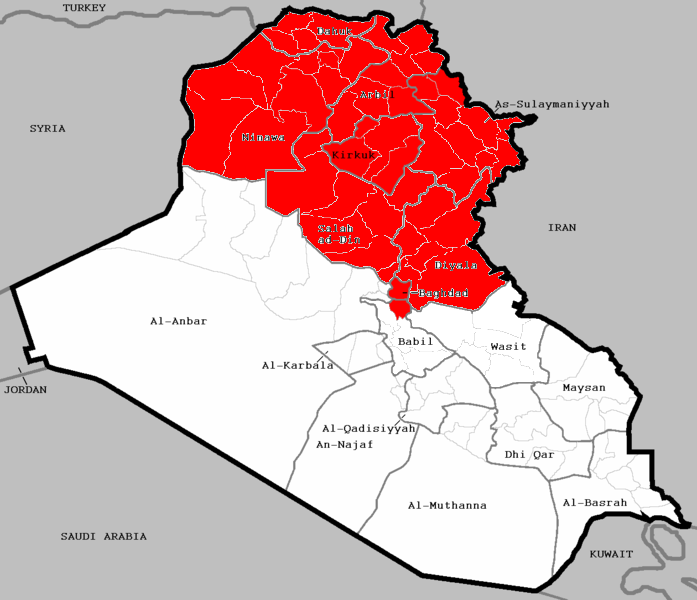
Locations where the U.S. bombed ISIL in Iraq (between 8 August and 16 September.)

On 8 September, the Iraqi Army with close air support from U.S. F-18 aircraft managed to retake the key Haditha Dam. Following the recapture, Iraqi troops moved on to recapture the town of Barwana. Iraqi state television reported that 15 ISIL militants were killed in the battle. Following the Iraqi victory, ISIL responded with the public execution of David Haines.

On 18 September, France decided to initiate airstrikes on ISIL as well (see Opération Chammal).

Around 23 September, Lloyd Austin, the general in charge of U.S. Central Command, has been confirmed to be the top officer in charge of the campaign against the ISIL in Iraq and Syria.

On 24 September, the Dutch government decided to send six Fighter jets to contribute to the "international battle against ISIS (ISIL)" (see section 'Airstrikes').

On 26 September, the British Parliament decided to authorize British airstrikes on ISIL as well. Britain then announced to cooperate with Iraqi and Kurdish intelligence agencies (see Operation Shader). Also the Belgian Parliament that day decided to start airstrikes on ISIL (see section 'Airstrikes').

Around 28 September 2014, airstrikes by the U.S.-led coalition together with Iraqi Army ground forces clashing with ISIL militants halted an ISIL offensive by Amariya al-Falluja, 40 km (25 miles) west of Baghdad, the Iraqi capital, a BBC reporter on the spot reported.

On 30 September, the U.S. launched eleven airstrikes in Iraq and the UK conducted their first two airstrikes in Iraq in this intervention. Together with eleven U.S. strikes in Syria against ISIL these 24 strikes were the highest number of strikes against ISIL on one day since 8 August.

By the end of September 2014, the United States Navy and Air Force had conducted 240 airstrikes in Iraq and Syria, as well as 1,300 tanker refueling missions, totaling 3,800 sorties by all types of aircraft.

===== October 2014 =====
On 3 October 2014, the Australian government authorized airstrikes on ISIL in Iraq (see Operation Okra). On 2 October, Denmark's Parliament authorized airstrikes on ISIL in Iraq (see section 'Airstrikes').
On 7 October, the Canadian Parliament voted in favour of Canadian airstrikes against ISIL (see Operation Impact).
On 11 October, 10,000 ISIL troops headed from Mosul and Syria toward the Iraqi capital city of Baghdad, and ISIL stood on the verge of taking the whole of Al Anbar Governorate just west of Baghdad. The provincial council's deputy head, Al-Issawi, said they then requested Iraq's government to ask the U.S. to bring in ground forces; the Iraqi government however squarely denied having received such demand from Anbar. 12 October, ISIL came within 25 km (15.5 miles) of the Baghdad airport, U.S. General Dempsey reported. The U.S. then deployed low-flying Apache attack helicopters to keep ISIL at bay.

By 22 October, the U.S. had spent $424 million on both of its bombing campaigns against ISIL in Iraq and Syria.

===== November 2014 =====
Late November 2014, Morocco responded to an American appeal and sent several F-16 jets to fight against ISIL.

===== December 2014 =====
During the early morning hours of 14 December, U.S. ground forces allegedly clashed with ISIL alongside the Iraqi Army and Tribal Forces near Ein al-Asad base, west of Anbar, in an attempt to repel them from the base of which includes about 100 U.S. advisers in it, when ISIL attempted to overrun the base. A field commander of the Iraqi Army in Al Anbar Governorate, said that "the U.S. force equipped with light and medium weapons, supported by F-18, was able to inflict casualties against fighters of ISIL organization, and forced them to retreat from the al-Dolab area, which lies 10 kilometers from Ain al-Assad base." Sheikh Mahmud Nimrawi, a prominent tribal leader in the region, added that "U.S. forces intervened because of ISIL started to come near the base, which they are stationed in so out of self-defense," he responded, welcoming the U.S. intervention, and saying "which I hope will not be the last." This was said to be the first encounter between the United States and the Islamic State, in four years, though this claim has been stated to be "false" by the Pentagon.

In the Kurdish Sinjar offensive, 17–22 December, Kurdish troops, aided by U.S. airstrikes, connected the Sinjar Mountains to Peshmerga territory, enabling the Yazidis who stayed on the mountains to be evacuated. On 22 December, Kurdish Peshmerga forces pushed into the city of Sinjar, taking control of much of the city.

On 25 December 2014, Hassan Saeed Al-Jabouri, the ISIL governor of Mosul, who was also known as Abu Taluut, was killed by a US-led Coalition airstrike in Mosul. It was also revealed that the U.S. planned to retake the city of Mosul in January 2015.

==== 2015 ====
===== January 2015 =====
In mid-January 2015, Canadian soldiers at the front lines between Iraqi and ISIL troops exchanged fire with ISIL fighters. Canadians were not hurt, but they "neutralized" an unknown number of ISIL militants.

On 20 January 2015, the SOHR reported that al-Baghdadi, the leader of ISIL, had been wounded in an airstrike in Al-Qa'im, an Iraqi border town held by ISIL, and as a result, withdrew to Syria.

On 21 January 2015, the U.S. began coordinating airstrikes with a Kurdish launched offensive, to help them begin the planned operation to retake the city of Mosul.

On 29 January 2015, Canadian special forces in Iraq came under fire from ISIL forces, causing the Canadian troops to return fire, killing some ISIL militants.

===== February 2015 =====
Jordan, which had been conducting airstrikes on ISIL in Syria since September 2014, initiated airstrikes on ISIL targets in Iraq on 4 February 2015 (see details in the Airstrikes section).

On 17 February, it was revealed that ISIL had launched another major assault on Erbil, coming within 45 kilometres (28 mi) of the city.

By late February, it was reported that ISIL was beginning to use chemical weapons, due to the gradual weakening of the organization, and that the Iraqi Army was expected to join the Liberation of Mosul sometime in April 2015.

===== March 2015 =====
At the beginning of March, the Iraqi government announced that they would soon launch a military operation with the Kurdish Peshmerga and other allies to regain the city of Mosul, which was under ISIL control since 10 June 2014. On 10 March, U.S.-led warplanes dropped scraps of paper in Mosul, advising residents to evacuate the city and stay away from ISIL locations, because of those imminent military operations.

On 11 March 2015, ISIL threatened over loudspeakers to behead any civilian who tries to leave Mosul.

18 March 2015 Coalition airstrike at the al-Baaj District, in the Nineveh Governorate, near the Syrian border. It was reported that his wounds were so serious that the top ISIL leaders had a meeting to discuss who would replace him if he died. By 21 April, al-Bagdadi reportedly had not yet recovered enough from his injuries to resume daily control of ISIL.

On 25 March 2015, the American-led Coalition joined the Second Battle of Tikrit, launching its first airstrikes on ISIL targets in the city center. That night, U.S. aircraft carried out 17 airstrikes in the center of Tikrit, which struck an ISIL building, two bridges, three checkpoints, two staging areas, two berms, a roadblock, and a command and control facility. The US-led Coalition continued conducting airstrikes in Tikrit until 31 March, when Iraqi forces entered the city center.

===== April 2015 =====
On 8 April 2015, Iraqi forces, building on their advances in the Saladin Governorate, launched an offensive to liberate the Anbar Governorate from ISIL occupation, beginning with an offensive in the region around east Ramadi, backed by Coalition aircraft. In retaliation, ISIL executed 300 people in the western Anbar Province. It was also reported that 10,000 Sunni tribal fighters would participate in the Anbar offensive.

On 12 April, the Iraqi government declared that Tikrit was free of ISIL forces, stating that it was safe for residents to return home. Despite this, many refugees from Tikrit still feared returning to the city. On 12 April, Abu Maria, the top ISIL leader in Tikrit, was killed by Iraqi forces at the Ajeel Oil Field near Tikrit, along with his top aide, after they were both caught trying to flee from the city. Reports revealed that ISIL resistance persisted until 17 April.

By mid-April 2015, ISIL had lost 25–30%, 5,000 to 6,500 square miles, in Iraq since their peak territorial influence in August 2014 to Iraqi and American coalition forces, leaving them still possessing 15,000 square miles in Iraq.

On 17 April, Iraqi forces in Tikrit located and killed 130 ISIL sleeper agents, finally ending the Second Battle of Tikrit. Following this, cleanup operations to remove the 5,000–10,000 IEDs left behind by ISIL were expected to take several months.

On 22 April 2015 Iraqi government sources reported that Abu Alaa Afri, the self-proclaimed Caliph's deputy and a former Iraqi physics teacher, had been installed as the stand-in leader while Baghdadi recuperates from his injuries.

===== May 2015 =====
On 3 May 2015, The Guardian reported that ISIL leader Abu Bakr al-Baghdadi was recovering from severe injuries he received from an 18 March 2015 airstrike, in a part of Mosul. It was also reported that al-Baghdadi's spinal injury, which left him incapacitated, means that he may never be able to fully resume direct command of ISIL.

According to the Iraqi defence ministry Abu Ala al-Afri, ISIL's Deputy Leader, was killed on 12 May 2015, in a US-led Coalition airstrike on a mosque in Tal Afar, where al-Afri was holding a meeting with other ISIL senior leaders. Akram Qirbash, ISIL's top judge, was also killed in the airstrike. The U.S. Defense Department said that it could not corroborate the report.

===== August 2015 =====
In August 2015, fifty intelligence analysts working for United States Central Command (CENTCOM) complained to the Pentagon's Inspector General and the media, alleging that CENTCOM's senior leadership was altering or distorting intelligence reports on the Islamic State of Iraq and the Levant (ISIL) to paint a more optimistic picture of the ongoing war against ISIL forces in Iraq and Syria. They were subsequently joined by civilian and Defense Intelligence Agency analysts working for CENTCOM. Members of the groups began anonymously leaking details of the case to the press in late-August. In February 2017, the Inspector General of the United States Department of Defense completed its investigation and cleared the senior leadership of CENTCOM, concluding that "allegations of intelligence being intentionally altered, delayed or suppressed by top CENTCOM officials from mid-2014 to mid-2015 were largely unsubstantiated."

===== October 2015 =====
On 17 October 2015, an MQ-1B Predator drone from 20th Attack Squadron, 432nd Wing, USAF, crashed after "experiencing electronic systems failure and loss of control due to a lightning strike" southeast of Baghdad; the drone was destroyed on impact.

On 22 October 2015 during 30 U.S. special forces from Delta Force and members of a Kurdish Counter-terrorism unit conducted a raid on an ISIL prison compound 7 kilometres (4.3 mi) North of the town of Hawija in Iraq's Kirkuk province. The raid liberated approximately 70 hostages, including more than 20 members of the Iraqi Security Forces. Kurdistan Region asked U.S. special operations forces to support an operation to free hostages that were being held inside the prison and were going to be executed, Master Sergeant Joshua Wheeler was killed in the raid, he was the first American service member killed in action as a result of enemy fire while fighting ISIL and at the time he was the first American to be killed in action in Iraq since November 2011.

==== 2016 ====
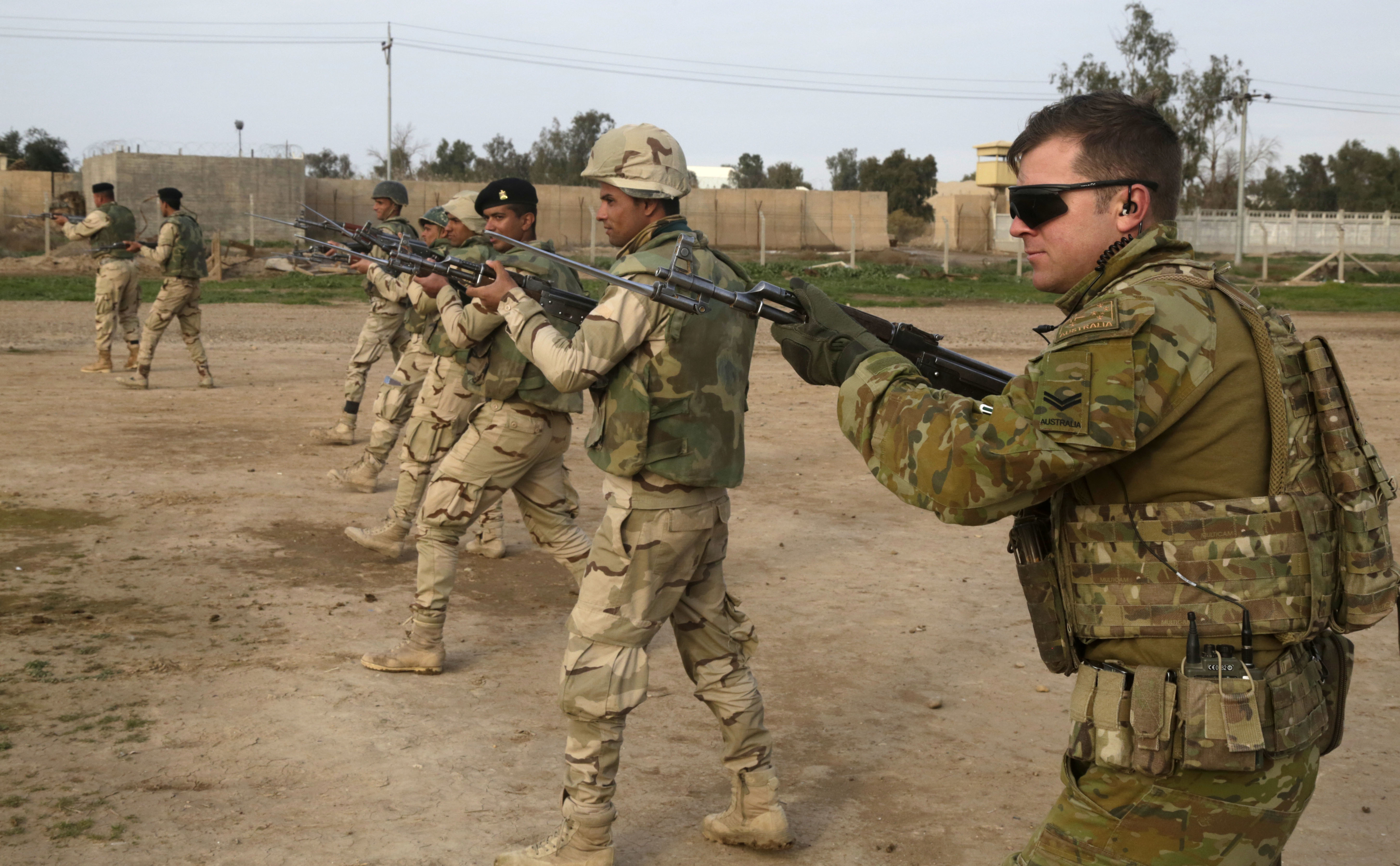
An Australian soldier conducts bayonet training alongside Iraqi soldiers at Camp Taji, January 2016

===== January 2016 =====
The US-led coalition began targeting the IS chemical weapons infrastructure with airstrikes and special forces raids, the coalition is focusing on destroying laboratories and equipment, whilst further special forces raids are planned to target IS chemical weapons experts.

===== February 2016 =====
US officials reported that Delta Force operatives have carried out operations to target, capture or kill top ISIL operatives in Iraq, reportedly beginning in late February 2016, after several weeks of covert preparation such as setting up safe houses, establishing informant networks and coordinating operations with Iraqi and Peshmerga units. The Delta Force operators are part of an Expeditionary Targeting Force that is also made up of operators from the U.S. military's "Tier One" Special Operations units, numbering around 200 personnel. Their main objectives are to gather enough intelligence from raids on terrorist-occupied compounds and hideouts, then from intelligence gathered at those sites they will give the ETF more intelligence about ISIL networks and quickly attack additional and related targets, in what's known as "targeted" missions. This strategy was tested during the May 2015 raid on Deir Ezzor in Syria. The ETF has so far collected enough intelligence about ISIL operations in Iraq in up to half a dozen locations that raids and field operations are ready to take place. In late-February, U.S. special forces captured Sleiman Daoud al-Afari, an ISIL senior chemical weapons engineer, in a raid in Badoosh, north-west of Mosul, there were no U.S. casualties. Afari's capture is the first known major success of this new strategy.

===== March 2016 =====
On 1 March 2016, a U.S. special operations assault force captured an ISIL operative during a raid in northern Iraq and is expected to apprehend and interrogate a number of others in coming months.

On 19 March, Staff Sergeant Louis F. Cardin, a field artilleryman with the Battalion Landing Team, 2nd Battalion 6th Marines, 26th Marine Expeditionary Unit, was killed by an ISIL rocket attack on Firebase Bell near Makhmur, 8 other Marines were also injured, the Marines returned fire with their artillery. The Marines from the 26th MEU first began moving into the area just 2 weeks before, deploying from the USS Kearsarge. The base will be used by the U.S. military to support the Iraqi 15th Division when they attempt to retake Mosul and the Marines had finished setting up and testing their howitzers just 2 or 3 days before the attack. The joint taskforce overseeing the campaign against ISIL announced it was deploying additional Marines from the 26th MEU to Iraq to join the roughly 3,700 U.S. troops already deployed there to combat ISIS. There are already more than 4,000 Marines and sailors who have been deployed to Iraq since October.

===== April 2016 =====
On 18 April 2016, U.S. Special forces and Kurdish forces launched a raid on Hammam al-'Alil which killed Salman Abu Shabib al-Jebouri; a senior IS commander who was a leading member of the IS military council, two of his aides were also killed. U.S. Defence Secretary Ash Carter announced that the U.S. is to send 200 extra troops; the majority of them being special forces and 8 Apache attack helicopters to Iraq, the remainder will include trainers, security forces for the advisers, and maintenance crews for the Apaches, increasing the number of U.S. personnel in the country to around 4,100. The U.S. also plans to give Kurdish Peshmerga forces, more than $400m in assistance.

On 25 April, a U.S. warplane dropped a guided bomb that destroyed an SUV occupied by IS leader Raphael Saihou Hostey near Mosul, Hostey was a recruiter for IS, U.S. drone operators had been stalking him for days before the order came to kill him.

===== May 2016 =====
On 3 May 2016, Special Warfare Operator 1st Class Charles Keating IV; a U.S. Navy SEAL, was killed by small arms fire during an ISIL assault on a Peshmerga position, approximately 3 to 5 kilometers behind enemy lines, near the town of Tel Skuf, 28–30 km north of Mosul, the SEAL killed was part of a 30-man SEALs unit deployed to Iraq as part of a special forces advise and assist mission. 125 ISIL militants broke into the position using three truck bombs followed by bulldozers which cleared the wreckage away, the U.S. responded with 11 aircraft; F-15s F-16s, A-10s, B-52s and 2 drones carrying out 31 airstrikes; which destroyed two more truck bombs stopping the attack, 58 militants were killed and more than 20 of their vehicles were also destroyed, Keating was part of a Navy SEAL quick reaction force called in by the Peshmerga. The IS attack is part of their attacks on multiple fronts overnight to obtain new ground, Iraqi military sources said that special forces had foiled an attack by five suicide bombers in the village of Khirbirdan and Peshmerga forces repelled an IS assault on Wardak. U.S. Army Colonel Steve Warren labeled the offensive as one of the most complex battlefield operations launched by ISIL since December 2015.

As of early May 2016, there are more than 5,500 U.S. military personnel in Iraq; 3,870 are deployed to advise and assist local forces fighting IS militants, the rest includes special operations personnel, logistics workers and troops on temporary rotations.

Small teams of American advisers operate from northern Iraq and Iraqi Kurdistan, providing commanders with help in military planning and logistical support. They have moved about freely to interact with commanders in the field as long as they remain well behind front lines, in the case of the firefight at Tel Skuf, a dozen U.S. troops who were advising and assisting the Peshmerga happened to be at an outpost behind the front lines that had been targeted by the large ISIL force.

On 6 May, a U.S. airstrike killed Abu Wahib, a senior IS leader in Anbar, as well as 3 other ISIL militants in a vehicle in Ar-Rutbah.

On 17 May, the ISF took control of the city Ar-Rutbah. ISIL lost control of the strategically important town and Anbar's mostly control.

On 25 May, during Operation Breaking Terrorism, U.S. airstrikes killed the commander of Daesh forces in Fallujah; Maher al-Bilawai in Fallujah.

In late May, a U.S. special forces operator was indirectly wounded in an ISIL attack near Irbil.

===== June 2016 =====
On 12 June, a U.S. Apache attack helicopter carried out a strike that destroyed an ISIL car bomb near Qayyarah, 50 miles south of Mosul in support of Iraqi forces positioning ahead of an operation to retake Mosul from insurgents. It was the first time since President Obama authorized the helicopters' use in offensive operations earlier this year.

On 25 June, a U.S. airstrike near Mosul killed 2 senior ISIL commanders: one was Basim Muhammad Ahmad Sultan al-Bajari, ISIL' deputy minister of war, who oversaw ISIS' efforts to capture Mosul in June 2014 and consolidated ISIL's control over Mosul, he also led the ISIL Jaysh al-Dabiq battalion known for using vehicle-borne IEDs, suicide bombers and mustard gas in its attacks. The other was Hatim Talib al-Hamduni, a military commander in the area and head of military police for self-proclaimed Ninawa state; together, they engaged in dictatorial rule and sectarian murder and oppression since 2014.

On 29 June, in support of the 2016 Abu Kamal offensive—the offensive by the Syrian rebels from different factions that aims to capture Abu Kamal in Syria and effectively split its territorial holdings in two and preventing the transfer of fighters and weapons between the two countries—on the Iraqi side of the border, U.S.-led coalition conducted five airstrikes near al-Qaim. Also that day in Fallujah, US-led coalition aircraft—including Iraqi aircraft, conducted airstrikes that killed at least 250 ISIL militants. Whilst Iraqi Security Forces fought them on the ground; the first strikes targeted a convoy of IS fighters trying to leave a neighborhood on the outskirts of southern Fallujah, destroying between 40 and 55 IS vehicles. A second convoy formed east of Ramadi later that day, coalition and Iraqi jets launched more strikes, destroying nearly 120 ISIL vehicles, but in both attacks, Iraqi Security Forces destroyed more. The figure of ISIL vehicles destroyed rose up to nearly 800—Iraq's Joint Operations Command said the country's forces destroyed 603 IS vehicles, whilst the Pentagon estimated that coalition strikes hit at least 175, but those figures could not be independently confirmed.

===== July 2016 =====
On 11 July, Secretary of Defense Ash Carter announced that the U.S. is sending 560 additional U.S. military personnel to Iraq, bringing the number of U.S. personnel in Iraq to about 4,650. They will be stationed at Qayyara airbase, which was recaptured on 9 July by Iraqi government forces being supported by U.S.-led airstrikes; most of them will serve in training and advisory roles, including engineers and logistics experts and with the airbase as a key staging area, they will assist local forces in the retaking of the IS stronghold of Mosul. Also, a new "Nineveh Liberation Operations Center" has been set up to coordinate the offensive, complete with dozens of U.S. and British advisers.

===== August 2016 =====
On 5 August, the Pentagon announced about 400 U.S. soldiers would deploy south of Mosul to Qayarah airbase to aid in the operation to retake Mosul.

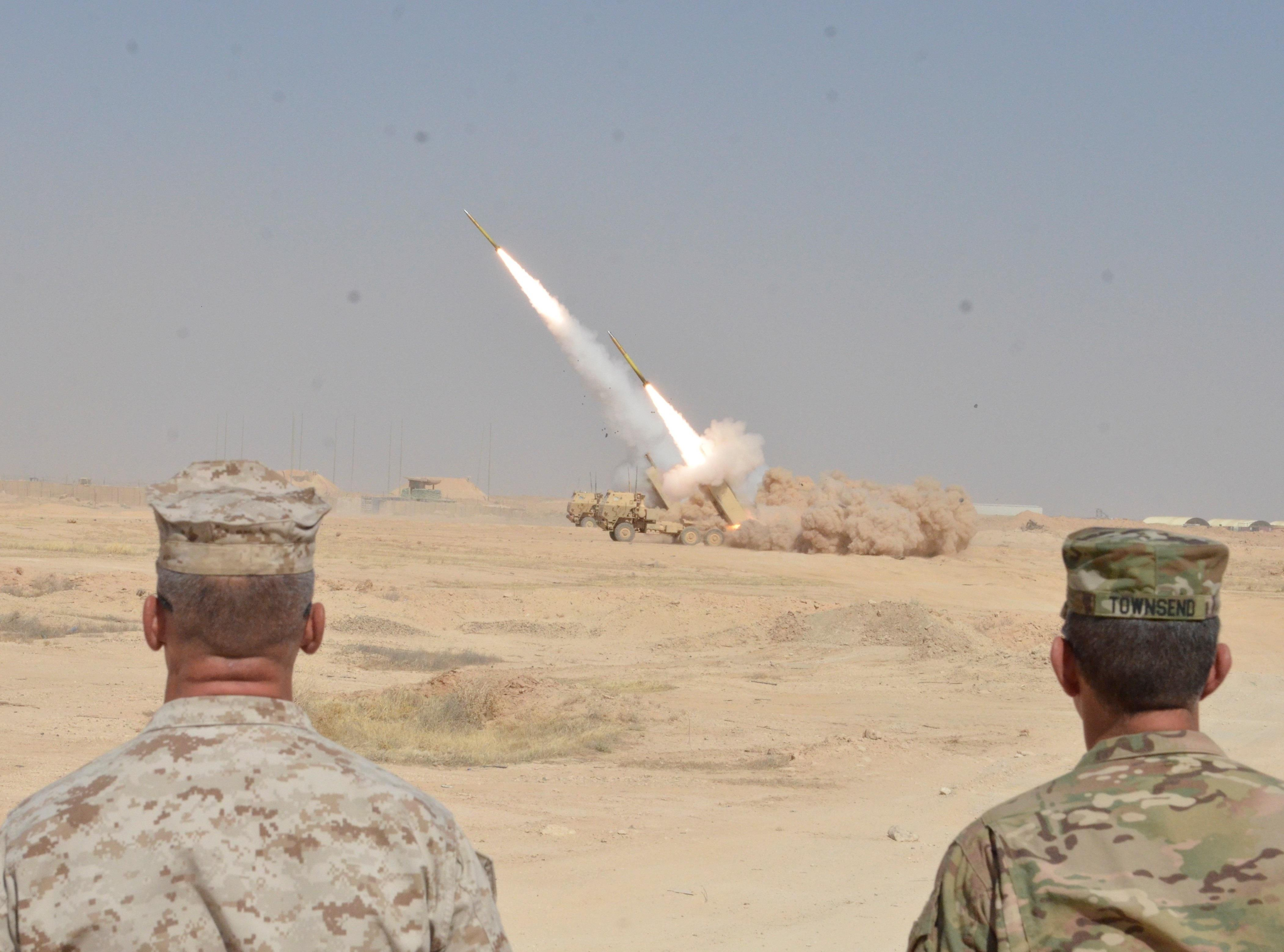
General Stephen J. Townsend observes a HIMARS strike that destroyed a building near Haditha, September 2016

===== September 2016 =====
On 28 September, The New York Times reported that U.S. officials said President Obama had authorized the sending of an additional 600 U.S. troops to Iraq to assist Iraqi forces in the upcoming battle to retake Mosul from IS.

===== October 2016 =====
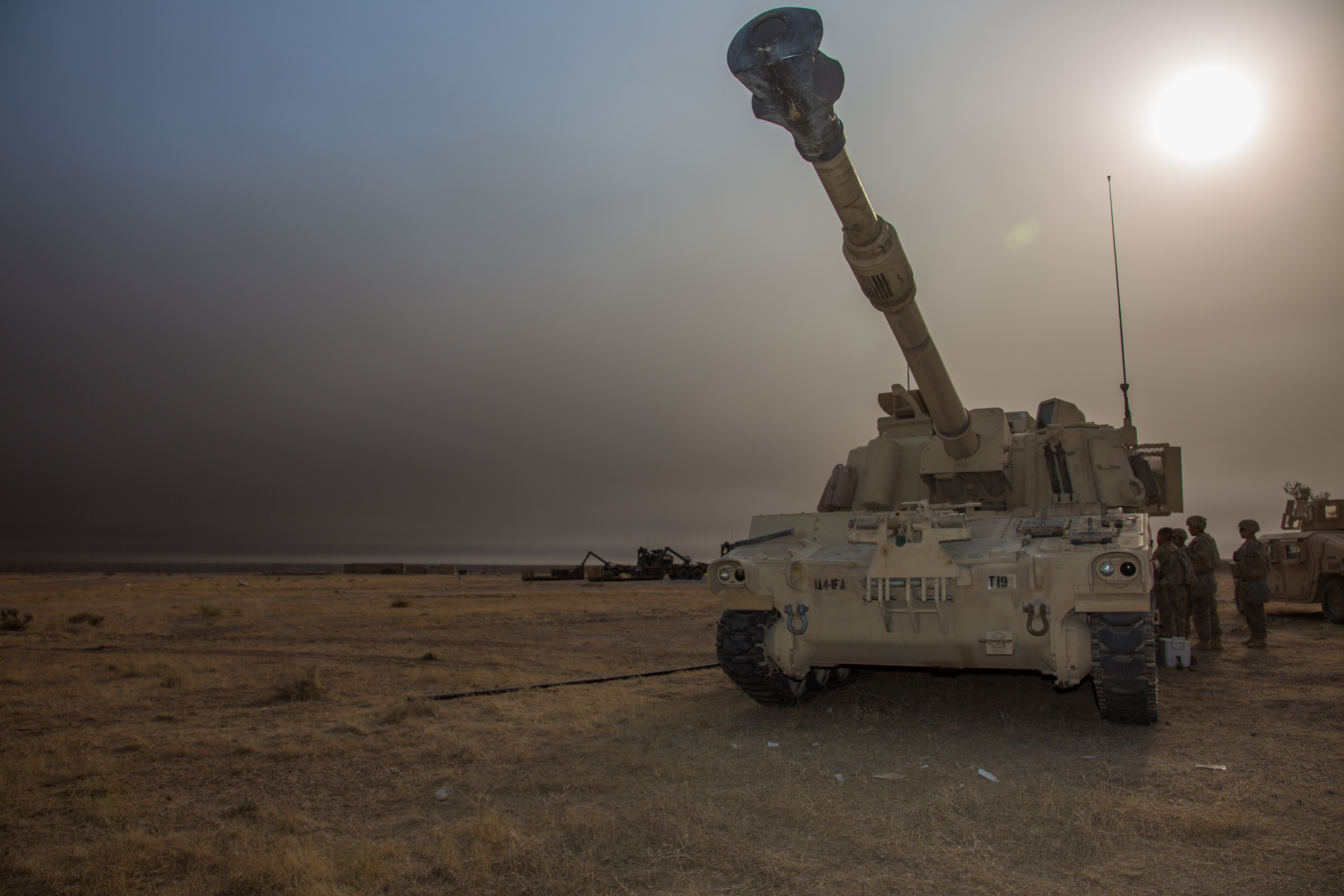
A U.S. Army M109A6 Paladin near Mosul, 16 October 2016

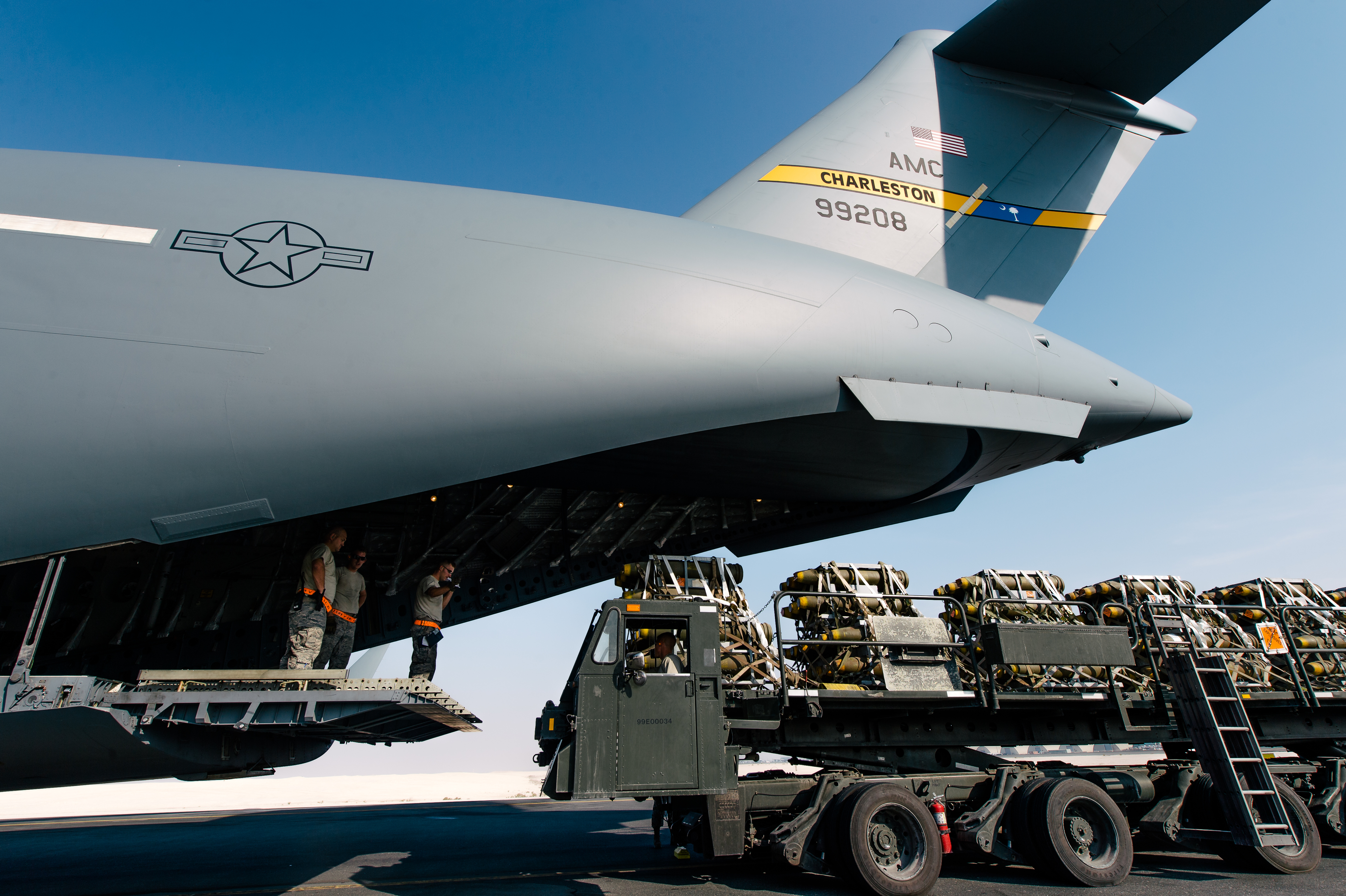
Airmen assigned to the 8th Expeditionary Air Mobility Squadron prepare to load a cargo onto an C-17 on 27 October as part of the U.S.-led airstrikes supporting the Mosul offensive, Al Udeid Air Base, Qatar

On 2 October, two Kurdish soldiers were killed and two French special forces operators were wounded by an IS drone north of Mosul, the drone was intercepted in flight and whilst they were examining the drone a small explosive device disguised as a battery blew up.

Coalition forces are playing a key role in the Battle of Mosul, on 17 October, The Guardian reported that US, British and French special forces, which have been advising the Peshmerga, will play a prominent role in calling in airstrikes against ISIL targets inside the city. Adding that, according to the Pentagon, the U.S. deployed an additional 600 troops to aid in the city's capture, bringing the total number of U.S. personnel in Iraq to more than 5,200. On 19 October, Stars and Stripes reported that U.S. Apache helicopters joined the battle, launching night attacks against IS militants. On 20 October, Chief Petty Officer Jason C. Finan, of the U.S. Navy's Explosive Ordnance Disposal Mobile Unit 3 who was attached to a SEAL team that was advising the Iraqi Counterterrorism Service, was killed in an improvised explosive device attack. The Washington Post reported that Lieutenant General Stephen Townsend said the Iraqi troops were attacked by Islamic State fighters and the SEAL team members decided to pull back along with the troops they were advising. Finan was in a vehicle and was telling other members of his team that he had spotted a roadside bomb when he was killed. Fox News reported that there are upwards of 300 special operations forces embedded with Iraqi and Kurdish troops in the fight to take back Mosul. It was reported that about 100 U.S. advisers - mostly Special Forces and forward air controllers, are moving with Iraqi forces, backed by U.S. airstrikes and rocket artillery fire, in the ground offensive to drive the IS from Mosul.

===== November 2016 =====
CJTF–OIR airstrike near Tal Afar on 5 November 2016

On 1 November, Stars and Stripes reported that U.S. special operators were at the front line on the edge of Mosul – just outside the village of Gogjali, with elite Iraqi troops from the U.S.-trained Golden Division who were preparing to enter Mosul. The Americans wore black uniforms and drove black armoured vehicles to blend in with their Iraqi counterparts, U.S. special operators near Gogjali set up a mortar, unloaded a bazooka-style weapon and watched nearby fighting from a farmhouse roof; At around midday a drone the Americans had launched earlier stalled and crashed beside the farmhouse, breaking its wings and propeller. An Iraqi general told The Associated Press that later that day, Iraq's special forces entered the outskirts of Mosul, taking the state television building and advancing to the borders of Karama district despite fierce resistance by IS fighters. The Associated Press reported that as the sun went down, a sandstorm blew in, reducing visibility to only 100 yards and bringing the day's combat to an end, the AP reported. Meanwhile, U.S. Army engineers from the 101st Airborne Division also pushed closer to Mosul, searching for improvised bombs just west of the Great Zab River.

===== December 2016 =====
On 4 December, a coalition airstrike in Mosul killed Falah al-Rashidi, an ISIL leader who was involved in ISIL's use of vehicle bombs in Mosul, a spokesman for CJTF–OIR, Colonel John Dorrian said "His removal further degrades ISIL's [vehicle bomb] threat, which has been the enemy's weapon of choice for attacking Iraqi security forces and civilians." Also that day Abu Turq was killed in Sharqat, Dorrian said "he was killed in an airstrike while fighting from a rooftop position in Sharqat, where he and several other fighters were moving a heavy weapon to fire upon partner forces. His removal increases pressure on the ISIL financial network, which is already severely disrupted by several hundred strikes on oil infrastructure and bulk cache sites."

On 21 December, an airstrike in Qaim killed Ahmad Abdullah Hamad al-Mahalawi, al-Mahalawi was ISIL senior in Qaim, Colonel John Dorrian a spokesman for CJTF–OIR said "His removal will disrupt ISIL's ability to conduct operations along the Euphrates River Valley."

==== 2017 ====
===== January 2017 =====
On 27 January Sky News reported that French special forces in Mosul discovered a warehouse and unloading area near the Tigris River where dozens of missiles were stored alongside makeshift launchers with Russian markings. The weapons are thought to have come from Syria, most were designed to be fired by jets but one was a 10 ft-long missile- beneath the cover of trees IS fighters had been working on building a Scud missile. Near the preparation site, three large refrigerated cargo carriers had been opened and were full of coking coal but buried inside, Iraqi soldiers found containers with an unidentified substance inside, the area smelt strongly of chemicals, French soldiers advised the Iraqi team that the whole area was contaminated; tests are now being carried out on what senior commanders called "poison". Iraqi special forces say IS were planning to launch long and short-range missiles tipped with chemical or biological war heads from western Mosul; Brigadier Ali of the Counter Terrorism Service, in charge of the weapons discovery, said he believed the production of the chemical weapons had been halted by the start of the offensive on Mosul and the targeting of IS fighters by coalition planes and drones. Later, The Guardian reported that Brigadier General Haider Fadhil from Iraqi special forces said French officials tested the chemical and confirmed it was a mustard agent.

===== February 2017 =====
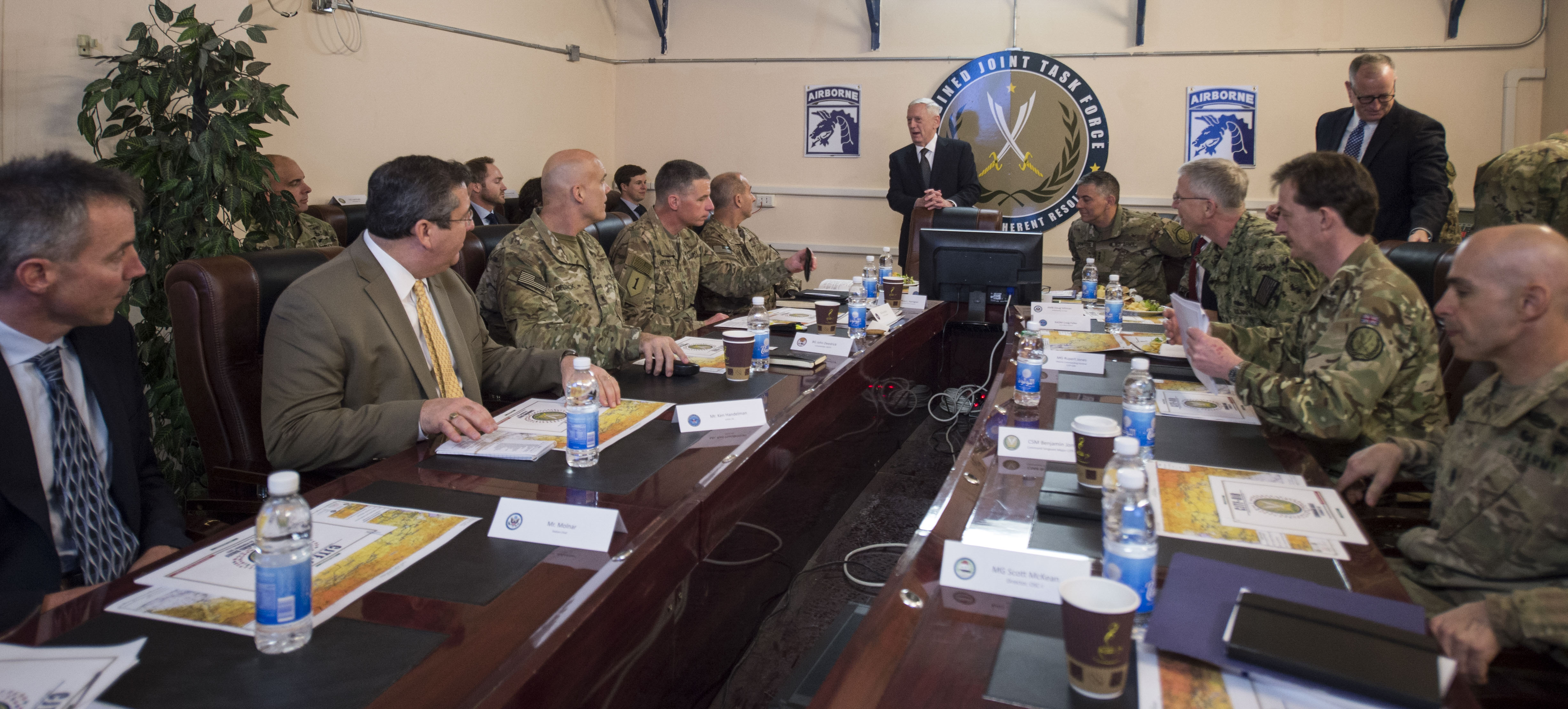
United States Secretary of Defense James Mattis during his visit to Iraq, 20 February 2017

On 11 February, the Telegraph reported that Iraqi aircraft carried out an airstrike on a house in Anbar where ISIL leader Abu Bakr al-Baghdadi was holding a meeting with senior ISIL commanders, killing more than a dozen.

===== March 2017 =====
On 17 March, a U.S.-led coalition airstrike in Mosul killed more than 200 civilians.

On 27 March, it was reported that 300 paratroopers from the 82nd Airborne's 2d Brigade Combat Team will temporarily deploy to northern Iraq to provide additional advise-and-assist combating ISIL, particularly to speed up the offensive against ISIL in Mosul. On 29 March, Stars and Stripes reported that 400 soldiers from the 1st Armoured division's headquarters element will deploy to Iraq in summer 2017, where it will lead the coalition's ground efforts. A study published in the journal PLOS Medicine showed that U.S. Coalition forces killed more civilians than the Islamic State during the nine-month battle to liberate the Iraqi city of Mosul than during the three-year occupation by the Islamic State

===== April 2017 =====
On 1 April, Military.com reported that Iraqi fighter jets carried out airstrikes on IS militants-who had crossed over the border from Syria-in the town of Baaj near the Syrian border, killing between 150 and 200 militants. Reuters reported that Iraqi State TV said that, citing Iraq's military intelligence, an air strike in the region of al-Qaim killed Ayad al-Jumaili, who was believed to be the "second-in-command" of ISIL.

On 29 April, Army Times reported that First Lieutenant Weston Lee of 1st Battalion, 325th Infantry Regiment, 2nd Brigade Combat Team, 82nd Airborne Division died from wounds received from the detonation of an IED during a patrol outside Mosul.

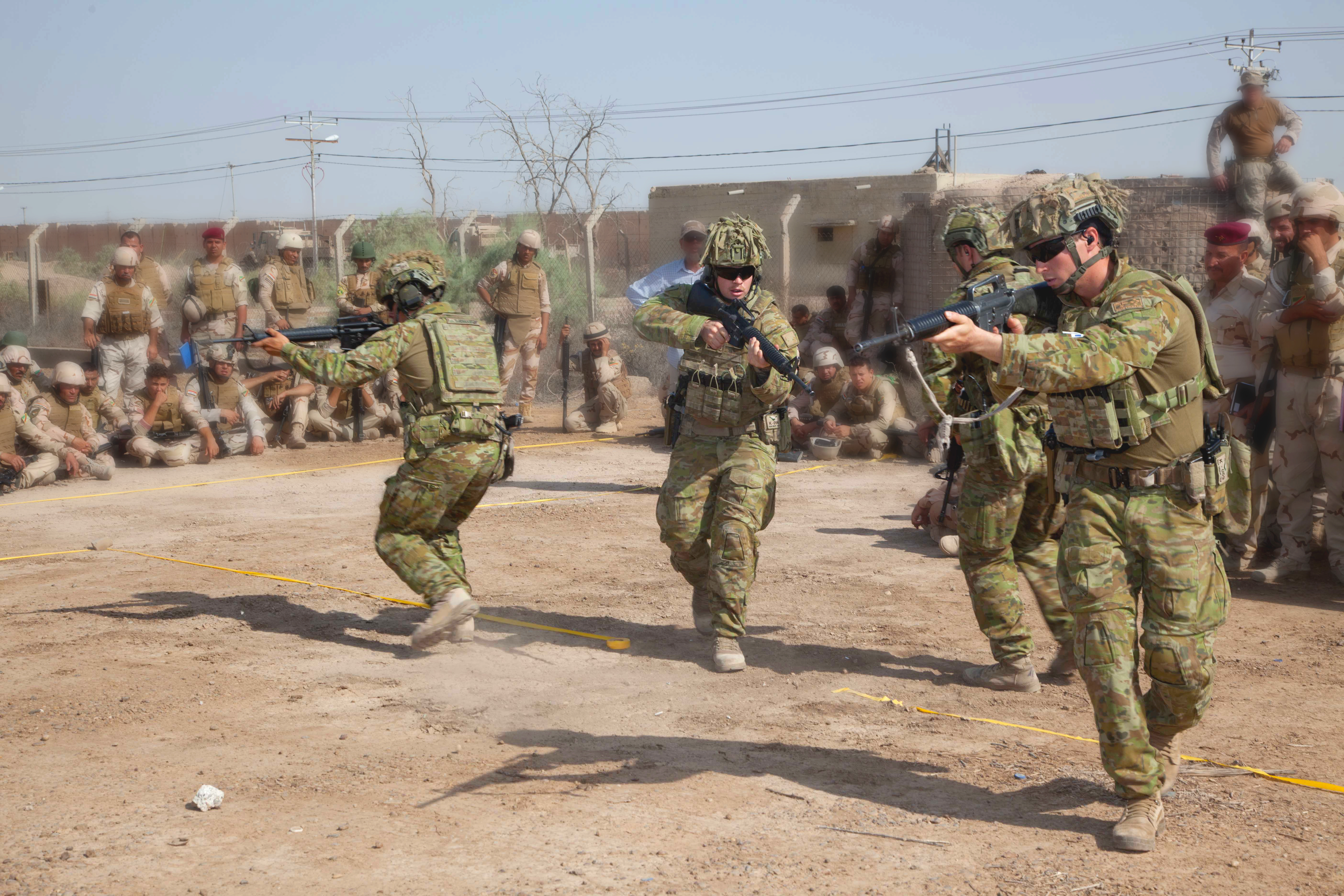
Australian Army trainers demonstrate close-quarters combat techniques to Iraqi soldiers at Camp Taji, July 2017

===== August 2017 =====
On 13 August, Stars and Stripes reported that 2 U.S. Soldiers of 2nd Battalion, 319th Airborne Field Artillery Regiment, 2nd Brigade Combat Team, 82nd Airborne Division, based at an undisclosed firebase in Iraq (where U.S. troops are supporting Iraqi forces in their ongoing offensive against ISIL militants after they ousted them from Mosul) were killed when an artillery round prematurely exploded, five others were also wounded in the blast.

===== October 2017 =====
On 1 October, Specialist Alexander W. Missildine of the 710th Brigade Support Battalion, 3rd Brigade Combat Team, 10th Mountain Division, was killed by an EFP (a type of improvised explosive that was first used by insurgents supplied by Iran with the help of Hezbollah for use against armored vehicles during the Iraq War) whilst traveling on a major road in Saladin Governorate or Nineveh Governorate, another soldier was wounded. The Washington Post reported that the device had not been used in Iraq for six years and that ISIL did not make any public claim of responsibility after the attack, but that it did coincide with threats from some of the Iranian-backed Shia militias who fought with the U.S. against the ISIL but now want U.S. forces to leave the country now that ISIL is almost defeated. According to Greg Robin, an expert in explosive devices for the Sahan Research Group, the bomb has been used in Afghanistan, by al-Shabaab in Somalia and Palestinian Islamic Jihad group.

===== December 2017 =====
On 9 December 2017, it is reported that ISIL had lost all strategic territory in Iraq.

On 22 December, Australian Defense Minister Marise Payne said that Australia will end air strikes against ISIL and bring its six Super Hornet planes back home. She also added that other Australian operations in the region would continue, with 80 personnel who are part of the Special Operations Task Group in Iraq, including Australian special forces, continuing their deployment. Australian soldiers have also been training Iraqi troops at the Taji military base outside Baghdad.

==== 2018 ====
===== February 2018 =====
The U.S. announced that it would begin to reduce its troop levels in Iraq.

===== July 2018 =====
As of 2 July 2018, the U.S. still maintains a military presence of 5,000 troops stationed in Iraq with the task of helping train and assist Iraqi forces.

===== October 2018 =====
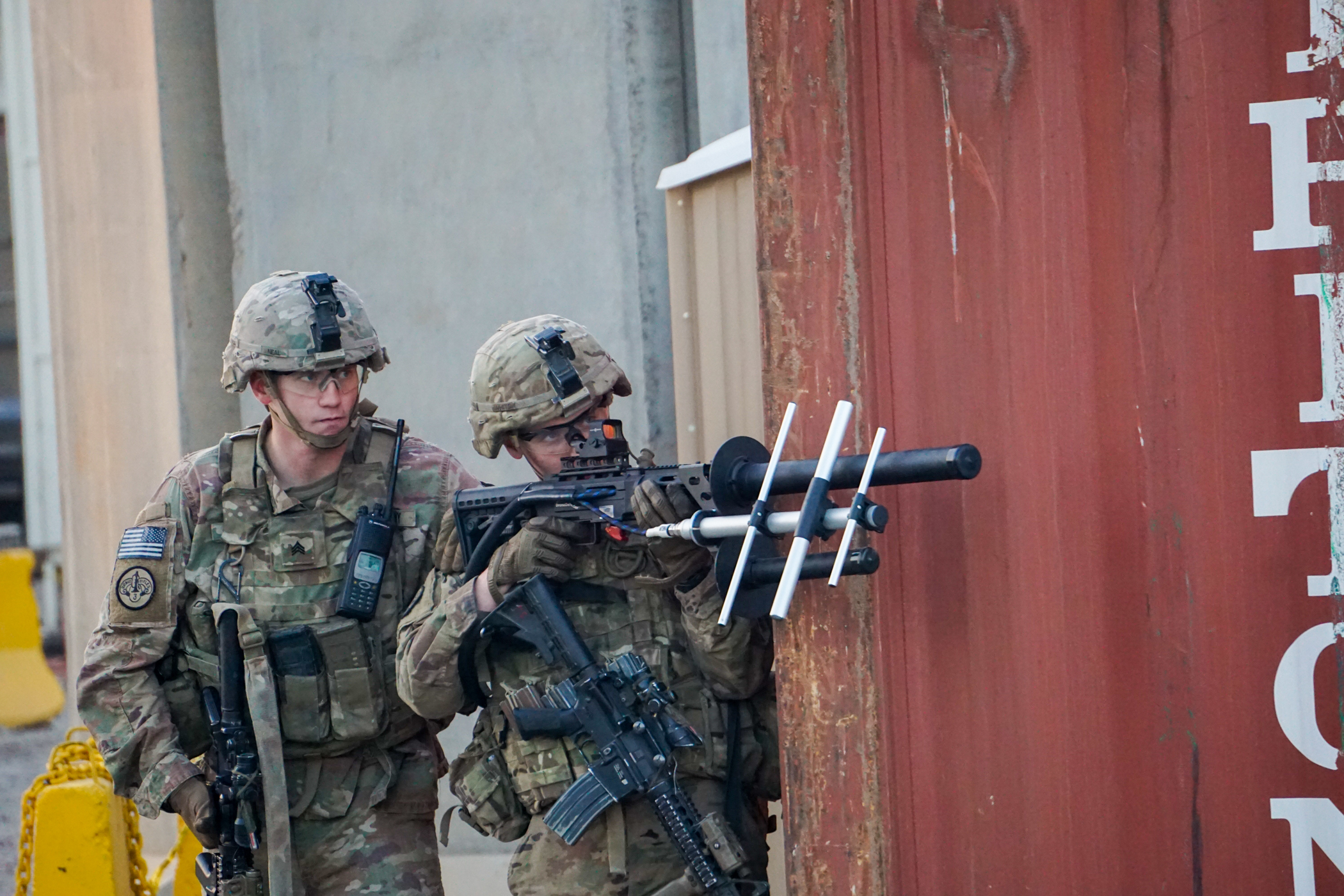
1st Squadron, 3rd Cavalry Regiment of the U.S. Army drill with the Battelle DroneDefender in Iraq, 30 October 2018. U.S. troops anticipate ISIL units deploying drones during reconnaissance or attacks

On 4 October 2018, an operation against ISIL was started by the Iraqi military along with the military forces of France and the United States under the CJTF-OIR coalition in Al Anbar Governorate around the city of Qaim and the Syrian border where ISIL continues to operate and maintain a strong and large presence. During the operation ISIL claimed to thwart an American-led assault near the Syrian border and also claimed to have killed 3 U.S. soldiers and wounded 4 others in the clashes, the U.S. military has not confirmed or denied the claimed losses.

On 5 October 2018, US-led Coalition planes bombed an ISIL position in the village of Kushaf near the Tigris river in the Kirkuk Governorate, reportedly killing 6 ISIL members, on the same day ISIL detonated a roadside bomb killing an oil employee and injuring 11 others in a bus in Baiji in the Saladin Governorate, and in a separate attack in Fallujah in the Anbar Governorate ISIL detonated a car bomb injuring an Iraqi policeman and 3 others.

===== December 2018 =====
On 15 December 2018, A U.S. airstrike from a B-1 Lancer bomber targeted a cave entrance West of Mosul in the Atshana Mountains killing four ISIL fighters.

==== 2019 ====
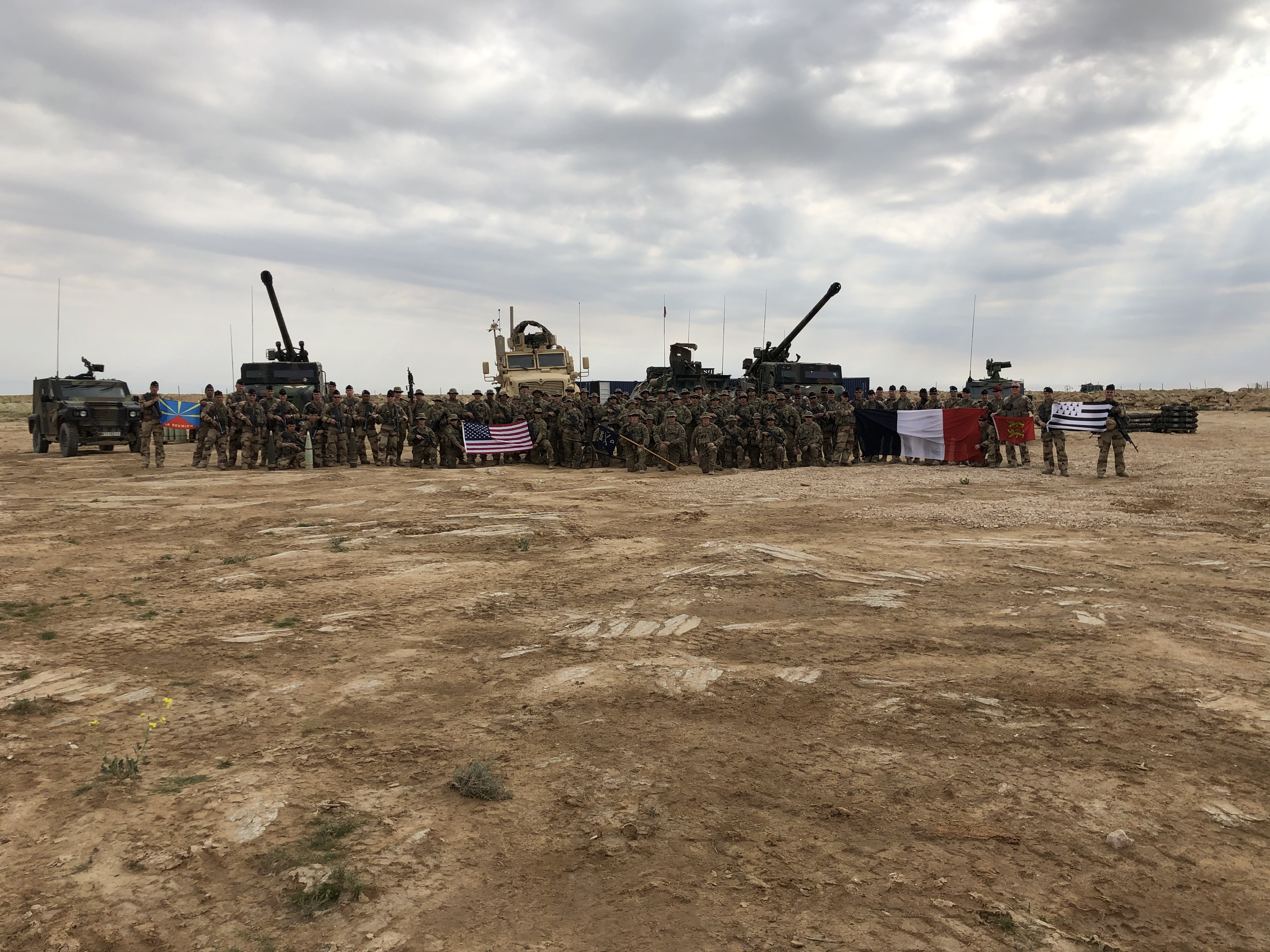
French and American soldiers in support of the CJTF-OIR in Iraq, 2019. Coalition forces supported SDF advances with airstrikes and cross-border artillery from Iraq

On 31 December, angry protestors attacked the United States embassy in Baghdad, in response to the U.S. airstrike two days earlier against Kata'ib Hezbollah militia. Reuters reported that, in response, U.S. ambassador and staff have been evacuated, though this was denied by the U.S. Army. U.S. President Donald Trump blamed Iran for the attack.

==== 2020 ====
===== January 2020 =====
====== Baghdad International Airport drone strike ======
On 3 January 2020, United States forces carried out a missile strike that hit a convoy near Baghdad International Airport, killing Iranian Major general Qasem Soleimani and Popular Mobilization Forces leader Abu Mahdi al-Muhandis. PMU spokesman Ahmed Al Asadi confirmed the death of Quds Force Commander Qasem Soleimani in an airstrike, blaming Israel and the United States. United States officials said "strikes [had] been carried out against two targets linked to Iran in Baghdad."

In response to the airstrike, the Iraqi Parliament voted on 5 January 2020, to force foreign troops to withdraw from Iraq. U.S. President Donald J. Trump announced his objection to the withdrawal vote, and threatened to slap sanctions on Iraq if it were approved by the Iraqi government. On 7 January, Iraqi Prime Minister Abdul Mahdi held a Cabinet meeting, where he declared his support for a removal of foreign troops and stated that it was the only way to de-escalate growing tension This drew further objection from the U.S. government. The same day, however, both the U.K and Germany began reducing the size of their military presence in Iraq

In addition to withdrawing some troops, U.K. Defence Minister Ben Wallace pledged a full withdrawal if asked to do so by the Iraqi government. Germany also "temporarily thinned out" its bases in Baghdad and Camp Taji. Canada later joined in with the coalition withdrawal as well by transferring some of its troops stationed in Iraq to Kuwait. About 400 British, 200 French, and 120 German forces, as well as dozens of other international troops, were stationed in Iraq to assist the approximately 5,200 U.S. soldiers stationed in the country. Like the U.S., the French and Australian governments have also shown resistance to withdrawing troops from Iraq. France Defense Minister Florence Parly even stated that security had re-enforced for French troops stationed in and that they would continue to fight ISIS. Parly also warned Iran not to further escalate tensions.

====== Iranian ballistic missile attack ======
On 8 January 2020, Iran's Islamic Revolutionary Guard Corps (IRGC) launched numerous ballistic missiles at the Ayn al-Asad airbase in Al Anbar Governorate, Western Iraq, where U.S.-led coalition forces are stationed as well as another airbase in Erbil, Iraqi Kurdistan, in response to the killing of Major General Qasem Soleimani by a United States drone strike.

On 23 January, in regards to ISIL activity in Iraq and northeastern Syria, ambassador James Jeffrey stated there was no uptick in violence following the U.S. drone strike in Baghdad on 3 January that killed Soleimani. Jeffrey said U.S.-led coalition operations have been on pause in Iraq as the focus has been on force protection and talks with the Baghdad government on the way forward after Iraq's parliament voted to expel foreign troops. He acknowledged that a pause in Iraq could hamper the fight against Islamic State if it continues.

On 24 January, hundreds of thousands marched in Baghdad to protest the American troops' presence in Iraq. On 26 January, at least five Katyusha rockets attacked the U.S. embassy in Iraq's capital, Baghdad, wounding one person.

===== February 2020 =====
====== Demand of U.S. troop withdrawal from military bases in Iraq ======
On 10 February, Iraqi parliament member Ali al-Ghanimi reported that the United States began to withdraw its troops from 15 military bases in Iraq. The U.S. continued its presence in the Ain al-Asad airbase in the Anbar province and also at the one near the city of Erbil. Following this, the Iraqi parliament pressed for American troops to "be withdrawn from all the bases". In the meantime, U.S. President Donald Trump mentioned that Iraq should pay back the U.S. for the facilities built there, if the U.S. military leaves, from Iraqi money held in the U.S. Otherwise the troops would stay in Iraq. Moreover, the Trump administration drafted sanctions against Iraq whether they expel U.S. troops. Later on, U.S. military offered to partially withdraw from bases near Shia-majority areas such as Balad Air Base, but Ain al-Asad was a "red line".

===== March 2020 =====
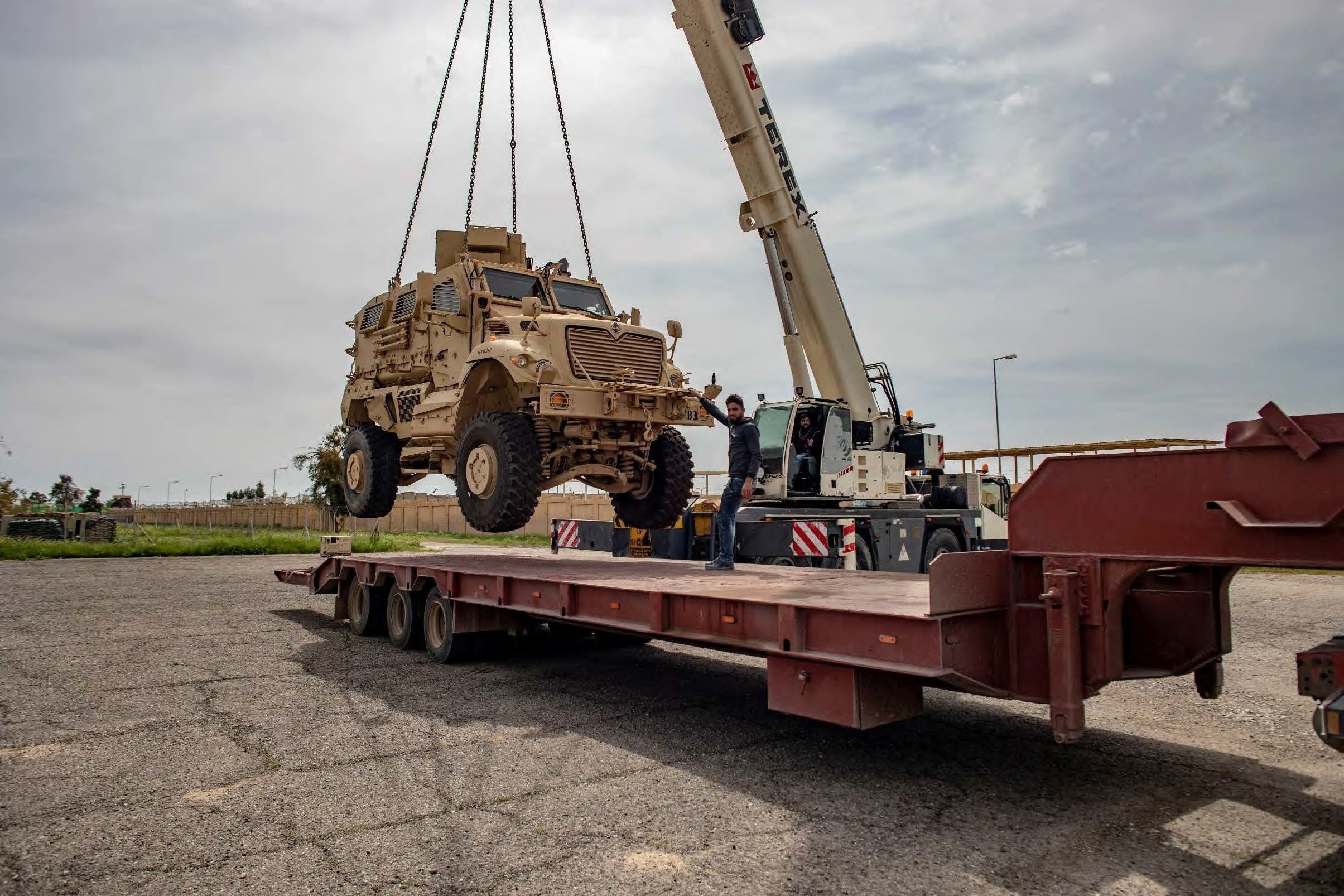
Contractors load an MRAP onto a flatbed as the CJTF-OIR coalition transfers the K-1 Air Base to Iraqi security forces, 21 March 2020

On 9 March, the Pentagon released a statement claiming that two American Marines were killed during an anti-ISIS operation in a mountainous area of north central Iraq. Col. Myles B. Caggins III, a spokesman for the OIR coalition, later identified the Marines, who were also MARSOC Raiders, and that they died during an operation which also claimed the lives of four ISIS fighters during an American-led operation which involved clearing an ISIS cave complex in the Makhmur Mountains, south of Erbil.

On 11 March, two Americans and one British soldier from the Royal Army Medical Corps, were killed after targeting the Camp Taji with 15 Katyusha rockets. The attack also left 12 other persons wounded of which 5 were critically injured. On 13 March after midnight, U.S. launched air raids against Kata'ib Hezbollah facilities in Karbala and Babylon.

===== April 2020 =====
On 7 April, the International Coalition withdrew from the Abu Ghraib operating base, the al-Sqoor base inside Nineveh operation command and the Al-Taqaddum Air Base, handing the control to the Iraqi security forces.

===== June–July 2020 =====
In June 2020, coalition aircraft destroyed three ISIL camps in northern Iraq.

In early July 2020, a Katyusha rocket launched from the Ali al-Saleh area of Baghdad towards the Green Zone injured a child and damaged a house after it landed south of its target.

==== 2021 ====
===== January 2021 =====
On 27 January 2021, during a joint operation led by the Iraqi Counter Terrorism Service (CTS), the coalition killed ISIL's leader in Iraq, Abu Yasser al-Issawi, in an air strike on an underground hideout in Kirkuk. Al-Issawi was ISIL's "wali" (governor) of its Iraqi operations and allegedly the group's overall second-in-command according to Iraqi authorities, though that ranking could not be independently verified. The operation, which also included raids on guesthouses, killed nine other ISIL members and was in retaliation for the Baghdad bombings that killed 32 Iraqis a week prior, officials added.

===== December 2021 =====
The U.S. formally concluded its combat mission in Iraq on 9 December 2021, leaving the 2,500 troops remaining in the country to serve as trainers and advisors to the Iraqi security forces.

== Humanitarian efforts ==
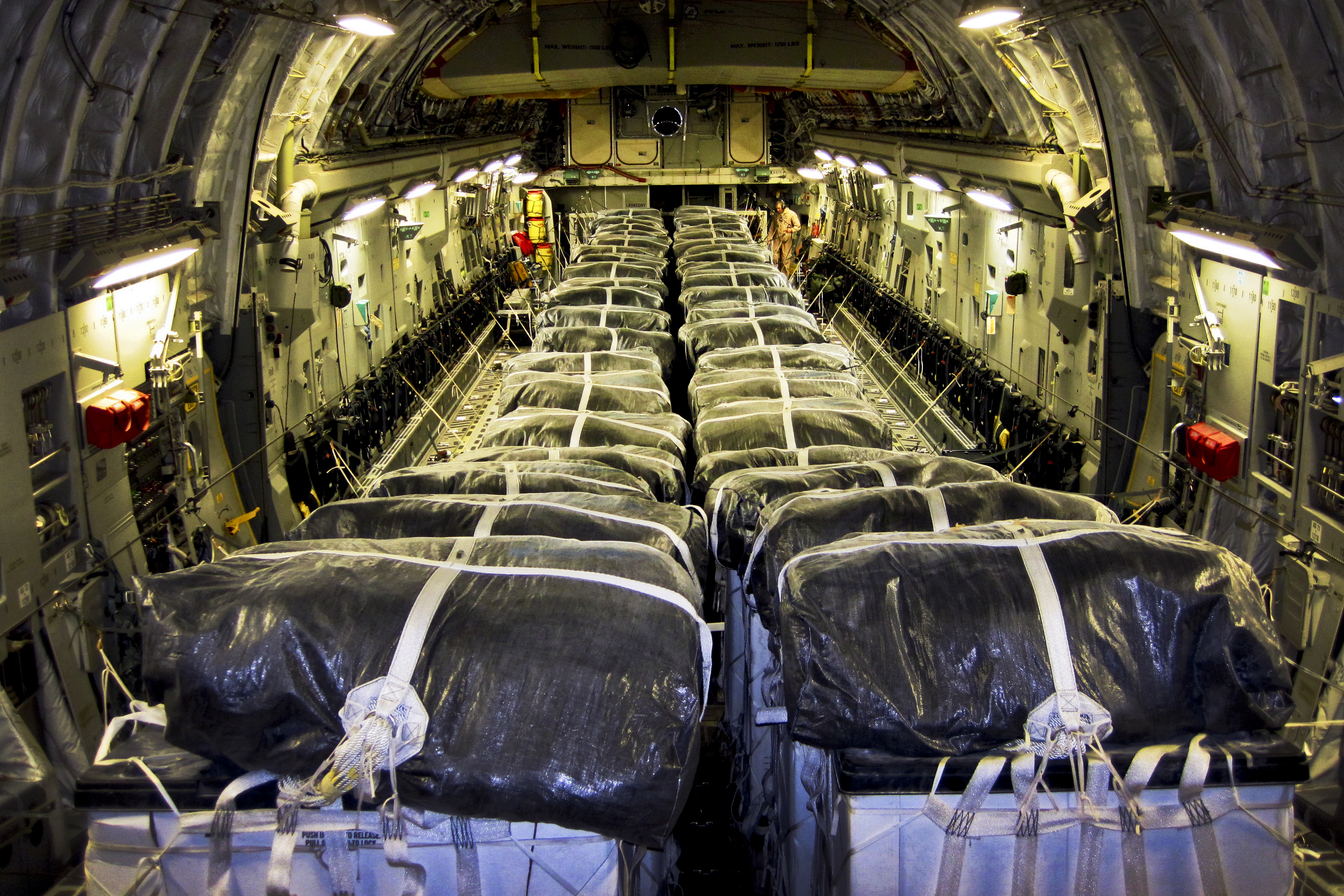
Water is loaded on a U.S. C-17 for an airdrop on 8 August 2014

The United States and international partners have undertaken a large humanitarian effort to support refugees stranded in northern Iraq with airdropped supplies.

On 7 August, two Lockheed C-130 Hercules's and one Boeing C-17 Globemaster III dropped tens of thousands of meals and thousands of gallons of drinking water to Yazidi refugees who were stranded in the Sinjar Mountains by advancing ISIL forces. On 9 August 2014, U.S. aircraft again dropped humanitarian supplies over northern Iraq, this time consisting of 4,000 gallons of drinking water and 16,000 ready-to-eat meals. The United Kingdom made humanitarian supply airdrops to Yazidi refugees on Mount Sinjar starting on 10 August 2014, using Royal Air Force C-130's operating from RAF Akrotiri in Cyprus, while surveillance was provided by Panavia Tornado GR4s. It has been announced that Boeing Chinooks will also be deployed. New Zealand's foreign minister Murray McCully announced that New Zealand would provide $500,000 to the Office of the UN High Commissioner for Refugees (UNHCR) to help people displaced by fighting in Iraq.

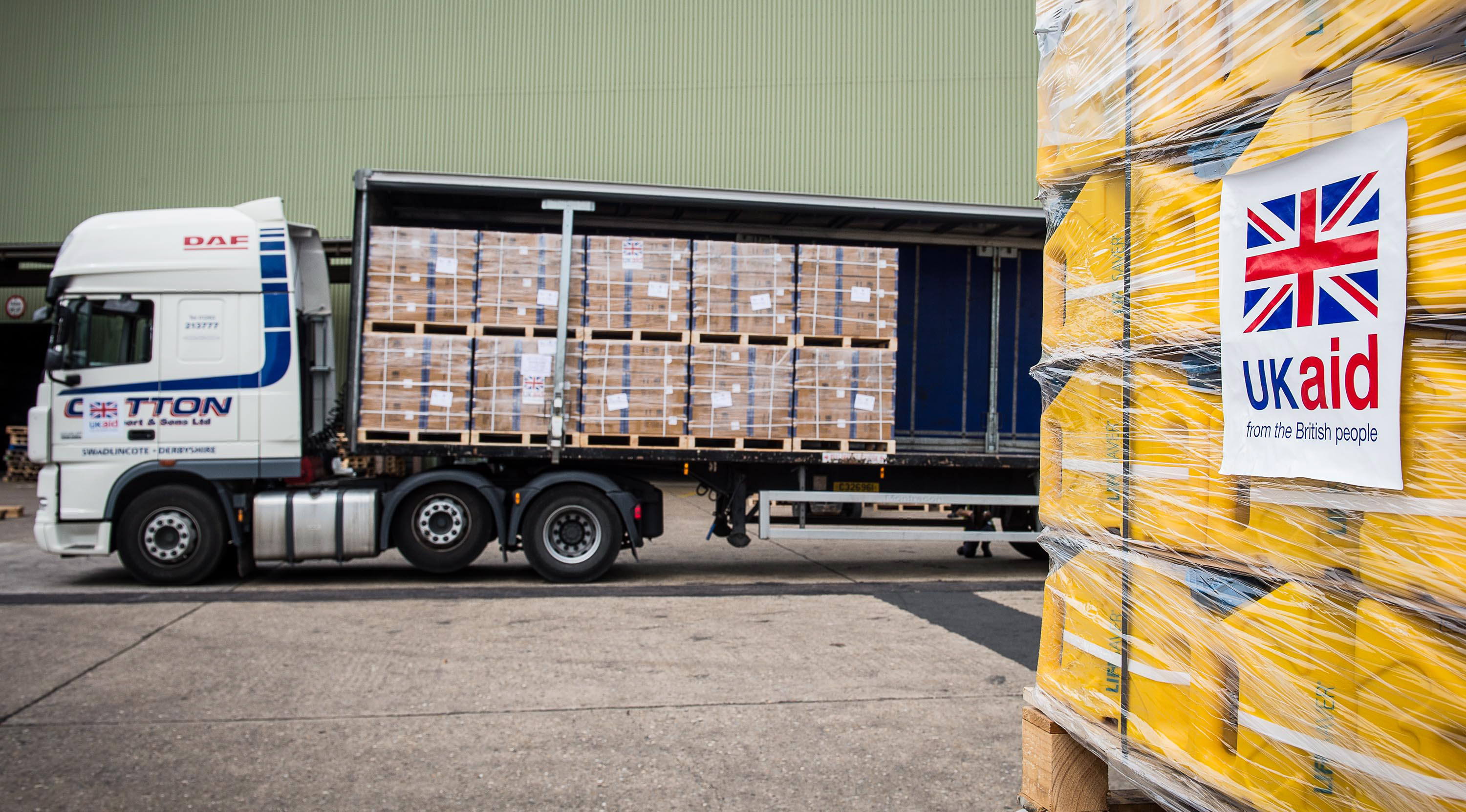
British aid for Iraq is loaded at RAF Brize Norton

On the night of 13–14 August, a 16-aircraft mission including U.S. C-17s and C-130Hs, a British C-130J, and an Australian C-130J airdropped supplies to Yezidi civilians trapped on Mount Sinjar in what was later described as "the first mass air delivery of humanitarian cargo since the outbreak of violence in East Timor in 1999."

C-130J transport aircraft from the Royal Australian Air Force based in the Middle East on 13/14 August 2014, started airdropping humanitarian aid in Northern Iraq. Denmark committed a C-130 transport aircraft and money for relief efforts. France planned to contribute to ongoing humanitarian efforts in Iraq, in addition to offering asylum to Iraqi Christians fleeing the violence. Germany ramped up humanitarian spending in Northern Iraq and sent 4 transport aircraft. Greece sent humanitarian aid to the Kurds of northern Iraq. and Italy also launched humanitarian support. Sweden expressed support for military assistance by others but for legal reasons only provided humanitarian support.

The European Commission of the European Union announced it would boost humanitarian aid to Iraq to €17m, and approved special emergency measures to meet the crisis. On 15 August 2014, 20 of the 28 EU foreign ministers met in Brussels to discuss military and humanitarian assistance.

== Casualties ==
=== Civilians ===
According to Iraq Body Count, 118 civilians were killed by coalition airstrikes in 2014 and 845 in 2015.

According to "Airwars", a team of independent journalists, between 1,687 and 2,534 civilians were killed by coalition airstrikes in 288 incidents in Iraq and Syria between 8 August 2014 and 18 October 2016; other incidents with thousands more civilian fatalities were also recorded by Airwars, but the US-led coalition's responsibility could not be confirmed with equal confidence in those cases.

In February 2017, the Trump administration stated that the U.S. would sharply escalate its support for the offensive in Mosul. The Pentagon reported that around 1,400 separate munitions were used in the last two weeks of March. The Iraqi Observatory for Human Rights reported, at the end of March 2017, an increase in the rate of airstrikes and reported 3,846 civilian deaths and the destruction of 10,000 homes since the offensive into Western Mosul began in February 2017. Bassma Bassim, the head of the Mosul District Council, stated that air raids from 10 March to 17 March alone had killed "more than 500" civilians. including 278 civilians who were killed in an airstrike on 17 March.

=== ISIL fighters ===
On 9 August, U.S. airstrikes killed 16 ISIL fighters, Iraqi officials reported. Between 9–11 August, in a concerted U.S.-Iraqi operation, an Iraqi airstrike killed 45 ISIL men. On 8 September, in an operation of Iraqi forces with U.S. airstrikes, Iraq reported that 15 ISIL fighters were killed. On 23 February 2015, it was revealed that over 8,500 ISIL fighters had been killed by US-led airstrikes, with at least 7,000 of the deaths in Iraq.

By early June 2015, ISIL had lost over 13,000 fighters to Coalition airstrikes in Iraq and Syria, with 10,800+ of the deaths in Iraq. By July 2015, ISIL had lost over 15,000 fighters to US-led Coalition airstrikes in Iraq and Syria, with 12,100+ fighters killed in Iraq.

=== Peshmerga troops ===
"At least 999 Peshmerga troops lost their lives and 4,596 have been injured between June 10, 2014 and February 3, 2015," said Jabbar Yawar, secretary-general of the Ministry of Peshmerga Affairs to reporters at a press conference in Arbil on 4 February 2015.

In late February 2015, it was revealed that the Peshmerga losses had increased to over 1,000 dead, and over 5,000 wounded.

=== U.S. soldiers ===
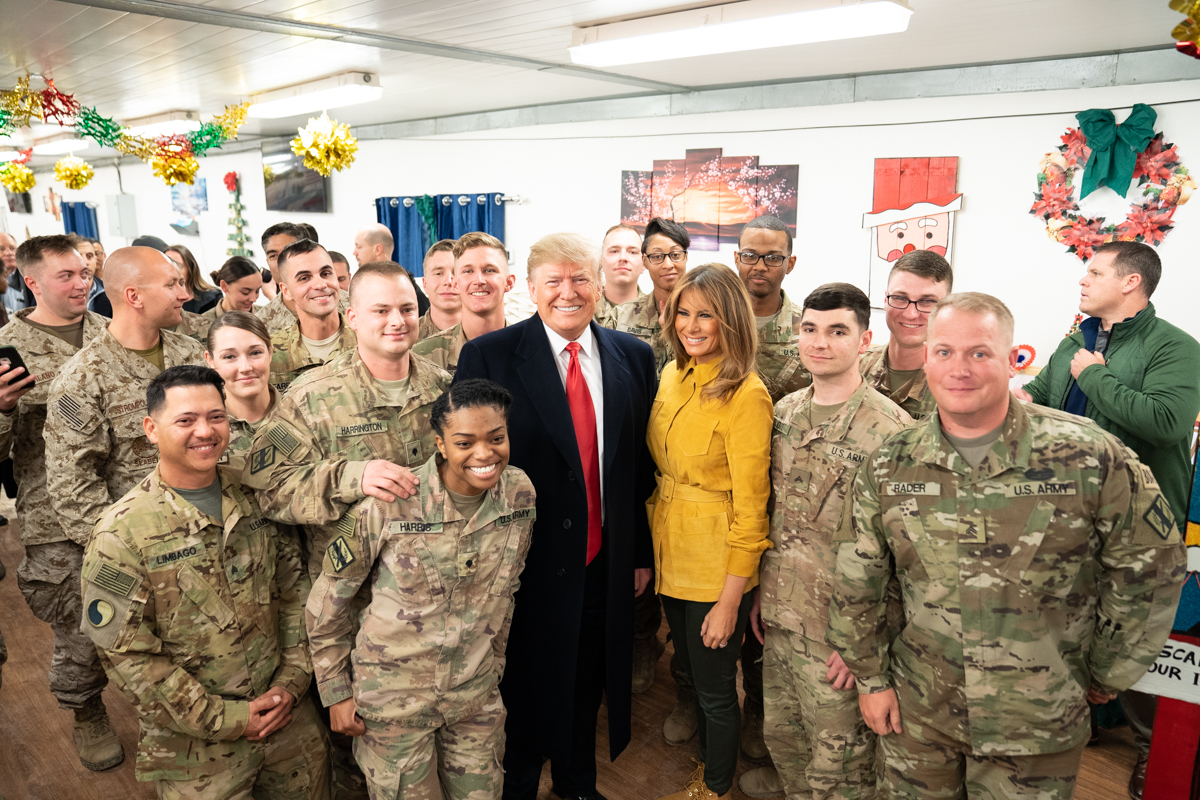
President Donald Trump visits U.S. troops at the Al Asad Airbase in Iraq, 26 December 2018

The United States suffered its first casualty of the conflict on 2 October 2014, when a United States Marine Corps MV-22 Osprey crashed in the Persian Gulf after takeoff from USS Makin Island, leaving one of its crewmen missing and presumed dead.

== Reactions ==
The initial decision to intervene in Iraq was met with bipartisan support in the United States Congress, albeit subject to a range of interpretations as to what constitutes legitimate intervention. Barbara Lee supported a strictly humanitarian intervention and opposed any mission creep as did Richard Blumenthal who argued for humanitarian relief, but opposed a prolonged direct military involvement. Bob Corker expected greater clarity with regards to the intervention's objectives, time frame and source of authorization. while Dick Durbin opined that he, "still had concerns" despite assurances from Obama that no U.S. ground troops would be deployed in Iraq. Congressional Democrats and Republicans who were more hawkish for their support for the intervention included the Senate Armed Services Committee Chairman Carl Levin, Senate Majority Leader Harry Reid, chairwoman of the Senate Intelligence Committee Dianne Feinstein and then-Speaker of the United States House of Representatives John Boehner.

Despite the bipartisan support, the President's decision to re-engage the United States into a conflict in Iraq has attracted criticism from both the political left and right. Andrew Bacevich argued against military action, but not humanitarian assistance as did Seumas Milne who argued against military, but not humanitarian intervention. On the contrary, Cal Thomas accused Obama's decision to withhold U.S. military assistance barring efforts by the Iraqi government to bridge the country's sectarian differences as tantamount to abandonment while an article in the Globe and Mail cautioned that an American intervention "would kill both ISIL and MCIR fighters as well as many Sunni civilians and fail to fix the underlying issues." An article by the Associated Press wrote that critics of Obama drew a direct connection between his foreign policy approach that underestimated ISIL and his decision to withdraw all U.S. troops from Iraq in late 2011.

Mirroring the bipartisan congressional support for the interventions, polls, notwithstanding varying qualifications, show majorities of Americans supporting air strike in Iraq.

The editorial boards of The Washington Post, The New York Times, The Guardian, and The Wall Street Journal penned editorials that were supportive of the intervention. Two editorials by The Washington Post argued that Iraqi's disintegration would threaten national, regional and global security and described efforts by the Obama administration to create a more inclusive Iraq government as presenting the best hope for the country in its fight against ISIS. Two editorials written in August by The New York Times also supported the intervention, praising Obama's sagacity in delivering the necessary humanitarian assistance to the Christians, Yazidis and other minorities on Mount Sinjar while eschewing the redeployment of American ground troops, and describing the subsequent deployment of American military airstrikes and other forms of assistance as, although insufficient, a necessary component of a more comprehensive strategy to defeating ISIS. An editorial by The Guardian written in June opined that ISIL's June 2014 Iraqi offensive invited foreign intervention that included the United States and that Obama's conditionalization of aid on Iraqis working together was in the best interest of all of Iraq's regions. Similarly, an editorial in The Wall Street Journal written in August wrote of the strategic interest the United States had in defeating ISIL and positively assessed the efficacy of American airstrikes in "reducing the jihadists' room for maneuver and giving new confidence to the Kurdish forces." While condemning ISIL's savagery and acknowledging the threat to American national interests in the Middle East that the group posed, an editorial by the editorial board of the Los Angeles Times argued that congressional authorization should override Obama's legal authority as the ultimate legal basis for the usage of military force in Iraq.

Support for the intervention in the media was not unanimous. An editorial in The Washington Post criticized the American strategy of creating a unity government in order to fight ISIL was a mirage due to the country's political-religious cleavages and ISIL's numerical and technological superiority. William D. Hartung, writing in Stars and Stripes argued that the intervention would result in mission creep.

In an article for the BBC, Marc Weller, professor of international law at Cambridge University, argued that the U.S. airstrikes are consistent with international law. Specifically, he argued that: the government in Baghdad invited international forces to join in the fight against ISIL; the newly reconstituted and religiously representative Iraqi government has a positive obligation to deliver on its constitutional promises and defend its population from subjugation by ISIS; and foreign intervention exercising the right of collective self-defense on behalf of Iraq can involve forcible action in IS-controlled territories in Syria that is proportional to the necessity of securing Iraq's borders. Similarly, Michael Ignatieff, professor of politics at Harvard University discussed the international dimensions of American intervention in Iraq in an interview with Der Spiegel in which he described the Islamic State as an "attack on all values of civilization" and that it was essential that America, "continued with their air strikes".

Ramzi Mardini in The New York Times wrote an op-ed opposing armed intervention as it exacerbated the blowback risk of terrorism against U.S. although he did not object to humanitarian assistance aimed at helping the persecuted religious minorities living in ISIL controlled territories and instead called for greater diplomatic intervention in which the United States played a key role as an arbiter between Iraq's warring sectarian factions. On the other hand, Aaron Zelin of the Washington Institute for Near East Policy argues that ISIL are "likely planning attacks whether the U.S. conducts targeted air strikes or not" and that, in his opinion, the United States, "should destroy them as soon as possible". Former Secretary of State Hillary Clinton and members of the Republican party including John McCain, Lindsey Graham, Ted Cruz, and John Boehner have likewise called for greater military strikes in the region to contain the Islamic State.

In an interview with the Atlantic, Hillary Clinton suggested that the current crisis in Iraq was a result of his [President Obama] refusal to arm Syrian rebels, which Obama, in a meeting with lawmakers before Clinton's interview, criticized as "horseshit".

An editorial in Vox defined the intervention as being limited to Kurdistan, effectively allowing the Islamic State to control a large part of Iraq absent any other occupying power. The editorial argued that the stability of Kurdistan would make it a better ally for the US.

The Secretary of Iran's Supreme National Security Council Ali Shamkhani condemned the US-led coalition airstrikes in Mosul in March 2017 which killed more than 200 civilians and accused the United States of committing war crimes, saying: "This war crime is similar to the behavior of Daesh [Islamic State] and other Takfiri groups in targeting civilians and innocent people and should be urgently addressed in courts of justice."

== Aftermath ==
Although the Biden administration ended the U.S. combat mission against the Islamic State in December 2021 and shifted remaining forces towards a training and advisory role—a largely formal decision as U.S. troops had already been training and assisting Iraqi forces for years—the Pentagon said troops remained in a "hazardous environment" and retained the ability to defend themselves, citing regional threats. "...We continue to see threats against our forces in Iraq and Syria by militia groups that are backed by Iran," said Pentagon spokesman John Kirby.

== See also ==
- History of Iraq
- 2014 international conferences on Iraqi security
- Spillover of the Syrian civil war
- February 2015 Egyptian airstrikes in Libya
- Opération Chammal – included French operation against ISIL
- Operation Shader – included UK operation against ISIL
- Operation Okra – included Australian operation against ISIL
- Operation Impact – included Canadian operation against ISIL
- US intervention in the Syrian civil war
- War against the Islamic State
- Iranian intervention in Iraq (2014–present) – separate Iranian operation against ISIL
- Yazidi genocide
- Persecution of Christians by the Islamic State
- Iraqi insurgency (2011–2013)
- Foreign interventions by the United States
- Fall of Mosul
- Salahuddin campaign
- First Battle of Tikrit
- Siege of Amirli
- Battle of Baiji (2014–2015)
- Battle of Ramadi (2014–2015)
- Battle of Baiji (2014–2015)
- Sinjar offensive
- Second Battle of Tikrit
- Anbar campaign (2015–2016)
- List of wars and battles involving the Islamic State
- US intervention in the Syrian civil war, for the closely related operations in Syria
- Iraq War, for the war beginning in 2003 and ending in 2011
