= Abdul-Ghani al-Asadi =

Iraqi military special forces general

Abdul Ghani al-Asadi
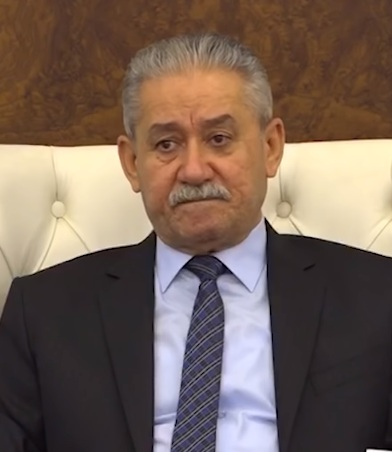
- Al-Asadi, 31 May 2021

Governor of Dhi Qar
- In office 26 February 2021 – 7 April 2021
- Appointed by: Mustafa Al-Kadhimi
- Preceded by: Nathem al-Waeli
- Succeeded by: Ahmed al-Khafaji

Personal details
- Born: 1951 (age 74–75) Amarah, Kingdom of Iraq

Military service
- Allegiance: Iraq
- Branch/service: Iraqi Ground Forces (1968–2003) ISOF (until 2018)
- Years of service: 1968–2018 (retired)
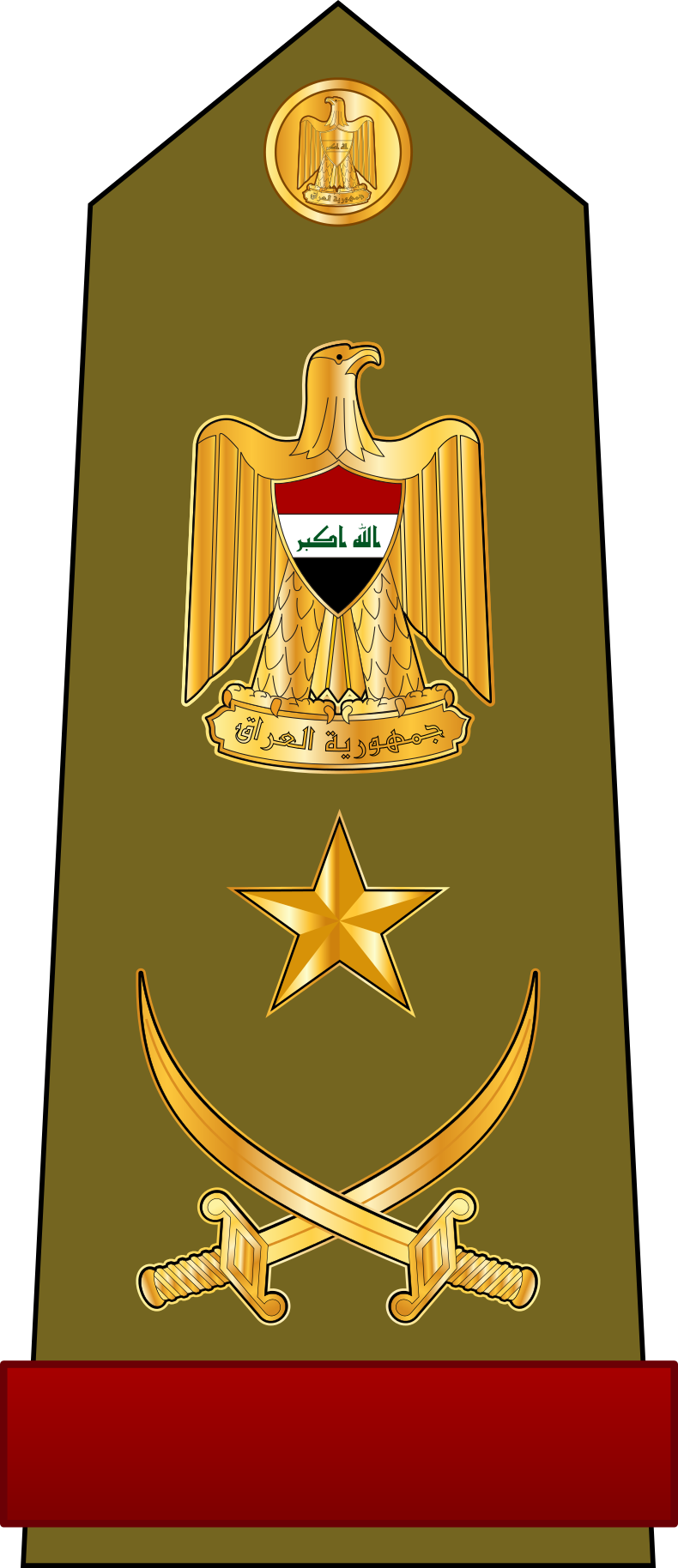
- Rank: Lieutenant general
- Commands: Deputy Force Commander of Marine and Coastal Defense; Military Partition Commander of Failaka; Director of Iraqi Infantry; Director of the Office of the Commander in Chief of the Iraqi Armed Forces; Commander of Baghdad crackdown operations Deputy Army Chief of Staff Counter Terrorism Command Commander
- Battles/wars: Yom Kippur War; Iran–Iraq War; Gulf War; Iraq War; War in Iraq (2013-2017); Operation Ashura; Siege of Amirli; Battle of Baiji (2014–15); Second Battle of Tikrit; Operation Imposing Law; Operation Phantom Strike; 2014 Northern Iraq offensive; Battle of Ramadi (2015–16); Battle of Mosul (2016–2017)

Abdul Ghani Ajeel al-Asadi (Arabic: عبد الغني الاسدي) is an Iraqi former military officer who served as the commander of the Counter Terrorism Command (CTC) of the Iraqi Special Operations Forces (ISOF).

Born in 1951 in Amarah, Iraq, he first joined the Iraqi Armed Forces in 1968 and first served as an officer in the Iraqi Ground Forces, which he served in until the 2003 invasion of Iraq. After 2003, he was recalled into the military by the post–2003 government of Iraq and was appointed commander of the ISOF's Counter Terrorism Command during the War in Iraq (2013-2017). He retired from the armed forces in 2018.
