= Battle of Baiji =

Battle of Baiji may refer to:

- Battle of Baiji (June 2014), in which ISIL captured the city of Baiji, Iraq
- Battle of Baiji (2014–2015), in which the Iraqi Army and allied Shi'ite militias captured Baiji and the surrounding region
