= Talib Shaghati =

Iraqi military officer

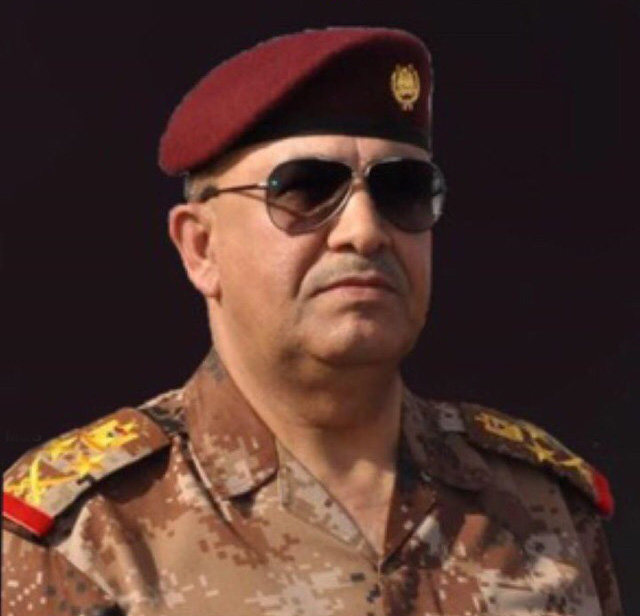
- Born: 1950 (age 75–76); Maysan, Kingdom of Iraq
- Children: 6
- Military career
- Allegiance: Ba'athist Iraq (1968–2003); Iraq (2003–2020)
- Branch: Iraqi Counter Terrorism Service (2007–2020)
- Service years: 1968–2020
- Rank: General
- Conflicts: Yom Kippur War; Iran-Iraq War; Gulf War; Iraq War; War in Iraq (2013–2017); Operation Ashura; Siege of Amirli; Battle of Baiji (2014–15); Second Battle of Tikrit; Operation Imposing Law; Operation Phantom Strike; 2014 Northern Iraq offensive; Battle of Ramadi (2015–16); Battle of Mosul (2016–2017)
- Awards: Knight of the Legion of Honor and "Papacy blessing"

Talib Shaghati Mishari Kinani (Arabic: طالب شغاتي) is a retired Iraqi army general who served as the director of the Iraqi Counter Terrorism Service (ICTS) from 2007 to 2020. Shaghati led the Iraqi Special Operations Forces (ISOF) in critical battles during the War in Iraq (2013–2017). He later received the French Legion of Honour for his role in defeating ISIS. Before his retirement, he held a number of senior positions in the Iraqi Armed Forces.

He graduated from the Rustamiyah Military Academy (course No. 49) in 1970, and after that, he graduated from the College Leadership Course (No. 7) and from the Staff College Course (No. 50). After graduating from the military academy, he served in the field artillery branch. In 1971, he participated in a missile fundamentals course in the Soviet Union. He subsequently served in air defence units. He also participated in the course of the commanders of air defence firing brigades in Egypt in 1983 and completed all courses of the fundamental specialist category.

He worked in a series of air defence positions until he was promoted to the position of brigade commander, then the dean of the Air Defence Institute and finally the dean of the Air Defence College. He received the rank of Air Defence Major General in 2001.

== After 2003 ==
After 2003 he served in the "National Security Council" as a military advisor. In 2005, an order was issued appointing him as a military adviser to the Iraqi Prime Minister. In 2007, he was appointed head of the anti-terrorism agency. This anti-terrorism apparatus was formed in 2007 and linked to the commander-in-chief of the armed forces. In 2014 he was assigned the task of Joint Operations Commander while still leading the anti-terrorist apparatus.

== War against terrorism ==
As the overall commander of ISOF, Shaghati led the counter-terrorism force and played a key role in retaking cities back that were previously controlled by Islamic State during the War in Iraq.

== Accolades ==
In 2017 Shaghati received the French Legion of Honour for his role in defeating ISIS.
