= First Battle of Baiji =

2014 battle

- Part of Iraqi Civil War (2014–2017) and the Salahuddin campaign
| Date | 11–21 June 2014 (1 week and 3 days) |
| Location | Baiji, Saladin, Iraq |
| Result | ISIS victory: Iraqi Army successfully maintains full control of Baiji refinery.; Continued fighting until October 2015 when Iraqi government forces establish full control. |

Belligerents
| Iraq | Islamic State of Iraq and the Levant |

Commanders and leaders
| (Iraq) Nouri al-Maliki | Abu Bakr al-Baghdadi |

Units involved
| Iraqi Armed Forces | Military of ISIL |

Casualties and losses
| 36 killed | 140 killed (claimed by the government) |
- 97 civilians killed and 122 civilians injured

The First Battle of Baiji took place in and around Baiji, Iraq in June 2014. It was fought between Islamic State of Iraq and the Levant (ISIL) forces and those of the Iraqi government. Its first stage included clashes in the city from 11 to 18 June. The second stage was fighting over the control of Baiji oil refinery from 18 to 21 June. Initially, ISIL captured both the town and parts of the refinery, but on 19 June 2014, the Iraqi Army reinstated full control of the refinery in a counter-attack. Fighting continued in Baiji until October 2015, when government forces finally established full control.

== Background ==
On 4 June 2014, the Islamic State of Iraq and the Levant (ISIL) and its allies attacked Mosul launching their northern Iraq offensive. The following day, they started the Salahuddin campaign in Saladin. ISIL and its allies captured Mosul on 10 June 2014. after a six-day battle. When the city fell, there were reports that the group was advancing from Mosul to Kirkuk. After capturing the city, the group freed nearly 1,000 prisoners. On 11 June, ISIL and its allies also started the siege of Amirli.

== The battle ==
On 11 June, around 60 ISIL vehicles entered the city of Baiji. They set the main court house and police station on fire. They also took control of Baiji prison and freed all 2,400 inmates. Later that day, the militants reportedly retreated from Baiji, before the Iraqi Army's Fourth Armored Division arrived in the city, allegedly due to persuasion from local tribal leaders. However, the next day it was confirmed ISIL was still in control of the town.

On 18 June, ISIL attacked the oil refinery near Baiji. An official inside the refinery stated the militants had captured 75 percent of the facility, while a military spokesman claimed the attack had been repelled, with 40 militants killed. On 19 June, Iraqi government forces launched a counter-attack and claimed to have regained full control of the oil refinery after heavy fighting that left 100 militants dead. ISIL created watchtowers and checkpoints within Baiji. On 20 June 2014, ISIL forces surrounded the refinery and attacked it for a second time, but failed to capture it. They launched a third attack on 21 June, killing 36 Iraqi soldiers, but failed to recapture the refinery.

== Aftermath ==
On 29 October 2014, the operation to recapture the city of Baiji begun. Fighting continued for approximately a year until the Iraqi armed forces and the PMF fully liberated Baiji in October 2015. In 2019, the city was under Iraqi control but had faced periodic ISIL attacks. The city's infrastructure has been severely damaged by the prolonged fighting.
