= Abdul-Wahab al-Saadi =

Iraqi General

General Abdul-Wahab al-Saadi
- عبد الوهاب الساعدي
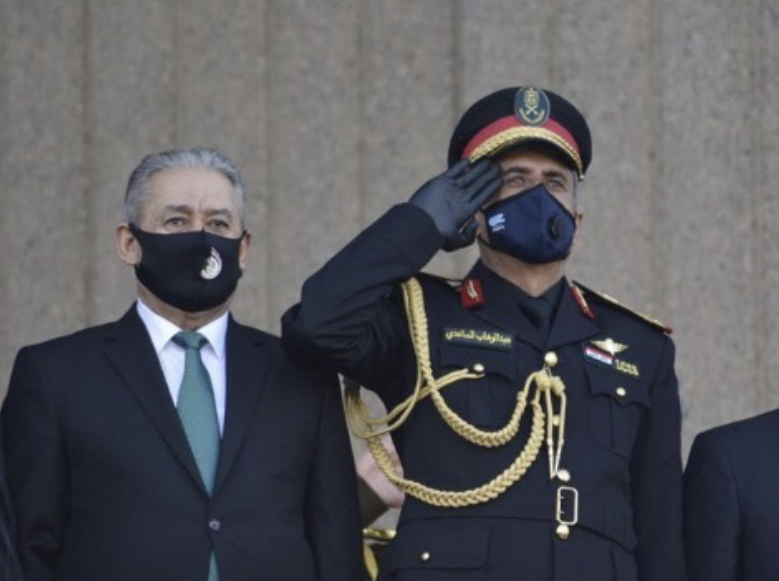
- Al-Saadi (right) in 2021
- Born: 1963 (age 62–63); Baghdad, Iraqi Republic
- Military career
- Allegiance: Iraq
- Branch: Iraqi Ground Forces; ISOF
- Service years: 1983–present
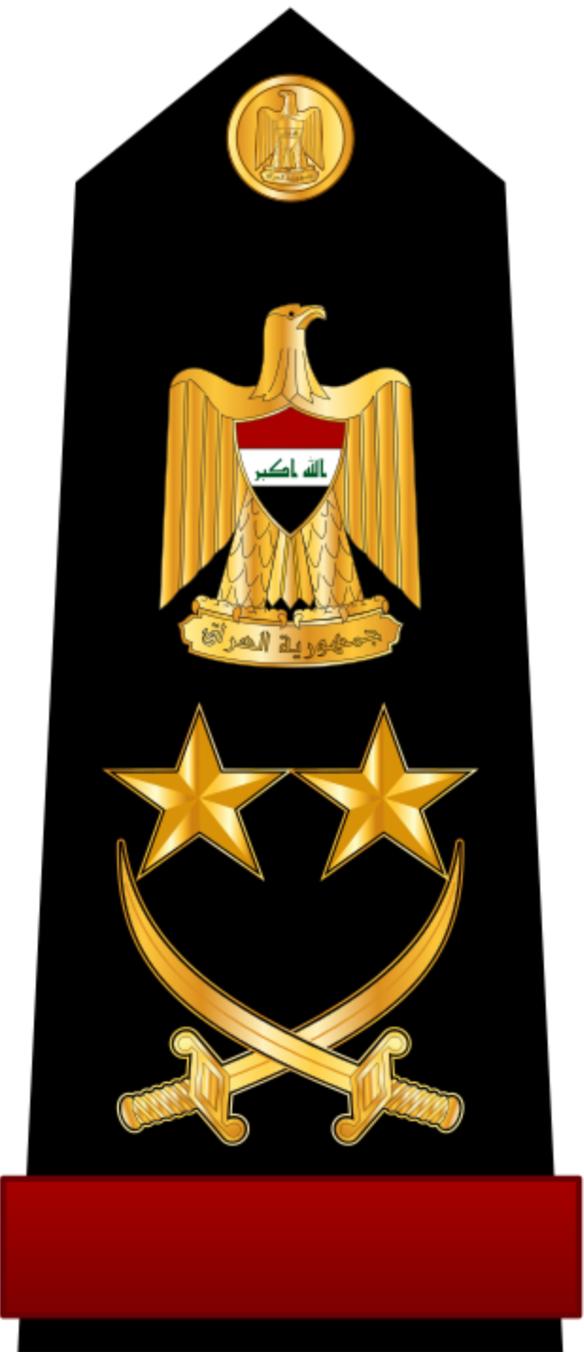
- Rank: General
- Commands: Counter Terrorism Service
- Conflicts: Iran–Iraq War; Operation Karbala-8; Battle of the Marshes; Siege of Basra; Tawakalna ala Allah Operations; Gulf War; Iraq War; War in Iraq (2013-17); Battle of Baiji (2014–15) (WIA); Second Battle of Tikrit; Battle of Fallujah (2016); Battle of Mosul (2016–17); Hawija offensive (2017)
- Awards: Knight of the National Order of the Legion of Honour (French: Ordre national de la Légion d'honneur)

Abdul-Wahab al-Saadi (Arabic: عبد الوهاب الساعدي) is an Iraqi general who served as the director of the Iraqi Counter-Terrorism Service from 2020 to 2023. Al-Saadi rose to fame during the war against ISIS when his contributions as an ISOF commander received much media coverage. He played a critical role in the defeat of ISIS in Iraq, and in 2022 he received the French Legion of Honour.

== Early life and education ==
Al-Saadi is born in 1963 in Al-Thawra District, Baghdad.

Al-Saadi graduated from the University of Mosul in northern Iraq with a bachelor's degree in physics. He then graduated from the Iraqi Military College with a rank of lieutenant, then graduated from the Iraqi Military Joint Staff College in 1996.

== Career ==
Al-Saadi was the overall operations commander of Iraqi government forces in Battle of Baiji (2014–15), Second Battle of Tikrit, Third Battle of Fallujah (2016), and the Hawija offensive (2017) in the war against ISIL.

Peter Bergen wrote that al-Saadi played a critical role in the overall defeat of ISIS in Iraq.

In September 2019, al-Saadi was removed from his office as second-in-command of ICTS by then Iraqi Prime Minister Adel Abdul Mahdi and transferred to work in the Ministry of Defense, without mentioning the reasons for the decision. Al-Saadi said that the decision was at the request of the head of the Counter-Terrorism Agency, General Talib Shaghati and that it was considered "insulting to him and his military history." Many politicians, media and activists considered the decision unfair. The firing could be considered one of the reasons for protests that escalated into street clashes resulting in thousands of deaths. After getting promoted to General, on May 10, 2020, newly appointed prime minister Mustafa Al-Kadhimi promoted Al-Saedi to lead the counterterrorism service. He was succeeded as head of ICTS by General Karim Abboud Al-Tamimi on November 1, 2023.

== Accolades ==
In 2022, Al-Saadi received the French Legion of Honour for his outstanding role in defeating ISIS.
