= Battle of Ramadi (2015–2016) =

Battle between Iraq and ISIL

- Part of the Iraqi civil war and the Anbar campaign (2015–2016)
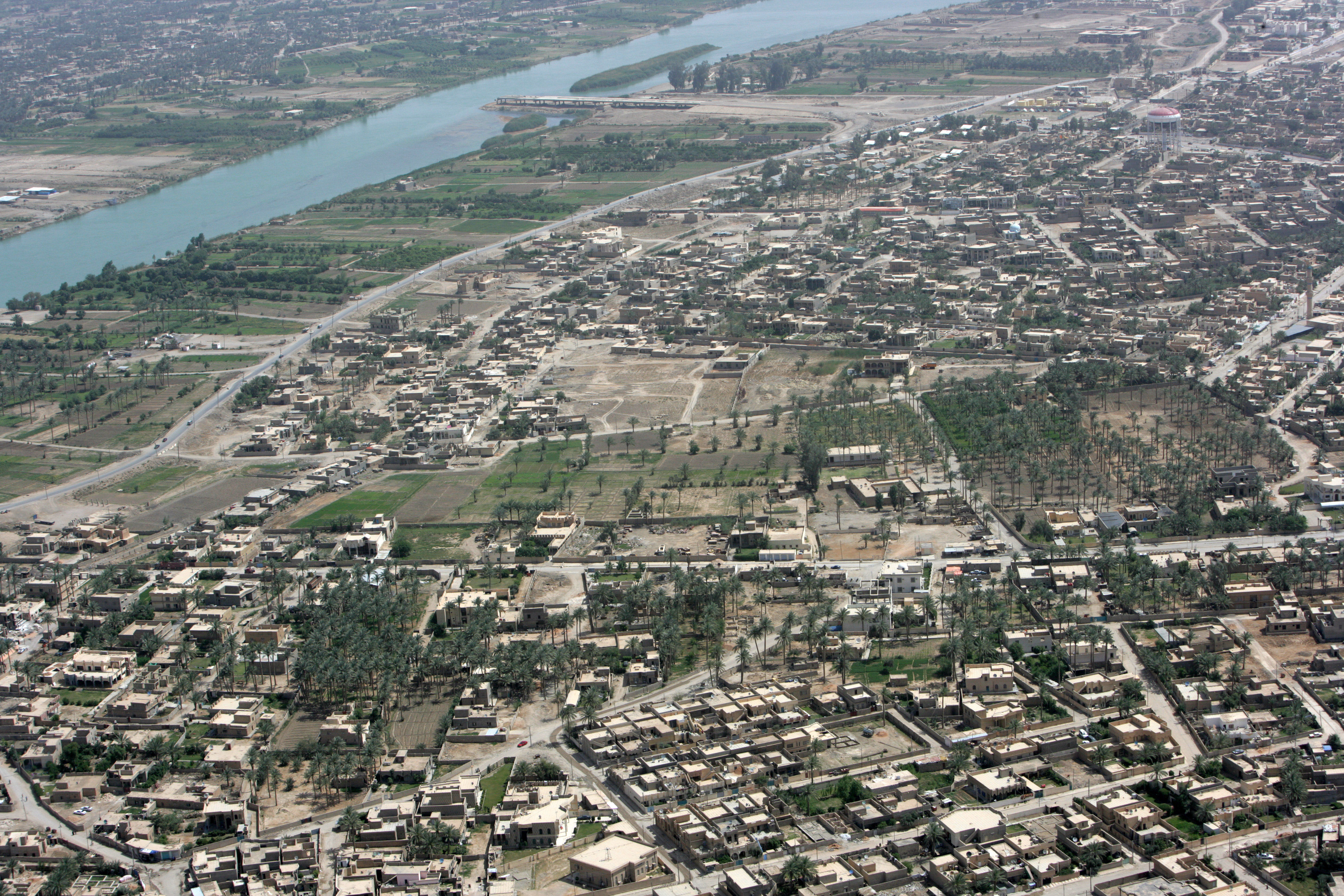
- Ramadi in 2008
Date	11 August 2015 – 9 February 2016 (5 months, 4 weeks and 1 day)
Location	Ramadi, Anbar Governorate, Iraq 33.416°N 43.3°E
Result	Iraqi government victory
Territorial changes	Iraqi forces recapture Ramadi and its suburbs; 80% of Ramadi city is destroyed during the fighting

Belligerents
Iraq: Iraqi security forces; Armed Forces; Federal Police; Local Sunni tribes; Shia militias (not directly involved in the city proper); Air support: United States; United Kingdom; Australia; France; Canada	Islamic State of Iraq and the Levant

Commanders and leaders
(Iraq) Haider al-Abadi (Iraq) Maj. General Hadi Ruzaiq (Iraq) Lt. Gen. Othman Farhoud al-Ghanimi (Iraq) Maj. Gen. Fadhil Barwari (ICTS commander)	Abu Bakr al-Baghdadi (Leader); Dohan al-Rawi † (ISIL War Minister); Abu Waheeb (Top ISIL Commander in Anbar); Khaled al-Sadoun † (ISIL Governor of Anbar Province); Abu Bakr (POW) (Top ISIL commander in Ramadi); Abu Ahmed al-Alwani † (Senior commander); Hatem al-Bilawi † Mustafa Jassim †

Strength
10,000 Iraqi soldiers: 2,500+ Iraqi tribal fighters; 3,000+ Shi'ite militiamen (Only in Ramadi's outskirts)	1,100–6,000

Casualties and losses
297 killed, 1000+ wounded	1,036 killed
- 500,000 civilians displaced 143+ civilians killed
- Location within Iraq

The Battle of Ramadi was a battle launched by the forces of Iraq to successfully recapture the city of Ramadi from the Islamic State of Iraq and the Levant (ISIL), which had taken the city earlier in 2015 in a previous battle. Air power was a major component of the battle, with the United States and other nations conducting over 850 airstrikes in the Ramadi area from July 2015 to late February 2016, and the US crediting airstrikes with 80% of the reason why the city was recaptured. By February 2016, Iraqi forces successfully recaptured the city after two and a half months of fighting. It was predicted that it would take several months to clear the city of the bombs ISIL left behind, with at least 9 months needed to clear the city's Tamim District. At the time, Ramadi had suffered more damage than any other city or town in Iraq with some estimates as high as 90% of the city being destroyed during the fighting.

== Background ==
=== ISIL capture of Ramadi ===
On May 17, 2015, ISIL militants captured the city of Ramadi, after launching multiple waves of suicide attacks during a sandstorm, which caused Iraqi forces to retreat from the city.

=== Anbar offensive ===
On the dawn of July 13, the Iraqi Army, backed by the Shiite and Sunni pro-government militias, launched an offensive to recapture Anbar province. The Iraqi forces also reportedly pushed towards Ramadi from the west and the south. By afternoon, the Iraqi Army retook the Ramadi Olympic stadium in western Ramadi and reached the eastern part of the city. According to Iraqi officials, pro-government fighters also pushed the extremists from the areas east of Ramadi. On August 11, a senior official with the US-led coalition said that Iraqi forces had surrounded the city and were preparing for a final assault to retake it. On August 26, ISIL suicide bombers killed two Iraqi army generals and three soldiers north of Fallujah. Maj. Gen. Abdul-Rahman Abu-Regheef, deputy chief of operations in Anbar, and Brig. Gen. Safeen Abdul-Majid, commander of the 10th Army Division were both killed.

By late September, the operation to retake Ramadi was considered to have stalled, with Iraqi Security Forces positioned on the outskirts of Ramadi, but unable to mount an incursion into the city proper. Political squabbles between Iranian backed militias and the Abadi administration were also hampering potential offensives. On September 25, the United States urged the Iraqi Army to hasten the operation, acknowledging that "...the Iraqis have not made any significant forward movement recently."

In early October, Iraqi forces renewed their operations in Ramadi, capturing several areas to the north and west, including the main road west of Ramadi. By October 13, Iraqi troops had advanced 15 kilometers and encircled the city, according to US officials.

In mid-November, Iraqi forces recaptured the emergency directorate headquarters in Ramadi.

== The battle ==
=== Completing the siege ===
On November 25, 2015, the Iraqi Army launched the offensive to retake Ramadi, cutting ISIL's last supply line into the city of Ramadi, via the Euphrates River, by seizing the strategic Palestine Bridge. The operation at Palestine Bridge and other areas in northwestern Ramadi were supported by 7 Coalition airstrikes.

On November 29, the Iraqi Army began dropping leaflets into Ramadi, warning of an imminent offensive and warning civilians to flee. However, only a few families managed to flee, since ISIL had closed off the corridor in southeastern Ramadi designated by the Iraqi Government, and ISIL also locked down the city, threatening to kill anyone who tried to escape.

=== Battle for the city center ===
On December 4, Iraqi forces began advancing towards Ramadi's southwestern Tamim District, from the Anbar University and Tash District areas. On December 8, Iraqi forces pushed into Ramadi city for the first time since the beginning of the offensive, capturing Tamim, a key district in the southwestern area of Ramadi, separated from the rest of Ramadi city by the al-Waar River, a tributary of the Euphrates. The Iraqi Army also recaptured the Anbar Operation Control Center, near the Palestine Bridge. The battle was claimed to be a resounding success, with Iraqi Counter-Terrorism Service spokesman Sabah al-Numani telling the AFP news agency that after troops launched their assault on Tamim, ISIL militants "had no choice except to surrender or fight" and that they were "completely destroyed". After the advances, the Iraqi Government claimed that it had recaptured 60% of the Ramadi area from ISIL, although most of the city proper still remained under ISIL control. During the operation to capture the Tamim District, 350 ISIL militants were killed by US-led Coalition airstrikes. On December 10, ISIL forces blew up the Warrar Dam, which linked the Anbar Operations Control Center to northwestern Ramadi city, leaving the Qassim Bridge as the last working bridge in Ramadi, which runs from al-Tamim into the southern al-Humaira District.

On December 15, two RAF Typhoon FGR4s supported the Iraqi army in its operations around Ramadi, and struck an ISIL encampment with two Paveway IVs. The next day, RAF Tornados assisted the Iraqi troops battling ISIL on the outskirts of Ramadi, and used Paveway IVs to destroy heavy machine-gun positions, a sniper team and a group of fighters.

On 18 December 2015, the 55th Brigade of the Iraqi Armed Forces called in a U.S airstrike to cover their advance because their army helicopters would not fly due to bad weather. The airstrike misfired by a few kilometers and hit the Iraqi army, killing 9 soldiers including one officer and army commander.

Later on December 20, a second pair of GR4s flew a reconnaissance mission over Ramadi, where they provided surveillance assistance to an attack by other Coalition aircraft. On December 20, Iraqi planes also dropped leafets into Ramadi again, warning civilians to leave the city within 72 hours.

On December 22, Iraqi forces advanced into the center of the city of Ramadi, and headed towards the main government complex. The 3-pronged attack was launched from al-Tamim and al-Humaira Districts in the southwest and south, northwards into the central al-Hoz District, and the Andalus and al-Malab Districts further east. Iraqi forces had constructed a temporary bridge over the al-Warrar River, allowing them to cross over into the southern Hoz District, where they reportedly surprised the ISIL forces there. Two pairs of RAF Tornados and an RAF Reaper, provided the Iraqis with continuous close air support alongside other coalition aircraft. When ISIL fighters fired rocket-propelled grenades and small arms at Iraqi soldiers tending to wounded personnel, the Tornados intervened with a very accurate Paveway strike. The Reaper, meanwhile, assisted other Coalition aircraft in an attack that destroyed an anti-aircraft gun. Fighting continued the next day, while Iraqi reinforcements, including US-trained Sunni tribal fighters were sent to secure the recaptured parts of Ramadi, in order to allow the first wave of troops to continue pushing toward the government complex in the city centre. On December 23, 2 flights of RAF Tornado GR4s were contributing to the coalition air effort which supported the Iraqi army's offensive into the centre of Ramadi, the Tornados targets included three terrorist teams armed with rocket propelled grenades, a sniper position, an ISIL group in close combat with Iraqi troops, and a large group of at least 17 terrorists, who suffered a direct hit in 6 attacks, again with Paveway IVs. By December 25, Iraqi and allied tribal forces had managed to enter the al-Haouz District, and also were about 500 meters away from the main government complex. RAF Tornados maintained close air support over Ramadi, once again working closely with other coalition aircraft, they used Paveway IVs against 2 terrorist teams, an anti-aircraft gun, and a massed ISIL group who were assembling for an attempted counterattack on the successful Iraqi advance. On December 26, Iraqi forces captured the Ramadi Barrage, in northwestern Ramadi city, and evacuated 120 civilian families from the city.

On December 27, the Iraqi Army captured the government complex, after which they declared victory in Ramadi, and claimed to be in full control of the city center. ISIL militants were reported to have fled northeast. However, fighting was still reported southwest of the government complex, as pockets of ISIL resistance remained. On December 28, Iraqi forces completely recaptured the city center of Ramadi, after the remaining ISIL forces withdrew from the government complex and the surrounding areas in the Hoz District. However, on the same day, it was confirmed that ISIL was still in control of 30 percent of the city. On December 29, RAF Typhoons and Tornado GR4s operated over Ramadi, as the Iraqi forces closed in on remaining pockets of ISIL militants. The Typhoons bombed two machine gun positions, while the Tornadoes conducted three attacks on a further two machine gun nests and a strongpoint. Despite bad weather meaning that these attacks had to be carried out through thick cloud and with Iraqi soldiers in close proximity to the targets, careful planning by the aircrew and the precision guidance systems of the Paveway IV bombs allowed all the attacks to be successful without risk to friendly forces. During the week of the final offensive on central Ramadi, an estimated 400 ISIL fighters were killed.

=== Clearing the city ===
On December 30, 2015, the Iraqi Prime Minister Haider al-Abadi visited Ramadi and raised the Iraqi flag at the government complex. During his visit, ISIL forces in a part of the city still under their control fired three mortar rounds at his position; they landed 500 meters away, but the incident forced al-Abadi to leave the area. ISIL casualties during the battle were reportedly high, while Iraqi Army casualties were relatively moderate . Two RAF Tornado GR4s provided close air support over Ramadi, where they bombed machine gun positions engaged in close combat with Iraqi troops, and assisted another coalition aircraft in a strike on an ISIL team armed with rocket propelled grenades. On December 31, ISIL executed 40 civilians who tried to flee the city to areas controlled by the Iraqi Army.

On January 3, 2016, ISIL attacked and briefly seized an Iraqi Army base of the 10th Division in Al Tarah, using suicide car bombers and fighters wearing explosive belts. However, the base was retaken by the Iraqi army with the help of coalition airstrikes on the same day. Three Iraqi soldiers were killed and 17 wounded in the attack. Around the same time, the US estimated that there were still 700 ISIL militants holed up in pockets of central and eastern Ramadi, indicating that there were at least 700 more ISIL militants in the city than had been initially estimated; the figure was confirmed by Iraqi officials. RAF Typhoons delivered four successful attacks in Ramadi against terrorist positions, including a mortar team. A second Typhoon mission over Ramadi conducted no less than six attacks, accounting for five machine-guns and a sniper position.

On January 3, 2016, the Iraqi Government declared that it had recaptured 80% of Ramadi city, and that the only pockets of ISIL resistance in the city proper remaining were located in the al-Malab and 20th Street areas. On January 4, 2016, a British official stated that the number of ISIL militants remaining in Ramadi had been reduced to around 400 fighters. RAF Tornado GR4s provided close air support to the Iraqi army as they continued their operations to eliminate the remaining terrorist fighters in and around Ramadi. When an Iraqi unit came under rocket-propelled grenade and mortar fire from several ISIL-held buildings, the GR4s conducted accurate strikes on all four buildings using Paveway IVs. The Tornadoes were tasked to deal with a group of terrorists who were preparing for a counter-attack. Despite this being a difficult target for most weapons, the GR4s were able to score a direct hit with a Brimstone missile. An RAF Reaper was also patrolling over Ramadi; it provided surveillance support for three air strikes by coalition fast jets, and also conducted two attacks using its own weapons, employing a GBU-12 laser guided bomb against an ISIL machine-gun team, and destroyed two terrorist trucks with a single Hellfire missile.

On January 5, 2016, the Iraqi Army captured the Bruwana District, in the western part of Ramadi. On the same day, the Iraqi Government reported that aerial bombardments in the western part of Ramadi had killed 250 ISIL militants, and destroyed 100 vehicles that were used by ISIL. Later on, it was revealed that ISIL War Minister Dohan al-Rawi had been killed in the bombing, which had followed a five-hour siege on his position. On January 6, ISIL was reported to have detonated large parts of the Ramadi General Hospital, and moved the civilians present to other parts of the city that they controlled, before the arrival of the Iraqi Army. Later on the same day, US Colonel Steve Warren stated that another 60 ISIL militants had been killed in Ramadi in the past day, and that only a handful of "squad-size ISIS units" remained in Ramadi, numbering no more than 12 militants per group. It was estimated that only 300 ISIL militants remained in Ramadi at that point. On January 7, the Iraqi Army announced that it had recaptured the Ramadi General Hospital and reached the Ramadi Great Mosque. It was also reported that ISIL had detonated the hospital's ground floor.

Around that time, the Iraqi military slowed down its operations, to try to minimize civilian casualties, as they reported that ISIL was using civilians as human shields. ISIL continued to have a strong presence in the eastern part of the city.

On January 8, the Iraqi Army recaptured the al-Malab District in southeastern Ramadi. On the same day, the OHCHR reported that the Iraqi Army had saved 1,000 civilians trapped in Ramadi, who were transferred to refugee camps in Habbaniyah. On the next day, the Iraqi Army recaptured the Andalus District, Ramadi Great Mosque, and Maaref University, in eastern Ramadi. On the same day, a Coalition airstrike reportedly killed 25 ISIL commanders in eastern Ramadi. On January 10, the Iraqi Army rescued another 635 civilians from eastern Ramadi, who were then sent to Habbaniyah. It was also reported that ISIL's control of Ramadi had been reduced to seven districts on the eastern outskirts of Ramadi. However, the bombs left behind by ISIL across Ramadi were slowing down the progress of Iraqi forces in clearing the city, and consequently, most of the city still remained off-limits to civilians. On January 11, the Iraqi Government announced that the Anbar Security Department had been recaptured. On January 12, Iraqi forces evacuated another 250 civilians from the Sajjariyah and al-Sofiyah Districts, on the eastern outskirts of Ramadi. On January 12, it was also reported that ISIL executed several fighters who fled Ramadi, by burning them alive in the town square of Mosul. Later, it was reported that since the offensive for central Ramadi began in late December 2015, 600+ ISIL militants had been killed in the city proper.

=== Operations slow, clearing the outskirts ===
On January 13, the Iraqi Army recaptured the al-Sofiyah and Albu Aitha Districts on the eastern outskirts of Ramadi, after giving civilians 2 days to leave the area. At least 30 ISIL militants were killed and 12 others were captured; 10 Iraqi soldiers were killed in the clashes. This left ISIL in control of only the Albu Sawdah, Albu Mahl, Albu Khalifa, Albu Ghanem, and Sajjariyah Districts on the eastern outskirts of Ramadi, where no more than 200 ISIL militants were estimated to be holding out, and where up to 700 families were still being held hostage by ISIL. Later on the same day, Iraqi forces evacuated another 60 families from the recently recaptured al-Sofiyah District. On January 14, the Iraqi Army recaptured the Sura area and Albu Sawdah District on Ramadi's eastern outskirts, killing at least 10 ISIL militants. On the same day, the Iraqi Army evacuated another 800 civilians from the outskirts of eastern Ramadi. On January 15, an Iraqi General stated that his men had moved over 3,000 civilians out of Ramadi during the battle. On January 16, the Iraqi Army recaptured the Albu Khalifa and Albu Mahl Districts, near al-Sofiyah, killing 15 ISIL militants. On January 17, Iraqi forces fully secured the Greater al-Sofiya District, including the Albu Ghanem neighborhood, which was located in the eastern part of the Greater al-Sofiyah District, leaving the nearby Sajjariyah District as the only district that ISIL controlled in Ramadi. 90 ISIL militants were killed in the clashes that took place throughout the al-Sofiyah District within the previous several days. On the same day, another 117+ ISIL militants were killed in the clashes in eastern Ramadi, as Iraqi forces advanced southeastward from al-Sofiyah and northward from Husaiybah, entering the Sajjariyah District from the north and the south. 12 Iraqi soldiers were killed, along with 13 civilians in the Albu Ghanem District, who were trying to flee ISIL forces.

By January 18, over 3,800 civilians had been evacuated from Ramadi by Iraqi forces. On January 20, Iraqi forces began moving eastward to Khalidiya Island, after clearing ISIL-held neighborhoods near the area. On January 21, US Vice President Joe Biden congratulated the Iraqi Security Forces for liberating the city of Ramadi from ISIL control, during a meeting with Iraqi Prime Minister al-Abadi. On January 22, Iraqi forces destroyed an ISIL tunnel that linked al-Madiq to Husaiybah, east of Ramadi. On the same day, Iraqi forces entered the Sajjariyah District, as well as ISIL-held areas in the Joabah and Husaiybah Districts, to the east of Ramadi. It was also reported that ISIL resistance in those areas had become weak, and that the civilian families trapped there were located far from the site of the clashes. On 20 January, it was reported that US-led airstrikes in Ramadi, during the battle for the city center in the last week of December 2015, killed 1,036 ISIL militants.

On January 23, ISIL launched suicide attacks in the Kilo 70 area west of Ramadi, and in the Tal Msheheidah east of Ramadi, as well as areas to the north of Ramadi; the ensuing clashes and airstrikes led to the deaths of 62 ISIL militants and 48 Iraqi fighters. On January 24, Iraqi Defense Minister said that the Iraqi Army was preparing for an offensive on Mosul, stating that the Iraqi Army and Coalition forces had defeated ISIL in Ramadi. Later on the same day, 190 people suspected of having links ISIL were arrested in Ramadi, and Anbar police Chief Maj. General Hadi Rezeig announced that the Iraqi Security Forces had managed to fully recapture the city of Ramadi. Around the same time, fighting shifted to the Husaiybah District, to the east of Ramadi. Later on January 24, the Anbar Tribal Force reported that during the past two weeks, 700 ISIL militants had been killed in the clashes in Ramadi. The Anbar Tribal Force also said that it was concerned about the fate of a few hundred civilians in Ramadi, who had gone missing during the battle. On January 26, the Iraqi Army found and destroyed the ISIL headquarters in eastern Ramadi, in the al-Sofiyah District, killing at least six ISIL militants. On the same day, the Iraqi Government uncovered a mass grave in central Ramadi, containing the bodies of 40 civilians.

On January 27, the Iraqi Army repelled an ISIL suicide attack in the al-Sofiyah District, killing the driver of the car bomb. On the same day, more than a dozen suicide bombers launched two attacks north and west of Ramadi, killing 55 Iraqi soldiers and other pro-government fighters, when ISIL attacked the headquarters of the Iraqi Army's 10th Division and an Army barracks. At this point, it was reported that pockets of ISIL resistance remained in Ramadi's eastern Sajjariyah neighborhood. On January 28, ISIL suicide bombers targeted an Iraqi army division headquarters in the al-Thirthar area of Ramadi. Four were killed in Coalition airstrikes, but two attacked the main gate of the headquarters, killing 17 Iraqi soldiers, including seven officers, and wounding 46 soldiers. Separately, 15 Iraqi soldiers were killed, and 20 were wounded elsewhere in the city, in a combination of suicide attacks, sniper fire, and roadside bombs. On the same day, the Iraqi Government announced that 95% of Ramadi city had been liberated, with the Sajjariyah District being the only part of the city that remained under ISIL control. The last ISIL militants near Ramadi were also said to be holed up in an area between Sajjariyah and Husaiybah.

On February 1, the Iraqi Army launched an offensive on the Khalidiya Island area, which is the region located between the villages Albu Nasir and Albu Shajal, situated between Ramadi and Fallujah. On February 2, around 300 ISIL fighters were estimated to be remaining in Ramadi's eastern Sajjariyah District, and in the nearby areas. On February 10, 9 Iraqi soldiers from the army's 8th Division were killed by ISIL shelling, in the Sajjariyah District.

Early on February 4, the Iraqi Army entered the central part of the Sajjariyah District, killing more than 17 ISIL militants. Later on the same day, the Iraqi Army recaptured the Sajjariyah District. The 2015–2016 Battle of Ramadi was the first time since the Fall of Mosul in which the Iraqi Army played the primary role in combating ISIL.

=== Offensive continues into Husaiybah ===
On February 7, during a security operation in the al-Sofiyah District in eastern Ramadi, a booby-trapped house exploded, killing 6 Iraqi soldiers and wounding 5 others. On the same day, ISIL executed more civilians in the Juwaybah District, to the east of Ramadi, by firing squad.

On February 8, the Iraqi Army recaptured the Juwaybah District, to the east of Ramadi, east of the Sajjariyah District. It was reported that the Iraqi forces killed dozens of ISIL militants and released the civilians that were being held by ISIL in the district. On 9 February, government forces seized the final pocket of ISIL resistance in the Husayba Al-Sharqiyah District, which was the last ISIL-held village to the east of Ramadi, thus fully expelling ISIL from the area of Ramadi. Dozens of ISIL militants were killed in the clashes in Husaiybah. The Iraqi Army also began evacuating 1,500 civilians from the Husaiybah Al-Sharqiyah District. Afterwards, the Iraqi Government reopened the Ramadi-Habbaniyah Highway.

== Aftermath ==
On February 2, the Iraqi Army severed the last supply lines between the Khalidiya Island region and the city of Fallujah, completely besieging the city. This led to concerns that an estimated 30,000 civilians trapped in Fallujah would starve, due to the lack of airdropped supplies into the city. On February 4, after Ramadi city was recaptured from ISIL, offensive operations shifted further eastward to the Khalidiya Island area.

On February 9, it was reported that ISIL militants were still holed up in some farmlands in Khalidiya Island, to the north of the town of Al Khalidiya. On February 10, it was reported that the Iraqi Army had fully recaptured the Khalidiya District, including the Khalidiya Island area. On February 13, it was reported that the Iraqi Security Forces had removed 300 IEDs from the area between eastern Ramadi and Khalidiya. On February 14, an Iraqi airstrike killed an ISIL commander in the Kartan area of the Khalidiya District, along with 14 other ISIL militants. Later on the same day, the Iraqi Government reported that the Sedikiyah area in the eastern Khalidiya District was ready for the return of displaced civilians, after IEDs left behind by ISIL in the area had been dismantled.

It was predicted that it would take several months to fully clear Ramadi of the bombs left behind by ISIL; at least 9 months would be needed to clear the Tamim District alone without additional funds. It was also reported that as of thus far, Ramadi had suffered more damage than any other town or city in Iraq.

On February 16, a mass grave containing the bodies of 50 civilians was uncovered in the al-Sofiya District of eastern Ramadi. On the same day, the Iraqi Army launched a clearing operation in the Hamidiyah District, to the northeast of Ramadi's Albu Ghanem District. On February 19, the Iraqi Army completely cleared the Hamidiyah District from ISIL forces, killing dozens of ISIL fighters.

On February 18, a large number of local Sunni tribesmen revolted against ISIL, after ISIL beat a woman, among other restrictive practices enforces by ISIL's Al-Hisbah secret police, amid an ongoing siege. ISIL was reported to have withdrawn into Fallujah city, after local Sunnis burned the Al-Hisbah headquarters and clashes spread. On February 20, it was estimated that only 1,000 civilians were living in and around the Ramadi area, after the fierce clashes that erupted during the battle for the city. On February 20, the clashes began to die down as ISIL began carrying out mass arrests, and it was reported that there were still some Sunni fighters who were pinned down in parts of Fallujah, who would likely be massacred if the Iraqi Government or the US-led Coalition does not intervene. On February 21, the US-led Coalition bombed an ISIL gathering in Khalidiya Island, killing 7 ISIL leaders. On the same day, the Iraqi Army began shelling ISIL positions on the outskirts of Fallujah, in support of the Sunni tribal fighters. Late on February 21, ISIL crushed the revolt, and detained 180 men. However, on the same day, the Iraqi Army deployed reinforcements to Fallujah, in preparation to storm the city. On February 23, the Iraqi Army fully recaptured the town of Al-Karmah, after they destroyed ISIL's last stronghold in the town.

On February 27, Anbar Provincial Council announced that 15 members of the Iraqi army and police were killed during the dismantling of improvised explosive devices and booby-trapped houses in Ramadi.

On February 28, Iraqi government forces repelled a massive ISIL suicide attack in Abu Ghraib and western Baghdad, which was the largest attack carried out by the group in the area in nearly 2 years. The assault left 30 ISIL militants and 30 Iraqi soldiers dead.

Eventually, on 26 June 2016 the Iraqi Army fully recaptured Al-Fallujah and an Iraqi commander declared it 'fully liberated' from ISIL.

== USA support and future tactics ==
With 80% of Ramadi left in ruins after months of heavy bombing, as well as scorched earth tactics employed by ISIL, the US and its allies allocated over $50 million to rebuild the city. It was reported that Ramadi had suffered more damage than any other city or town in Iraq at the time with some estimates as high as 90% of the city being destroyed during the fighting. Due to the offensive's success, the tactics of encirclement and airstrikes used in Ramadi were applied to Fallujah, which was captured by ISIL in January 2014.

== See also ==
- Al-Hawl offensive
- Battle of Baiji (2014–2015)
- Battle of Baiji (October–December 2014)
- December 2014 Sinjar offensive
- Derna Campaign (2014–2015)
- Fall of Hīt (2014)
- Fall of Mosul
- First Battle of Tikrit
- List of wars and battles involving ISIL
- Military intervention against ISIL
  - American-led intervention in Syria
- Mosul offensive (2015)
- November 2015 Sinjar offensive
- Second Battle of Tikrit (March–April 2015)
- Siege of Amirli
- Siege of Kobanî
- Sinjar massacre
- Tishrin Dam offensive
- Al-Shaddadi offensive (2016)
