= Salahuddin campaign =

2016 military campaign against the Islamic State

- Part of the War in Iraq (2013-2017) and the Military intervention against ISIL
- A map of the Salahuddin Province, located in north-central Iraq, north of the capital city of Baghdad
Date	5 June 2014 – 8 October 2016 (2 years, 4 months and 3 days)
Location	Salahuddin Province, Iraq
Result	Major Iraqi victory: Iraqi Government forces retakes nearly all ISIL-held parts of the province.: First Battle of Baiji (ISIL victory); Siege of Amirli (Iraqi victory); First Battle of Tikrit (ISIL victory); Second Battle of Baiji (Iraqi victory); Dhuluiya offensive (Iraqi victory); Second Battle of Tikrit (Iraqi victory); Battle for Shirqat (Iraqi victory)
Territorial changes	The eastern, central, and southern parts of the Salahuddin Province are captured by Iraqi Security Forces, by late October 2016

Belligerents
Iraq; Kurdistan Region Iranian-led intervention: Iran; Hezbollah; Shia militias: Asa'ib Ahl al-Haq; Badr Organization; Kata'ib Hezbollah; Muqawimun U.S.-led intervention: United States; United Kingdom; Canada; France	Islamic State of Iraq and the Levant

Commanders and leaders
(Iraq) Haidar al-Abadi (Iraq) Khaled Obeidi (Iraq) General Ayub Khalif † (Iraq) Saleh Jaber; Akram al-Kaabi; Hadi Al-Amiri (Iran) Qasem Soleimani (United States) Barack Obama (United Kingdom) David Cameron (until 2016) (United Kingdom) Theresa May (from 2016) (Canada) Stephen Harper (until 2015) (Canada) Justin Trudeau (from 2015) (France) François Hollande	Abu Ayman al-Iraqi † (Head of Military Shura); Abu Muslim al-Turkmani † (Deputy, Iraq); Abu Nabil al-Anbari † (ISIL Governor of the Saladin Governorate); Abu Maria † (Top ISIL leader in Tikrit)

Units involved
(Iraq) Iraqi Armed Forces; Peshmerga (Iran) Iranian Armed Forces: Qods Force; IRIAF; United States Air Force; Royal Air Force Royal Canadian Air Force; French Air Force	Military of ISIL Anti-Government fighters: GMCIR; JRTN

Strength
20,000–30,000+	19,000+

Casualties and losses
10,000+ killed or executed 4,000+ captured	4,000 killed
- 46 civilians killed 28,000 civilians displaced 28,000 civilians displaced 100 civilians abducted by ISIL

The Salahuddin campaign was a military conflict in the Saladin Governorate (Salahuddin Governorate), located in north-central Iraq, involving various factions (both internal & external) fighting against a single common enemy, the Islamic State of Iraq and the Levant. The province exited Iraqi government control during ISIL's Northern Iraq offensive (June 2014) when large swathes of the north of the country were captured by the militant group with the Iraqi national army quickly disintegrating in the path of its advance. In light of the sweeping gains of the militants, Nouri Al-Maliki, the Prime Minister of Iraq at that time, attempted to declare a state of emergency though the Iraqi Parliament blocked his efforts to do so.

The cities of Baiji and Tikrit (Saddam Hussein's birthplace and stronghold) fell to ISIS and the group even reached the city of Samarra itself but could not wrest control of it due to the resistance it encountered by the Iraqi security forces in conjunction with the Shi'ite paramilitaries. Both the United States and Iran intervened in order to stem the tide against ISIS and were relatively successful in the breaking of the Siege of Amirli in which both parties played a significant role (however they did not and still do not officially cooperate or coordinate their respective efforts with one another). Although in the First Battle of Tikrit ISIS consolidated their control over the city and strongly repulsed any attempts at its recapture by Iraqi security forces and militia contingents.

After months of preparatory maneuvers and intelligence gathering, a force of over 23,000 allied fighters including the Iraqi armed forces, Shi'ite private militias and Sunni tribal militias began an offensive in early March to encircle ISIL and entrap their fighters in Tikrit and its environs in the Second Battle of Tikrit. The operation met with decisive success, with all the ISIL militants being encircled and subsequently killed or captured in Tikrit.

== ISIL gains in 2014 ==
In the aftermath of the U.S. invasion of Iraq back in 2003 the insurgency in the Sunni areas of the country took on a distinct Islamist nature of their own. After the departure of the U.S. from Iraq the insurgency gained some long-lost momentum and the casualty statistics started to increase once again. However, it was not until the advent of the Syrian Civil War that the instability created in a neighbouring country provided the fertile ground for the group formerly known as Al-Qaeda in Iraq to blossom into a formidable and distinct rebel-faction strong enough to eventually turn on the lesser rebel groups and easily expel them from eastern Syria and soon establish a state with a de facto capital in Raqqah. This enabled it to launch a formidable assault on what would prove to be an irresolute and demoralised Iraqi army from a secure base across the Syrian-Iraqi border. The result was a devastating collapse in the military infrastructure of the Iraqi government with entire divisions throwing down their weapons and fleeing ISIS without a fight as happened in the Fall of Mosul.

== Allied progress ==
Despite recapturing both Baiji (only temporarily) and Amirli from ISIS, the Iraqi government was still struggling to drive out the militants who seized large swathes of the country in the face of the crumbling Iraqi Army. The most recent concerted effort is the Second Battle of Tikrit where the combined forces of the allies (with extensive military & intelligence support from Iran) are attempting to encircle the Jihadists in Tikrit by capturing Al-Dour and Al-Alam in the south and the north respectively, in order to cut them off and begin a siege against ISIS-occupied Tikrit. According to numerous sources the city of Al-Dour has already fallen and operation have commenced against Al-Alam in the north. ISIS has sent reinforcements to Tikrit from other parts of its self-proclaimed caliphate further north, where it came under attack on Monday from Kurdish forces around the oil-rich-city of Kirkuk.

The advance against ISIS however has been quite slow due to the extensive use of asymmetric tactics such as planting IEDs along routes of advance, the use of suicide bombers, tactically placed snipers etc. all of which has prompted the Iraqi officers to progress with particular caution against the enemy in order to minimise casualties as well as to guard against unnecessary civilian deaths as Isis fighters are said to be holding "an unspecified number of civilians as human shields" in Tikrit and other cities. An indication of the intensity and volume to which these tactics are being utilised by ISIS is given by the report mentioning over 382 IEDs by 11 of March. An Iraqi major general has been quoted as saying "We don't want to be rushed because we want to avoid casualties. Tikrit is sealed off from all sides."

At least 50 ISIS fighters have turned themselves into the allied forces' hands in the town of Al-Dour on 8 March. On the following day, 9 March, the town of al-Alam was captured by the allied forces and completely secured, in effect completing the encirclement of ISIS in Tikrit. On March 11, ISIL was driven from Tikrit hospital complex in the south of the city.

Despite ISIS' efforts to forestall the rapid advance of the allies on the east of the Tigris river by blowing up the bridge leading to the city over the Tigris, the allies managed to mount an aggressive push across the river and establish a bridgehead, subsequently advancing into Tikrit via the east. ISIS has been suffering heavy casualties, with reports of their dead littering the streets and with only 2,000 to 3,000 militants left to make a last stand in the city of Tikrit itself.

On 25 March, the allied forces were supposed to resume their offensive, as the American-led coalition launched its first airstrikes on ISIL targets in Tikrit. That night, US aircraft carried out 17 airstrikes in the center of Tikrit, which struck an ISIL building, two bridges, three checkpoints, two staging areas, two berms, a roadblock, and a command and control facility. As a result of the US entry into the battle, most of the Shi'ite militias present pulled out of the battle on 27 March, with the exception of the Badr Organisation.

On 31 March, the Iraqi security forces advanced into the city center, seizing the Salaheddin provincial government headquarters and the Tikrit hospital, as they moved towards the presidential complex. By On 2 April, the allied forces had secured nearly all of central Tikrit. where a few hundred ISIL fighters were still present.

On 4 April, Iraqi forces had recaptured most of Tikrit city; however, on 5 April, it was reported that 500 ISIL fighters were still holed up in the northern Qadisiya District, with resistance from the remaining ISIL fighters persisting for another week. On 12 April 2015, the Iraqi Government declared that Tikrit was free of ISIL forces, although continued resistance would persist until 17 April, when the last 130 ISIL sleeper agents in the city were killed. Cleanup and defusing operations in the city continued, but Iraqi officials predicted that it would take at least several months to remove the estimated 5,000–10,000 IEDs left behind by ISIL in Tikrit.

== Asymmetric blow-back ==
The continuing success of the allied forces (which are composed of mostly Shi'ite paramilitary groups, though they also contain a significant Sunni contingent), particularly in Sunni areas such as Tikrit, where ISIS has been losing a series of conventional battles, has prompted them to utilise more guerilla-like stratagems such as sending out coordinated teams of suicide-bombers to Baghdad, the capital and political nerve centre of the Iraqi government, in order to bring some pressure to bear on the allies. The strategic logic of these operations was explicated by an Iraq expert & security analyst Sajad Jiyad; "It's keeping the ISF on their toes. It's to let them know that they can strike anywhere, to force them to spread their forces thin. By letting off such a large series of explosions, it's sending a message that they are going to have to put their forces everywhere. It shows that ISIS can carry out these attacks at will and the ISF cannot relax its guard."

== See also ==
- Anbar campaign (2013–14)
- Fall of Mosul
- Operation Ashura
- Anbar offensive (2015)
- Military of ISIL
- Quds Force
- List of wars and battles involving ISIL
- Timeline of ISIL related events
