= Baiji (city) =

City in Salah ad Din, Iraq

Baiji بَيْجِي (Arabic)
- City
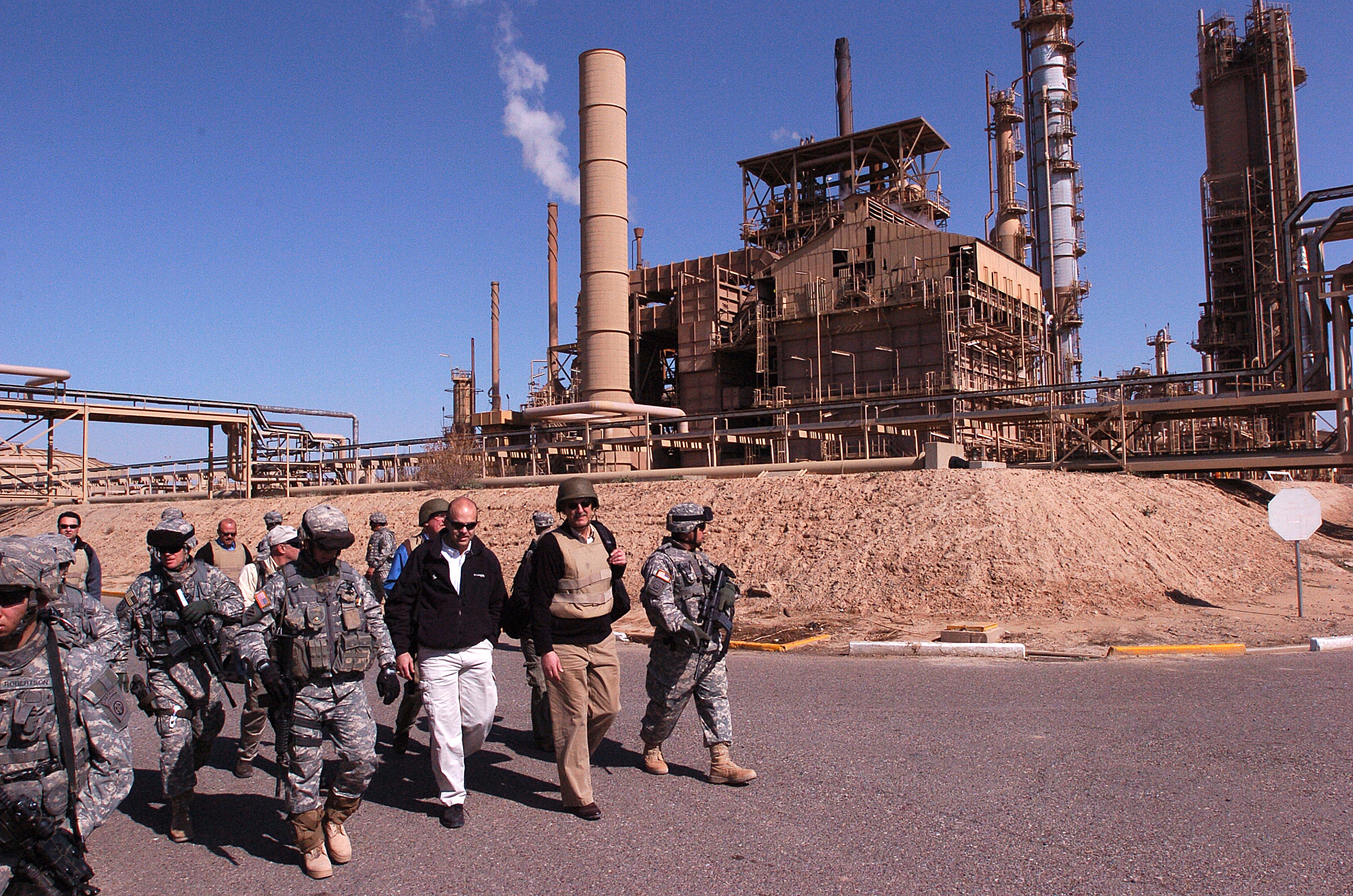
- Bayji Fertiliser Plant, February 2008
- Interactive map of Baiji
- Baiji's location inside Iraq
- Coordinates: 34°55′45″N 43°29′35″E
- Country: Iraq
- Governorate: Salah ad Din

Population (2014)
  - Total: 173,677
- Time zone: UTC+03:00 (AST)

Baiji (Arabic: بَيْجِي, romanized: Bayjī; also spelled Bayji) is a city of about 173,677 inhabitants in Salah ad Din governorate in northern Iraq. It is located some 130 miles (209 km) north of Baghdad, on the main road to Mosul. It is a major industrial centre best known for its oil refinery, the biggest in Iraq, and has a large power plant. With regard to transport in the area, Baiji is a junction of the national railway network.

== History ==
After the invasion of Kuwait in 1990, dozens of British civilians taken captive in Kuwait were held at the Baiji oil refinery, apparently as human shields. The city was bombed during the 1991 Gulf War and about 80% of the oil refinery was destroyed. It was quickly rebuilt and was back in action only a couple of months after the war's end. However, a lack of maintenance and spare parts resulting from the United Nations trade embargo against Iraq caused the deterioration of the city's oil refinery, which by the late 1990s was in a very poor condition and was seriously polluting the surrounding area.

=== Iraq War (2003–11) ===
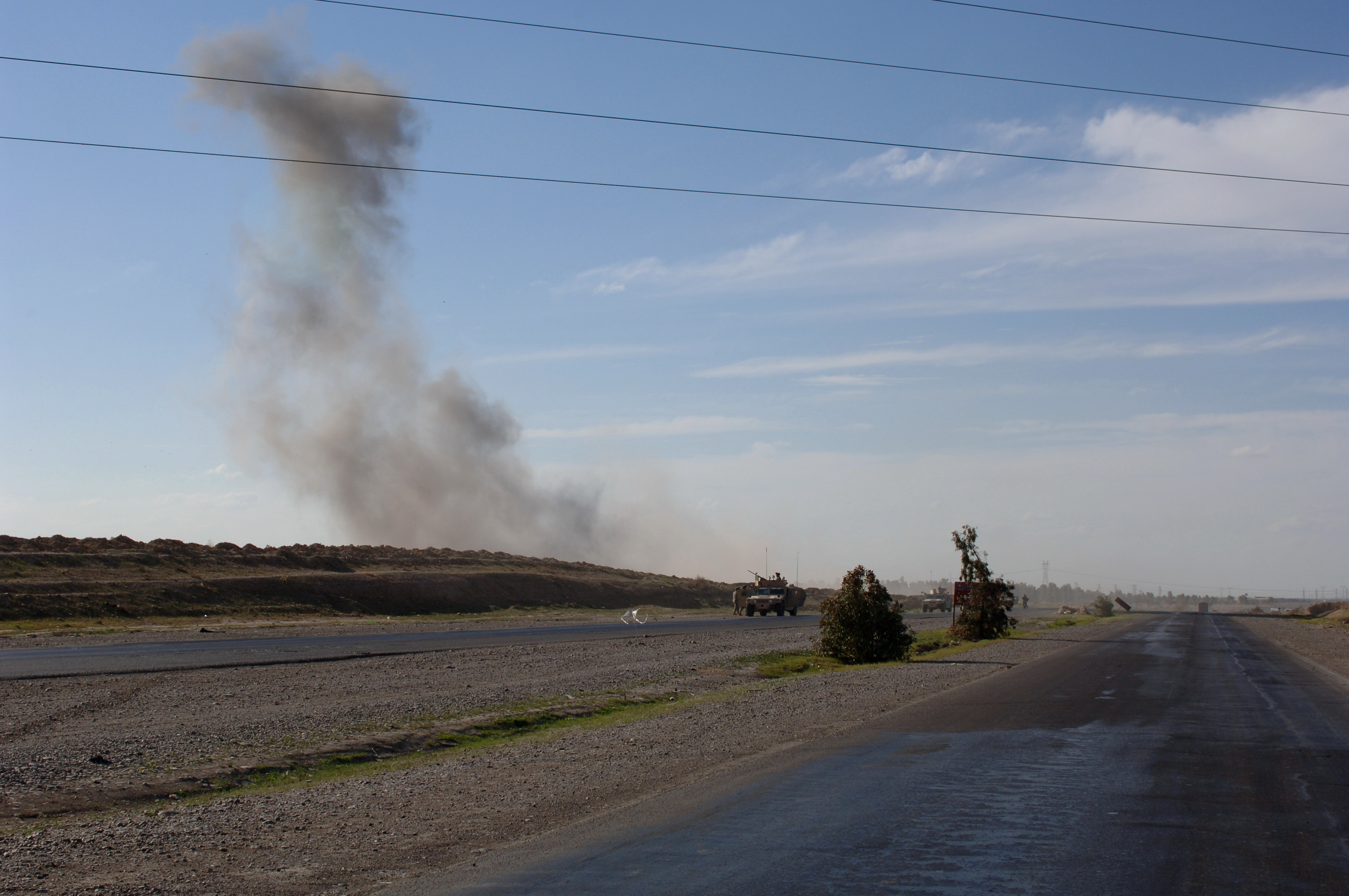
Smoke and dust mark the spot where a Humvee was damaged in an IED attack in Baiji, March 27, 2006

Baiji was captured with little or no fighting during the 2003 US invasion of Iraq. It was briefly thought in late April 2003 that barrels of chemicals found in a storage area near the town contained the nerve agent cyclosarin. Soon afterwards, United States troops discovered an underground oil refinery at Baiji which was initially suspected to be a chemical weapons plant. Both leads eventually proved to be false alarms in the search for Iraqi weapons of mass destruction.

Following the invasion, Baiji subsequently became the scene of a number of insurgent attacks. The town is at one end of the "Sunni Triangle" region which provided the bedrock of Saddam Hussein's support. The sprawling oil refinery and pipelines have been particularly difficult to protect against guerrillas. There have been repeated attacks on the oil pipelines and other elements of the oil infrastructure.

In October 2003, violent riots broke out in the town in protest against the US-backed police force, which was accused of corruption. US troops restored order, wounding four Iraqis in the process, and sacked the town's police chief, replacing him with a local man elected by tribal elders. A US soldier was killed in the town on October 12. US troops subsequently conducted a number of raids in the town to root out guerrillas, who were publicly supported by some of Baiji's clergy. It was also thought that Saddam Hussein might be hiding in Baiji, prompting raids to find him, before he was eventually captured in December 2003 in the nearby village of ad-Dawr.

In May 2007, a Joint Security Station (JSS) was established in Baiji named "JSS Arvanitis-Sigua" after two US Paratroopers who lost their lives in combat in Bayji.

In April 2009, the Joint Coordination Center (JCC) opened within the JSS. The function of the JCC is to enable the coordination of Iraqi municipal agencies thereby building the Government's capacity to provide essential services to the approximately 250,000 residents of the greater Baiji area.

=== 2014 ISIL offensive ===
On 11 June 2014, ISIL militants advanced into Baiji, seizing the main court house and police station and setting them on fire. The militants, who were travelling in a group of around 60 vehicles, also took control of the Baiji prison and freed all the inmates within. Local residents told members of the media that ISIL sent a group of local tribal chiefs ahead of them to convince the 250 guards at the oil plant to withdraw, while soldiers and police had been warned to leave as well. Later in the day, militants reportedly retreated from Baiji either due to persuasion from local tribal leaders or due to reinforcements from the Iraqi Army's Fourth Armored Division arriving in the city. However, the next day it was confirmed ISIL was still in control of the town, except the refinery which was surrounded.

On 18 June, ISIL attacked the refinery with mortars and machine guns. An official from inside the refinery stated the militants had captured 75 percent of the facility, while a military spokesman claimed the attack had been repelled with 40 insurgents being killed.

On 19 June, Iraqi government forces claimed to have regained full control of the Baiji oil refinery, after heavy fighting with that left 100 militants dead. An Iraqi witness who drove past the Baiji refinery told the Associated Press that ISIL had hung their banners from the watch towers and created checkpoints surrounding the facility, despite government claims of control.

On 20 June, the town was still under complete control of the militants while the oil refinery was surrounded by ISIL forces and had once again come under attack.

=== 2014 Army counteroffensive ===
On 7 November 2014, Iraqi forces retook control of most of the strategic city Baiji from the Islamic State. At the time, government troops reportedly held more than 70 percent of the city—including neighborhoods in the south, east and north—and were battling to capture the rest.

On 14 November 2014, Iraqi officials said their forces had driven out IS fighters from the oil refinery city of Baiji, 209 km (130 miles) north of Baghdad. Gen Abdul-Wahab al-Saadi told Iraqi state TV that the city "had been completely liberated".

Heavy fighting subsequently continued, and control of Baiji oscillated between both sides until 29 October 2015, when Iraqi government control of the city was fully restored, and the armed forces announced the complete liberation of the city.

== Geography ==
=== Climate ===
Baiji as a hot desert climate (Köppen climate classification BWh). Most rain falls in the winter. The average annual temperature in Baiji is 22.0 °C (71.6 °F). About 205 mm (8.07 in) of precipitation falls annually.

Climate data for Kut
| Month | Jan | Feb | Mar | Apr | May | Jun | Jul | Aug | Sep | Oct | Nov | Dec | Year |
|---|---|---|---|---|---|---|---|---|---|---|---|---|---|
| Mean daily maximum °C (°F) | 14.1 (57.4) | 16.9 (62.4) | 21.2 (70.2) | 27.2 (81.0) | 34.7 (94.5) | 40.4 (104.7) | 43.5 (110.3) | 43.2 (109.8) | 39.3 (102.7) | 32.5 (90.5) | 23.5 (74.3) | 16.3 (61.3) | 29.4 (84.9) |
| Daily mean °C (°F) | 9.0 (48.2) | 11.1 (52.0) | 14.9 (58.8) | 20.2 (68.4) | 26.6 (79.9) | 31.7 (89.1) | 34.6 (94.3) | 34.2 (93.6) | 30.1 (86.2) | 24.0 (75.2) | 16.6 (61.9) | 10.7 (51.3) | 22.0 (71.6) |
| Mean daily minimum °C (°F) | 4.0 (39.2) | 5.4 (41.7) | 8.6 (47.5) | 13.2 (55.8) | 18.6 (65.5) | 23.0 (73.4) | 25.8 (78.4) | 25.2 (77.4) | 21.0 (69.8) | 15.6 (60.1) | 9.8 (49.6) | 5.1 (41.2) | 14.6 (58.3) |
| Average precipitation mm (inches) | 36 (1.4) | 32 (1.3) | 36 (1.4) | 22 (0.9) | 7 (0.3) | 0 (0) | 0 (0) | 0 (0) | 0 (0) | 6 (0.2) | 28 (1.1) | 38 (1.5) | 205 (8.1) |
Source: climate-data.org

== See also ==
- Battle of Baiji (2014–15)
- List of places in Iraq
- Railway stations in Iraq
