= Amirli =

- Location within Iraq
- Coordinates: 34°43′30″N 44°35′15″E
- Country: Iraq
- Governorate: Saladin Governorate
- District: Tooz District

Population (2014)
  - Total: 15,000−20,000

Amirli (Arabic: آمرلي, romanized: ʾĀmirlī; Turkish: Amirli), also spelt Amerli, is a predominantly Shia Turkmen settlement in the Saladin Governorate, Iraq, approximately 100 km from the Iranian border. It is the centre of a farming region.

The town sits in a multi-ethnic region, with the town itself being mainly Shia Turkmen, and surrounded by Arab and Turkmen villages.

== History ==
=== 2007 bombing ===
On June 7, 2007, a bombing in the marketplace of Amirli, killed 165 people and injured 350.

=== 2014 siege by ISIS ===
The town, and its nearly 20,000 Shia Turkmen, was besieged by the ISIL starting in June 2014. It was running out of food, water, and supplies. A U.N. representative stated, "The situation of the people in Amerli is desperate and demands immediate action to prevent the possible massacre of its citizens." On August 31, the Popular Mobilization Forces, Iran, and local Turkmen tribes, managed to break the siege and entered the city, much to the rejoicing of its citizens.

== Climate ==
Amirli has a hot semi-arid climate (Köppen climate classification BSh). Most rain falls in the winter. The average annual temperature in Amirli is 21.3 °C (70.3 °F). About 301 mm (11.85 in) of precipitation falls annually.

Climate data for Amirli
Month	Jan	Feb	Mar	Apr	May	Jun	Jul	Aug	Sep	Oct	Nov	Dec	Year
Mean daily maximum °C (°F)	14.4 (57.9)	16.7 (62.1)	22.4 (72.3)	28.6 (83.5)	35.4 (95.7)	41.1 (106.0)	43.9 (111.0)	43.9 (111.0)	39.2 (102.6)	32.4 (90.3)	22.0 (71.6)	16.3 (61.3)	29.7 (85.4)
Mean daily minimum °C (°F)	4.7 (40.5)	6.0 (42.8)	10.0 (50.0)	15.3 (59.5)	21.4 (70.5)	26.6 (79.9)	29.6 (85.3)	29.4 (84.9)	24.9 (76.8)	19.7 (67.5)	11.1 (52.0)	6.5 (43.7)	17.1 (62.8)
Average precipitation mm (inches)	57 (2.2)	49 (1.9)	46 (1.8)	30 (1.2)	7 (0.3)	0 (0)	0 (0)	0 (0)	0 (0)	18 (0.7)	39 (1.5)	55 (2.2)	301 (11.9)
Source: Climate-Data.org, Climate data
