= Battle of Ramadi (2014–2015) =

Battle in 2014–15

Battle of Ramadi (2014-2015)
- Part of the War in Iraq
Date	21 November 2014 – 17 May 2015 (5 months, 3 weeks and 5 days)
Location	Ramadi, Anbar Governorate, Iraq 33.416°N 43.3°E
Result	ISIL victory: Iraqi government forces retreat from the city of Ramadi.; ISIL forces take full control of Ramadi and its outskirts.

Belligerents
Iraq Air support: United States; United Kingdom; Canada; Australia	Islamic State of Iraq and the Levant

Commanders and leaders
(Iraq) Haider al-Abadi (Iraq) Ahmed al-Dulaimi (Iraq) Maj. Gen. Fadhil Barwari (ICTS commander)	Abu Waheeb

Units involved
(Iraq) Iraqi Armed Forces: Shia militias; Tribal fighters; U.S. Air Force; Royal Air Force; Royal Canadian Air Force; Royal Australian Air Force	Military of ISIL

Strength
Iraqi Army: 6,000 (May 2015)	600–1,500

Casualties and losses
500–1,000 killed, 25+ missing	658+ killed
- 658+ people executed by ISIL in and around Ramadi (before 14 May); 500 civilians and security personnel killed (14–17 May)
- Ramadi's location inside Iraq

The Battle of Ramadi, also called the Fall of Ramadi, was part of an ISIL offensive to capture all of the Anbar Province. Ramadi was one of the Iraqi government's last strongholds in Anbar, after ISIL's success in a previous campaign. The battle began in November 2014, and drew to a close on 14 May 2015, as Islamic State of Iraq and the Levant (ISIL) insurgents seized hold of government buildings following heavy house to house urban fighting. On 17 May, the Iraqi Army and special forces fled the city, with 500 civilians and security personnel dead.

== Background ==
Ramadi is the capital of the Anbar Province and is one of the biggest cities in Iraq. It was partially conquered by ISIL and its allies when fighting erupted in the Anbar Province. Following a counterattack by government forces, the Iraqi government recaptured most of the city by February 2014, and all of it by March 2014. The claim was repeated again in May, in which the Anbar Police Chief said that "most" of the city was under their control.

However, ISIL returned, and reportedly had a presence in Ramadi by October 2014. On October 16, "Wilayat Anbar", ISIL's name for its faction in the Anbar Province, published a series of photos showing its presence in Ramadi. It was stated by Long War Journal that ISIL was in control of 60% of Ramadi, and that much of its southern districts and areas west and north of the city are contested or held by ISIL.

== Battle ==
=== ISIL attack and Iraqi government counterattack ===
The attack on Ramadi began after ISIL attacked the city from the east and from the west. They captured the village of Al Shujairiya, and fired at government buildings in the central part of the city. ISIL militants also pounded the city center with mortars, and used car bombs to try to weaken government forces in the area. Security forces and tribal fighters launched a counterattack, and stopped ISIL from advancing beyond their parts of the city. The Iraqis lost 20 soldiers and government forces called for reinforcements, while clashes continued in the city.

The next day, Iraqi government fighters launched an operation to retake lost ground. The operation focused on recapturing the Sijariya neighborhood seized on Friday. One government official said that heavy fighting was continuing in the city, with both sides firing mortars at each other.

Also, during an Iraqi government counter-offensive, they discovered 25 dead men on the eastern edge of Ramadi from the Albu Fahd tribe, killed by ISIL. A tribal leader, Sheikh Rafie al-Fahdawi, said that there were possibly more than 25. The Ramadi–Habbaniya road was under ISIL control, but government forces aided tribal fighters who were battling with tanks to secure the area.

Heavy fighting continued on November 23. Fierce battles took place between government forces and ISIL near the main government complex, which hosts the regional government and security headquarters. The battles were taking place about 1,000 feet away from the government complex. About 37 people were reported dead in the fighting, according to local authorities.

On November 24, ISIL was reportedly 150 m away from the city center, and government forces were reinforced with weapons from 5 planes that arrived in government-held areas of Ramadi. The heaviest fighting so far was occurring in downtown Ramadi, were the government complex was still held by Iraqi forces. ISIL seized the houses of Dulaimi tribe leaders, and used them as attack bases. One government official said ISIL had a presence "in the centre of Ramadi from the eastern side and have taken control of the al-Mu'allimin district and the Haouz area in the centre." Despite reported setbacks, Iraqi forces said the momentum was shifting in the favor of government forces. Iraqi forces, with the help the coalition airstrikes, managed to push back ISIL fighters in the city and take back a key military supply line. However, clashes continued in the eastern suburbs.

On November 25, ISIL published a series of photos through Twitter that showed the fighting in Ramadi. Some showed that ISIL captured M113 armored personnel carriers, and used them to attack Iraqi forces and tribal fighters.

On November 26, Iraqi forces said they repelled an ISIL offensive on the government complex, and also that the militants suffered heavy losses. Iraqi forces, supported by tribal fighters and airstrikes, repelled other attacks as well. Setbacks were also reported for government forces, because during the night before, ISIL seized the Education Directorate and were less than 20 meters away from the complex. The Anbar Provincial Council issued a statement saying that the city could fall to ISIL within the next 24 hours. Col. Hamid Shandukh said that government forces were defending the compound, and the Governor of the Anbar Province said that "If we lose Anbar, that means we will lose Iraq. I will very soon be with the tribes and the security forces in Anbar to fight".

=== Continued ISIL assaults on Ramadi ===
Heavy fighting continued on November 29, mainly in the al-Hoz, Muallimin, and Bakr districts. A police major said that clashes had been going on for hours, and tribal leaders said they retook entrances that led to the al-Hoz district. They also said that if military airstrikes continued, then they may able to take complete control of Ramadi.

On December 2, Iraqi Security forces continued to repel attacks by ISIL forces on Ramadi. The attacks began when ISIL fighters tried to storm the city from three fronts, but tribal fighters in the northwestern Abu Risha fought back and repelled the assault. The clashes killed 10 ISIL militants and 2 Iraqi soldiers. Iraqi forces had prevented ISIL from reaching the government complex, as a result of airstrikes and increased security. However, Iraqi officials said that coalition airstrikes around the city had stopped. Despite that, the US said they hit an ISIL column near Ramadi, destroying a vehicle and a tactical unit.

On December 8, the Iraqi Army claimed they made major advances in the Anbar Province, and claimed that they killed 300 ISIL fighters in Ramadi. Advances were reportedly made in the Huz and Sajariyah districts. This was confirmed by the police chief of the Anbar Province, saying that coalition airstrikes destroyed many vehicles captured by ISIL.

On December 9, the Albu Nimr tribe said it could only fight ISIL for 5 more days, because they were running low on ammunition and weapons. A tribal leader said that the Iraqi government should be supplying the tribesmen, and not the US. Sporadic fighting continued, and an Iraqi lawmaker warned that ISIL was assembling a large number of fighters for an all-out attack on Ramadi, after a major assault on the government complex the day before. He said that clashes were still continuing, despite the fact the attack was repelled.

On December 10, the humanitarian situation in the Anbar Province was described as "critical." ISIL launched another unsuccessful assault on the government complex, and 15 ISIL fighters were killed. This led to fears that Ramadi would fall to ISIL soon, due to the lack of ammunition and support. An Australian national fighting for ISIL was reportedly killed as a result of the fighting in Ramadi's southern districts.

=== ISIL offensive ===
On December 11, fierce clashes took place around Ramadi. In rural areas, a booby-trapped vehicle was detonated, close to the 6th Brigade Base. Many security forces were killed by the blast, and an ISIL assault followed. Brigadier Ihsan Ahmed was killed in a battle with ISIL forces, and the group were on two sides of the base. Elsewhere in Ramadi, ISIL tried to advance into the Hawz district, but security forces engaged them in an attempt to halt their advance. They partially repelled the attack, but ISIL captured some parts of the district. The following day, an Iraqi government attempt to recapture the town of Hīt, a major town near Ramadi, failed. ISIL responded with a major counterattack in which ISIL made gains in areas west of Ramadi.

On December 12, a patrol of RAF Tornado GR4's provided aerial support to Iraqi soldiers engaged in a firefight with ISIL militants near Ramadi, destroying several ISIL firing positions and three ISIL vehicles, including two armoured personnel carriers.

The same day, ISIL captured 15 villages in the Anbar Province, according to Sheikh Naeem al-Ku'oud, one of Anbar's tribal leaders who said ISIL recaptured these villages, after they were previously liberated by the Western province's tribesmen. 35 members of Albu Nimr tribe were captured by ISIL after battles against the radical militant group in al-Mahboubiya near Hīt. On December 13, ISIL fighters stormed the town, killing at least 19 policemen and trapping others inside their headquarters. ISIL then proceeded to capture the town of al-Wafa, after starting its assault early on Friday. Iraqi forces tried to defend it, but the lack of ammunition forced them to retreat and give up control of the town. Police forces, backed by few members of government-paid Sunni tribal fighters, tried to prevent the militants from crossing the sand barrier surrounding the town, but were overwhelmed when sleeper cells from inside opened fire on them, according to officials. With the town's fall, ISIL controlled three major towns to the west of Ramadi, including Hīt and Kubaisa. Police forces and the pro-government Sunni fighters were forced to retreat to a nearby police-brigade headquarters bordering their town. The remaining fighters holed in there said that they were surrounded by ISIL. Elsewhere in the province, ISIL militants executed at least 21 Sunni tribal fighters on Friday after capturing them near al-Baghdadi town on Wednesday, local officials and tribesmen said on Saturday.

=== Fighting continues ===
On December 16, ISIL launched another attack on the Ramadi city center. Security forces armed with mortars and assault rifles repelled the attack with the help of Sunni Tribes. Government forces also used adapted Humvees against ISIL in the attack.

US servicemen training Iraqi forces against ISIL were reportedly involved in a clash with ISIL forces near Ramadi on December 17, 2014. ISIL forces reportedly came near the base in an attempt to capture it, but this caused US servicemen to open fire. With the support of an FA-18, ISIL was forced to withdraw. Progress was reportedly being made in the Al-Dolab area, 90 kilometers west of Ramadi. A hospital in Ramadi said that it received the bodies of many small children after they were killed by ISIL, while trying to escape from Al-Wafa. ISIL gunmen besieged a group of the Albu Nimr tribe near Lake Tharthar, and they were relying on plants growing near the lake to survive.

On January 9, 2015, in support of ground units, two RCAF CF-18 Hornets successfully struck an ISIL transport truck carrying an armored personnel carrier near Ramadi.

On January 21, Iraqi forces foiled an ISIL attack on Ramadi. Government forces, helped by tribesmen and coalition air support, repelled the attack on the city center. ISIL reportedly lost 48 fighters and 17 were arrested, and dozens of vehicles were also seized from ISIL.

On January 26, Iraqi forces launched a major operation to retake areas of Ramadi not under government control. According to Faleh Al-Issawi, deputy chief of the Anbar Council, said that the operation would focus on clearing the east-central areas. Iraqi government forces also announced a temporary curfew in the city to try to "cleanse" the city from ISIL fighters.

On March 11, the Islamic State launched a major assault on Ramadi in Iraqi government-held areas. At 7:00 AM local time, ISIL launched the assault by sending suicide bombers to try to attack government forces. The car bombs killed 10 people and wounded 30, but Iraqi government forces repelled the attack by shooting at the trucks before they could detonate their explosives.

On April 5, RAF Tornado GR4's provided air support to Iraqi military units near Ramadi which had come under fire from ISIL. A successful attack was conducted on the building using a Paveway IV laser-guided bomb.

=== Iraqi Army offensive ===
On April 8, Iraqi government forces began an offensive to capture the nearby Al-Karmah district from ISIL. As a result, ISIL executed 300 people in the western Anbar Province. It was also reported that 10,000 Sunni tribal fighters would participate in the Anbar offensive. On the same day, Iraqi government forces began an offensive in the Sijariya area east of Ramadi, in order to secure supply routes to the nearby Habbaniyah Air Base, and to weaken the jihadists' grip on territory connecting Ramadi and Falluja. It was reported that ISIL forces were retreating from Sijariya.

On 9 April, Coalition airstrikes killed 13 ISIL militants in western Ramadi.

On 12 April, ISIL executed 35 Al-Bofarj clan members in Ramadi.

On 30 April, it was reported that the citizens in Ramadi were suffering a gas and oil shortage, after ISIL had captured the Ramadi Gas Plant to the east of Ramadi.

=== Fall of Ramadi ===
On 14 May 2015, ISIL launched an assault on the city named as Battle of Abu Muhannad As-Sweidāwi using armored bulldozers and the use of 10 suicide bombers (driving captured Humvees packed with explosives) to burst through the main gate, resulting in the capture of the police headquarters, government buildings and the Ramadi Great Mosque. On 15 May, an RAF Reaper among other coalition aircraft that came to the assistance of the Iraqi security forces and it was able to destroy a terrorist position with a Hellfire missile. On 16 May, Iraqi officials claimed that ISIL militants withdrew from the main government building in the Iraqi city of Ramadi after air strikes by the US-led coalition. Despite official claims, ISIL still appeared to be advancing, unhindered by US-led Coalition airstrikes, and ultimately consolidated full control over the last government-controlled neighborhood of "Mal'ab", south of Ramadi on 17 May.

On 17 May, Ramadi fell completely to the ISIL insurgents, with the Iraqi Army, Iraqi special forces and Iraqi Government officials fleeing the city escorted by tanks, with a total of 500 civilians and security personnel reported dead.

According to a report by current and former American officials, ISIL fighters used a sandstorm to help seize a critical military advantage during the early hours of the terrorist group's attack on Ramadi. The sandstorm delayed American warplanes and kept them from launching airstrikes to help the Iraqi forces, helping to set in motion an assault that forced Iraqi security forces to flee. ISIL fighters used the time to carry out a series of car bombings, followed by a wave of ground attacks in and around the city that eventually overwhelmed the Iraqi forces. Once the storm subsided, ISIL and Iraqi forces were intermingled in heavy combat in many areas, making it difficult for allied pilots to distinguish between ISIL and pro-government fighters, the officials said. By that point, the militants had gained an operational momentum that could not be reversed.

=== Further ISIL attempts to advance and criticism ===
The Iraqi government appealed to the Shia militias for aid in recapturing the city. About 3,000 Shia militia amassed near the city by 19 May and were on standby at the Habbaniyah military camp, 20 kilometres (12 mi) away from the city. ISIL prepared to defend Ramadi by setting up defensive positions and landmines. The pro-government forces thwarted an attack by ISIL overnight to the east of Ramadi where the Shia militiamen were stationed. The Iraqi cabinet also issued a call for volunteers to fight against ISIL and retake the city. On 22 May, ISIL captured Husaybah, to the east of Ramadi. The following day, Iraqi government forces launched a counterattack, and reportedly recaptured the Husaybah's police station and retook the town from ISIL control.

On 24 May, United States Secretary of Defence Ashton Carter criticised the Iraqi forces, saying that they showed no will to fight against ISIL during the battle and withdrew, despite outnumbering them. His comments were dismissed as baseless by Hakim al-Zamili, a senior Iraqi MP who blamed the failure of the battle on the US military for not providing the Iraqi army with proper equipment, weapons and aerial support. Some U.S. intelligence and military officials said on the condition of anonymity, that the U.S. had significant intelligence about the pending Islamic State offensive in Ramadi. But the U.S. did not order airstrikes against the ISIL convoys before the battle started. It left the fighting to Iraqi troops, who were ultimately forced to abandon their positions after being overwhelmed against the ISIL attack. The next day, a spokesman for Haider al-Abadi, the Prime Minister of Iraq said that Carter had been given "incorrect information" following his criticism of its security forces over the fall of Ramadi. Saad al-Hadithi, a spokesman for al-Abadi, said his government was surprised by Carter's comments and the whole army should not be judged based on one incident. He also said that the Iraqi government believed the fall of Ramadi was due to mismanagement and poor planning by some senior military commanders in charge. General Qasem Soleimani, the head of the elite Quds Force in Iran's Revolutionary Guard Corps blamed the fall of Ramadi on the US military for its lack of will to fight against the ISIL and support the Iraqi troops against ISIL. On the same day, Iraqi government vowed to retake Ramadi within days. Joe Biden assured the Iraqi forces of full support against the ISIL. He also praised the Iraqi troops for fighting against the ISIL in Ramadi and elsewhere. On 18 June 2015, British army's brigadier Christopher Ghiks blamed the loss of Ramadi on the Anbar Operations commander who ordered an unnecessary withdrawal from the city. Staff Major Gen Mohammed Khalaf al-Fahdawi who was the acting head of Anbar Operations Command as the commander had been injured said he could not comment because he did not have permission to speak about the issue. On June 27 in a televised address, the Iraqi Prime Minister criticised his troops saying they made an unauthorised withdrawal from the city and had they resisted instead of withdrawing, the city would not have been lost. On August 16, 2015, he ordered all of the commanders who abandoned their positions to face a court martial.

== Aftermath ==
On 26 May 2015, pro-government forces in Iraq formally launched an operation to drive Islamic State out of Anbar province. The announcement was made by a spokesman for the Popular Mobilisation. He said the operation would see government troops and militiamen move southwards from Salahuddin province and seek to cut off ISIL militants in Ramadi. Fighting was reported to the south and west of Ramadi as Iraqi government forces tried to cut off supply routes to Ramadi and retook the Al-Taesh area. French Foreign Minister Laurent Fabius criticised that the Shiite militias were leading the fight and said that Iraq needed to do more to hold up its deal of creating a more inclusive government, which was France's precondition for joining the airstrike campaign. On 27 May 2015, pro-government forces took position on the outskirts of the city. They defeated ISIL militants in al-Ankur, a few kilometers south of Ramadi and entered the University of Anbar to take back control of the university compound. ISIL continued to fortify berms and lay booby traps and roadside bombs. The militants were able to bring supplies into Ramadi through some routes from the west since the Iraqi forces were largely at the east and south of the city. By 28 May 2015, parts of the university were retaken by government forces. The Popular Front claimed that they had captured more than 200 ISIL fighters, however according to local tribesmen and tribe leaders only 20 to 25 of them were ISIL fighters and the rest were actually fishermen and farmers. Iraqi forces later had to pull back from the university.

On 30 May 2015, Iraqi forces retook an area west of Ramadi as they pressed their operation aimed at sealing off the ISIL fighters in the city. The Iraqi army and the Hashed al-Shaabi retook the Anbar traffic police building in the 5K area west of Ramadi after a fight with ISIL. The battle forced ISIL to withdraw from the building, which they had used as a base and pull back into the city. The security forces tightened their stranglehold on Ramadi, from the traffic police building to the west, from the university to the south and from the other sides too. Ordnance disposal teams were removing roadside bombs and checking buildings for booby traps in reconquered positions on the outskirts of Ramadi. On 2 June 2015, ISIL closed the gates of Ramadi Barrage to lower the water level, reducing the amount of water supply to pro-government towns and making moving across the river, while targeting pro-government forces, easier for their fighters.

On July 12, the United States-led coalition launched 29 airstrikes on ISIL targets near Ramadi. They struck 67 ISIL staging areas and destroyed the militant group's vehicles and equipment, which were two excavators, one armoured personnel carrier, and a vehicle.

== U.S. support ==
On November 22, 2014, the Pentagon said that it planned to arm Iraqi tribesmen fighting ISIL. Such equipment included AK-47 assault rifles, rocket propelled grenades, and mortar rounds. The plan costs a total of $24 million, and is part of a broader plan to arm Kurdish fighters as well. On the same day, the Iraqi Prime Minister ordered more air support and weapons to tribal fighters combating ISIL.

After the capture of the city by ISIL, the US National Security Council said it was considering how best to support local ground forces. Spokesman Alistair Baskey told AFP that some of the measures might include accelerating the training and equipping of local tribes and supporting an Iraqi-led operation to retake Ramadi. On 20 May 2015, the US government announced that it would provide the Iraqi forces with 1,000 AT-4 systems especially in order to be able to combat against massive suicide car bombings by ISIL like the ones in Ramadi. The following day, it was announced that the United States would deliver 2,000 AT-4 anti-tank rockets to Iraq as early as the following week, 1,000 more than announced earlier, to help Iraqi forces combat suicide car bombings by ISIL.

== See also ==
- Military intervention against ISIL
  - American-led intervention in Syria
- Fall of Mosul
- First Battle of Tikrit
- Siege of Amirli
- Sinjar massacre
- Siege of Kobanî
- Fall of Hīt (2014)
- Derna Campaign (2014–2015)
- Battle of Baiji (October–December 2014)
- Battle of Baiji (2014–2015)
- December 2014 Sinjar offensive
- Mosul offensive (2015)
- Second Battle of Tikrit (March–April 2015)
- Al-Hawl offensive
- November 2015 Sinjar offensive
- Siege of Fallujah
- Tishrin Dam offensive
- List of wars and battles involving ISIL
