= Baiji oil refinery =

Largest oil refinery in Iraq

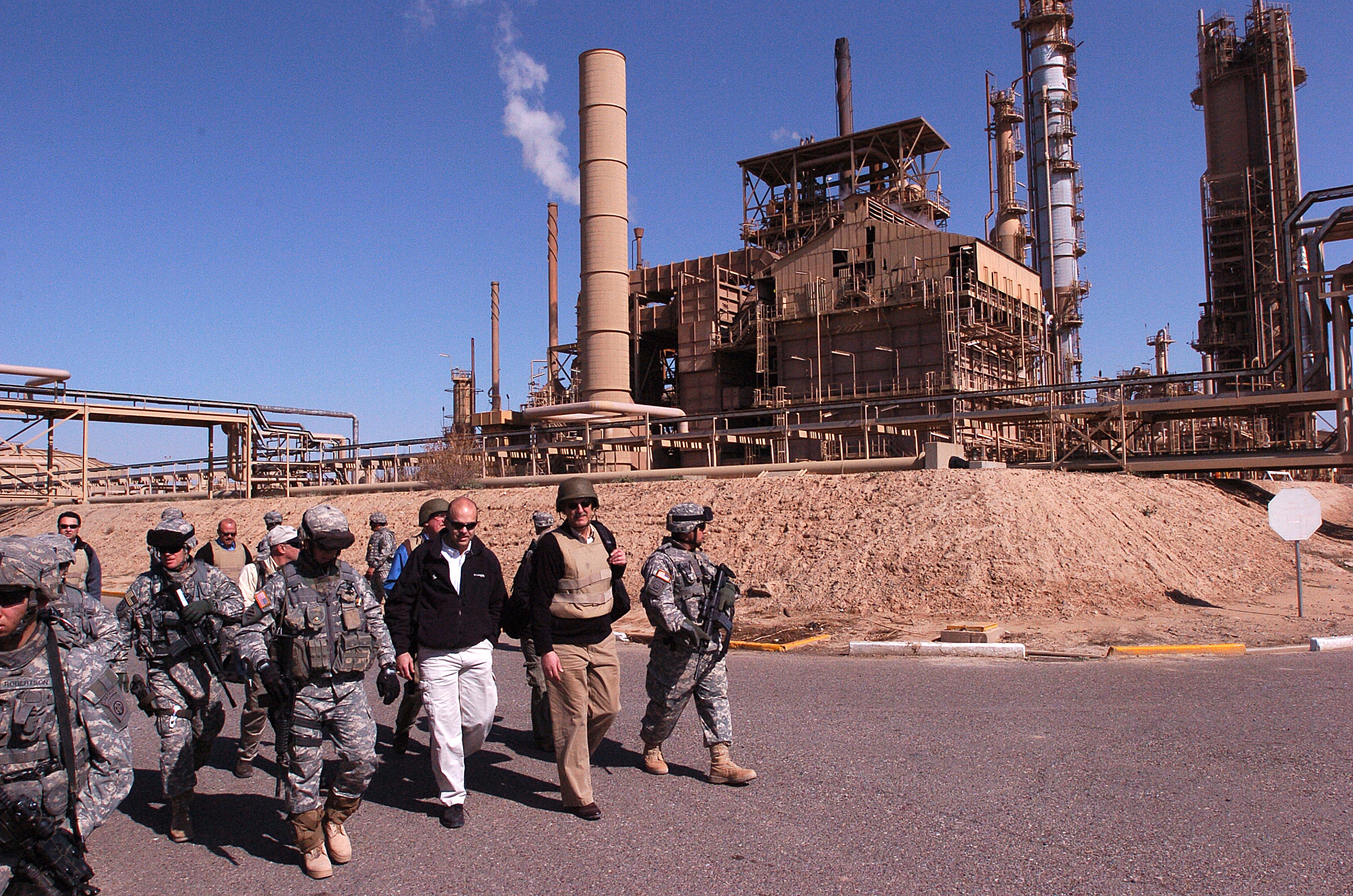
- Baiji oil refinery, 2008
- Interactive map of Baiji oil refinery
- Location: Baiji, Iraq; 35.008°N 43.500°E

Refinery details
- Capacity: 310,000 barrels per day (49,000 m^{3}/d)

The Baiji oil refinery is the largest oil refinery in Iraq and produces a third of the country's oil output. The refinery is 130 miles north of Baghdad, about halfway between Baghdad and Mosul, near the city of Baiji. In 2008, 500 tanker trucks filled with fuel used to leave the refinery per day. It was the scene of intense fighting between the Islamic State and the Iraqi government in 2014 and 2015.

== Capture by ISIS ==
The refinery was captured by ISIS militants on 24 June 2014 after 10 days of heavy fighting. The refinery was taken back by Iraqi forces and Shia militias, known as the Popular Mobilization Forces, fighting alongside them on 16 October 2015, after it had changed hands repeatedly. It had received so much damage during the fighting that it would take years to have it operational again.

== Reopening in 2024 ==
Following the damages suffered in 2014/15, extensive works allowed to reconstruct and reopen the refinery in February 2024 following a decade-long shutdown.
