= Iraqi Counter Terrorism Service =

Elite special forces and counter-terrorism unit of the Iraqi Armed Forces

Counter Terrorism Service Iraqi Special Operations Forces CTS-ISOF
- جهاز مكافحة الإرهاب قوات العمليات الخاصة العراقية
- Emblem of the Counter Terrorism Bureau
- Founded: April 2007 (CTS established)
- Country: Iraq
- Type: Special operations force
- Role: Counterterrorism; Hostage rescue; Special operations; Special Reconnaissance; Anti-corruption
- Size: Classified
- Part of: Iraqi Armed Forces (Note: Reports directly to Prime Minister of Iraq)
- Garrison/HQ: Green Zone, Baghdad
- Nickname: The Golden Division
- Motto: "Raise The Black"
- Colors: Black
- Engagements: Iraqi insurgency (2003–2011); War against the Islamic State; 2017 Iraqi–Kurdish conflict; Syrian Civil War; Iraqi insurgency (2017–present); Twelve-Day War; Operation Dawn

Commanders
- Commander-in-chief: Ali al-Zaidi
- Director of CTS: Lt. Gen. Zaid Hoshi al-Musawi
- Commander of CTC: Maj. Gen. Alaa Yassir
- Notable commanders: Talib Shaghati; Abdul-Wahab al-Saadi; Abdul-Ghani al-Asadi

Insignia
- ICTB Flag

- ISOF Flag

The Counter Terrorism Service (CTS; Arabic: جهاز مكافحة الارهاب) is an Iraqi security and intelligence agency tasked with counterterrorism. It is separate from the Ministry of Defence and Ministry of Interior, and is at times described as a quasi-ministerial organisation.

It has a two-tiered organizational structure which consists of the CTS headquarters and the Counter Terrorism Command (CTC). The latter commands the Iraqi Special Operations Forces (ISOF; Arabic: قوات العمليات الخاصة العراقية), currently consisting of three brigades based in several governorates. They are often collectively referred to as the Golden Division. They are part of the Iraqi Armed Forces and report directly to the Prime Minister of Iraq.

CTS was created in 2007 and is funded by the Ministry of Defence. The Service played a crucial role in combatting terrorism during the war against the Islamic State. ISOF have conducted joint operations with USSOF units such as the Green Berets and Delta Force.

Members of the Special Operation Forces conduct sniper rifle training at Area VI training site in Baghdad, Jan. 7, 2016.

== History ==
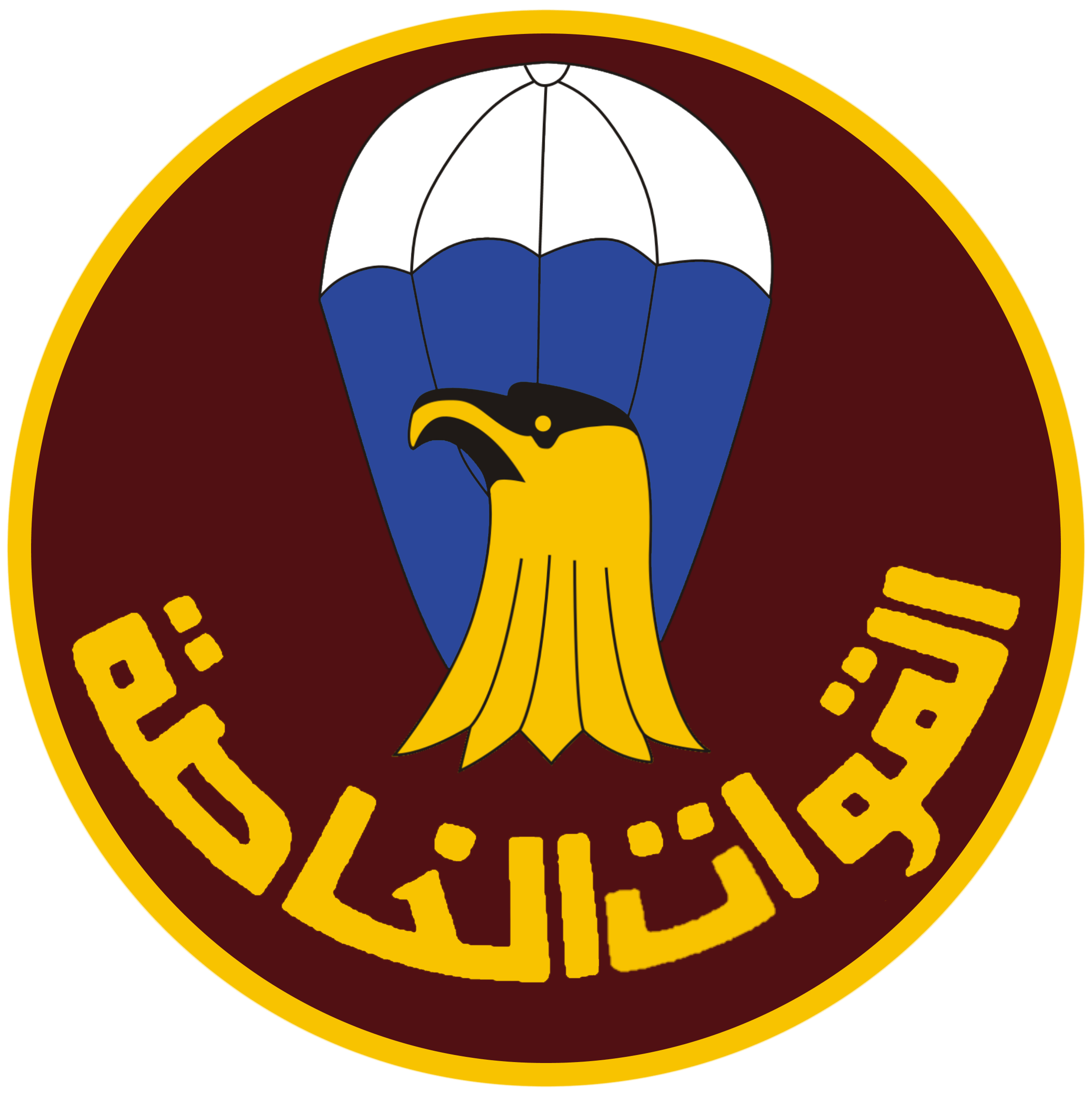
Official Iraqi Army Special Forces logo from 1980 to 2003. Currently serves as the official logo of the 2nd Battalion of ISOF-1.

Special forces of the Iraqi Army were first established when Colonel Khalil Dabbagh built the first royal special units in the name of "Queen Alia Forces" in the mid-1950s. It consisted of Sunni and Shia Arabs, as well as other components of the Iraqi population. They were mainly used on an emergency basis to carry out special missions inside of Iraq and outside when the country was at war.

The 65th Special Forces Brigade, 76th Special Forces Brigade, 78th Special Forces Brigade, and 450th Marine Brigade were active during the Gulf War.

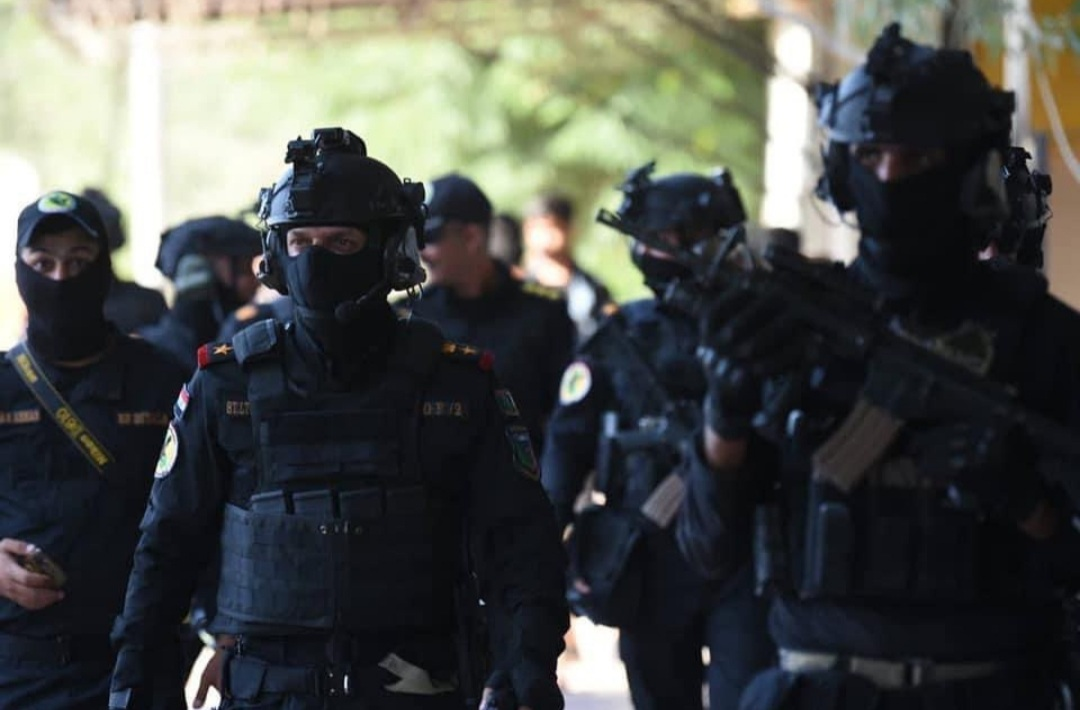
Counter-Terrorism Service units during a mission in 2021

During the occupation of Iraq, all military, security, and intelligence entities of the country were dissolved by the Coalition Provisional Authority following the issuance of CPA Order 2, and rebuilt from scratch.

In late 2003, the 36th Commando Battalion was recruited from scratch, mostly from Arabs (Shias and Sunnis), but also Kurds, Assyrians and Turkmen. Another, more clandestine battalion named the Iraqi Counter Terrorism Force (ICTF), with robust intelligence capabilities and specialised in counterterrorism and hostage rescue, was also formed at the same time. ICTF assumed the central role as the 36th commando battalion was placed in a supporting role to it, with the aim that a premier counterinsurgency force would eventually be developed around the two battalions. The first Iraqi Special Operations Forces brigade (ISOF-1) was formed by the Iraqi Army with the help of U.S. special operations forces in July 2005. In November 2005, after training in Jordan with Jordanian Special Forces and U.S. Army Special Forces ("Green Berets"), the Iraqi Special Operations Force had 1,440 men trained, composed of two combat battalions, considered equal in training and combat effectiveness to an average U.S. Army infantry battalion, and two support battalions.

In April 2007, the Counter Terrorism Service (CTS) was established with ISOF as its operational arm, and by March 2008, it consisted of a single brigade which in turn was made up of Iraqi Counter-Terrorism Force (ICTF) battalion, three commando battalions, a support battalion and a special reconnaissance unit.

In December 2007, the ICTS had an authorized strength of around 4,100 personnel but was only manned at about 3,500.

The 2nd Special Operations Forces brigade (ISOF-2) was formed in July 2009.

By mid 2010, the 1st ISOF Brigade had 2,793 personnel, and the 2nd ISOF Brigade had 1,633 personnel. A few hundred personnel from other units were transferred to help easy manpower pressures. On April 18, 2010, ISOF troops, supported by U.S. troops, carried out a night-time raid on a terrorist safe house near Tikrit. The ISOF surrounded the building and called on them to surrender, but instead the terrorists fired on them. The ISOF returned fire and assaulted the building. The ISOF killed Abu Ayyub al-Masri and Abu Omar al-Baghdadi, the leaders of the Islamic State of Iraq, 16 others were also arrested.

After the U.S. left in 2011, the CTS struggled without American intelligence, air strikes, logistical capabilities, and medical care. Journalist/researcher Michael R. Gordon was told that with the withdrawal of the U.S. Army and Air Force, and the fraying of Iraqi capabilities, Maliki had saddled the CTS "with a burgeoning array of missions that included manning checkpoints, escorting convoys, protecting voting centres, and doing battle with militants in densely populated Iraqi cities. A specialised force that had been designed to carry out lightning raids against terrorist cells (with considerable [U.S.] support) had become a jack-of-all-trades that was being tasked to deal with the upheaval in Iraq."

The 3rd Special Operations Forces brigade (ISOF-3) was formed in spring 2013.

In 2014, Iraq re-invited the United States, this time in order to assist the country in its fight against the Islamic State. Following the return of the United States forces and the subsequent establishment of the anti-ISIS Combined Joint Task Force – Operation Inherent Resolve, ISOF began a new partnership with USSOF.

In the Battle of Mosul that began in October 2016, ISOF were the first division into the city of Mosul, which had been occupied by Islamic State since 2014. After the fall of Mosul, the ISOF battalions increasingly took up an infantry role the Iraqi army and militias were not able to provide during operations, a role the unit was unfamiliar with for most of the war against terror. This resulted in a greater number of casualties than in previous operations, which were smaller in scale and shorter in duration.

On 1 November 2016, the 1st Iraqi Special Forces Brigade fought its way into the Gogjali quarter of the city, becoming the first Iraqi unit to enter the city during the offensive. On 10 July 2017, the Iraqi prime minister declared the liberation of Mosul from ISIS. By the end of the battle, CTS forces suffered a 40 percent casualty rate.

CTS force strength fluctuated sharply due to losses and replacements: roughly 13,000 before the ISIS offensive, down to about 6,500 by early 2015, then rebuilt to around 10,000–11,000 by the start of the Mosul battle and afterward.

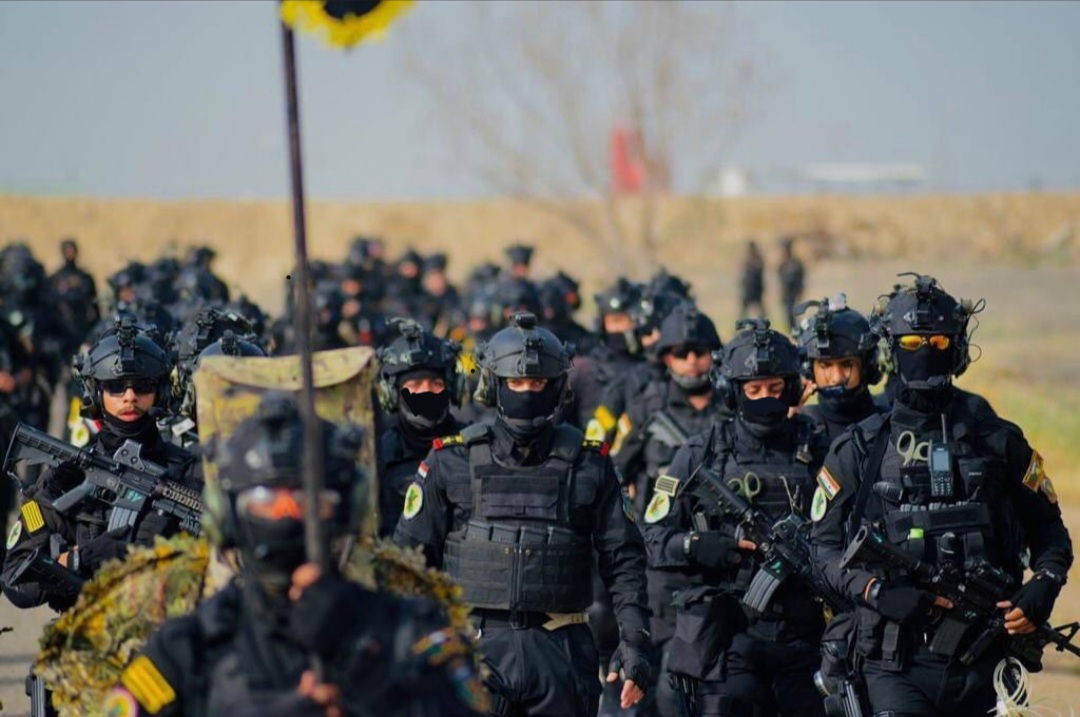
ISOF during training in Babylon, 2020

During its fight against ISIS in 2014–2017, ISOF gained valuable experience and has since undertaken "industrial scale" counterterrorism operations in Iraq while maintaining a sustained operational tempo unmatched by any other special operations force in the world.

== Command structure ==
Iraqi Special Operations Forces conducting night missions near Amarah.

CTS and CTC leadership consists of Iraqi army generals while exercising significant administrative and operational autonomy and having a chain of command separate from that of the regular army. ISOF are organized into three primary brigades, each responsible for operations in different regions of Iraq. The structure includes specialized battalions for commando, support, reconnaissance, and tactical operations. A commando battalion has around 400 personnel, while a STU battalion has around 300, due to its more specialized role.

Overall ISOF consist of sixteen commando battalions, two special tactics unit (STU) battalions, three reconnaissance battalions, and three support battalions.

- 1st Special Operations Brigade (ISOF-1)
  - Iraqi Counter-Terrorism Force (ICTF)
  - 1st Battalion (Commando) – Former 36th Battalion
  - 2nd Battalion (Support)
  - 3rd Battalion (Reconnaissance)
  - 1st Special Tactics Unit (STU) Battalion
  - 2nd Special Tactics Unit (STU) Battalion
  - Anbar Battalion
  - Babel Battalion

The first brigade is based in Baghdad but conducts nationwide operations. They were previously referred to as the Golden Brigade. Its current commander is Maj. Gen. Nizar Muzhir.

- 2nd Special Operations Brigade (ISOF-2)
  - Reconnaissance Battalion
  - Mosul Battalion Battalion
  - Kirkuk Battalion
  - Diyala Battalion
  - Salah ad-Din Battalion
  - Wasit Battalion
  - Support Battalion

The second brigade operates in Nineveh, Saladin, Kirkuk, Diyala, Anbar and Karbala. Its current commander is Maj. Gen. Marwan Abdulkarim.

- 3rd Special Operations Brigade (ISOF-3)
  - Reconnaissance Battalion
  - Basra Battalion
  - Diwaniya Battalion
  - Maysan Battalion
  - Najaf Battalion
  - Muthanna Battalion
  - Dhi Qar Battalion
  - Support Battalion

The third brigade operates in Basra, Babylon, Najaf, Maysan, Dhi Qar, Muthanna and Qadisiyah. Additionally, the brigade maintains a reconnaissance battalion, a support battalion, and a STU, as well as a hostage rescue and maritime piracy response battalion. Its current commander is Brig. Gen. Muntadhar Salim.

- Academia
  - 1st School (Special Operations)
  - 2nd School (Counter Terrorism)
  - 3rd School (Prep & Development)

Formerly the 4th Battalion of the 1st ISOF Brigade, developed into an institute responsible for screening and training new recruits for the CTC. Located in Baghdad, its current head is Maj. Gen. Arkan Jalal.

== Equipment ==
=== Handguns ===
- Beretta 92FS pistol
- Tariq pistol
- S&W M&P9 pistol
- Glock 17 & Glock 19
- HS2000 pistol

=== Assault rifles and battle rifles ===
- M4A1 carbine
- M16A2/M16A4
- Remington R4
- Rock River Arms LAR-15
- SIG Sauer SIGM400
- VHS-K2/D2 bullpup assault rifle
- K2C carbine
- OTs-14 Groza

=== Submachine guns ===
- H&K MP5

=== Shotguns ===
- Mossberg 500
- Benelli M4

=== Sniper rifles and anti material rifles ===
- HSR Cyclone sniper rifle
- Steyr HS .50/AM50 anti-material rifle
- M24 SWS
- ORSIS T-5000 sniper rifle
- Barrett M82A1/M107 SASR
- K14 sniper rifle
- Mk 14 Enhanced Battle Rifle

=== Machine guns ===
- PKM
- M249 light Machine gun
- M240 GPMG
- DShKM heavy machine gun
- Browning M2HB

=== Launchers and grenade launchers ===
- M203 grenade launcher
- RPG-7
- RPG-27
- M136 AT4
- Mk 153 Shoulder-Launched Multipurpose Assault Weapon
- Milkor MGL
- Daewoo Precision Industries K4
- Mk 47 Striker

=== Vehicles ===
- Promoter DAPC-2
- Humvee

== Sources ==
- Gordon, Michael (R.) (2022). Degrade and Destroy: The Inside Story of the War Against the Islamic State, from Barack Obama to Donald Trump. New York: Farrar, Straus, and Giroux. ISBN 978-0374279899.
- Jones, Richard D.; Ness, Leland S., eds. (2009). Jane's Infantry Weapons 2009/2010 (35th ed.). Coulsdon: Jane's Information Group. ISBN 978-0-7106-2869-5.
- Neville, Leigh (2015). Special Forces in the War on Terror. General Military. Osprey Publishing. ISBN 978-1-4728-0790-8.
- Witty, David (2015). The Iraqi Counter Terrorism Service (PDF). Washington, D.C.: The Brookings Institution.
- Witty, David M. (2018). "Iraq's Post-2014 Counter Terrorism Service" (PDF). Washington Institute for Near East Policy. Archived from the original (PDF) on October 25, 2019.
