= Siege of Amirli =

2014 siege in Iraq

Coordinates: 34.7250°N 44.5875°E

- Part of the Salahuddin campaign and sectarian violence against Sunni Arabs in Iraq
- A map of Saladin Governorate, where Amirli is located
Date	11 June 2014 – 31 August 2014 (2 months, 2 weeks and 6 days)
Location	Amirli, Saladin Governorate, Iraq
Result	Iraqi and allied victory
Territorial changes	ISIL is driven out of the eastern part of the Saladin Governorate

Belligerents
Islamic State; Wilayah Salah-Al-Din	Iraq; Iraqi Army; Iraqi Turkmen Front; Iran; IRGC; Quds Force; Special Groups; Promised Day Brigades; Asa'ib Ahl al-Haq; Kata'ib Hezbollah; Badr Brigades; 16th Turkmen Brigade; Kurdistan Region; Peshmerga; Air support: United States; Iran; Aid support: United States; United Kingdom; France; Australia

Commanders and leaders
Abu Bakr al-Baghdadi (Leader of ISIL); Abu Omar al-Shishani (Military Chief) (Islamic State) Abu Muslim al-Turkmani (Deputy, Iraq)	(Iraq) Abdul Emir al-Zaidi (Iran) Qasem Soleimani (Kurdistan Region) Kareem Mullah Shakoor; Hadi Al-Amiri; Kareem al-Nouri; Muqtada al-Sadr

Strength
Unknown	Badr Brigades: 4,000

Casualties and losses
147 killed 15 captured	16 killed 6 executed 39 wounded

The siege of Amirli was a siege of the predominantly Shi'ite Turkmen town of Amirli in Iraq by the Islamic State of Iraq and the Levant (ISIL) during the War in Iraq. The town was besieged by ISIL forces for 50 days from June 2014, lacking access to food, electricity, and water. Most of the residents are Shia Turkmen, who had organized local self-defense militias to fight against ISIL. On August 31, the Iraqi military reportedly broke the siege and entered the town. It has been described as "Iraq's biggest victory against ISIS", as of September 2014.

Iran had reportedly played a "military planning" role in breaking the siege of Amirli.

== Events ==
=== Siege ===
The siege began in June, after Islamic State of Iraq and Syria (ISIL) forces advanced on Iraqi positions in Northern Iraq. They attacked the town, but failed to capture it after townspeople armed with AK-47s put up resistance. However, ISIL had more powerful weapons compared to the local militia, prompting fears that they would try to storm the town. ISIL forces continued to fire mortars and rockets into the town and launched raids against it. 20,000 citizens in Amirli were in danger from being killed by ISIL, dying from thirst or hunger.

The United Nations expressed concern over the situation in Amirli, and warned about the possibility of ISIL committing a massacre in the town.

=== Military efforts ===
On 30 August, the Iraqi Army, Shi'ite militias and Peshmerga started a campaign to break the siege, after the speaker of Grand Ayatollah Ali al-Sistani, Abdul-Mahdi al-Karabalai, called to move and break the siege by ISIL on the town. The forces attacked ISIL from three areas, the army attacked from the south of Amirli in Adhaim, the Peshmerga attacked from the north in Tuz Khurmatu, the militias attacked from the east in Kifri.

Kataib Hezbollah helicoptered in 50 of its best fighters, according to Abu Abdullah, a local Kataib Hezbollah commander. The fighters set up an operations room to coordinate with the Iraqi army, the other militia groups, and advisers from the Quds Force, the branch of Iran's Islamic Revolutionary Guard Corps that handles operations outside Iran and oversees Tehran's Iraqi militias.

On 31 August, the United States, France, United Kingdom and Australia began humanitarian aid drops, like food, water and medical supplies, to help prevent a potential massacre against the Shi'a Turkmen minority in Amirli. The US also carried out air strikes on ISIL positions around and near Amirli. Iraqi officials stated that they had reached Amirli and broken the siege and that the military was currently fighting to clear the areas around the town.

On the same day, with the support of the US Air Force, the offensive troops succeeded in breaking the siege and freeing the villages around it, with the local citizens cheering and celebrating the end of the siege. The speaker of the Iraqi Armed Forces, Qasim Atta, stated that the troops succeeded in breaking the siege by entering the Amirli from the south. The offensive forces are proceeding in opening the Baghdad–Amirli road.

== Aftermath ==
After regaining control over Amirli, on 1 September, the Iraqi Army and its allies went on and retrieved the town of Suleiman Bek (90 km east of Tikrit) from ISIL. An Iraqi official stated that 23 Chechens from ISIL were killed, including 10 snipers.

Following the operations to end the Amirli siege, pro-government militias and volunteer fighters as well as Iraqi security forces raided Sunni villages and neighborhoods around Amirli in Saladin and Kirkuk Governorates. Many were villages that ISIL had passed through and in some cases used as bases for their attack on Amirli. During the raids, militiamen, volunteer fighters and Iraqi security forces looted possessions of civilians who fled fighting during the onslaught on Amirli; burned homes and businesses of the villages' Sunni residents; and used explosives and heavy equipment to destroy individual buildings or entire villages. The Human Rights Watch documented the abduction of 11 men in the course of the government's operation, but local residents said many other men of fighting age had gone missing.

== See also ==
- Military intervention against ISIL
  - Iranian intervention in Iraq (2014–present)
  - American-led intervention in Syria
- Fall of Mosul
- Sinjar massacre
- Siege of Kobanî
- Fall of Hīt (2014)
- ISIL takeover of Derna
- Battle of Baiji (October–November 2014)
- Battle of Ramadi (2014–15)
- Battle of Baiji (2014–15)
- December 2014 Sinjar offensive
- List of wars and battles involving ISIL
