= Second Battle of Baiji =

2014–2015 battle

Coordinates: 34.9333°N 43.4833°E

- Part of War in Iraq and the Salahuddin campaign
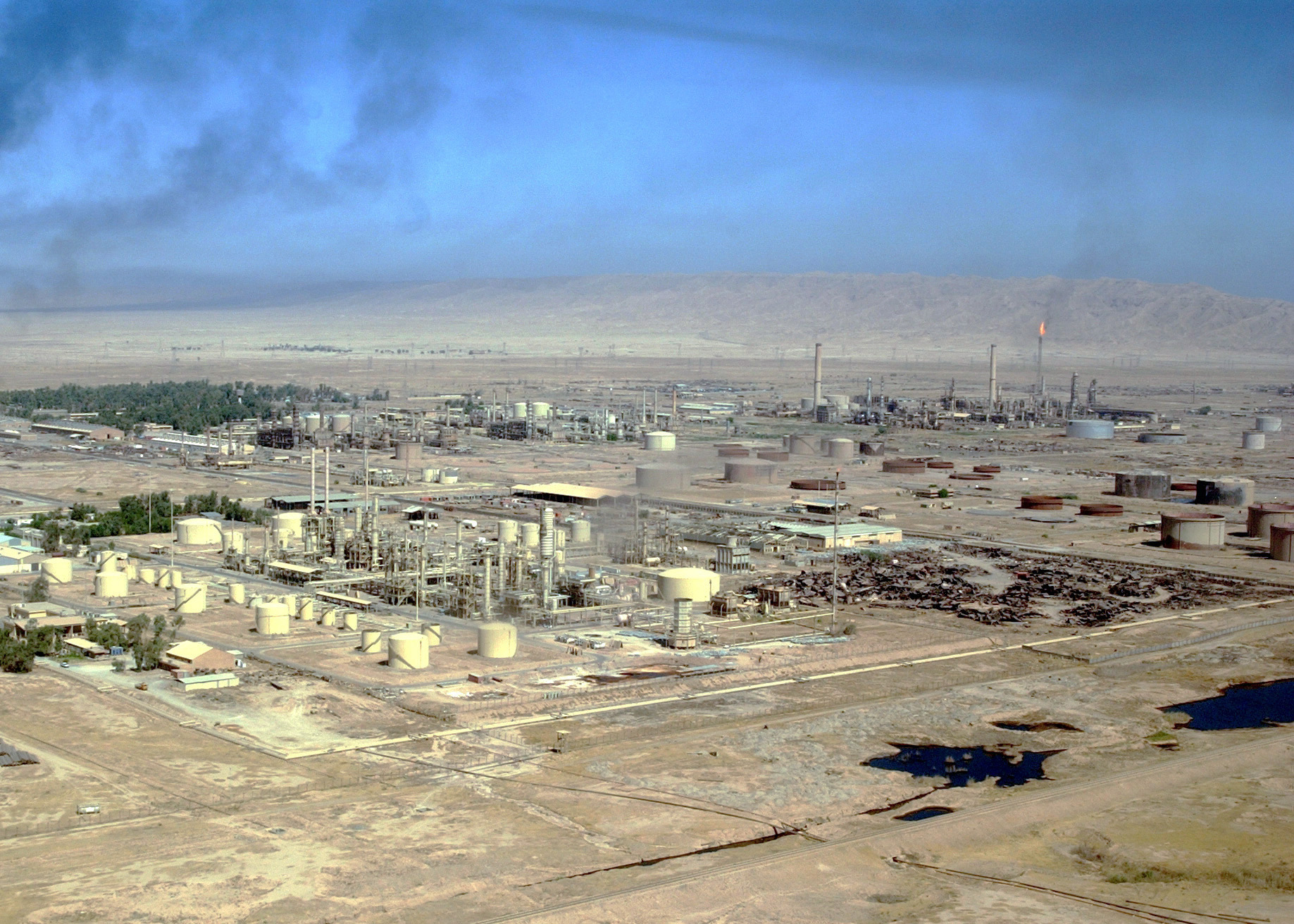
- Baiji's oil facilities were one of the most intensely contested areas during the fighting against ISIL
Date	29 October 2014 – 22 October 2015 (11 months, 3 weeks and 2 days)
Location	Baiji, Saladin Governorate, Iraq
Result	Iraqi victory: Iraqi Army takes control of Baiji and breaks the siege of the oil refinery in mid-November 2014; ISIL recaptures the city and re-establishes the siege of the oil refinery in late December 2014; Iraqi forces fully recapture the city in late October 2015

Belligerents
Iraq; Iran Airstrikes: United States; United Kingdom; France; Canada	Islamic State of Iraq and the Levant

Commanders and leaders
(Iraq) Lt. Gen. Abdul-Wahab al-Saadi (Iraq) Col. Saleh Jaber (Iraq) Maj. Gen. Ayub Khalif †; Hadi al-Amiri; Qais Khazali; Abu Mahdi al-Muhandis (Iran) Qasem Soleimani	(Islamic State) Abu Ibrahim † (ISIL commander of the Baiji Oil Refinery forces) (Islamic State) Khalaf Eidan † (ISIL Emir of Baiji)

Units involved
Iraq: Iraqi Security Forces; Armed Forces; Army; Special Operations Forces; Federal Police; Mosul Battalion; Popular Mobilization Forces; Shia Militias; Kata'ib Hezbollah; Badr Brigades; Harakat Ahrar al-Iraq; Asa'ib Ahl al-Haq; Iran: Iran Air Force; Quds Force; United States: United States Air Force; United Kingdom: Royal Air Force; France: French Air and Space Force; Canada: Royal Canadian Air Force	Military of ISIL

Strength
15,000 fighters: 5,000 Iraqi soldiers and policemen; 10,000 Shi'ite militiamen	2,000 fighters

Casualties and losses
2,500 killed, hundreds wounded	920+ killed
- 197+ killed and 122 wounded 7 civilians executed by ISIL

The Second Battle of Baiji took place in Baiji, Iraq, lasting from late October 2014 to late October 2015. In mid-November 2014, Iraqi forces retook the city of Baiji, and re-entered the Baiji Oil Refinery. However, fighting continued in the region, and on 21 December 2014, ISIL forces took Baiji and put the Baiji oil refinery under siege once again, before Iraqi forces recaptured the city on 22 October. It gave Iraqi forces complete control of the highway stretching from Baghdad to Baiji, and allowed Iraqi forces to use Baiji as a base for launching a future assault on Mosul.

== Background ==
On 11 June 2014, ISIL insurgents advanced into Baiji, seizing the main court house and police station and setting them on fire. The militants, who were travelling in a group of around 60 vehicles, also took control of the Baiji prison and freed all the inmates within. Local residents told members of the media that ISIL sent a group of local tribal chiefs ahead of them to convince the 250 guards at the oil plant to withdraw, while soldiers and police had been warned to leave as well. Later in the day, militants reportedly retreated from Baiji either due to persuasion from local tribal leaders or due to reinforcements from the Iraqi Army's Fourth Armored Division arriving in the city. However, the next day it was confirmed ISIL was still in control of the town, except the refinery which was surrounded.

On 18 June, ISIL attacked the refinery with mortars and machine guns. An official from inside the refinery stated the militants had captured 75 percent of the facility, while a military spokesman claimed the attack had been repelled with 40 insurgents being killed.

On 19 June, Iraqi government forces claimed to have regained full control of the Baiji oil refinery, after heavy fighting that left 100 militants dead. An Iraqi witness who drove past the Baiji refinery told the Associated Press that ISIL had hung their banners from the watch towers and created checkpoints surrounding the facility, despite government claims of control.

On 20 June, the town was still under complete control of the militants while the oil refinery was surrounded by ISIL forces and had once again come under attack.

Iraqi security forces repelled several ISIL attempts to take the refinery between June and October 2014.

On 14 November, it was reported that the Iraqi Army had taken full control of the city, forcing ISIL forces to withdraw.

On 18 November, the anti-terrorism force Mosul Battalion entered Baiji refinery for the first time since June. However, this could not be confirmed independently. If confirmed, it would be a major victory for Iraqi forces. Iraqi State television said that they had entered the gates of the refinery. Meanwhile, it was confirmed that Iraqi forces were in full control of Baiji. Iraqi state television said Baiji's recapture was a "Graveyard for ISIS". Later, the US Department of State congratulated the Iraqi forces for retaking the country's largest oil refinery, confirming the Iraqi victory.

On 20 November An RAF Tornado GR4 attacked three buildings occupied by ISIL militants in support to Iraqi ground forces, which were countering ISIL activity in the vicinity of the Baiji oil refinery.

By 25 November, fighting in the city center continued, with ISIL fighters still being present in four out of 12 of Baiji's neighborhoods. The militants were also continuing to hold positions at the refinery's perimeter.

On December 7, Two RAF Tornado GR4's provided air support for Iraqi ground forces under fire from ISIL terrorists, in the vicinity of Baiji, destroying an ISIL position and then using a Brimstone missile.

Between 13 and 18 December, ISIL recaptured seven neighborhoods, including the central part of the city, after Iraqi government forces retreated, due to a lack of support and ammunition.

On 21 December, ISIL forces recaptured the city of Baiji. ISIL forces also managed to re-establish a siege of the Baiji Oil Refinery.

== The battle ==
=== Advance into the city and to the refinery ===
On 29 October 2014, Iraqi government forces and allied militias advanced to within 2 km of the city of Baiji in an attempt to retake the city and break the siege of the refinery.

On 31 October, the Iraqi forces entered the town and captured two neighborhoods before their operations were halted due to a triple ISIL suicide-attack, followed by a ground assault, on the Army headquarters at the Tikrit University further south.

On 4 November, two British Royal Air Force Tornado GR4 aircraft flying in support of Iraqi ground forces attacked and destroyed an Islamic State pickup truck using a Brimstone missile.

On 7 November, police Major General Faisal Ahmed was killed by a suicide truck-bomber in Baiji. Two days later, Iraqi forces took control of parts of the city. Using helicopters to attack the militants, they entered the city from the south and the west, and took over the city center and the al-Tamim neighbourhood. This left ISIL forces stranded between the city and the refinery, as Iraqi forces advanced slowly due to car-bomb attacks on the road. It was reported that Iraqi forces had control of 40% of the city center. Many residents said that there were non-stop clashes in the area.

On 10 November 10, a British MQ-9 Reaper identified and attacked a group of ISIL militants which had been laying improvised explosive devices in the area. A single Hellfire air-to-surface missile was used to conduct the attack.

On 11 November, an ISIL suicide-bomber killed eight people in Baiji. The bombing occurred after a large crowd of people gathered around soldiers who had taken parts of the city center.

On 14 November, it was reported that the Army had taken full control of the city, forcing ISIL forces to withdraw, with their next target being the oil refinery. The next day, Iraqi forces reached the facility's gates, breaking the ISIL siege of the refinery. Three days later, state TV aired footage of soldiers entering the Baiji refinery for the first time in months. An Iraqi reporter said that the security forces had "made the refinery a graveyard" for ISIL. Later, the US Department of State congratulated the Iraqi forces for retaking the country's largest oil refinery.

By this point, it seemed that the demoralized Iraqi Army had scored a badly needed, decisive victory.

=== Fighting continues and ISIL counterattack ===
By 25 November, fighting in the city center continued, with ISIL fighters still being present in four out of 12 of Baiji's neighborhoods. The militants were also continuing to hold positions at the refinery's perimeter.

Between 13 and 18 December, ISIL recaptured seven neighborhoods, including the central part of the city, after Iraqi government forces retreated, due to a lack of support and ammunition. On 21 December, the ISIL jihadists recaptured the city and re-established a siege of the oil refinery, as Iraqi security forces continued to defend the main roads towards the Speicher military base and the Baiji Oil Refinery.

=== Initial assault ===
On 23 December 2014, Iraqi forces and Shi'ite militia fighters launched an assault on the city of Baiji, after having lost control of the city to ISIL forces only two days earlier.

On 16 January 2015, A patrol of Tornado GR4's, operating near Baiji in support of Iraqi ground forces, attacked three ISIL positions with Paveway IV laser-guided bombs. A fourth position nearby was attacked shortly afterwards.

On 4 February 2015, a pair of Tornado GR4's conducted an armed reconnaissance patrol over Baiji in support of Iraqi ground forces. Two ISIL armoured vehicles were identified in a building and were attacked with two Paveway IV laser-guided bombs, scoring two direct hits.

=== Renewed ISIL offensive ===
In early March 2015, ISIL launched a fresh offensive on Baiji, after some Iraqi troops were redeployed to Tikrit, to aid the Iraqi government in retaking that city. However, the Iraqi government planned to send reinforcements to Baiji once the Second Battle of Tikrit had fully concluded.

On 7 April 2015, 60 ISIL militants were killed by Iraqi forces in Baiji.

On 11 April 2015, ISIL launched an assault on the Baiji Oil Refinery, claiming to have seized full control of it, which Iraqi forces denied.

On 13 April 2015, RAF Tornado GR4s provided close air support for Iraqi ground forces by patrolling ahead of the Iraqi troops and successfully attacking four buildings within an ISIL military compound with Paveway IVs.

=== Iraqi counter-offensive and continuing ISIL assault ===
On 14 April, hundreds of ISIL reinforcements arrived from Ar-Raqqah, Syria, after staying three days in Mosul. Beginning on 14 April, the US-led Coalition escalated its airstrikes in the region, after a recent ISIL offensive. From 14–15 April, the US-led Coalition conducted 9 airstrikes in and around Baiji, which struck two large and six smaller tactical units, and destroyed two ISIL fighting positions and an ISIL heavy machine gun. From 15–16 April, the US-led Coalition conducted eight airstrikes in and around Baiji, which struck two large and four smaller tactical units, destroyed two ISIL structures, an ISIL mortar system, an ISIL fighting position, and an ISIL vehicle. From 16–17 April, the US-led Coalition conducted five airstrikes in and around Baiji, which struck five ISIL tactical units, destroyed four ISIL vehicles, three ISIL fighting positions, and an ISIL heavy machine gun.

On 14 April, it was reported that Iraqi General Ayub Khalif was killed by ISIL while defending the Baiji Oil Refinery, along with 9 of his men.

On 17 April, it was reported that ISIL withdrew from most parts of the Baiji Oil Refinery, after suffering high casualties inflicted by entrenched Iraqi Volunteers Forces.

From 19–20 April, the US-led Coalition conducted another eight airstrikes in and around Baiji, which struck four ISIL tactical units, destroyed two ISIL VBIEDS, an ISIL machine gun, an ISIL artillery piece, an ISIL ammo storage facility, and an ISIL vehicle.

On 23 April, it was revealed that ISIL was still inside the Baiji Oil Refinery, after the US and the Iraqi Government had claimed that the refinery had been secured and cleared off ISIL fighters. On the same day, Iraqi federal policemen arrived in Baiji, to reinforce the Iraqi Army positions there.

From 25–26 April, the US-led Coalition conducted 7 airstrikes in and around Bayji, which struck six ISIL tactical units, destroyed three ISIL fighting positions, three ISIL vehicles, an ISIL warehouse, and an ISIL mortar system.

On 27 April, ISIL militants launched an attack on the Baiji Oil Refinery, destroying three depots and several Iraqi forces. On 28 April, ISIL forces claimed to be in middle of the Baiji Oil Refenery.

On 29 April, Raid al-Jabouri, the Iraqi Governor of the Saladin Governorate, stated that Iraqi forces were ready to launch a counter-offensive the retake the areas around Baiji and Shargat. On the same day, al-Joubouri also stated that large military reinforcements were set to arrive in Baiji, later on the same day.

On 2 May, Iraqi forces killed Abu Ibrahim Chechen, the commander of the ISIL forces at the Baiji Oil Refinery.

From 2–4 May, the US-led Coalition conducted 13 airstrikes in and around Baiji, which struck one large and eight small ISIL tactical units, destroying eight ISIL fighting positions, three ISIL buildings, and ISIL command and control facility, two ISIL mortar tubes, an ISIL heavy machine gun, an ISIL VBIED, and an ISIL vehicle.

From 6–7 May, the US-led Coalition conducted 6 airstrikes in and around Baiji, which struck an ISIL large tactical unit, destroying two ISIL fighting positions, four ISIL structures, an ISIL VBIED, and an ISIL vehicle. On 10 May, Iraqi forces reportedly broke the ISIL siege of the Baiji Oil Refinery, but ISIL soon re-entered parts of the refinery, nearly severing all of the Iraqi supply lines leading to it

On 15 May, it was reported that ISIL fighters had started setting fire to fuel storage containers, in an attempt to obstruct advances by pro-Iraqi government forces. ISIL forces were still embedded deep within the facility, and the Iraqi security forces were reduced to supplying the defenders by air. An RAF Tornado GR4 used a Paveway precision guided bomb to demolish an ISIL-held building near Baiji.

On 17 May, RAF Tornado GR4s were supporting Iraqi army operations in the Baiji area, safely destroying a car-bomb which the terrorists had positioned ahead of the advancing Iraqi troops.

=== ISIL captures Baiji, Iraqi forces re-enter ===
On 22 May, it was reported that ISIL had managed to capture the city of Baiji. Because of this failure, the US decided to allow Shi'ite militias under the control of the Iraqi Government to join the battle. However, later on the same day, Iraqi reinforcements managed to re-enter the city, and recaptured part of it from ISIL forces. Iraqi forces also managed to recapture the road leading from Baiji to the Baiji Oil Refinery. Additionally, it was reported that parts of the Baiji Oil Refinery were set on fire during the battle.

=== Iraqi advance and ISIL re-entry ===
On 7 June, Iraqi Security Forces and al-Hashd al-Shaabi militia, with aid from US-led Coalition airstrikes, captured the downtown area of Baiji, including the local government building. Small pockets of ISIL fighters were still present in the city, while clashes in the refinery were still continuing.

By 9 June, half of the city was under Iraqi government control.

On 10 June, the US-led Coalition conducted five airstrikes in and around Baiji, which struck four ISIL tactical units, destroying three ISIL vehicles, an ISIL building, and an ISIL VBIED.

On 24 June 2015, it was reported that the city of Baiji had been fully recaptured by Iraqi security forces and Shi'ite militia fighters. However, the Baiji Oil Refinery remained contested.

On 29 June 2015, Iraqi forces, supported by Shi'ite militias, reportedly recaptured the Baiji Oil Refinery from ISIL. Iraqi forces were also clearing the city of Baiji of IEDs and other explosives left behind by ISIL. On 30 June, it was revealed that a small number of ISIL sleepers were still hiding inside Baiji city and its refinery, ambushing Iraqi fighters and hampering the cleanup process with guerrilla attacks and suicide bombings. ISIL also continued to conduct larger attacks, forcing an Iraqi military and militias retreat from three neighborhoods on 5 July.

On 6 July 2015, ISIL was in control of several parts of Baiji city, with clashes erupting inside of Baiji city.

On 7 July 2015, clashes between the Iraqi Security Force and ISIL continued inside of Baiji city.

On 27 July, Iraqi forces killed Khalaf Eidan, the new ISIL emir for Baiji, before he arrived at Baiji from Mosul.

On 29 July, three ISIL suicide bombers attacked a suburb of Baiji and tried to clear the way for other militants, killing 11 Iraqi fighters and wounding 21 others.

On 31 July 2015, Iraqi Defense Minister Khaled Ubaidi stated that the city of Baiji was almost completely under the control of Iraqi government forces. He also stated that ISIL only retained control over the Muhandeseen neighborhood, in the eastern part of the city.

On 2 September, ISIL fighters recaptured parts of the city, undoing much of the gains the Iraqi army had made in the preceding months. By late September, the battle was considered to be stalemated, with the Iraqi army's inability to recapture the city and its refinery considered to be a main stumbling block towards retaking Mosul. ISIL was bringing in fresh reinforcements to replace weary fighters and had control over as much as 50% of the city. Iraqi security forces and Shiite militias were primarily entrenched in the south of the city and were unable to cut supply lines to ISIL controlled areas. In late September 2015, Iraqi forces were able to cut the ISIL supply route to Baiji from the west, but it was reported that they were having trouble cutting the supply lines from the north. It was also reported that 500 more ISIL militants had been killed in Baiji between mid-July and early September 2015.

=== Renewed Iraqi offensive ===
On 14 October, the Iraqi Army, supported by volunteer Shiite militia fighters, as well as the U.S. and Iraqi Air Forces, launched a large-scale offensive to recapture Baiji and its ruined oil refinery.

On 15 October, Iraqi Army forces captured the village of Makhoul, to the north of Baiji, marking the Iraqi Army's farthest advance north in almost a year. Iranian Major General Qasem Soleimani was said to have been the mastermind behind the latest offensive in Baiji. Hadi al-Amiri, the leader of the Popular Mobilization Forces, was also present in the region.

On 16 October, Iraqi forces fully recaptured the Baiji Oil Refinery, as well as the neighboring town of Al Siniyah. It was reported that there were several thousand Iraqi soldiers and Shi'ite militiamen in the city to carry out the offensive. Iraqi forces also severed all of the ISIL supply lines leading into Baiji city, and recaptured multiple other districts in the area, including the town of Al-Siniyah, reducing ISIL's control of Baiji city to a pocket in the southern 40% of the city. A spokesman for the US-led Coalition also stated that Coalition forces had carried out 43 airstrikes in the Baiji region in the past 30 days. Iraqi officials said that after the conclusion of the battle, they planned to retake the towns of Al-Shirqat and Hawija, where they expected heavy clashes.

On 17 October, Iraqi forces advanced northward from the Baiji Oil Refinery area to Mas'haq, recapturing the al-Hanshii and Baiji Thermal Power Station areas, reducing ISIL control of Baiji to a pocket in the southern part of the city, and another besieged pocket between the Baiji Fuel Depot and the Northern Company Fertilizer Plant. Later on the same day, Iraqi Government forces and Shi'ite militia forces pushed further north, besieging the town of Zawiyah, which was near the last ISIL supply route into the Kirkuk Province. At the same time, there were reports of residents fleeing ISIL-held villages to meet the Iraqi forces, or villagers turning on ISIL fighters within their own territory.

On 20 October, the Iraqi Security Forces and the Popular Mobilization Forces recaptured the entire city of Baiji, along with the surrounding region. However, pockets of ISIL resistance continued to persist in some parts of Baiji city, until they were finally cleared by the Iraqi Army and Shi'ite forces on 22 October. On 21 October, Iraqi forces uncovered 19 mass graves in Baiji that contained the bodies of 365 ISIL militants. On 22 October, chairman of the US Join Chiefs of Staff Joseph F. Dunford stated that Iraqi forces had successfully recaptured the oil refinery city of Baiji. US officials also praised the Iraqi soldiers and the Popular Mobilization Forces for successfully recapturing the city of Baiji. Brett McGurk, the Deputy Special Presidential Envoy for the Global Coalition to Counter ISIL, stated that the US had conducted 130 airstrikes in the Baiji region since August 2015, in support of the Iraqi Army and the Shi'ite militias. On 7 November, it was revealed that 920+ more ISIL fighters had been killed during the fighting in Baiji, during the last 3 months of the battle.

== Aftermath ==
On 23 October, Iraqi Prime Minister Haider al-Abadi visited the city of Baiji, declaring that Baiji was finally free from ISIL militants, and that the anti-ISIL forces had won a "valuable victory." Al-Abadi also stated that the battle proved the capabilities of the Iraqi forces, and a Shi'ite commander stated that his forces were removing the IEDs and landmines left behind by ISIL in the city. Additionally, on 23 October it was also reported that members of the Popular Mobilization Forces were bombing houses and government buildings of former Iraqi generals who had fought in the Iran–Iraq War.

=== Clashes in 2016 ===
On 4 May, anti-terrorism forces backed by the Iraqi Air Force foiled ISIL attempt to penetrate the thermal energy area north of Baiji, killing 60 terrorists, mostly Arab nationalities.

== See also ==
- First Battle of Tikrit
- Battle of Baiji (October–November 2014)
- Battle of Ramadi (2014–2015)
- Second Battle of Tikrit (March–April 2015)
- Anbar campaign (2015–2016)
- Battle of Ramadi (2015–2016)
- List of wars and battles involving ISIL
