= Battle of Tikrit =

Battle of Tikrit may refer to:

- First Battle of Tikrit
- Second Battle of Tikrit
