= First Battle of Tikrit =

2014 battle during the War in Iraq and the Salahuddin campaign

Coordinates: 34.6025°N 43.6833°E

- Part of the War in Iraq and the Salahuddin campaign
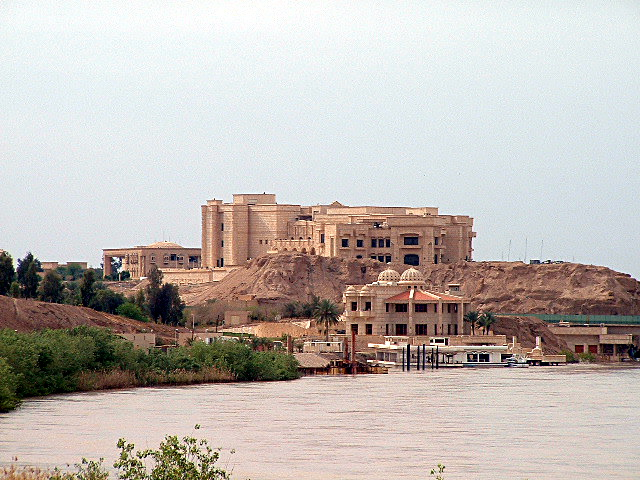
- A view of Tikrit, looking north along the Tigris towards Saddam's presidential palace
Date	26 June – 21 July 2014 (3 weeks and 4 days)
Location	Tikrit, Iraq
Result	ISIL victory
Territorial changes	ISIL and its allies consolidate control over Tikrit and its environs

Belligerents
Iraq; Security forces; Shi'ite private militias; United States	Islamic State; Ansar al-Islam; Islamic Army in Iraq; Hamas of Iraq; Iraqi Ba'ath Party Loyalists; Naqshbandi Army; General Military Council for Iraqi Revolutionaries; Supreme Command for Jihad and Liberation

Casualties and losses
35 killed 3 helicopters lost and 3 damaged	215+ killed (government claim)
- 4 civilians killed 1 Lebanese pilot captured

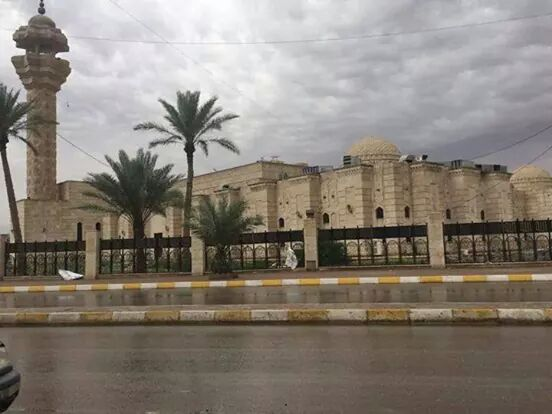
The University of Tikrit, where the battle began

The First Battle of Tikrit was fought for the Iraqi city of Tikrit following the city's capture by the Islamic State of Iraq and the Levant and Ba'athist Loyalists during the 2014 Northern Iraq offensive. The battle took place between 26 and 30 June 2014.

In early June 2014, ISIL took control of a number of cities in northern Iraq, including Tikrit. Tikrit has symbolic significance as the hometown of Saddam Hussein, and is also the administrative center of the Saladin Governorate. The Iraqi government responded on 26 June by launching an air assault operation to recapture the city. This initial attack was reinforced by a ground assault on 28 June. Fighting continued on 29 and 30 June, but the battle was an insurgent victory, with government forces retreating on 30 June. The defeat coincided with ISIL's declaration of a worldwide caliphate on 29 June.

The Iraqi government made another attempt to retake the city on 15 July, but was again defeated. ISIL responded by attacking nearby Camp Speicher on 17 July. Tikrit remained under ISIL control until the Second Battle of Tikrit in March and April 2015.

== Background ==
In December 2013, clashes involving tribal militias, Iraqi security forces, and the Islamic State of Iraq and the Levant (ISIL) broke out throughout western Iraq. Then, in January 2014, ISIL militants successfully took control of Fallujah and Ramadi, bringing much of Al Anbar Governorate under their control.

In early June, insurgents began advancing into the central and northern parts of Iraq. On 10 June, Mosul fell to ISIL, a devastating defeat given that there were 30,000 Iraqi troops in the city facing approximately 1,500 ISIL fighters. Most of the Iraqi Army soldiers refused to fight and fled.

On 11 June, ISIL captured Tikrit. The following day, they executed over a thousand Iraqi Armed Forces cadets at Camp Speicher, located 8 miles northwest of Tikrit.

== The battle ==
=== First government assault ===
On 26 June, Iraqi government forces launched an airborne assault on Tikrit with three or four commando helicopters flown into a stadium at the University of Tikrit. One of the helicopters was shot down and crash-landed at the stadium, while another had to conduct an emergency landing after suffering a mechanical failure. The crew of the second helicopter, which included a Lebanese pilot, was then captured by insurgents. Fierce fighting then ensued around the university compound, while army snipers positioned themselves on tall buildings in the university complex. In the early hours of the assault, a helicopter gunship struck the city's hospital compound. By the next day, sporadic clashes continued at the university as Iranian-trained Shiite militiamen were dispatched and managed to seize control of tall buildings in the university area.

On 28 June, helicopter gunships conducted dawn air strikes against insurgents who were attacking troops at the university campus. By this point, the city had been coming under continuous air strikes for three days, which included barrel bombs. An all-out ground offensive was launched during the day in an attempt to capture the city. A column of troops started out from Samarra towards Tikrit to the north and by sundown had reached the edge of the city. According to Lieutenant General Ahmed Abu Ragheef, another column was directed towards the Camp Speicher air base. There were initial claims by government sources of capturing Tikrit, but in fact Tikrit itself remained under insurgent control as heavy fighting continued to rage on the city outskirts during the night. In the evening, helicopters struck a gathering of people preparing for a wedding ceremony in the village of Al Bu Hayazi, east of Tikrit, killing four civilians.

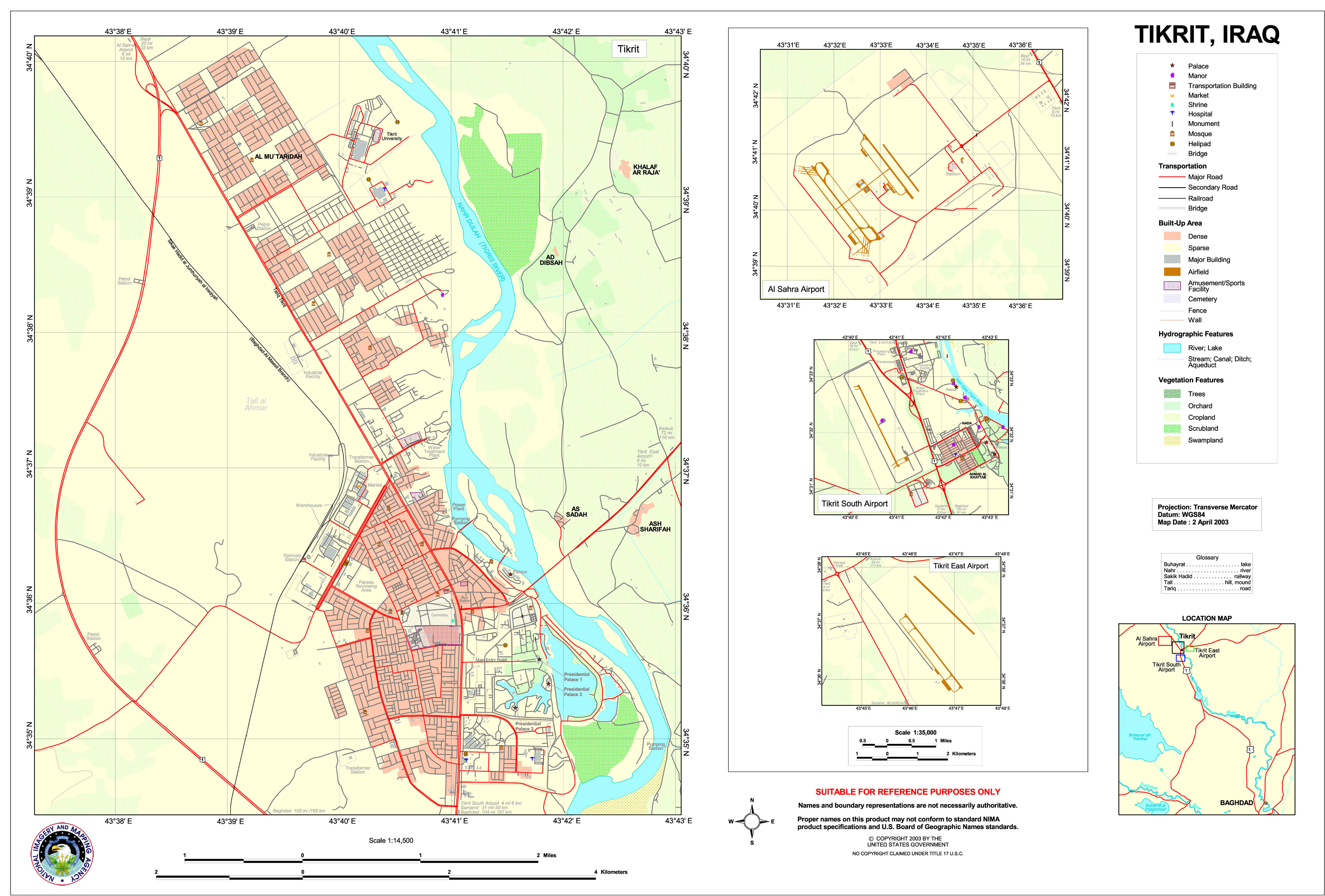
Map of Tikrit. Al Sahra Airport is another name for Camp Speicher.

The next day, troops pulled back away from Tikrit to the nearby town of Dijla, south of the city, in an attempt to regroup after meeting stiff resistance. Fighting also continued near the university and around the air base, which had reportedly come under army control. During the day's battles, another Iraqi army helicopter was shot down over the city and crashed near a market, while the army sent tanks to join the fighting at the university. An Iraqi army spokesman claimed 70 militants had been killed in Tikrit in the previous 24 hours and that the government forces were in control of the university. Neither of the claims were independently confirmed. Later, fierce clashes were reported in an area about 20 kilometers from the city center, toward Samarra. Militants reportedly made an advance but were stopped about 10 kilometers south of Tikrit. That same day, ISIL declared itself a worldwide caliphate.

On 30 June, government forces attempted to move out of the air base and link up with troops at the university but failed after encountering heavy insurgent resistance in the al-Deum area. A military spokesman said that government forces were massing in Samarra and would soon make another push to capture Tikrit. Meanwhile, south of Tikrit, the army managed to recapture the town of Mukayshifah in fighting that an army spokesman claimed killed 40 ISIL fighters.

=== Second government assault ===
On 3 July, an Iraqi Army spokesman claimed the military had regained control of the town of Al-Awja, Saddam Hussein's birthplace, near Tikrit. However, later in the day, two battlefield commanders contradicted him and stated fighting was still continuing on the town's perimeter and in Al-Awja itself.

During this time, troops retreated from the university complex.

On 15 July, the military launched a new assault on Tikrit from Al-Awja. Soldiers and militiamen quickly entered the city, as militants were reportedly retreating, and seized the city's hospital. Following this, the Iraqi government was preparing to declare victory in the battle for the city. However, ISIL militants sprung an ambush, with suicide bombers reportedly leaping from windows into groups of soldiers. Government troops retreated from the city before sunset four kilometers to the south under constant mortar and sniper fire. Several security force vehicles were seen abandoned, with at least one of them burnt out. 52 soldiers and 40 militants were killed in the fighting.

=== ISIL attack on Camp Speicher ===
On 17 July, insurgents launched an assault on Camp Speicher, where an estimated 700 government soldiers and 150 Iranian or Iraqi Shiite militiamen were besieged following the failed attempt to send reinforcements to the air base. The assault included snipers and suicide bombers and the militants quickly managed to reach the runway, at which point Iraqi special forces joined the battle. The base was bombarded and mortared all night. By the next morning, according to various sources, the final pocket of government troops had collapsed, with all of the government forces either killed, executed or captured. At least 25–35 insurgents were also killed. Iraqi forces attempted to save the base's aircraft by flying them out, but according to ISIL 8–9 helicopters were destroyed on the ground or shot down, with several armored vehicles destroyed as well. The Iraqi Army denied the alleged capture of the base with soldiers from the front line reporting that Speicher was still under their control, with only three soldiers being killed, one helicopter destroyed and two damaged. A Tikrit resident also reported continued fighting around the base. Two days later, the military reported that Iraqi special forces had re-secured the base.

Though the United States participated in the battle on the Iraqi side, The Washington Post wrote that some Iranian groups accused the coalition of bombarding a pro-government headquarters in the city. In response, the U.S. Embassy in Baghdad issued a statement denying the allegations.

== See also ==
- 2012–14 Iraqi protests
- Fall of Mosul
- Fall of Hīt
- Battle of Baiji (2014–15)
- Battle of Ramadi (2014–15)
- Second Battle of Tikrit (March–April 2015)
- Spillover of the Syrian Civil War
