= Second Battle of Tikrit =

2015 battle of the War in Iraq

Coordinates: 34°36′N 43°41′E

Battle of Tikrit
- Part of War in Iraq and the Salahuddin campaign
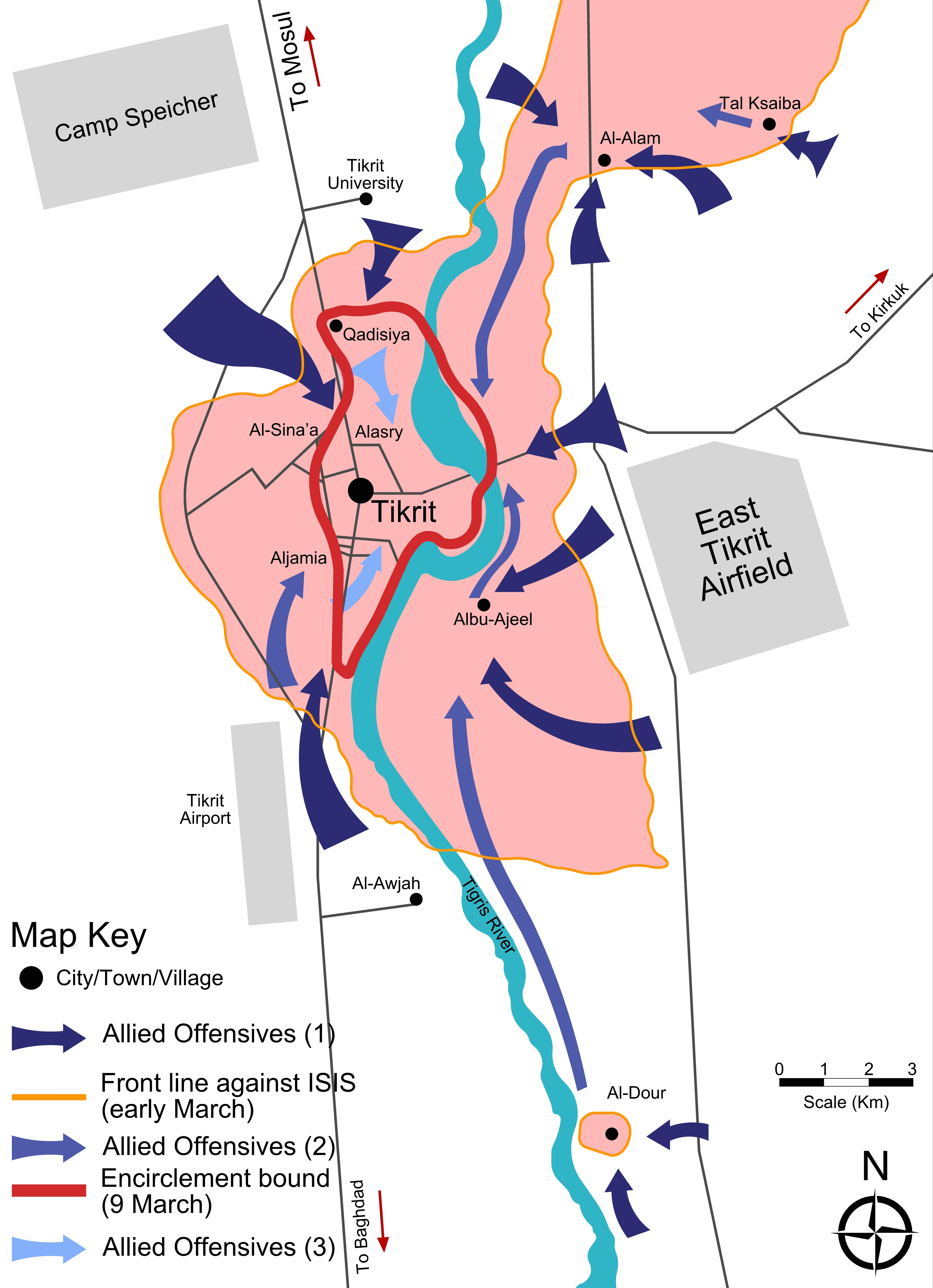
- Military diagram illustrating the situation in central Salahuddin province, from early to mid-March 2015.
| Date | 2 March – 17 April 2015 (1 month, 2 weeks and 1 day) |
| Location | Tikrit, Saladin Governorate, Iraq |
| Result | Iraqi and allied victory: Allied forces encircled Tikrit by 9 March and push into the city 11 March; Allied forces are stalled 13–30 March; Partial withdraw of some Iran-backed Shi'ite militias on 27 March as U.S. & UK start assisting with anti-ISIL airstrikes; Allied forces capture most of Tikrit from 31 March – 2 April, with pockets of ISIL resistance persisting until 17 April; Cleanup and defusing operations in the city continued, with officials predicting that it would take several months to remove the 5,000–10,000 IEDs left behind by ISIL |
| Territorial changes | The provincial capital of Saladin Governorate, Tikrit, is recaptured from ISIL, alongside the towns of Abu Ajeel, Al-Dour, Al-Alam, Al-Awja, and others |

Belligerents
| Iraq; Iran; Airstrikes: United States (25–31 March only); United Kingdom (25–29 March only); France | Islamic State of Iraq and the Levant |

Commanders and leaders
| (Iraq) Lt. Gen. Abdel-Wahab al-Saadi (Saladin Operations commander) (Iran) Qasem Soleimani (Head of Quds Force) (Iran) Gen. Sadiq Yari † (IRGC commander); PMF commanders: Abu Mahdi al-Muhandis Hadi al-Amiri (Head of Badr Organization); Qais Khazali; Madi al-Kinani †; Ali al-Moussawi † (Iraq) Maj. Gen. Fadhil Barwari (ICTS commander) | Abu Maria al-Iraqi † (Top ISIL leader in Tikrit) |

Units involved
| Iraq: Security Forces; Armed Forces; Army; Air Force; Counter-Terrorism Service; ISOF; Federal Police; Popular Mobilization Units; 16th Turkmen Brigade; Asa'ib Ahl al-Haq; Kata'ib Hezbollah; Badr Brigades; Khorasani Brigades; Kata'ib al-Imam Ali; Kata'ib Sayyid al-Shuhada; Peace Companies; Harakat Ahrar al-Iraq; Sunni tribal militias: Martyrs of Salahiddeen; Iran: Quds Force; United States: USAF; United Kingdom: Royal Air Force; France: French Air Force | Military of ISIL |

Strength
| 20,000–30,000+ (9,000 engaged): 20,000 Shi'ite paramilitaries; 3,200–4,000 Iraqi security forces; 1,000–5,000 Sunni tribesmen; 40 Quds force officers; (specialist reinforcements sent) | 2,000–13,000 |

Casualties and losses
| 230–1,000+ killed | 842–1,142 killed, 80 captured |
- 46 civilians killed 28,000 civilians displaced

The Second Battle of Tikrit was a battle in which Iraqi Security Forces recaptured the city of Tikrit (the provincial capital of the Saladin Governorate) from the Islamic State of Iraq and the Levant (ISIL). Iraqi forces consisted of the Iraqi Army and the Popular Mobilization Forces (the bulk of the ground forces, consisting of Shia militiamen and also some Sunni tribesmen), receiving assistance from Iran's Quds Force officers on the ground, and air support from the American, British, and French air forces.

The city of Tikrit, located in the central part of the Saladin Governorate in north of Baghdad and Samarra and lying adjacent to the Tigris River, was lost to ISIL during the huge strides made by the group during its offensive in June 2014. After its capture, ISIL retaliated with the massacre at Camp Speicher, a nearby training facility for the Iraqi Air Force. After months of preparation and intelligence-gathering, Iraqi forces engaged in offensive operations to fully encircle and subsequently retake the city, starting on 2 March 2015. The offensive was the largest anti-ISIL operation to date, involving some 20,000–30,000 Iraqi forces (outnumbering ISIL fighters more than two-to-one), with an estimated 13,000 ISIL fighters present. It was reported that 90% of the residents of the city left out of fear both of ISIL and retaliatory attacks by Shia militias once the city is captured. As such, most of the residents fled to nearby cities, such as Baghdad and Samarra, or even further to Iraqi Kurdistan or Lebanon.

On 4 April, after several days of heavy fighting and acts of vengeance committed by some Shia militias, the situation in the city was reported to have been stabilized, and the last pockets of ISIL resistance were eliminated, with an Iraqi Police Major reporting that "The situation now is calm." However, on 5 April, continued resistance by 500 ISIL fighters in the city was reported in several pockets, which persisted for another week as government forces continued combing Tikrit for hiding ISIL fighters, especially in the northern Qadisiya District. On 12 April 2015, Iraqi forces declared that Tikrit was finally free of all ISIL forces, stating that it was safe for residents to return. However, pockets of resistance persisted until 17 April, when the last 140 ISIL sleeper agents in the city were killed. Cleanup and defusing operations in the city continued, but Iraqi officials predicted that it would take at least several months to remove the estimated 5,000–10,000 IEDs left behind by ISIL in Tikrit.

== Background ==
Tikrit, the hometown of the ex-president Saddam Hussein, fell to ISIL during the offensive in June 2014. A first attempt to recapture the city in late June 2014 was repelled by ISIL after a few days, as well as another Iraqi attempt to recapture the city in July 2014. Subsequent efforts in December 2014 also failed to make headway against ISIL, which consolidated control over Tikrit and its environs. On the morning of 19 August 2014, Iraqi government troops and allied militiamen launched a major operation, to retake the city of Tikrit from the militants. The military push started early in the morning from the south and southwest of the city. However, by the afternoon, the offensive had been repelled by the insurgents. Additionally, the military lost its positions in the southern area of the city it had captured a few weeks earlier.

The operation in Tikrit counted as the first major attempt by both Iraqi military and the Iran-backed Shiite to recapture ground seized by the Islamic State group since the previous summer.

== Preparations ==
In early February 2015, Iraqi forces and their allies began preparations for an attack on Tikrit, with troops arriving in the nearby city of Samarra. The allied forces were composed of a heterogeneous make-up, including Iraqi security forces; a multitude of Shia militias which received support, training, and leaders from Iran; and a number of Sunni tribes. Iranian leaders included officers from the revolutionary guard's extraterritorial operations division, the Quds Force, including the commander of the Quds Force, General Qasem Soleimani himself.

The Iraqi Army and Security Forces, along with Shia militia groups who call themselves Popular Mobilisation Units, were to push into Tikrit from several directions. Some Iranian commanders took part in leading the operation, with general Qasem Soleimani directing operations on the eastern flank from a village about 35 miles from Tikrit called Albu Rayash. The offensive was the biggest military operation in the Salahuddin region since the previous summer, when ISIL fighters killed hundreds of Iraq army soldiers who had abandoned their military base at Camp Speicher outside Tikrit. Soleimani was also spotted at Camp Speicher where he oversaw elements of the Kata'ib Imam Ali and the Badr brigades.

The Shia paramilitary groups constituted by far the largest component of the allied forces at 20,000 fighters, with 3,000 being the total count of the Iraqi Security Forces and roughly a thousand or so Sunni tribesman making up the rest of the combined army.

An adviser to the Iraqi government was quoted as saying that the attackers were divided into an initial assault force of 9,000, with another group made up of local Sunni tribesmen who were to "pacify" the city, and another group which would work on intelligence gathering, reconstruction work, and dealing with the expected refugee flow caused by the fighting.

According to reports from locals, most of the civilian residents had left Tikrit for Iraqi Kurdistan and Baghdad, leaving mostly ISIL fighters inside the city. The UN estimated that about 28,000 civilians had reached Samarra following the outbreak of the offensive against ISIL.

The U.S.-led Coalition was not initially a participant in the operation. As the battle commenced, Gen. Martin Dempsey mentioned that, while the U.S.-led Coalition had not been directly involved in the offensive, the continuous airstrikes along the length and breadth of ISIL territories in Syria and Iraq had greatly depleted the groups' capacity, and that the newest assault against Tikrit would not have been militarily feasible, were it not for the airstrike campaign in the preceding months throughout the country. The Chairman of the Joint Chiefs also maintained that Iran's overt role could be positive and could only become problematic if it descended into sectarianism.

== The offensive ==
=== Encirclement ===
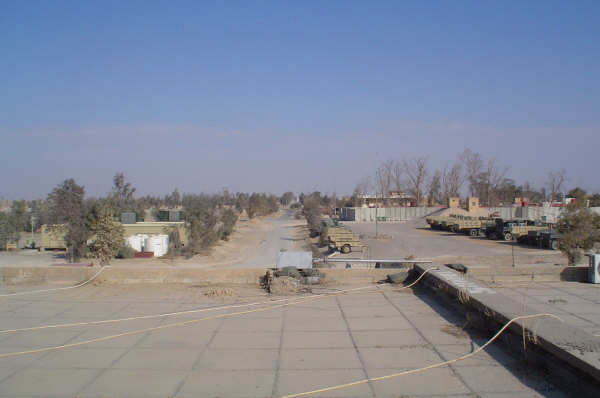
Tikrit Air Academy, (formerly COB Speicher), which was the site of the infamous Camp Speicher massacre by ISIL, was recaptured and used as an offensive launching platform for the second battle of Tikrit where Gen. Qasem Soleimani coordinated the Badr brigade & Kata'ib Imam Ali efforts.

On 2 March 2015, the Iraqi government launched a massive military operation to recapture Tikrit, with 20,000–30,000 allied fighters, backed by aircraft, besieging the city on three fronts.

On 3 March, the Iraqi Security Forces (ISF)—in cooperation with local tribes and militias—captured the strategic oil fields of Alas and 'Ajeel in eastern Tikrit, after the ISIL militants were relentlessly bombarded by a barrage of artillery shells and gunfire from the east. Due to their withdrawal from the Alas and 'Ajeel Oil Fields, ISIL was forced to withdraw towards one of their last strongholds at the town of Al-'Alam, where ISIL was expected to prepare its last stand against the Iraqi Army and its allies in the northern sector of the conflict. Al-'Alam was the last land bridge left for ISIL's communications with the rest of its territories in the province, and if it was cut, it would result in their encirclement.

Continuing their offensive, the ISF took complete control of the highway between Tuz Khurmato and Tikrit, raising the Iraqi flag at the police headquarters in the town of Ksayba, following their fierce clashes with ISIL combatants. East of Tikrit, the ISF and their allies captured the Hamrin Mountains (Jabal Hamrin), killing a number of militants in the process. According to Iraqi media source Haidar Sumeri, four suicide bombers were killed during the battle, including a female identified among the dead militants.

The high number of IEDs (improvised explosive devices) ISIL planted along the possible routes of advance towards Tikrit necessitated that the allied commanders operate with diligence and caution. Another factor contributing to the slowed advance of the allied forces was the large number of ISIL snipers present.

On 5 March, ISIL militants set fire to oil wells in the Ajil field in an attempt to hinder airstrikes against their positions. According to military sources, the allied forces had retaken the village of al-Maibdi, on the road between Tikrit and Kirkuk, as well as the nearby Ajil and Alas oilfields. On 7 March the strategic town of al-Dour, located south of Tikrit, was captured from ISIL and secured, allowing the allies to progress further northward, in support of other contingents on the east bank of the Tigris River, towards Tikrit itself.

On 9 March, the allied forces rapidly advanced on and captured the town of Al-Alam, which lies to the northeast of Tikrit and was the last line of communication ISIL militants had left with their territories to the north. The successful assault on al-Alam, which was commanded by Hadi al-Ameri under the advice of Qasem Soleimani, effectively completed the encirclement of ISIL in and around Tikrit. Despite ISIL's efforts to forestall the rapid advance of the allies on the east bank of the Tigris River, by blowing up the bridge leading to the city, the allies managed to mount a push across the river and establish a bridgehead, though other sources reported that the destruction of the bridge momentarily held up the advance in this sector, with a source saying that "ISIS jihadists blew up a vital bridge over the Tigris River, which may delay the progress operations in the eastern parts of Tikrit." ISIL was suffering heavy casualties, with reports of their dead littering the streets, with only 2,000–3,000 militants left to make a last stand in the city itself.

Also, at this time, ISIL hung dead bodies at the entrance to the northern town of Hawija, which were those of militants who deserted from Tikrit, according to Al Rai's chief correspondent Elijah J. Magnier. Still, ISIL reinforcements were being sent to Tikrit from other parts of Iraq.

=== Push into the city ===
The ground assault on the city itself started on 11 March, and by the next day, approximately three quarters of Tikrit was in allied hands according to Iraqi officials, while the rest remained under ISIL control with only a few hundred remaining ISIL militants reportedly holding out in defending the centre of Tikrit. Under these circumstances, ISIL reportedly resorted to the use of chlorine gas against the allied combatants.

On 13 March, it was revealed that ISIL was still in control of around half of the city, while the ground offensive had stalled. Meanwhile, it was reported that Shia militia fighters and Iraqi government troops were torturing, and conducting revenge killings of, captured ISIL prisoners. Allegedly, captured militants were beaten, shot, beheaded, dismembered, and thrown from buildings by Iraqi forces, with the remains mutilated and photographs posted online. Among the pictures posted on pro-Shia and Iraqi forums and on Instagram were images of beheaded ISIL fighters, while other images showed militants shot and dragged behind trucks, and thrown from high buildings. According to reports, the killings were revenge for similar ISIL atrocities, especially the Camp Speicher massacre of June 2014. In response to the allegations, the Iraqi Army promised an investigation.

By 14 March, the number of ISIL militants holed up in the center of Tikrit had been reduced to around 1,000 (some reports claimed 60 or 70), with Iraqi commanders claiming to be able to purge the city entirely of the enemy within a matter of days, in a slow and methodical approach to minimise casualties from the plethora of IEDs & booby-traps placed by ISIL in the urban area. A temporary halt to the advance was made in order to bring up specialists as well as elite troops with more urban warfare experience for the final push into the city center held by the remaining ISIL militants.

There was a reported surge of material reinforcements for the allied forces during the later stages of the operation, with a myriad of Iranian-made weaponry making it to the frontline. These were said to include tanks, rocket systems, combat vehicles, and even UAVs as U.S. officials told the New York Times that Iran sent drones toward Tikrit, and Iran's state-owned Fars news agency claimed that unmanned vehicles were airborne over the city.

In the period between 10 and 15 March, more than 200 mortar rounds had been launched into the Qadisiya district by the allied forces.

On 16 March, various news outlets reported on the destruction of Saddam Hussein's tomb in his ancestral village of al-Awja. Allied soldiers stated that ISIL had planted IEDs throughout the mausoleum and booby-trapped the entire complex in an attempt to ambush the attackers. The building was completely leveled and only the pillars remained. After Iraqi forces took the control of al-Awja, Shia militiamen of the Popular Mobilization Committee placed the Shi'ite militia's insignia around the village, including that of the Iranian general Qasem Soleimani—their commander, and also a veteran of the Iran–Iraq War waged by Saddam Hussein.

=== Offensive stalled ===
Casualties mounted during urban warfare in the tight city streets of central Tikrit, where ISIL planted a massive number of bombs and prepared a very strong defense at the heart of the city. Due to the unexpected resistance, there were reports of mounting casualties sustained by the allied side, who called up their specialist forces to engage in urban warfare in the city center. One of the commanders of the Asa'ib Ahle-Haq militia stated that, "The battle to retake Tikrit will be difficult because of the preparations (ISIL) made. They planted bombs on all the streets, buildings, bridges, everything. For this reason, our forces were stopped by these defensive preparations. We need forces trained in urban warfare to break in...but any besieged person fights fiercely." In downtown Tikrit alone, there was a reported total of some 6,500 IEDs.

On 17 March, the allied reinforcements started to arrive at Tikrit, and there were also signs that civilians were returning to the recaptured outskirts, such as al-Alam. On 19 March, a U.S. official said that due to the fierce resistance from surviving ISIL forces in the city center, the recapture of Tikrit was "at least two weeks away." On 23 March, Iraqi Security Forces discovered a tunnel connecting Al-Alam to the central part of the city of Tikrit, which was used by ISIL.

=== Coalition airstrikes, partial militia withdrawal ===
In return for air support, the United States demanded that the Iranian-led Shia militias withdraw from the battle. The Iraqi government agreed; though the militia commanders objected and said they would boycott the fight, this had the effect of clearing the way for U.S. involvement and liberation of the city. There were reports from the ground that the disengagement of the militias was incomplete.

On 25 March, the allied forces were supposed to resume their offensive as the United States launched its first airstrikes on ISIL targets in Tikrit. That night, U.S. aircraft carried out 17 airstrikes in the center of Tikrit, which struck an ISIL building, two bridges, three checkpoints, two staging areas, two berms, a roadblock, and a command and control facility. However, the ground assault was pushed back by two days, due to disagreements between the various components of pro-government forces.

The allied ground troops had mixed reactions towards the participation of the United States in the closing phase of the battle. A spokesman for Asa'ib Ahl al-Haq said, "We announced that we will suspend our operations as we won't accept the Iraqi government giving the victory to the Americans on a golden plate. There is no need for the American air strikes now as we have already liberated 90% of Tikrit. We won't let the Americans take the glory for the work they are doing for liberating 10%." However, the most senior commander among the paramilitary groups, Hadi al-Ameri, said that, "From what I understand, Prime Minister Haidar al-Abadi made the request. However, we respect his decision."

The number of remaining ISIL fighters, who continued to control 40 percent of the city, was estimated at 500–750 heavily armed combatants.

On 26 March, Royal Air Force Tornado GR4s, supported by a Voyager tanker, used Paveway IV laser-guided bombs to attack three ISIL strongholds in Tikrit.

On 27 March, the Shi'ite militias, with the exception of the Badr Organization, pulled out of the battle for Tikrit.

On 28 March, the U.S.-led coalition conducted eight airstrikes in and near Tikrit, hitting two large ISIL units, one tactical unit, a vehicle, a vehicle-borne explosive device and 12 fighting positions. Overall, the previous three days of coalition airstrikes had been described as "carpet bombing". Ground fighting itself was inconclusive, with back-and-forth fighting occurring where the same territory was changing hands every half an hour. The regular government troops were in no rush to capture the center of Tikrit, especially since they felt disappointed and in need of changing their plans after the paramilitary forces withdrew from the battle.

On 29 March, an attempt by the Iraqi Army to advance from the southern Shisheen district was repelled when ISIL fighters destroyed a bulldozer being used by the military to clear a path around booby-trapped roads. Between 26 and 29 March seventeen soldiers were killed and 100 were wounded in the street fighting. An RAF Tornado GR4 patrol provided close air support to Iraqi forces near Tikrit. A Brimstone missile was used to destroy an ISIL armoured personnel carrier positioned under a road bridge.

=== Battle for the city center ===
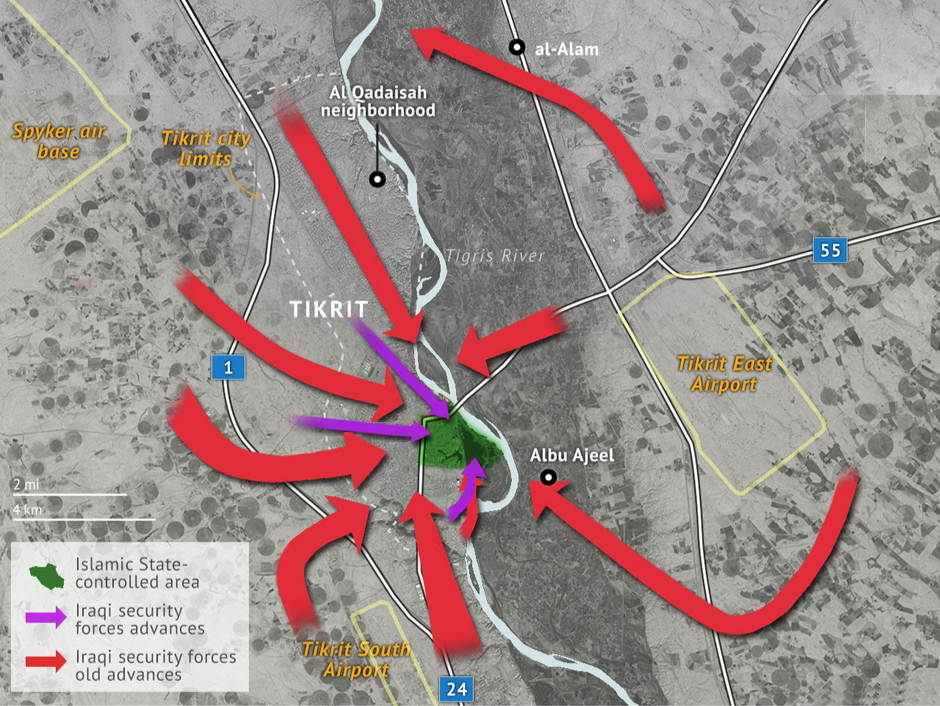
Map of the final push into the city center of Tikrit

On 31 March, Iraqi Security Forces established fire control over the city. Soon afterwards, the ISF advanced into the city center, seizing the Salaheddin provincial government headquarters and the Tikrit hospital, as they moved towards the presidential complex. The ISF and the Hashd Al-Sha'abi militia forces also captured the Central Prison and the Civil Defense Directorate. Soon after government troops reached the city center, the Iraqi Prime Minister declared the city to be captured. "The Iraqi forces have entered downtown Tikrit before a short time and have raised the Iraqi flag on its provincial government building," Haider al-Abadi said in a press conference in Baghdad.

However, U.S. military officials expressed scepticism that the battle was over. By the end of the day, ISIL resistance still remained.

The final stage of the assault was conducted by some 4,000 ISF in conjunction with approximately 10,000 Shi'ite paramilitaries under nominal command of the ISF. At that time, it was also estimated that only 400 ISIL fighters remained inside the city.

On 1 April 2015, it was reported that 150 ISIL fighters had been killed, reducing the number of ISIL in the city to around 250. Late on 1 April, Iraqi security forces reported that they had captured 95% of Tikrit, with only around 30 ISIL fighters reportedly left hiding inside of some houses in the northern parts of the city. They also stated that they expected the battle to end in the coming hours. Meanwhile, Iraqi forces continued dismantling IEDs and other booby traps left behind by ISIL in the city. However, an Iraqi military official in Tikrit stated they had only taken about half of the city.

By 2 April, Iraqi forces had taken more parts of Tikrit, including Saddam Hussein's Presidential Palace. Three ISIL senior leaders were reported to have been killed in the Presidential Palace. However, heavy resistance from isolated ISIL pockets was still reported in the northern neighborhoods of Qadisiya and Alam, where a few hundred ISIL fighters were still present. Also, it was believed that after Tikrit had been fully secured, the Iraqi forces would redeploy to Baiji, to clear the ISIL from that city and the surrounding region, which an Iraqi official later confirmed on 3 April.

=== Clearing the city ===
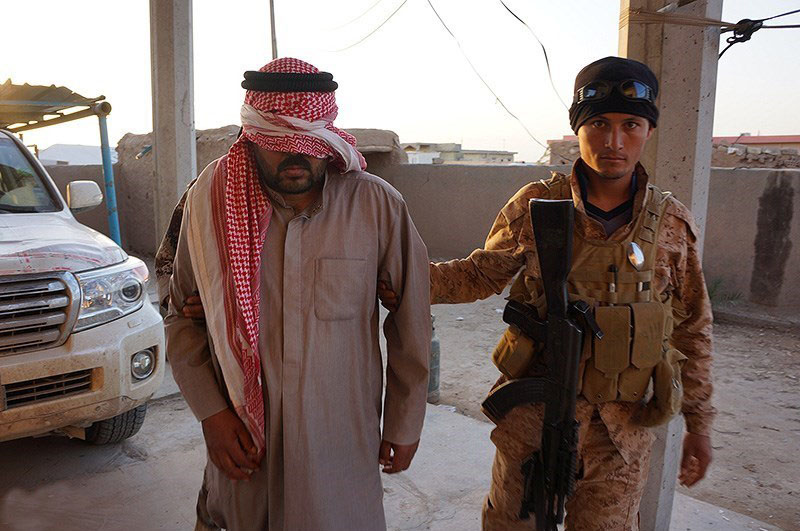
An ISIL fighter captured by Iraqi Security Forces near Tikrit

On 3 April, Iraqi forces continued combating ISIL fighters. Shi'ite militia leader Hadi al-Ameri stated that after the Saladin Governorate was liberated, their next target would be the Anbar Governorate, before finally going on to Mosul.

Beginning on 1 April, Shi'ite militias entered the city, with multiple fighters burning buildings, looting, vandalizing, and mobbing and killing ISIL POWs, and sometimes mutilating their corpses. In one instance, a foreign ISIL fighter captured by the militias was stabbed to death and then hung from a street light, while local forces stood by and witnessed the lynching. Acts like these prompted Iraqi Prime Minister Haider Al-Abadi to order the arrest of anyone caught looting or vandalizing, on 3 April. On 4 April, 80% of the Shia militias pulled out of Tikrit, in response to complaints by locals that some of the fighters had spent several days looting the Sunni city after helping retake it from ISIL. Other reports indicated that looting and deliberate burning of houses and shops was a result of conflict between Sunnis that opposed ISIL and other Sunnis that supported ISIL.

By 4 April, the battle had left Tikrit largely deserted and in ruins, with an Iraqi police major saying, "The situation now is calm" and Iraqi Captain Mahmoud Al-Sad reporting "There are no resistance pockets inside Tikrit."

However, on 5 April, it was reported that 500 ISIL fighters were still holed up in the northern Qadisiya district. On the same day, 12 ISIL militants were killed on the outskirts of Tikrit.

Fighting continued through the next several days, with Brigadier General Thamer al-Hamdani, the director of the Anti-Explosives department in Tikrit, being killed when a booby-trapped house exploded in Qadisiya on 7 April. Throughout 7 and 8 April seventy-nine ISIL militants were reportedly killed in Tikrit, with Iraqi forces also suffering some casualties.

On 10 and 11 April, Iraqi Security Forces continued combing through the last pockets of ISIL resistance in Tikrit. On 12 April, the Iraqi government declared the city free of ISIL forces, stating that it was safe for residents to return home. However, many refugees from Tikrit still feared returning to the city. On the same day, Abu Maria, the ISIL leader of the parts of the Saladin Governorate stretching from Al-Hajaj to Albu-Tema, was killed by Iraqi forces near the Ajil Oilfield, to the northeast of Tikrit. It was revealed that he was killed with his top aide while fleeing from the city of Tikrit.

Despite the Iraqi government declaring Tikrit free of ISIL, ISIL militants continued to hide in the city, until the remaining 140 ISIL sleeper agents were located and killed by Iraqi security forces on 17 April.

== Aftermath ==
On 8 April 2015, Iraqi government forces built on their advances in the area around Tikrit and launched an offensive to liberate the Anbar Province from ISIL. As a result of the Iraqi offensive, ISIL launched a counterattack in the region, capturing 3 villages to the east of Ramadi on 15 April.

Following the end of the battle, cleanup and defusing operations continued in Tikrit. However, Iraqi officials predicted that it would take several months to fully identify and remove all of the 5,000–10,000 IEDs that had been left behind by ISIL in the city.

After the clearing and de-mining operations by the Iraqi army and militias, over 50% of the former inhabitants of the city of Tikrit returned, according to a statement by an Iraqi official. Other towns around Tikrit have also seen large numbers of displaced civilians returning. Al-Alam saw 90% of its population return by mid-September 2015.

== Iran's role ==
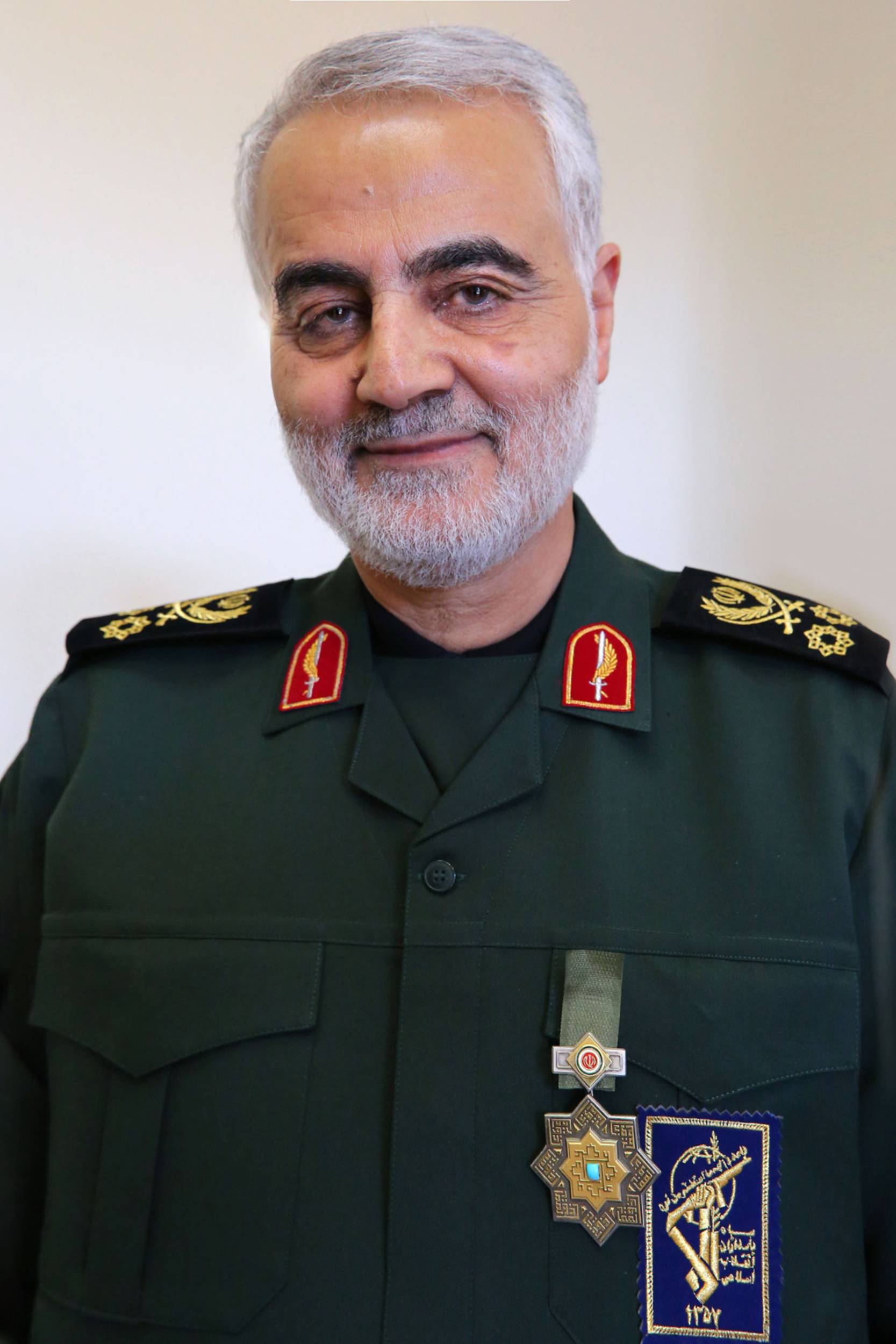
The leader of the Iranian Quds force, Gen. Qasem Soleimani reportedly took up a prominent role in both the planning and execution of the offensive to liberate Tikrit from ISIL.

Some U.S. commentators and media outlets expressed misgivings with regard to the clear and overt role played by Iran and the myriad of Shia militias under its influence and how this could conceivably give rise to further sectarian tensions in the Sunni population of the country. This is while the presence of Iranian military advisers was said to be highly effective on the battlefield, according to CNN. According to several analysts, Qasem Soleimani was organizing and directing the Shia militias in a more deliberate manner, which led to a better-planned assault than previous operations.

It later transpired that Qasem Soleimani was present and participating in commanding the drive on al-Alam where Hadi al-Amiri, the commander of the Badr Organization (the largest militia force involved in the battle), said "He was giving very good advice. The battle ended now, and he returned to his operations headquarters". This effectively left the militants in Tikrit encircled and trapped.

Hadi al-Amiri criticized those who were "kissing the hands of the Americans", saying that the U.S. failed to live up to its promises to help Iraq fight ISIL, unlike the "unconditional" assistance being given by Iran.

== International response ==
U.S. and Iranian officials have repeatedly insisted that they do not coordinate on actions in Iraq. But both sides have taken steps not to interfere with one another's operations. The U.S. ended its involvement in the Second Battle of Tikrit beginning in early March 2015, and was no longer providing airstrikes as in other cases, and is reported to have had minimal or rather no involvement with the offensive at all. Despite this, American general Martin Dempsey, chairman of the Joint Chiefs of Staff, has stated his belief that the Tikrit offensive would have been impossible without US air strikes against ISIL in other areas of Iraq. There are growing concerns on the U.S.'s part that the success of the offensive will only draw Iraq further away and deeper into Iran's sphere of influence. In addition to this, there also seems to be no need or desire for U.S. and coalition support, especially by the largest component of the allied forces, that is the Shi'ite paramilitary groups which are very close to Iran.

Iran's regional rival Saudi Arabia expressed alarm on Thursday, 5 March. "The situation in Tikrit is a prime example of what we are worried about. Iran is taking over the country," Prince Saud al-Faisal, foreign minister of the Sunni Muslim kingdom, said after talks with U.S. Secretary of State John Kerry.

Already there was speculation on the future course of the war against ISIL after the retaking of Tikrit, with analysts hinting at Mosul as the next great target of the allies' thrust northwards along the Tigris River.

Prime Minister Abadi congratulated the Iraqi Armed Forces after the capture of Tikrit's city center.

== Sectarian and humanitarian concerns ==
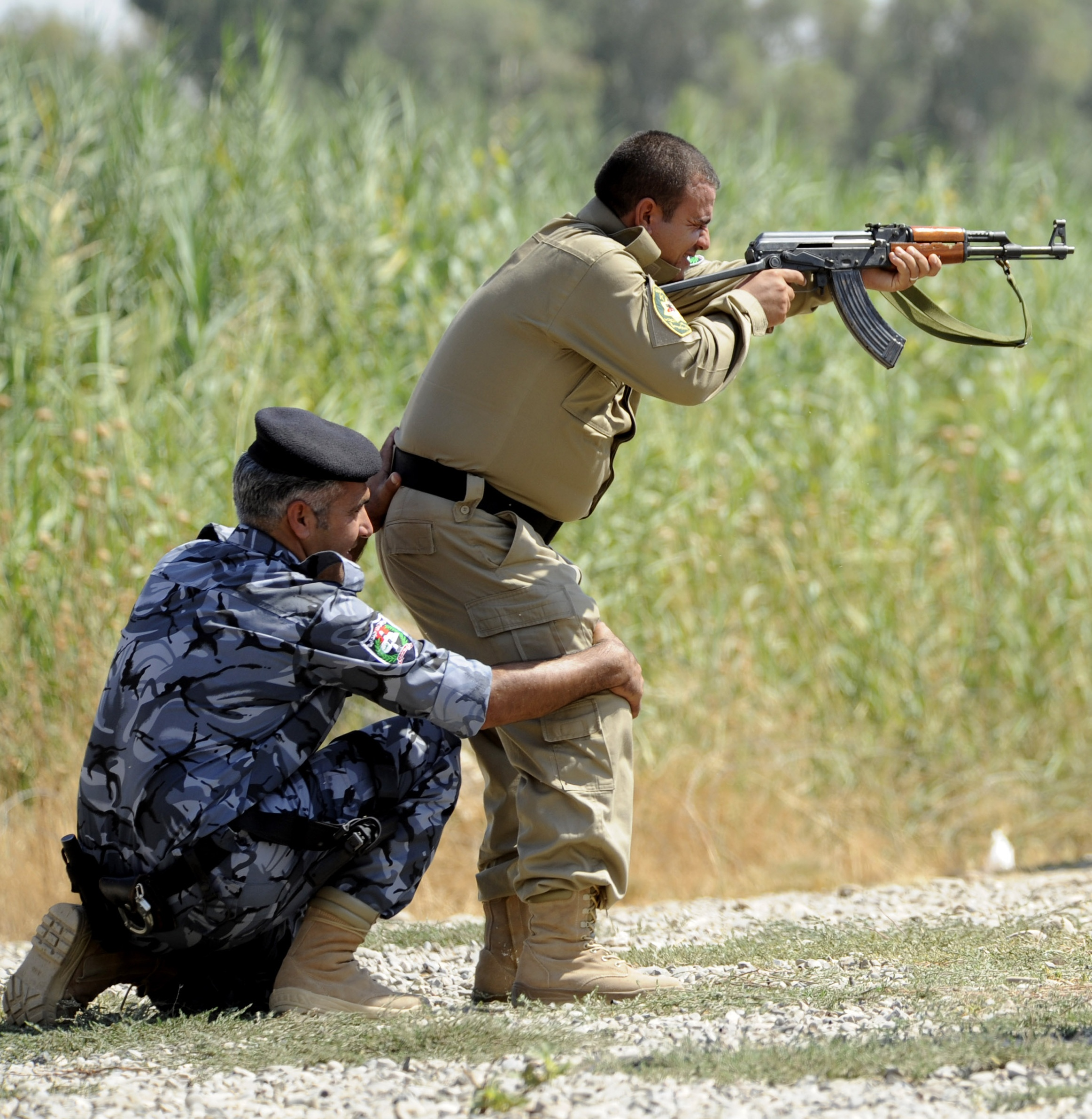
Iraqi Police (seen here in training) have been allegedly involved in a number of serious human rights abuses during the Second Battle of Tikrit.

There have been reports of human rights abuses by both sides in the conflict. Videos have emerged allegedly showing Iraqi Special Operations Forces (U.S.-trained) carrying out various atrocities and war crimes against civilians and captured ISIL militants. After the American network ABC News discovered and compiled the list of visual and documentary evidence and submitted these to the Iraqi government, Iraqi officials announced that they had commenced an investigation, while officials from Human Rights Watch and Amnesty International who reviewed the evidence assembled by ABC said that it was rare to see so much visual evidence of human rights abuses.

The Iraqi Armed Forces are not the only component of the allied army suspected of abuses. The Shia paramilitary groups (trained and supported by Iran) were also accused of playing a part in the human rights violations.

This is the case, despite the fact that a significant faction within the allied forces are Sunni tribesman who fought alongside the ISF & paramilitaries against ISIL. A prominent Iraqi Sunni preacher, Abdul Jabbar, has been quoted as saying "We ask that actions follow words to punish those who are attacking houses in Tikrit... we are sorry about those acting in revenge that might ignite tribal anger and add to our sectarian problems."

== Political ramifications ==
There were widespread concerns over the Sunnis becoming increasingly disenfranchised and alienated from the rest of Iraq if the aftermath of the battle took on a sectarian tone, with the local population being mistreated and thereby increasing the legitimacy of groups such as ISIL. The most crucial stage of the battle was seen as the aftermath and non-military actions taken by the victors, with General Matin Dempsey stating "if what follows the Tikrit operation is not that, if there's no reconstruction that follows it, if there's no inclusivity that follows it, if there's the movement of populations out of their homeland that follows it, then I think we've got a challenge in the campaign."

It remains unclear whether Iran can fully reign in the more zealous elements within their conglomeration of Shia paramilitaries, but it is evident that the Iranians have attempted a non-sectarian strategy both politically, by allowing the fall of Nouri Al-Maliki as well as the appointment of a Sunni to the office of defense minister, and militarily by providing arms to willing Sunni tribes. The Iranian foreign minister described sectarianism as the greatest threat to world security. Despite these claims however, the reports of abuse against Sunni citizens of Iraq at the hands of Iran's allies have not ceased completely. The French MP, Jacques Myard stated that the Iranians had been warning the Iraqis with regard to the possibilities of sectarian actions and the negative consequences which follow.

There have were also reports of the militias engaging in humanitarian relief by handing out food and supplies to the local populace, who expressed gratitude and expressed their contentedness at having been freed from ISIL rule.

A senior adviser to the Iraqi government, Zaid al-Ali, made mention of Shi'ite religious scholars (marja'een) from the city of Najaf travelling to the battlefield to advocate against acts of revenge and abuse.

"Iranians will try to calm the fears of the Sunnis instead of persecuting them because the Iranian officials know that it is in their best interest to keep the Iraq united," said Hadi Jalo, a Baghdad-based political analyst. "For the Iranians, it is easier to dominate one country instead of three separate states." There have also been calls from Saudi Arabia to limit the growing influence of Iran in the country, claiming that Iran is expanding its "occupation of Iraq".

=== Asymmetric blow-back ===
The continuing success of the allied forces (composed of mostly Shia paramilitary groups, though they also contain a significant Sunni contingent), particularly in Sunni areas such as Tikrit, where ISIL had been losing a series of conventional battles, prompted them to utilise more guerilla-like tactics, such as sending out coordinated teams of suicide-bombers to Baghdad, the capital and political nerve centre of the Iraqi government, in order to bring some pressure to bear on the allies. The strategic logic of these operations was explained by an Iraq expert & security analyst Sajad Jiyad; "It's keeping the ISF on their toes. It's to let them know that they can strike anywhere, to force them to spread their forces thin. By letting off such a large series of explosions, it's sending a message that they are going to have to put their forces everywhere. It shows that ISIS can carry out these attacks at will and the ISF cannot relax its guard."

== Casualties and losses ==
The main four washing stations (where bodies are taken to be prepared for burial) in Najaf's Wadi-us-Salaam cemetery reported that around 40–60 bodies had been arriving daily from Tikrit, since the battle started, as of 16 March. On 20 March, reports circulated that 1,000 government fighters (5% of the attacking force) had been killed in the early days of the battle. In contrast, cemetery workers in Najaf reported the arrival of eight militia bodies per day from the entire country, but most from Tikrit. Lt. Gen. Abdul al-Wahab al-Saadi, the commander of the Tikrit offensive, stated 450–750 ISIL militants had been killed by 30 March.

Sadiq Yari, one of the commanders of the Quds Force of Islamic Revolutionary Guard Corps, was killed during battle along with Seyed Ali Mousavi, deputy commander of the Kata'ib Imam Ali Brigades.

== See also ==
- Iranian intervention in Iraq (2014–present)
- American-led intervention in Iraq (2014–2021)
- Fall of Mosul
- Siege of Kobanî
- Sinjar massacre
- Battle of Ramadi (2014–2015)
- Battle of Baiji (2014–2015)
- December 2014 Sinjar offensive
- Anbar campaign (2015–2016)
- List of wars and battles involving the Islamic State
