= Tikrit =

Tikrit تِكْرِيت
- City
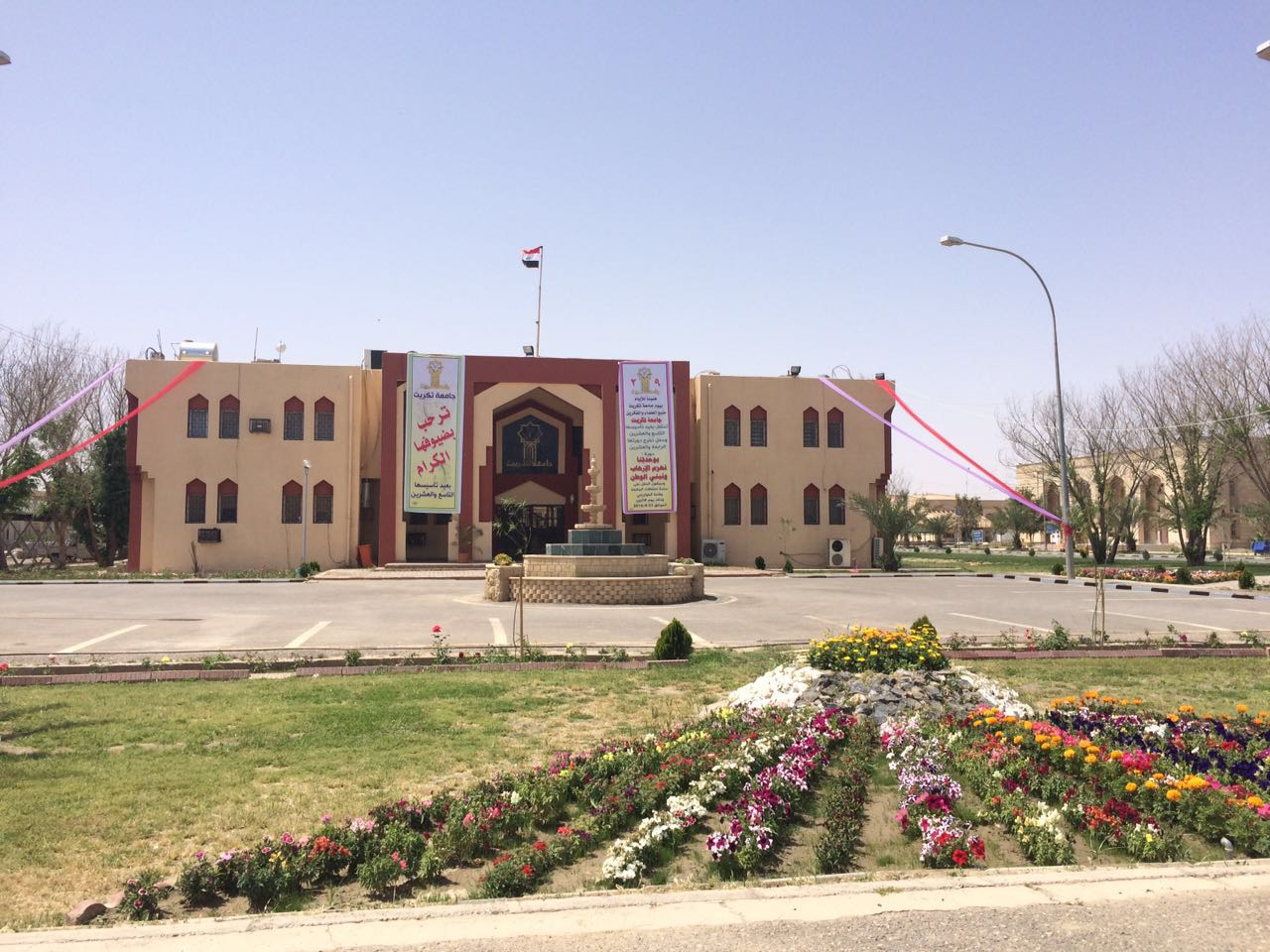
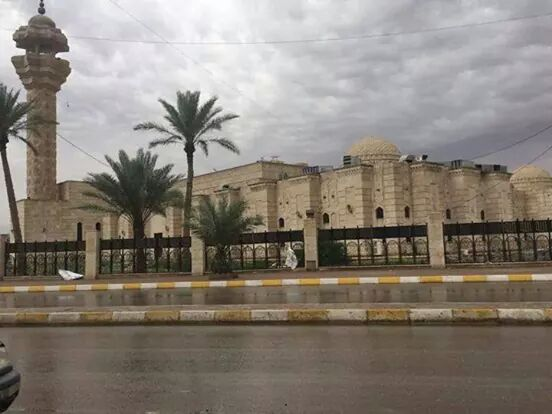
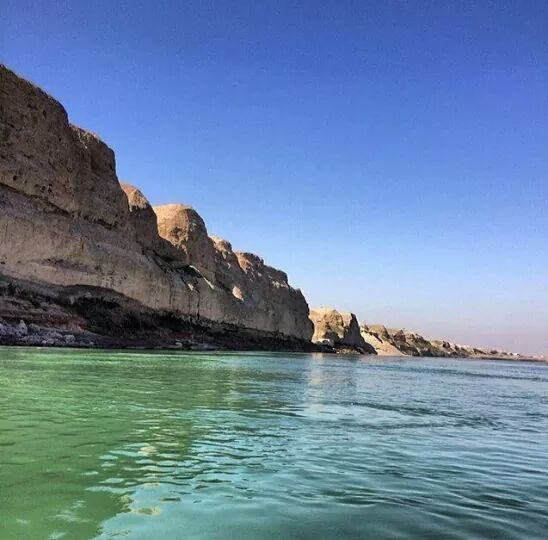
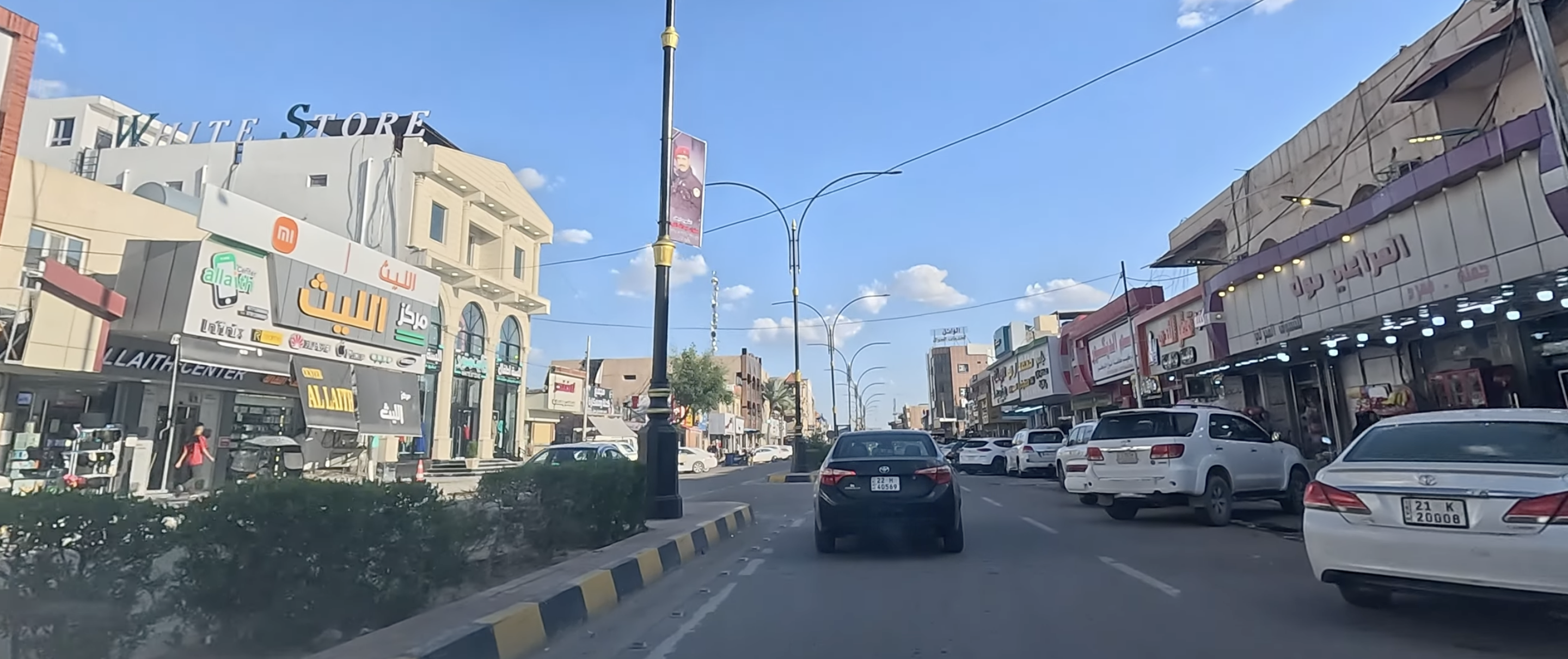
- Top-bottom, R-L: University of Tikrit; Mosque • Tigris River; Aljamia District

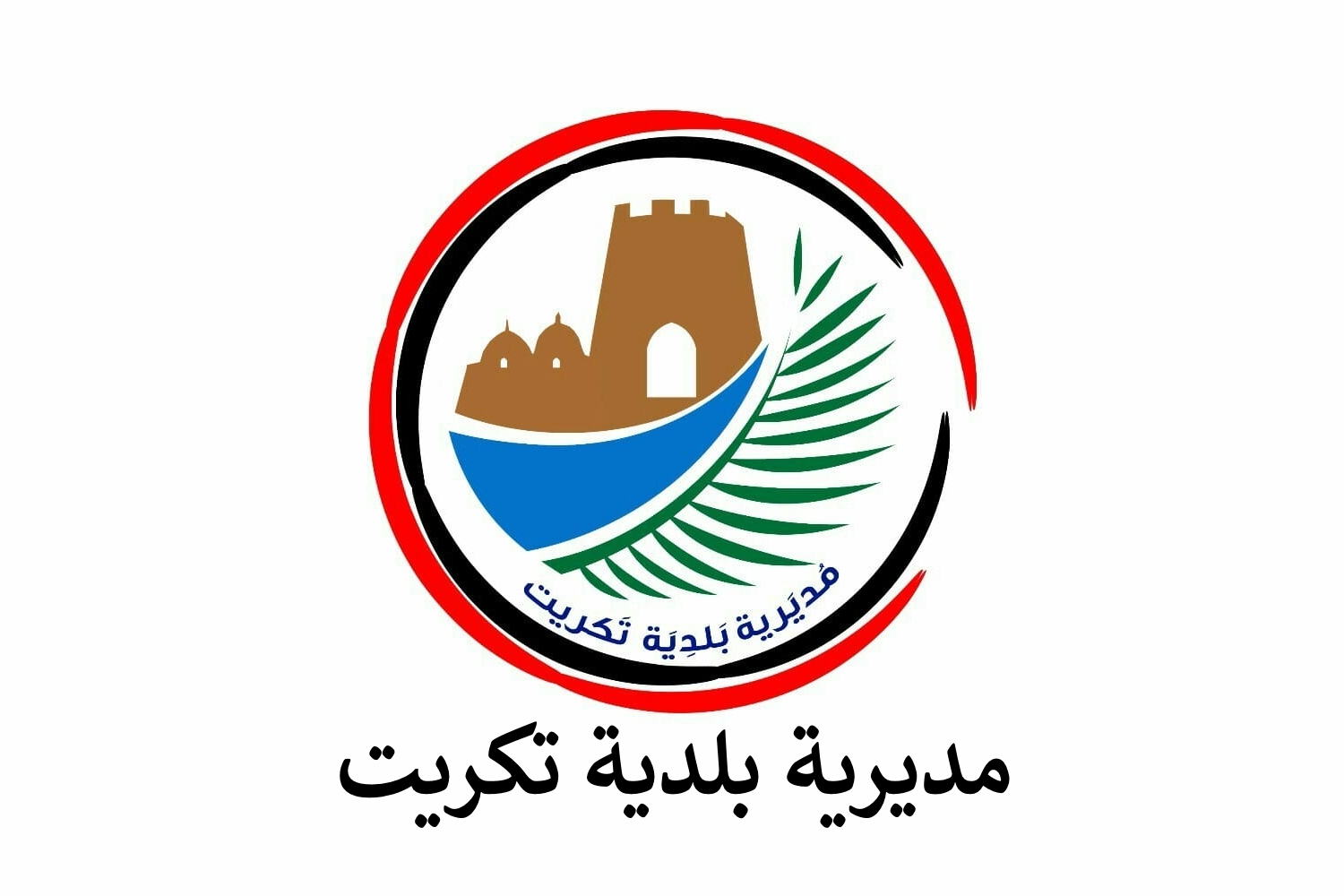
- Flag

- Location of Tikrit within Iraq
- Coordinates: 34°36′36″N 43°40′48″E
- Country: Iraq
- Governorate: Saladin
- District: Tikrit

Government
  - Mayor: Omar Tariq Ismail
- Elevation: 137 m (449 ft)

Population (2012)
  - Total: 160,000

Tikrit (Arabic: تِكْرِيت, romanized: Tikrīt [ˈtɪkriːt]), historically romanized as Tekrit, is a city in Iraq, located 140 kilometers (87 mi) northwest of Baghdad and 220 kilometers (140 mi) southeast of Mosul on the Tigris River. It is the administrative center of the Saladin Governorate. In 2012, it had a population of approximately 160,000. Tikrit is widely regarded as the cultural capital of Iraqi Sunni Arabs, with control of the city carrying symbolic weight due to its former prestige.

The inner city is notable for also being a university town as it is frequented by students of the city's major university, the University of Tikrit which attracts talent from around Iraq.

Originally created as a fort during the Assyrian empire, Tikrit was the birthplace of Muslim military leader Saladin. Many Iraqi government officials during the Ba'athist period (1968–2003) were from Tikrit; former president Saddam Hussein was born in the village of Al-Awja, 13 km south of the city.

Following the 2003 invasion of Iraq by a United States-led coalition, Tikrit was one of the cities in Iraq's "Sunni Triangle" which were core to an anti-coalition insurgency by Sunni militants—notably, the Islamic State of Iraq (ISI). In 2014, the Islamic State of Iraq and the Levant (ISIL), ISI's successor, captured the city, and massacred 1,700 cadets of the Iraqi Armed Forces there. It was the second-deadliest terrorist attack in history. During the Second Battle of Tikrit in 2015, Iraqi government forces regained control of the city, while 28,000 civilians were displaced. Tikrit has been peaceful since then.

== History ==
=== Bronze Age to Hellenistic period ===
As a fort along the Tigris (Akkadian: Idiqlat), the city is first mentioned in the Fall of Assyria Chronicle as being a refuge for the Babylonian king Nabopolassar after his failed assault on the city of Assur in 615 BC.

Tikrit is usually identified as the Hellenistic settlement Birtha.

=== Christian presence ===
Until the 6th century, Christianity within the Sasanian Empire was predominantly dyophysite under the Church of the East, however, as a result of Miaphysite missionary work, Tikrit became a major Miaphysite (Oriental Orthodox Christian) center under its first bishop, Ahudemmeh, in 559. Under Marutha of Tikrit, the bishopric was elevated into a maphrianate and the city's ecclesiastical jurisdiction extended as far as Central Asia.

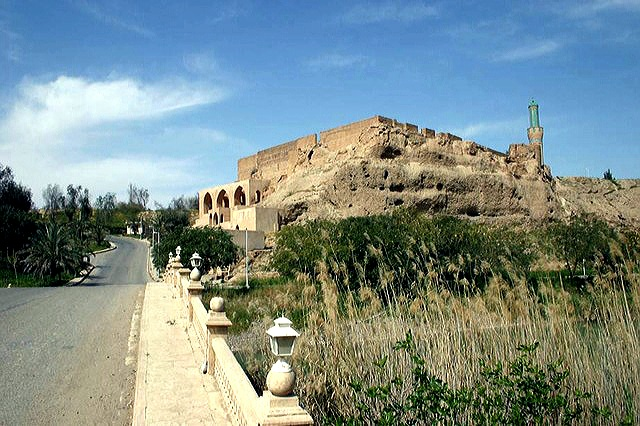
Ruins of the "Green Church"

The city remained predominantly Syriac Orthodox Christian in the early centuries of Islamic rule and gained fame as an important center of Syriac and Christian Arab literature. Some famous Christians from the city include its bishop Quriaqos of Tagrit who ascended to become the patriarch of the Syriac Orthodox Church, theologians Abu Zakariya Denha and Abu Raita, and translator Yahya ibn Adi.

From the ninth century Christians of Tikrit began to migrate northwards due to restrictive measures taken by some Muslim governors. Many settled in Mosul and villages in the Nineveh Plains, especially Bakhdida, as well as Tur Abdin. The Christian community received a setback when the governor ordered the destruction of the main cathedral known popularly as the "Green Church" in 1089. The maphrian and some of the Christians of Tikrit had to relocate to the Mor Mattai Monastery, where a village named Merki was established in the valley below the monastery. A later governor permitted the reconstruction of the cathedral. However, instability returned and the maphrian moved indefinitely to Mosul in 1156.

Regardless, the city remained an important center of the Syriac Orthodox Church until its destruction by Timur in the late 14th century. A Christian presence has not existed in the city since the 17th century.

=== Byzantine to Ottoman periods ===
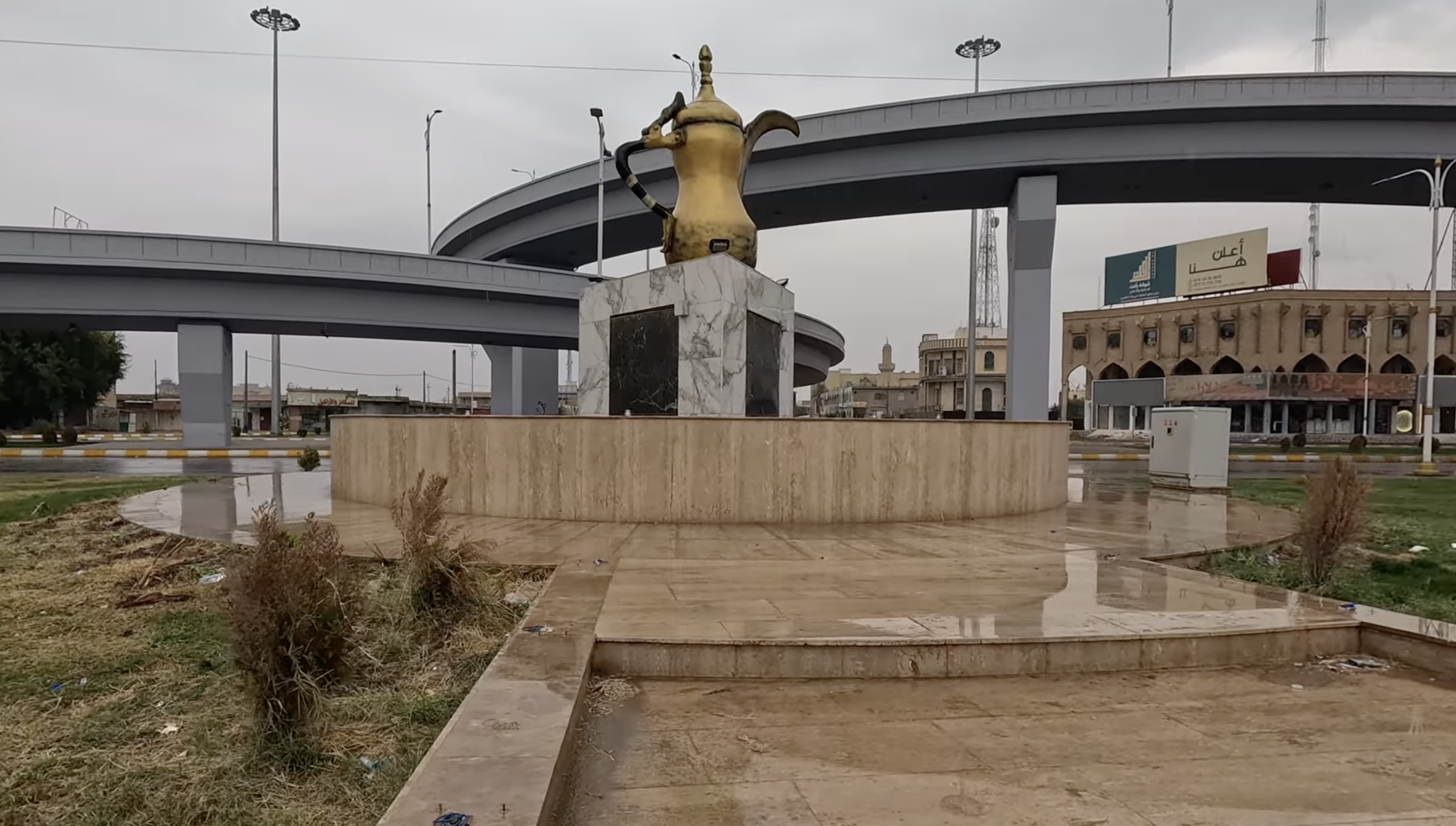
Monument in Tikrit, highlighting the city's Bedouin heritage

The town was also home to the Arab Christian tribe of Iyad. The Arabs of the town secretly assisted the Muslims when they besieged the town. The Muslims entered Tikrit in 640; it was from then considered as part of the Jazira province. It was later regarded as belonging to Iraq by Arab geographers.

Tikrit was briefly controlled by the Nizari Ismailis. After a failed Seljuk campaign against it, the Nizaris handed it over to the local Shia Arabs there.

The Arab Uqaylid dynasty took hold of Tikrit in 1036.

Saladin was born there around 1138. The modern province of which Tikrit is the capital is named after him.

The city was devastated in 1393 by Timur. During the Ottoman period Tikrit existed as a small settlement that belonged to the Rakka Eyalet; its population never exceeded 4,000–5,000.

=== World War I and Ba'ath Party connections ===
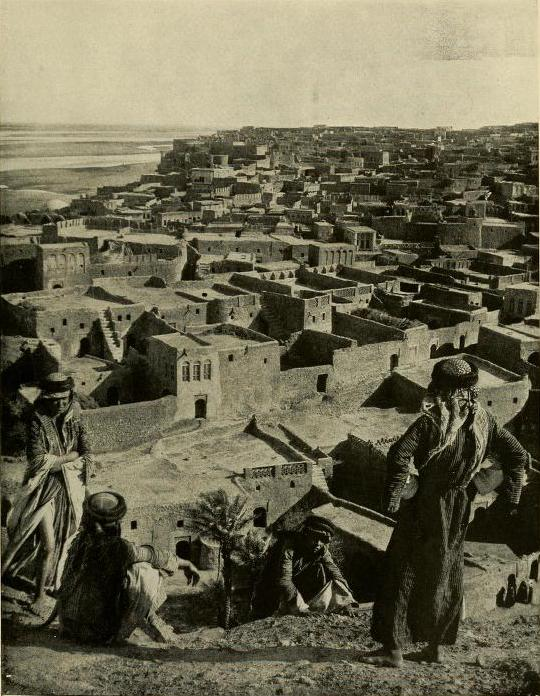
View of Tikrit ca. 1914

The city is Hussein's birthplace. Many senior members of the Iraqi government during his rule were drawn from Hussein's own Tikriti tribe, the Al-Bu Nasir, as were members of his Iraqi Republican Guard, chiefly because Hussein apparently felt that he was most able to rely on relatives and allies of his family. The Tikriti domination of the Iraqi government became something of an embarrassment to Hussein and, in 1977, he abolished the use of surnames in Iraq to conceal the fact that so many of his key supporters bore the same surname, al-Tikriti (as did Hussein himself). Hussein was buried near Tikrit in his hometown of Al-Awja following his hanging on 30 December 2006.

==== Iraq War of 2003 and aftermath ====
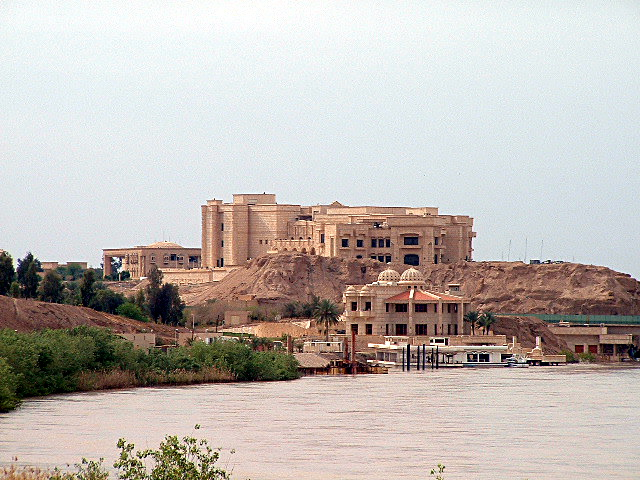
Saddam Hussein's palace in Tikrit in 2003, after it was abandoned

In the opening weeks of the 2003 US-led invasion, many observers speculated that Hussein would return to Tikrit as his "last stronghold". The city was subjected to intense aerial bombardment meant to throw Hussein's elite Republican Guard troops out of the city. On 13 April 2003, several thousand U.S. Marines and other coalition members aboard 300 armored vehicles converged on the town, meeting little or no resistance. With the fall of Tikrit, U.S. Army Major General Stanley McChrystal said, "I would anticipate that the major combat operations are over."

After the fall of Baghdad, Hussein was in and around Tikrit. He was hidden by relatives and supporters for about six months. During his final period in hiding, he lived in a small hole just outside the town of ad-Dawr, 15 kilometres (9 mi) south of Tikrit on the eastern bank of the Tigris, a few kilometers southeast of Al-Awja (although the story of having been found in a hole specifically has come into question as being a piece of war-time propaganda).

On 18 April 2010, Abu Hamza al-Muhajir and Abu Omar al-Baghdadi were killed in a raid 10 km (6 mi) southwest of Tikrit in a safe house.

==== ISIL insurgence (2011-15) ====
The Islamic State of Iraq launched an attack on 29 March 2011 that killed 65 people and wounded over 100. Reuters news agency included the attack in its list of deadliest attacks in 2011.

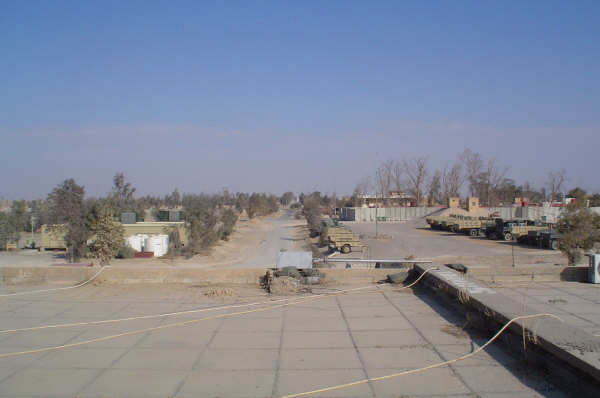
Tikrit Air Academy (formerly COB Speicher), site of the Camp Speicher massacre by the Islamic State

On 11 June 2014, during the Northern Iraq offensive, the Islamic State of Iraq and the Levant (IS) took control of the city. Hours later, the Iraqi Army made an attempt to recapture the city, which resulted in heavy fighting. On 12 June, IS executed at least 1,566 Iraqi Air Force cadets from Camp Speicher at Tikrit. At the time of the attack there were between 4,000 and 11,000 unarmed cadets in the camp. The Iraqi government blamed the massacre on both IS and members of the Arab Socialist Ba'ath Party – Iraq Region. By July 2014, government forces had withdrawn from Tikrit.

On 25 September 2014, Islamist militants destroyed the Assyrian Church there that dated back to 700 AD. The historic Al-Arba'een Mosque was detonated as well, damaging the cemetery surrounding it.

In March 2015, the Iraqi Army along with the Hashd Shaabi popular forces launched an operation to retake Tikrit from IS. On 31 March, the Iraqi government claimed the city had been recaptured by the Iraqi Army with the help of Shia militias.

== Notable people ==
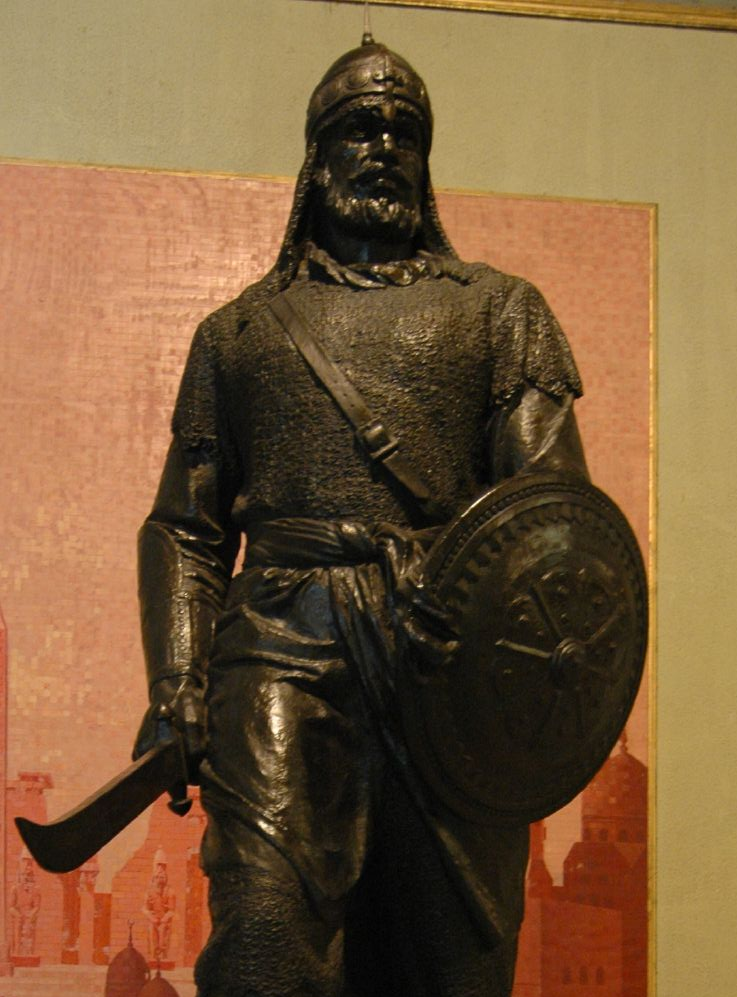
Modern sculpture of Saladin in the Egyptian Military museum in Cairo

- Saladin (1137 – 1193), was the founder of the Ayyubid dynasty who recaptured Jerusalem
- Saddam Hussein (1937 - 2006), President of Iraq from 1979 until 9 April 2003
- Barzan al-Tikriti (1951 – 2007), one of three half-brothers of Saddam Hussein, and a leader of the Mukhabarat
- Ali Hassan al Majid (1941 – 2010), an Iraqi politician and military commander who was Saddam's defence minister, interior minister and chief of the Iraqi Intelligence Service
- Ahmed Hassan al-Bakr (1914 – 1982), Iraqi politician who served as the president of Iraq, from 17 July 1968 to 16 July 1979
- Hardan al-Tikriti, Iraqi military officer and politician

== Geography ==
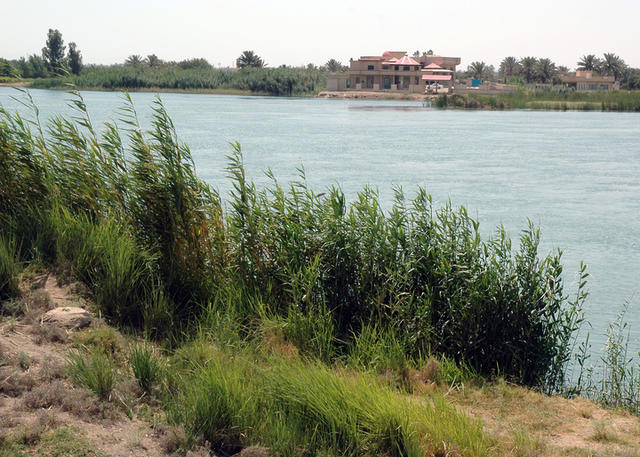
The Tigris River flows in front of a residence north of Tikrit

Tikrit is about 160 kilometers (99 mi) north of Baghdad on the Tigris River.

The city is located within the semi-undulating area. It penetrates the branch and valleys and ends with very sloping slopes towards the Tigris River, with a height ranging between 45–50 meters.

== Culture and community ==
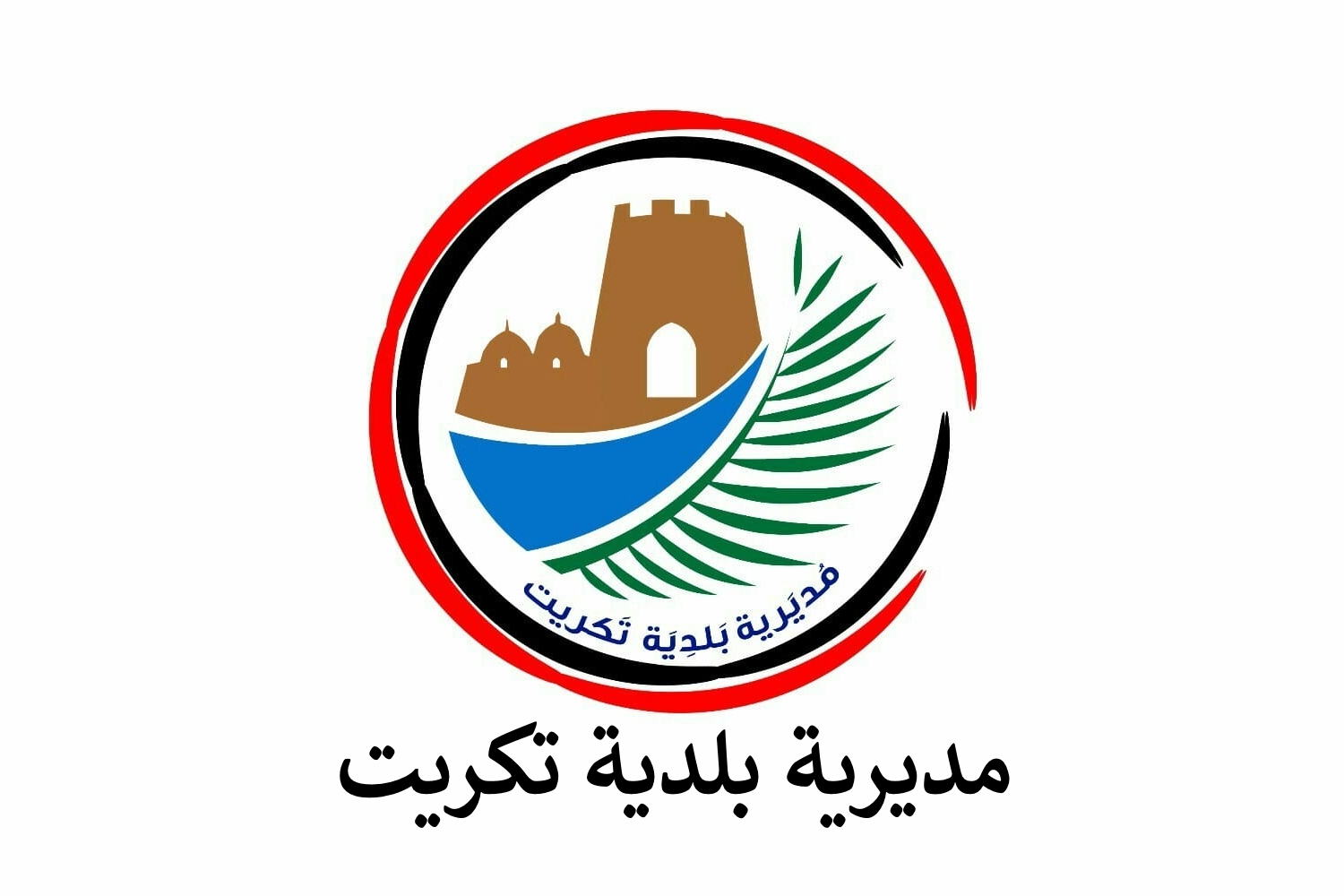
Flag of the Tikrit Municipality Directorate

The Tikrit Museum was damaged during the 2003 Iraq War.

The University of Tikrit was established in 1987 and is one of the largest universities in Iraq.

Tikrit Stadium is a multi-use facility used mostly for football matches and serves as the home stadium of Salah ad Din FC. It holds 10,000 people. There is also a new world-class stadium that meets FIFA standards with a capacity of 30,000 seats being built in Tikrit.

== Airports ==
The city of Tikrit has two small airports; Tikrit East Airport and Tikrit South Airport.

== Tikrit railway station ==
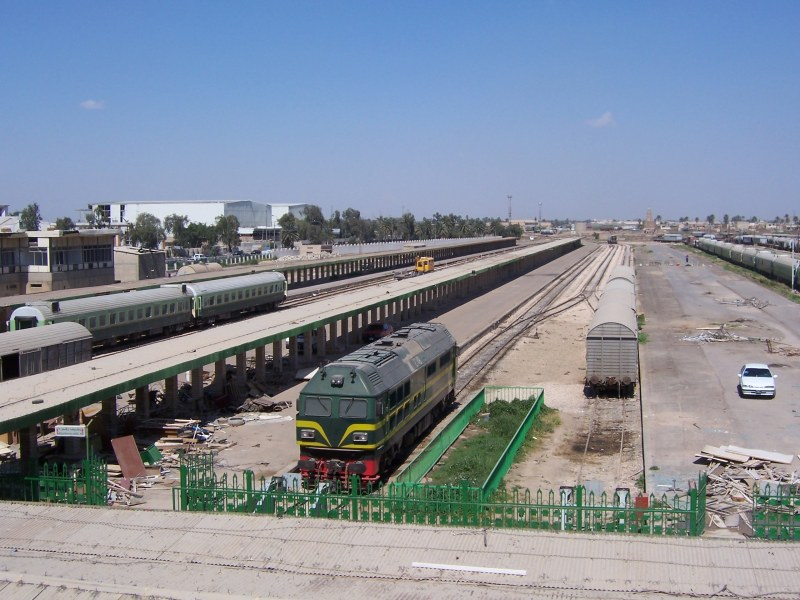
Trains pictured stationed heading towards Tikrit railway station, a former passenger service of the Iraqi Republic Railways Northern Line

Tikrit railway station is a former railway station located on the western side of Tikrit, Iraq. The station was originally built during the Ottoman period with German involvement as part of the development of the Baghdad Railway, a railway project constructed with significant Imperial German engineering and investment. The building was later expanded and modernized during the Ba'athist era. During the 1980s, it operated as a regular passenger station on the Iraqi Republic Railways (IRR) Northern Line, providing services between Tikrit, Baghdad and northern Iraqi cities such as Mosul.

Although the station building, railway infrastructure and former trains remain at the site, they are no longer in active use due to the decline of Iraq's railway network following decades of conflict and damage.

== Military facilities ==
The Iraqi Air Force has had several air bases at Tikrit: the Tikrit South Air Base, the Tikrit East Air Base and Al Sahra Airfield (Tikrit Air Academy, formerly Camp Speicher).

== Gallery ==
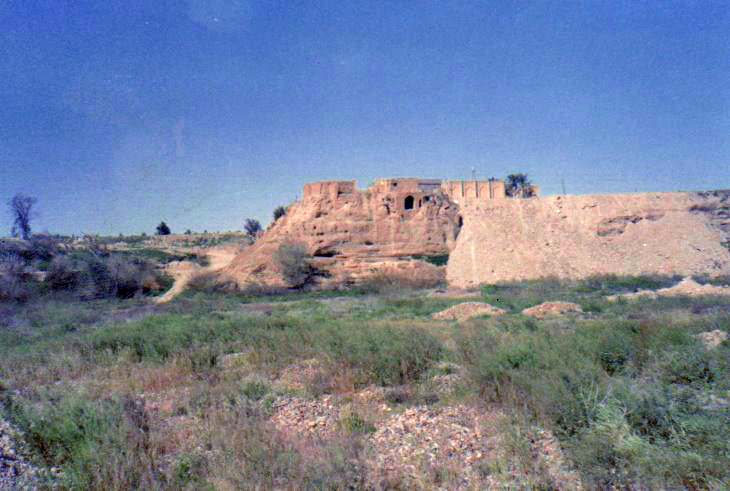
Tikrit Old Town

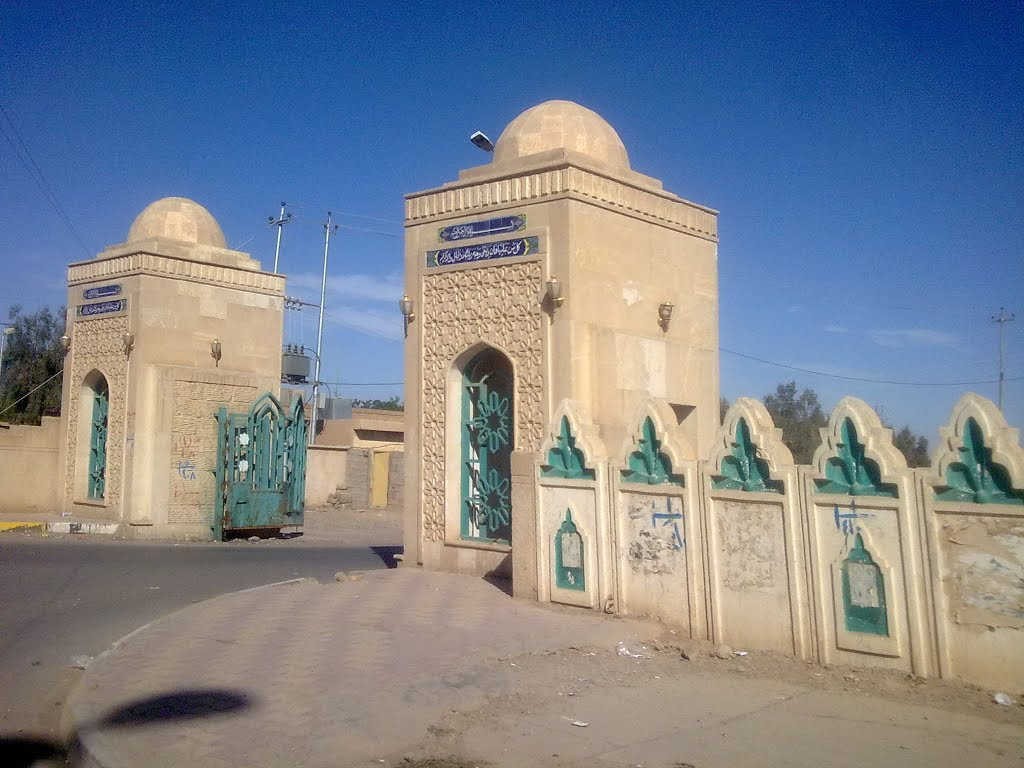
Tikrit Old Town

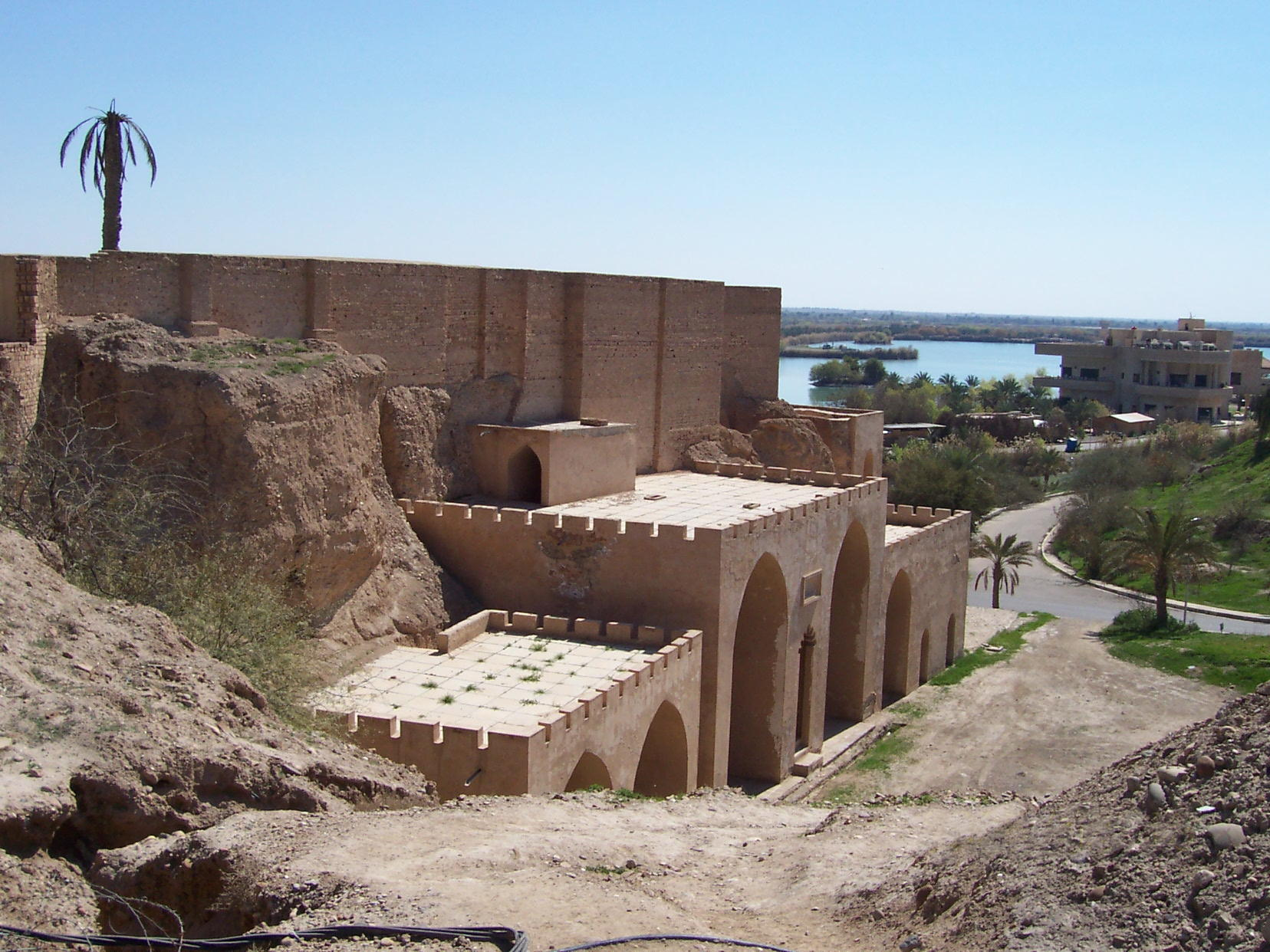
Modern-day view of the Monastery at Tikrit
