= Camp Speicher =

Military air installation in Northern Iraq

Tikrit Air Academy Al Sahra Airfield
- Near Tikrit, Saladin Governorate in Iraq

Site information
- Owner: Ministry of Defence
- Operator: Iraqi Air Force

Location
- Shown within Iraq
- Coordinates: 34°40′39″N 043°33′02″E

Site history
- Built: 1973
- In use: 1973–present

Airfield information
- Elevation: 130 metres (427 ft) AMSL
Runways
Direction	Length and surface
14/32	3,120 metres (10,236 ft) Asphalt

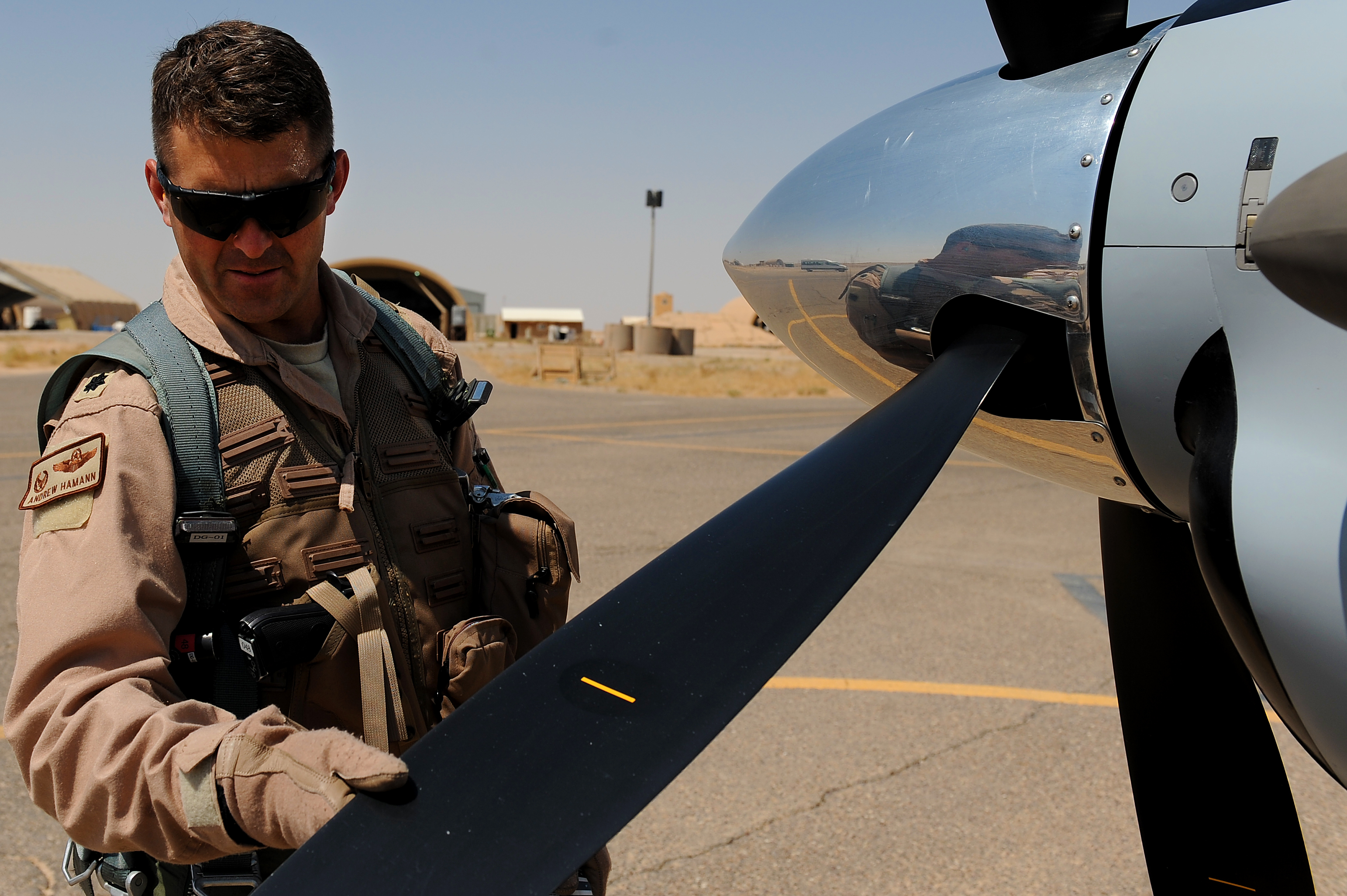
Lt. Col. Hamann, 52nd Expeditionary Flying Training Squadron commander, performs a preflight visual inspection at Camp Speicher, Sept. 4, 2011

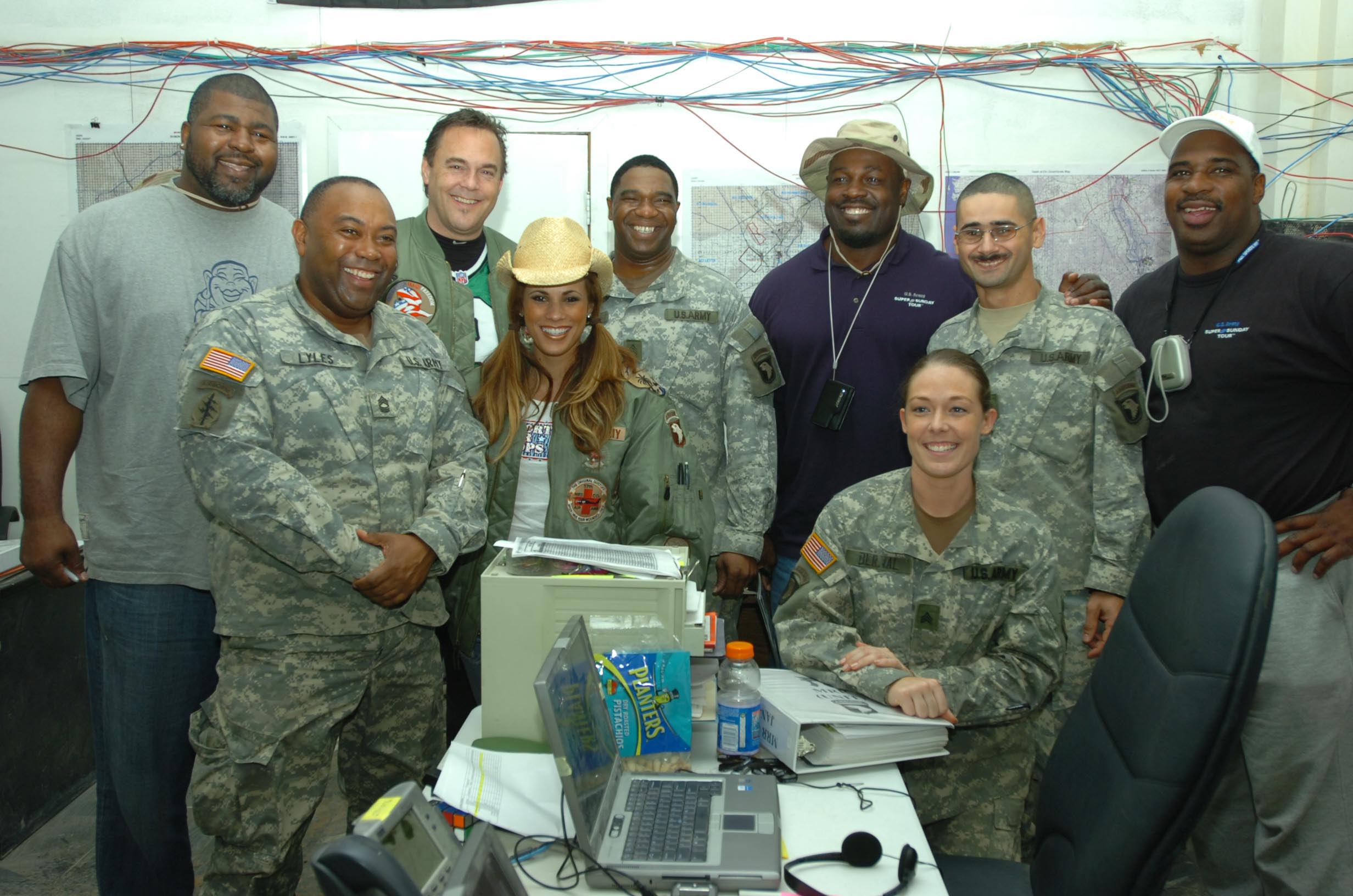
NFL players at FOB Speicher, Feb. 6, 2006

Majid al Tamimi Airbase, officially known as the Tikrit Air Academy and formerly as Al Sahra Airfield (under Saddam Hussein) is an air installation near Tikrit in northern Iraq. The installation is approximately 170 kilometers (105 mi) north of Baghdad and 11 kilometers (6.8 mi) west of the Tigris River. Prior to 2003, Al Sahra Airfield was the main base of the Iraqi Air Force Air Academy. The Marines from Task Force Tripoli captured the base from the Iraqi Army during the 2003 U.S. invasion of Iraq and turned it over to the United States Army who used it as the headquarters of the United States Division–North (USD-N, formerly Multinational Division, North, (MND-N)). The airfield is served by two main runways measuring 9,600 feet (2,900 m) long with a shorter runway measuring 7,200-foot (2,200 m). The Americans named the airfield after Captain Michael Scott Speicher, a United States Navy pilot who was killed in action in Iraq during the Gulf War.

== Early history ==
The base was one of several Iraqi Air Force airfields in the mid-1970s which were re-built under project "Super-Base" in response to the experiences from Arab–Israeli wars in 1967 and 1973.

== American presence (2003–2011) ==
=== Overview ===
During the start of the Iraq War in 2003, the main runway and some taxiways were cut by bomb hits, and the large main hangar structure was destroyed. The remains of the other large hangar next to it burned down in a large fire in July 2003. The original unit to take control of the base was the Quick Reaction Force platoon of the 704th Division Support Battalion, 4th Infantry Division, who received the hand off from the Marines. Then to Alpha Co., 14th Engineer BN, 555th Engineer Group, 1-10th Cavalry of the 4th Infantry Division. The base was then handed over to the 4th Aviation Brigade of the 4th Infantry Division in the second week of the war.

The Americans originally christened the base Forward Logistics Base (FLB) Sycamore, but the name was later changed to Forward Operating Base Speicher and then Contingency Operating Base Speicher. The name was changed in honor of Scott Speicher, an American pilot who was shot down in 1991 during the Gulf War.

American soldiers, civilians, and contractors had access to a variety of amenities over the course of the American presence at the base. The base had a large Post Exchange (PX), as well as several American fast food restaurants, including Subway, Burger King, and Pizza Hut.

=== Units ===
==== Aviation ====
- 4th Infantry Division – Combat Aviation Brigade – 4th Aviation Regiment – 1st Battalion (Attack/Reconnaissance) – Boeing AH-64 Apaches. 8/229 Attack Helicopter Battalion (OIF III).
- 4th Infantry Division – Combat Aviation Brigade – 4th Aviation Regiment – 2d Battalion (General Support) – Boeing CH-47 Chinooks.
- 1st Combat Aviation Brigade – 1st Infantry Division – 1st Attack Reconnaissance Battalion [Boeing AH-64A Apaches

==== Ground units ====
Units that have been based at COB Speicher include:

Unknown

- 1st Battalion, 5th US Cavalry, 2nd Brigade Combat Team, 1st Cavalry Division
- 42nd Infantry Division (Mechanized)* 4th Infantry Division (Mechanized)
- 13th Corps Support Command
- B Co. 3/58th Aviation Battalion (Pathfinders)
- C Btry 1/44 Air Defense Artillery (Red Tight)
- 18th Airborne corp. 403rd CTC.
- 287th Transportation Company (HET)
- 528th Navy Petroleum, Oil and Lubricant Supply Company (528 NAVPOLSUPCo) (NAVELSF Fwd B) (Sand Squids)
- 50th Main Support Battalion; Company B, 76th Infantry Brigade Combat Team
- 434th Main Support Battalion, 505th Parachute Infantry Regiment, HHC
- Company A and Company B, 136th Signal Battalion (Texas Army National Guard)
- Company D, 111th Signal Battalion (South Carolina Army National Guard), HHC
- Company B, Company D, 57th Signal Battalion, 141st Medical Company (GA)
- Connecticut Army National Guard unit, Combat Aviation Brigade, 10th Mountain Division, 555th Maneuver Enhancement Brigade, 232d CSB and others.
- 743rd Maintenance Company Florida National Guard.
- 164th Expeditionary Airlift Squadron from the Ohio Air Guard.

2003

- 101st Airborne Division (Air Assault)
- 1058th Transportation Company (Massachusetts Army National Guard)
- The 1404th Transportation Company (PLS) from the Arizona Army National Guard was stationed there in 2003 under the 4th Infantry Division,
- 300th Quartermaster Company from the United States Army Reserved based out of Peru, Illinois, & stationed there from 2003–2004 under the 4th Infantry Division.
- 64th Corps Support Group from Fort Hood, TX was stationed there from April 2003 to April 2004 under the 4th Infantry Division.
- 704th Division Support Battalion from Fort Hood, TX. Stationed April 2003 through April 2004 under the 4th Infantry Division. HQ company was quartered in the control tower.
- 28th Combat Support Hospital from the United States Army Ft. Bragg, NC
- 553rd Corps Support Battalion from Fort Hood, TX was stationed there from April 2003 to April 2004 under the 4th Infantry Division.
- 846th Transportation Unit (North Carolina Army Reserve – Salisbury, NC) stationed in 2003 under numerous divisions. End of deployment under 4th Infantry Division.
- A Co 14th Engineer Battalion, 555 Engineer Group, 4th ID Ft Lewis, WA
- 244th ECB(H) Denver Colorado, 555 Engineer Brigade, 4th ID
- 743rd (Non-Divisional) Direct Support Maintenance Company, Florida Army National Guard, Ft. Lauderdale FL
- 475th QM Co.; Beaver Falls, Pennsylvania; From April 2003 to April 2004
- 140th QM Co. from Ft. Totten, NY. July 2003 – Feb. 2004
- 229th CSE Engineer Co WI Army National Guard Prairie du Chien/Platteville, WI (stationed in 2003 under numerous major commands. Ended deployment under 4th Infantry Division)

2004

- 1st Infantry Division (Mechanized)
- HHC 264th ENG GP, Wisconsin Army National Guard (WIARNG) design and coordinate execution of all 1ID DIVENG construction projects and roadside security operations of subordinate units, 141 ECB NDARNG and 216 ECB OHARNG.
- HHC and B Co 141st ECB North Dakota Army National Guard performing Trailblazer operations through Feb 2005
- 323rd Maintenance Company (Jan 2004 – Jan 2005) (U.S. Army Reserve, Fort Devens MA)
- 167th Corps Support Group/94th RRC
- 12th Chemical Company, 701st MSB, 1st Infantry Division
- 1st Infantry Division supported transportation and logistic units based at FOB Speicher supported US units in Kirkuk, Mosul and 5 subordinate bases.
- The 467th Engineer Battalion (HHC and B Company) from the U.S. Army Reserve were stationed here OPCON to both the 42nd Infantry Division and 101 ABN Div between 2004 and 2005
- 313th Medical Company of the Nebraska National Guard.
- A Co. 1/140th Aviation Battalion, California National Guard
- B Co. 1/140th Aviation Battalion, California National Guard
- C Co. 1/140th Aviation Battalion (Ghostwarriors), California National Guard
- Headquarters and Headquarters Detachment 835th Corps Support Battalion, Missouri Army National Guard
- The 232nd Corps Support Battalion of the Illinois Army National Guard, 323rd Maintenance Company (DS), 454th Transportation Company from the U.S. Army Reserve, the 283rd Transportation Company of the U.S. Army Reserve, Navy Reserve 528 NAVPOLSUPCo, and elements of USAF 1058th Air Expeditionary Force Transportation Company of the 13th Corps Support Command of the Multi-National Corps, Iraq.
- 216th Engineer Combat Battalion (Heavy) Ohio Army National Guard performed horizontal and vertical engineer missions throughout the 1st I.D. area of operations.
- Elements of the Kentucky National Guard (including the 149th Infantry Brigade, 2113th Transportation Company) were stationed at FOB Speicher from 2004 though 2006.
- 88th RRC was stationed here from 2004 to 2005.
- 63rd Ordnance Company (PLS/MOADS) a conventional ammunition company from Fort Lewis Washington maintained accountability of all ammunition at the Ammunition Holding Area while providing security at the main gate from February–April 2004 and was quartered in the old Iraqi Air Force Officers Club.

2005

- 42d Infantry Division (Division Support Command)
- 50th Main Support Battalion (New Jersey ARNG)
- 126th TC (PLS)
- HHS/6-27 FA (HET) was stationed at COB Speicher from October 2005 to September 2006 and conducted a handover with the 1461st CBT HET of the Michigan Army National Guard was stationed here
- 223rd Medical Detachment (Preventive Medicine) was stationed at COB Speicher (under the Command of Major James Flanagan) from September 2005 to September 2006, under the 61st Multifunctional Medical Battalion in Balad, Iraq with its higher Headquarters being 30th Medical Brigade
- 366th MP Detachment (CID) was stationed at COB Speicher from September 2005 until December 2005. Prior to that, the 366th was located at FOB Danger from December 2004. The move was facilitated by the fact that FOB Danger was turned over to the Iraqi Army.

2006

- HHS/6-27 FA (HET) provided support for the troop surge in the stabilization of Iraq during 2006–2007.
- Task Force ODIN (21st Cavalry Brigade from Fort Hood, Texas) occupied the airfield and supported ground units needed during the remainder of the conflict. Task Force Odin remained on this base for the remainder of the war. ODIN was for Observe, Detect, Identify, and Neutralize.
- 25th Infantry Division (United States)|25th Infantry Division (Light) 2006–2007
- 505th Engineer Battalion (Combat Heavy ) HHQ Company, March 2006 – Oct 2006.
- 370th Transportation Company (PLS), September 2006 – January 2007.

2007

- In 2007–2008, the 111th Engineer Brigade of the West Virginia Army National Guard was headquartered within the "Badgerville" section of COB Speicher. Serving under the 25ID and later the 1AD, the 111th Engineer Brigade conducted engineer missions throughout Multi-National Division North (MND-N).
- Task Force Odin (21st Cavalry Brigade from Fort Hood, Texas)

2008

- 10th Mountain Division, 2-10th Assault Helicopter Battalion. October 2008 Start.
- 10th Mountain Division, 277th Aviation Battalion. October 2008 Start.
- Task Force Odin (21st Cavalry Brigade from Fort Hood, Texas)
- 76th Infantry Brigade

(Indiana Army National Guard Unit)

2009

- 3rd Infantry Division (Mechanized), 2009–2010.
- 4th Infantry Brigade Combat Team, 1st Infantry Division, 2009–2010.
- 10th Mountain Division, 2-10th Assault Helicopter Battalion. October 2009 End.
- 10th Mountain Division, 277th Aviation Battalion. October 2009 End.
- 422 Civil Affairs BN
- 25th Infantry Division
- 264th Combat Sustainment Support BN, Fort Bragg, NC
- 2025th Transportation Company, Jacksonville, AL NG (HET) from July 2009 to May 2010.
- 1083rd Transportation Company, Camp Minden, LA NG from July 2009 to May 2010.
- 65th Engineer Battalion
- Task Force ODIN (21st Cavalry Brigade from Fort Hood, Texas) Task Force ODIN, whose name is an acronym for observe, detect, identify, and neutralize, is a United States Army aviation battalion created in August 2006 to conduct reconnaissance, surveillance and target acquisition (RSTA) operations to combat insurgent operators of improvised explosive devices in Iraq.
- 155th BCT (MSARNG)
- 363rd Military Police Company (Army Reserve Unit, Grafton, WV)
- 690th GA (Ground Ambulance) Medical Company (Ft. Benning, GA)

2010

- 220th Transportation Company (New Hampshire Army Reserve)
- Elements of the 3rd Squadron of the Tennessee National Guard's 278th Armored Cavalry Regiment were stationed at COB Speicher under the 13th Sustainment Command (Expeditionary) as convoy security units from February 2010 until July 2010.
- Task Force ODIN (21st Cavalry Brigade from Fort Hood, Texas)
- 256th Combat Support Hospital (Army Reserve Unit, Twinsburg, Ohio)

2011

- 275th Combat Sustainment Support Battalion (Virginia Reserve Unit)
- Task Force ODIN (21st Cavalry Brigade from Fort Hood, Texas)

The US Army left COB Speicher and handed it over to the Government of Iraq on 20 October 2011 as part of the general withdrawal of US Forces. Camp Speicher is currently used by the Iraqi Army and Air Force.

== 2014 massacre ==
By mid June 2014, Tikrit was overrun by the militant group Islamic State in Iraq and the Levant (ISIL). Iraqi Air Force cadets reported that many of the camp's officers fled as ISIS approached, and, as a result, several thousand Shia cadets and other personnel abandoned their uniforms and began to walk toward Baghdad. Several miles from the camp, they were confronted and taken prisoners by approximately fifty ISIL militants in armored vehicles. Following their capture, about 1,700 were killed in mass shooting executions. A video released by ISIL in July showed the executions done in several locations including shooting the cadets in trenches and then throwing the bodies in the River Tigris. In early September, corpses were seen floating on the surface. Very few managed to escape unharmed and survive.

Camp Speicher was contested throughout the summer of 2014. The Daily Telegraph reported in June that Speicher was at one point under the control of ISIL, but according to later accounts, ISIL never captured the airfield.

On 17 July, following the Iraqi Army's defeat in the First Battle of Tikrit, insurgents launched an assault on the camp, where an estimated 700 government soldiers and 150 Iranian or Iraqi Shia militiamen were besieged. The assault included snipers and suicide bombers and the militants quickly managed to reach the runway, at which point Iraqi special forces joined the battle. The base was bombarded and mortared all night. By the next morning, according to various sources, the final pocket of government troops had collapsed. At least 25–35 insurgents were also killed. Iraqi forces attempted to save the base's aircraft by flying them out, but according to ISIL 8–9 helicopters were destroyed on the ground or shot down, with several armored vehicles destroyed as well. The Iraqi Army denied the alleged capture of the base with soldiers from the front line reporting that Speicher was still under their control, with only three soldiers being killed, one helicopter destroyed and two damaged. A Tikrit resident also reported continued fighting around the base. Two days later, the military reported that Iraqi special forces had re-secured the base.

== See also ==
- List of airports in Iraq
- List of United States Military installations in Iraq
- United States Forces – Iraq
- Al Asad Airbase
