= Camp Speicher massacre =

2014 ISIL attack on an Iraqi military camp in Tikrit, Iraq

- Part of the Islamic State invasion of Iraq and the Persecution of Shias by the Islamic State
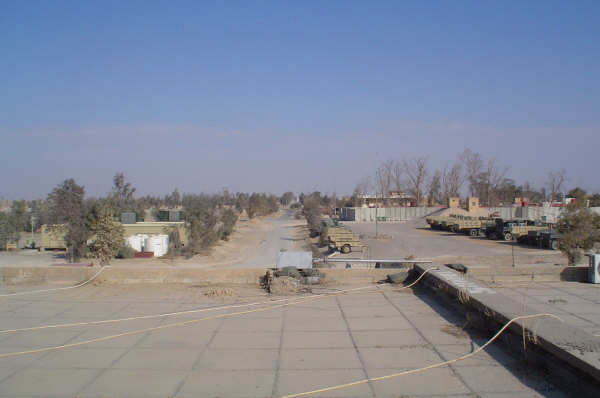
- Camp Speicher in 2005, when it was a United States military installation before being transferred to the Iraqi government in 2011

- Location within Iraq
- Location: 34°36′36″N 43°40′48″E; Tikrit, Iraq
- Date: 12 June 2014; 12 years ago
- Target: Cadets of the Iraqi Armed Forces
- Attack type: Sectarian cleansing via mass murder
- Deaths: 1,095–1,566
- Victim: Shia Muslims
- Perpetrator: Islamic State
- Motive: Anti-Shia sentiment

The Camp Speicher massacre was the mass killing of unarmed Shia cadets of the Iraqi Armed Forces by the Islamic State of Iraq and the Levant (ISIL), on 12 June 2014. It occurred in Tikrit, Iraq, which is near the cadets' military base, Camp Speicher. The confirmed death toll is between 1,095–1,566.

In 2013, ISIL was founded by Abu Bakr al-Baghdadi, and soon established an area of control in war-torn Syria. They then expanded their territory in Syria and Iraq, killing many captives who were members of opposing militaries. These executions were often recorded on video for IS' propaganda operations on social media, which were effective in recruiting new members. In Iraq, ISIL targeted members of the Iraqi government led by prime minister Nouri al-Maliki. ISIL launched a full-scale invasion of Iraq on 4 June 2014, and captured between 5,000 and 10,000 unarmed Iraqi cadets around Camp Speicher. Of those who were massacred, many of their executions were recorded for propaganda videos.

The Iraqi government took back territory from ISIL over the course of the 2013–2017 war in Iraq. As they captured ISIL fighters, dozens of perpetrators of the massacre were identified and executed. Al-Baghdadi died by suicide amidst an American operation in 2019.

== Background ==
=== Camp Speicher ===
Camp Speicher is a large military base located in Saladin Governorate, Iraq, approximately 10 kilometres (6 miles) northwest of Tikrit and 170 kilometres (105 miles) north of Baghdad, founded in 1973 by Saddam Hussein as an air base for the Iraqi Air Force. It was captured by the United States during the 2003 invasion of Iraq and was occupied by the United States Army for the remainder of the Iraq War. The United States handed over Camp Speicher to the Iraqi government in 2011, being recommissioned as an Iraqi Air Force base and a regional training facility for the Iraqi Armed Forces.

=== The Islamic State ===
The Islamic State's flag

In 2010, the Islamic State of Iraq, a militant organization and former al-Qaeda affiliate which was founded by Abu Musab al-Zarqawi and had been weakened by numerous military operations in the late 2000s, received a new leader, Abu Bakr al-Baghdadi. He led the organization's resurgence, fueled by Iraqi prime minister Nouri al-Maliki's policies; his Shia government was repressing Sunnis, which influenced many Sunnis in western Iraq to become anti-Shia extremists. After the Syrian civil war started between the Syrian government and various rebel groups in 2011, many of those rebels declared allegiance to al-Baghdadi.

In 2013, al-Baghdadi merged his forces in Iraq and Syria into the "Islamic State of Iraq and al-Sham" (ISIS), later shortened as the "Islamic State" (IS). IS soon founded an area of control within eastern Syria, and began enforcing a strict system of Islamic law. They used the captured city of Raqqa as its stronghold while expanding their territory. IS began a propaganda campaign on social media that often focused on their harsh treatment of their enemies, which was effective in recruiting Islamic extremists from across the world to be members. After capturing the Iraqi cities of Fallujah and Ramadi in early 2014, IS pushed northwards in Iraq, which the Iraqi government did not anticipate.

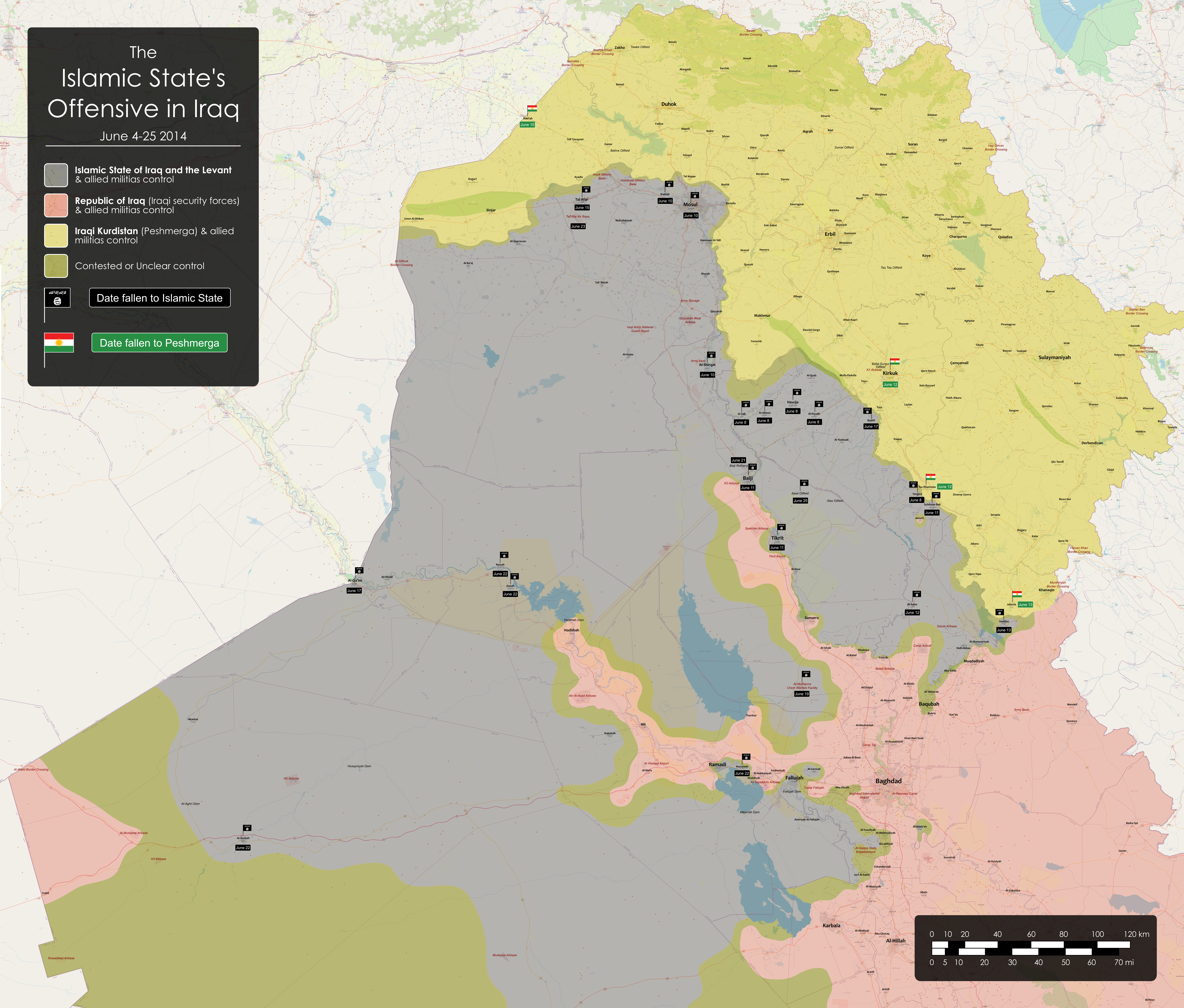
Map of ISIL' 2014 offensive in Iraq

On 4 June 2014, the full-scale IS invasion of Iraq was launched, which made rapid advances into northern Iraq, and Tikrit was captured on 11 June.

=== Surrounding of Camp Speicher ===
IS forces soon surrounded Camp Speicher, where at least 10,000 unarmed cadets of the Iraqi military were present and thrown into disarray. Many of the cadets fled from the base, some changing into their civilian clothes to avoid detection, but most were quickly captured.

Several survivors later testified that their senior officers in the camp had forced them to leave the camp. Hassan Khalil, one survivor, who managed to escape by pretending to be dead under another corpse and fleeing at night, said: "Our chief officers are the reason behind the killings. They forced us to leave Speicher. They assured us there was a safe passage, that it was guarded by the tribes, and told us not to wear uniforms." The Iraqi government and national television denied that story. They said the cadets forced their way out of the camps after the military had already dispatched special forces to the dangerous camps' area to secure them, and that they had been warned against leaving.

Four hundred cadets ordered to leave Camp Speicher before the attack were arrested by government forces, and are missing.

== Massacre ==
IS targeted Shia cadets in the massacre. Photos show masked IS fighters tying up the cadets and loading them up on trucks, with other photographs showing IS fighters killing dozens of the cadets with assault rifles while they are lying down. IS propaganda videos made for social media show them shooting at hundreds of men lined up in mass graves in the desert. Some cadets faked their death, covering themselves with blood and escaping at night.

IS released footage of the massacre as part of their propaganda video Upon the Prophetic Methodology. The cadets are seen being crammed into trucks, some of them wearing civilian clothes to hide their military uniforms. Most of them are lying on the ground, with their jeans stripped to reveal camouflage uniforms underneath. Some of the prisoners were forced to defame Iraq's prime minister, Nouri al-Maliki, while others were forced to shout "long live the Islamic State". Some of them were beaten to death with a rifle. The killing methods varied, from shooting the cadets one by one to shooting them while lying down many times to ensure death. Some cadets were shot and dumped into the Tigris river.

== Aftermath ==
On 25 August 2014, a mother of one of the massacre victims throws her headscarf at the Iraqi parliament speaker, Salim al-Jabouri

Peter Bouckaert, the emergencies director for Human Rights Watch (HRW), stated: "The photos and satellite images from Tikrit provide strong evidence of a horrible war crime that needs further investigation. [IS] and other abusive forces should know that the eyes of Iraqis and the world are watching".

The Iraqi government asserted that 57 members of the Arab Socialist Ba'ath Party had taken part in the massacre. Although pictures showed that every armed man was from IS, the government stated "Without any doubts and suspicion, all of these criminals are from the banned Ba'ath Party." The Minister of Defense, Sa'dun al-Dulaimi, stated that the massacre was not sectarian in nature. Although the spokesman of the Iraqi Armed Forces, Qasim Atta, stated that there were almost 11,000 cadets and soldiers missing from Camp Speicher; he also stated that thousands were executed in or near the presidential palaces, the al-Bu Agail region, and the Badoush prison by sectarian violence.

On the 2nd of September, more than 100 members of the families of the killed and missing cadets and soldiers broke into the Iraqi Parliament and hit three of the security guards. After a day, a session started in the parliament with the attendance of representatives of the families and Sa'dun al-Dulaimi, along with other military officials to discuss the massacre.

On 16 September, the Kurdish Asayish arrested four people suspected to be involved in the massacre in southern Kirkuk. An unnamed security source stated, "The operation was executed by relying on intelligence information to arrest them."

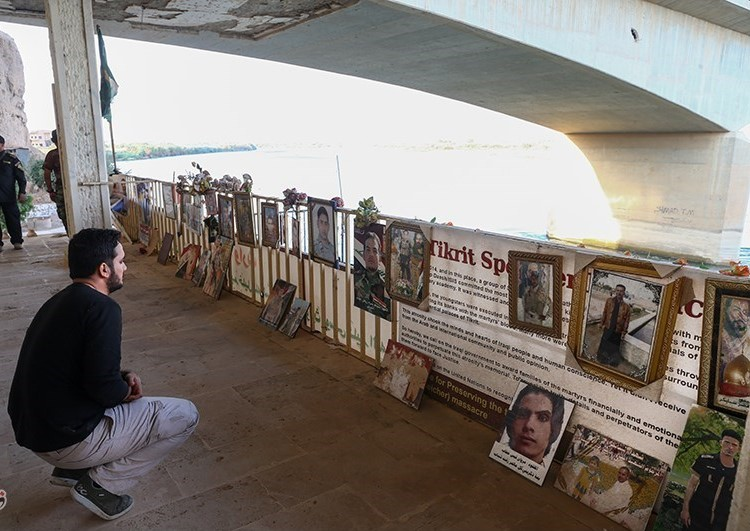
Memorial for the massacre's victims in Tikrit

On 18 September, the Iraqi Human Rights ministry stated that as of 17 September, the total number of missing soldiers and cadets was 1,095, denying the most popular figure of 1,700 soldiers having been killed. The ministry added, "The ministry relied in its statistics on spreading forms on the families of the missing people in Baghdad and the other governorate within its quest to document the crimes and violations that the terrorist group of the Islamic State is committing towards our people." The Iraqi government ordered them to pay 10 million Iraqi dinar (equivalent to US$8,600) to the families of the missing cadets.

=== Fall of the Islamic State ===
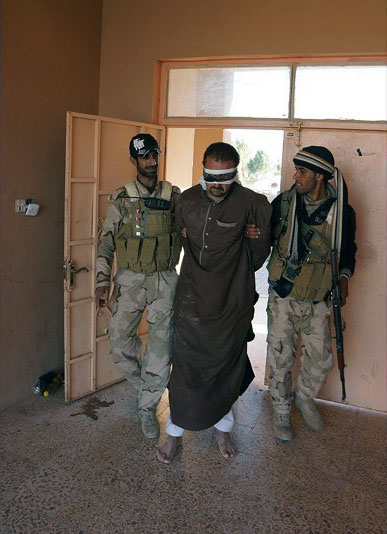
Captured ISIS terrorist in Tikrit, 6 April 2015

Following the Iraqi forces' victory over IS in Tikrit in early April 2015, mass graves containing some of the murdered cadets were located and the decomposed corpses began to be exhumed. Two identical twin brothers who were alleged perpetrators of the massacre were arrested in Forssa, Finland, in December 2015. The suspects were identified from IS propaganda videos in which the executions of 11 men took place. Police did not disclose whether the men had made applications for asylum in Finland.

On 13 December 2016, the 24-year-old twins were charged with murder and committing a war crime for allegedly killing unarmed cadets, as well as "aggravated assault with terrorist aims". They were acquitted by the Pirkanmaa District Court in May 2017. After the prosecution appealed the ruling, they were again acquitted by the Turku Court of Appeal in February 2020, due to lack of evidence of the brothers' involvement in the massacre. Some witnesses had testified that the brothers were not present, and it was also impossible to tell which of the brothers to accuse of any particular action, since they were identical twins.

In August 2016, 36 men were executed by hanging for their part in the massacre. On 6 September 2016, three mass graves were found by the Kata’ib al-Imam Ali brigade containing the remains of over 30 people killed in the massacre. In August 2017, 27 people were sentenced to death for their involvement in the massacre, and another 25 men were released due to lack of evidence. In May 2024, the Iraqi National Intelligence Service arrested three suspects who had fled the country, for their involvement in the massacre.

Abu Bakr al-Baghdadi died by suicide in October 2019 as U.S. forces raided his compound.

== See also ==
- 2016 Mosul massacre
- Hamam al-Alil massacre
- Mass executions in Islamic State-occupied Mosul
- Sinjar massacre
- Yazidi genocide
