= Al-Awja =

- Location in Iraq
- Coordinates: 34°31′59″N 43°43′59″E
- Country: Iraq
- Governorate: Salah ad Din
- District: Tikrit
- Settled: 1877

Population (2003)
  - Total: 29,000

Al-Awja (Arabic: العوجة, romanized: al-ʿAwjā) is a village 8 miles (13 km) south of Tikrit, Iraq on the western bank of the Tigris. It is mainly inhabited by Sunni Muslim Arabs.

The village is known for being the hometown and place of burial of former Iraqi President Saddam Hussein.

== History ==
Al-Awja is located between the edge of the plateau and the Tigris basin. Its name is derived from the river’s bends and twists there. Al-Awja is an agricultural land. It was mentioned in the Ottoman calendar in 1877 that it was a rich agricultural village. According to historians Jaber al-Tikriti and Bahjat al-Tikriti said in their article "Geographical and Historical Locations in Tikrit" published in the Encyclopedia of the City of Tikrit in 2001, the first maps of the region were drawn up in the first decades of this century, including topographical and other maps related to the ownership of lands and orchards in al-Awja. And most of the families of this clan reside in the village to supervise and manage their agricultural land.

An archaeological hill in the west of al-Awja contains pottery shards from the Islamic Golden Age. Ibrahim Fadhil al-Nasseri believed that this hill was the site of an extinct monastery called Dar al-Gharab, which was mentioned in heritage books.

=== After 2003 ===
When Saddam was captured by JSOC Task Force 121 and 4th Infantry Division during Operation Red Dawn, he was hidden only a few miles from ad-Dawr. Saddam Hussein was buried in this village before dawn on December 31, 2006, less than 24 hours after his execution took place.

During the fighting in the Second Battle of Tikrit, Saddam Hussein's tomb was levelled by ISIS. After Iraqi forces took control of the village, Shia militiamen of the Popular Mobilization Committee put its insignia around the village, including that of Major Iranian General Qasem Soleimani.
