= Ad-Dawr =

- Town
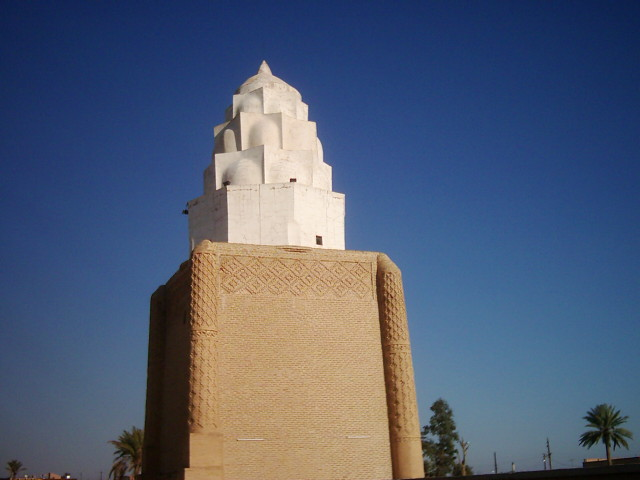

- Location within Iraq
- Coordinates: 34°27′27″N 43°47′54″E
- Country: Iraq
- Governorate: Saladin

Population (2018)
  - Total: 22,822
- Time zone: UTC+3 (Arabia Standard Time)

Ad-Dawr (Arabic: الدور) is a small agricultural town in Saladin Governorate, Iraq, near Tikrit. It includes a great number of people from four tribes, al-Shuwaykhat, al-Mawashet, al-Bu Haydar and al-Bu Mdallal. Al-Mawashet tribe is famous for supporting Saddam Hussein.

== History ==
=== Structures ===
Ad-Dawr is home to a housing complex called "Saad 14", which was built in the 1980s by Hyundai Engineering & Construction, a major South Korean construction company. The housing complex name was changed in the 1990s to "Ad-Dawr Housing Complex".

=== Iraq War ===
In May 2003, the 4th Battalion, 42nd Field Artillery, a part of the United States Army's 4th Infantry Division, along with the 534th Signal Company, established a Forward Operating Base just south of the town, called FOB Arrow. On May 15, 2003, troops from the U.S. Army's 4th Infantry Division raided the town, arresting more than 260 suspected Ba'ath Party supporters.

The vast majority were soon released but five Iraqi special security forces officers were reported captured, including two Iraqi army generals and a general from Saddam's security forces who had disguised himself as a shepherd.

On 13 August 2003, a U.S. Army soldier was killed near FOB Arrow when his vehicle hit an anti-tank mine.

An attack by insurgents near Ad-Dawr killed three American soldiers and injured three on 18 September 2003.

The 4th Battalion 42nd Field Artillery, along with 3rd Platoon 534th Signal Company, adopted Nasiba Primary School for Girls in the town and completed its refurbishment in November 2003.

On 13 December 2003, the 4th Infantry Division's 1st Brigade Combat Team conducted Operation Red Dawn and found Saddam Hussein hiding in a spider hole in front of a hut occupied by a man believed to be his former cook, Qais Namuk.

== Notables from ad-Dawr ==
- Awn al-Din ibn Hubayra
- Izzat Ibrahim al-Douri
- One of the most well-known Arab historical scholars, Professor-Doctor Abdul Aziz Al-Douri (b. 1918 – d. 2010), was a native of ad-Dawr; he served as the chancellor of Baghdad University during the 1960s.

== See also ==
- List of places in Iraq
- List of United States Military installations in Iraq
- Al-Awja

== Links and references ==
- Aldor map coordinates: 34°27′27″N 043°47′56″E
