= Shia Islam in Iraq =

Ethnoreligious group in Iraq

Iraqi Shias
شيعة العراق
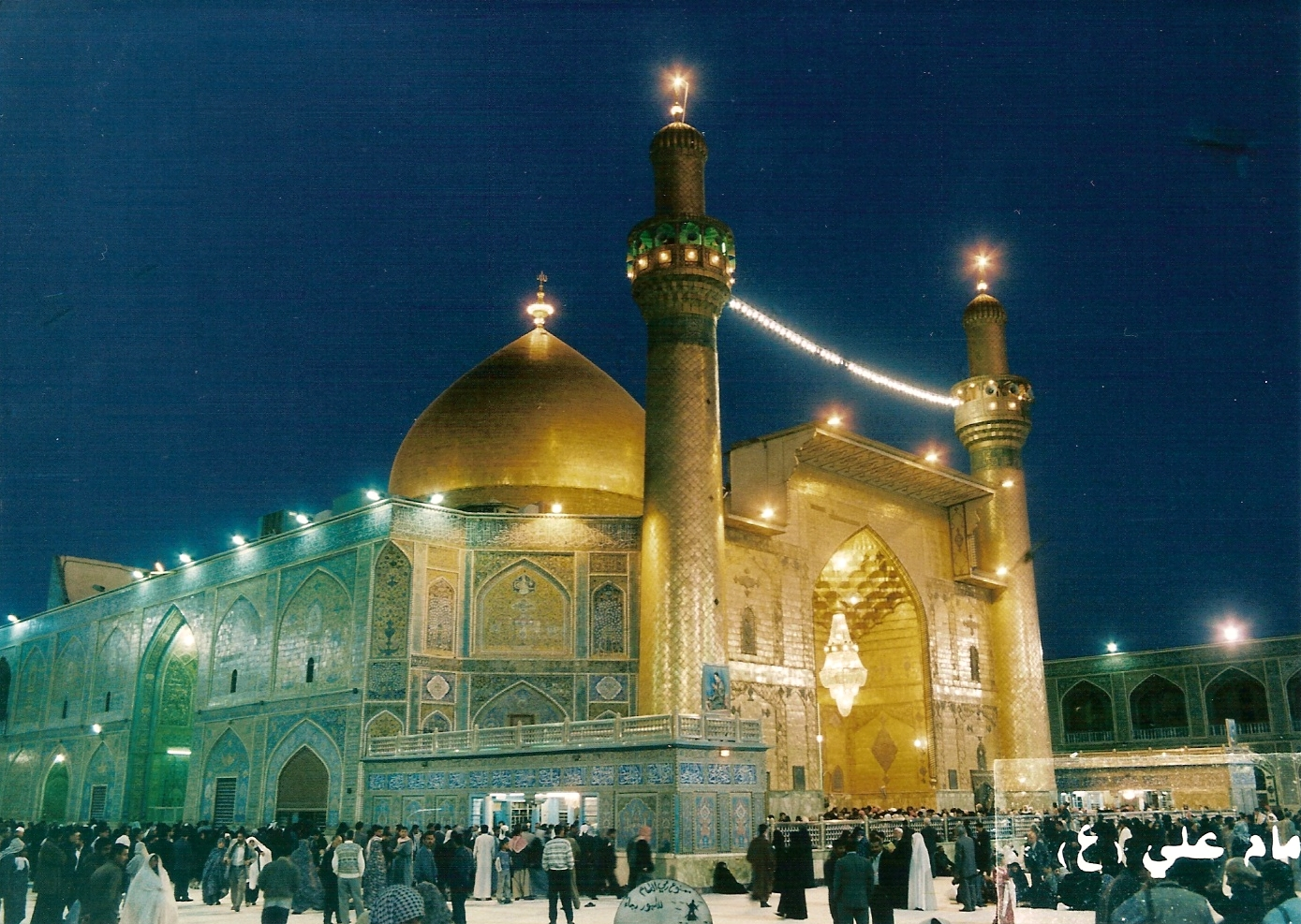
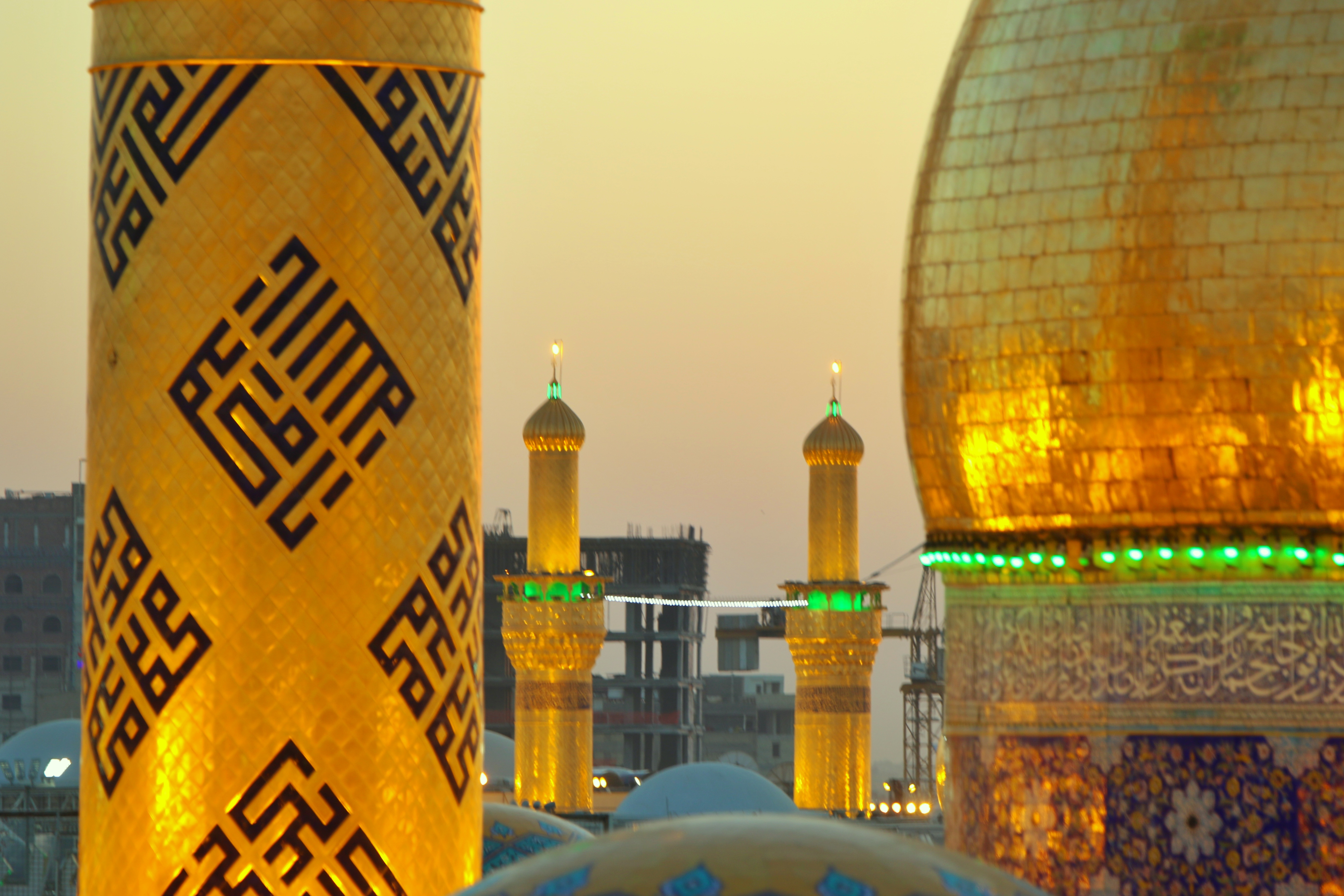
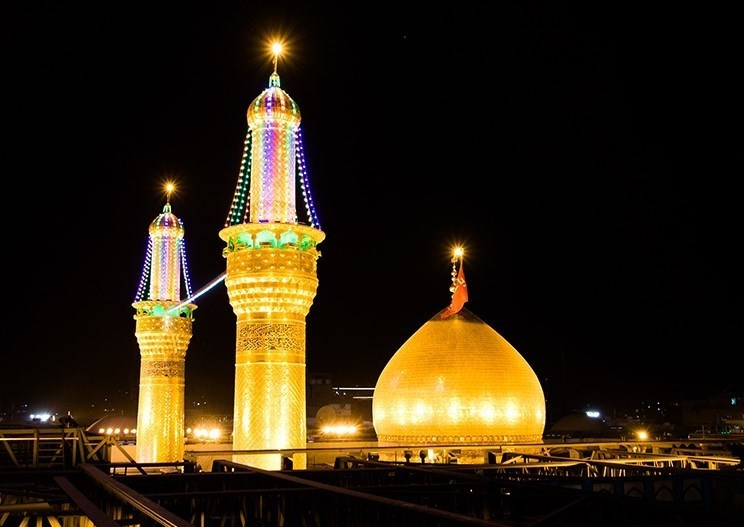
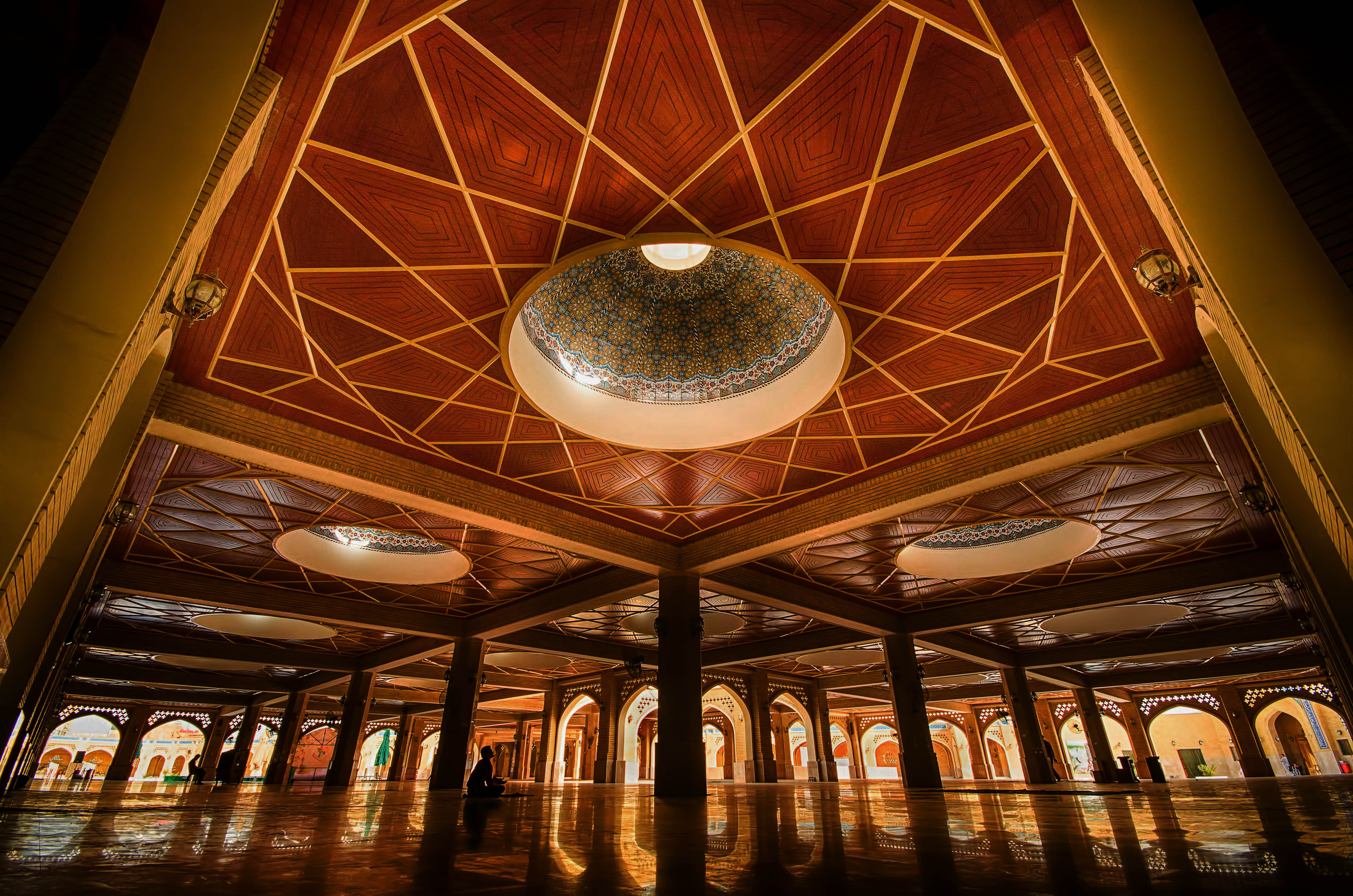
- Imam Ali Mosque Al-Abbas Mosque Imam Husayn Mosque Al-Sahlah Mosque

Total population
- 38%

Languages
- Majority: Arabic (Mesopotamian Arabic); Minority: Kurdish, Iraqi Turkmen, Persian

Religion
- Twelver Shia Islam — Usuli majority, Akhbari minority

Related ethnic groups
- Ahwazi Arabs, other Iraqis, Al-Ahsa Shia, Bahraini Shia Muslims, Kuwaiti Shia Muslims, Lebanese Shia Muslims, Iranian Shia Muslims, Azeri Shia Muslims

Shia in Iraq (Arabic: الشيعة في العراق) has a history going back to the times of Ali ibn Abi Talib who moved the capital of the Rashidun Caliphate from Medina to Kufa, two decades after the death of Muhammad. The Iraqi Shias are an ethnoreligious group of Iraq that constitute the largest minority group in Iraqi population. Their historical stronghold has been Lower Mesopotamia, historically known as Babylonia. In constrast to Iraqi Sunnis who are a majority that predominately live within in the West Iraq region and constitute 70% in higher estimate, which overlaps with the historical region of Upper Mesopotamia.

Iraqi Shias vary between religious, moderately religious and secular. Since Iraq is a predominantly tribal society, one's sectarian affiliation is often dependent on one's tribe regardless of personal religious convictions or lack thereof. The term 'Iraqi Shia' a socio-political and religious identifier, which also works as an ethnic identity. Since 2005, due to Muhasasah, an informally adopted political system of sect-based power sharing, sectarian stratification has occurred for political reasons. The vast majority of Iraqi Shias are ethnically Arab.

Shia are generally considered to constitute one of the largest minority of the Iraqi population with varying estimates over their percentages, such as a lower estimate reporting it to be between 25% and 30%, (Note: According to the United States Institute of Peace.) and a higher estimate ranging between 30% and 38% of the population of Iraq. (Note: According to the European Union Agency for Asylum.) Iraq is the location of the holy cities of Najaf and Karbala, in addition to Kadhimiya and Samarra, pilgrimage sites for millions of Shia. Modern Iraqi Shias follow the Twelver sect. Historically, there were followers of Isma'ilism among Musha'sha' Arabs, Zaydism among Kurds, and Ibrahimiyya among Turkmen, which all declined. Since 2010, the number of people identifying as atheists has increased, especially among the youth.

Najaf is the site of Ali's tomb, and Karbala is the site of the tomb of Muhammad's grandson, third Shia Imam Husayn ibn Ali. Najaf is also a center of Shia learning and seminaries. Two other holy sites for Twelver Shia in Iraq are the Al-Kadhimiya Mosque in Baghdad, which contains the tombs of the seventh and ninth Shia Imams (Mūsā al-Kādhim and Muhammad al-Jawad) and the Al-Askari Mosque in Samarra, which contains the tombs of the tenth and eleventh Shia Imams (Ali al-Hadi and Hasan al-‘Askarī).

Iraq is known as the center of Shia, with Najaf being the hub of Shia scholarship. After the U.S.-led invasion in 2003, widespread sectarian violence erupted between Shias and Sunnis in Iraq, which led to war in 2006–2008 and 2013–2017, with the latter one involving the Islamic State.

== History ==
=== 7th to 10th centuries ===
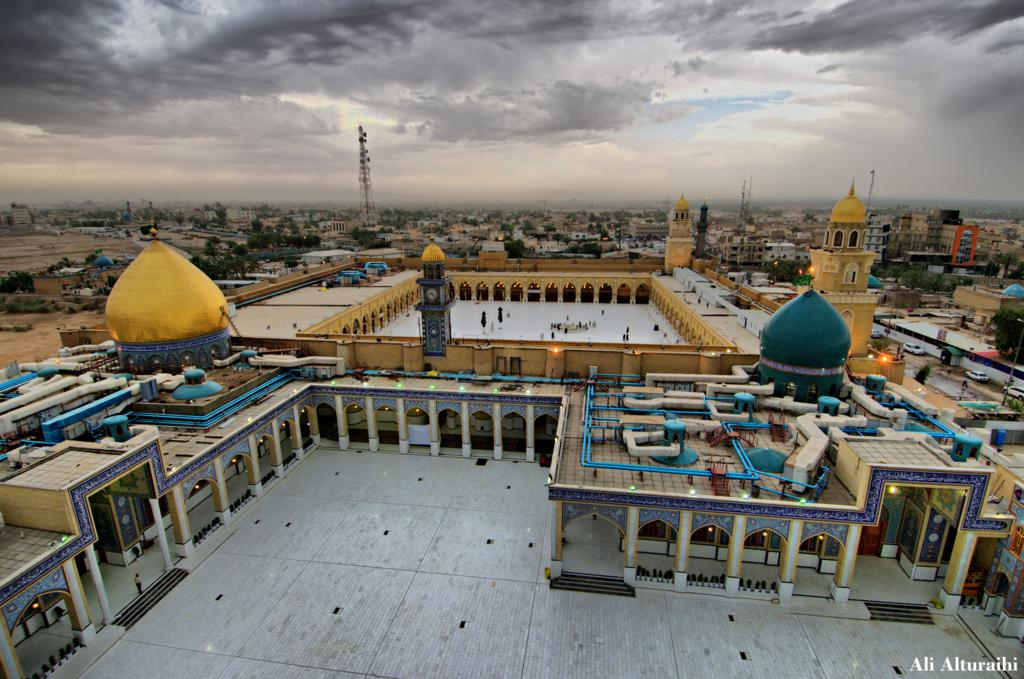
The Great Mosque of Kufa, formerly the home of Imam Ali, also contains the shrine of Muslim ibn Aqil

After being named caliph in 657, Imam Ali ibn Abi Talib established his capital at Kufa in present-day Iraq. The Battle of Karbala took place in 680, where Husayn ibn Ali was martyred by Umayyad forces of Ubayd Allah ibn Ziyad and Umar ibn Sa'd at the orders of Yazid ibn Mu'awiya. Many called for vengeance. Sulayman ibn Surad led the Tawwabin uprising in January 685, but was defeated and killed in Battle of Ayn al-Warda. After the failed uprising, Mukhtar al-Thaqafi once again called for the establishment of an Alid caliphate and for retaliation for Husayn's killing, and took over Kufa in October 685. Aided by Ibrahim ibn al-Ashtar, they successfully drove the Umayyads out of Kufa and defeated them in several battles, including the Battle of Khazir in 686, but were defeated shortly afterwards in 687, when Kufa was besieged by the governor of Basra Mus'ab ibn al-Zubayr.

In the early Islamic period, Kufa effectively became the "second capital" of Shiism after Medina, the residence of the Twelve Imams, and acted as a source of many Shiite scholars and disciples of the Twelve Imams, including: Hisham ibn al-Hakam, Zurarah ibn A'yun, Burayd ibn Mu'awiya, Mu'min al-Taq, Aban ibn Taghlib, Abu Basir al-Asadi and Muhammad bin Muslim, all disciples of Imam Ja'far al-Sadiq (702–765 CE). It was in Kufa where Zayd ibn Ali, the principal figure of Zaydism, led an uprising against the Umayyad rule of Hisham ibn Abd al-Malik which ended with Zayd's execution and burning, while Basra witnessed the Alid revolt of 762–763 by Muhammad al-Nafs al-Zakiyya's brother Ibrahim, who was said to have amassed a force as large as 100,000.

The 7th Twelver Imam Musa al-Kazim was repeatedly imprisoned in Baghdad and Basra at the orders of Abbasid caliphs al-Mansur, al-Hadi, al-Mahdi and Harun al-Rashid. During Al-Ma'mun's reign, in a sudden departure of anti-Shia policy, Imam Ali al-Rida was designated heir apparent of al-Ma'mun, but was later poisoned by al-Ma'mun himself. Some Shia officials managed to gain influence in the Abbasid court, such as Ali ibn Yaqteen, a Kufan who became a minister of the Abbasid caliph with the approval of Imam Musa al-Kadhim to assist the Shia.

The Twelver sect historically had been the most common among Shias in Iraq. However, Zaydism had a presence among Shia Kurds, and Isma'ilism had a presence among Shia Arabs in Musha'sha'. Zaydism and Isma'ilism later declined. Qizilbashism also had a presence among the Iraqi Turkmen, who continued their practices until the 1920s, when orthodox Twelver missionaries from Southern Iraq began to convert them. A known sect among them was Ibrahimiyya. The Turkmen with Qizilbash practices were very secretive about their religious practices to outsiders.

Aside from mainstream Shia Islam, Iraq was also the home of many Shia sects which no longer exist. Kufan followers of Mukhtar al-Thaqafi later formed the Kaysanite sect, who traced the line of Imamate to Muhammad ibn al-Hanafiyya. The Kaysanites had a significant role in the Abbasid Revolution after they managed to rally Shia support in Iraq for the uprising against the Umayyads. However, after the revolution, most Kaysanites soon joined Ja'far al-Sadiq or Muhammad al-Nafs al-Zakiyya, and eventually Ja'far al-Sadiq after the demise of Muhammad.

Another extinct sect are the Qarmatians, a sect of Isma'ili Shias founded by the Iraqi-born Hamdan Qarmat. Hamdan assumed the leadership of Isma'ili missionary activity in the rural environs (sawād) of Kufa and southern Iraq, and Qarmatian creed soon flourished in southern Iraq. Among the Iraqi dā'īs trained and sent to missions by Hamdan and Abu Muhammad were Ibn Hawshab (to the Yemen), and Abu Abdallah al-Shi'i, a Kufan-born dā'ī who later helped convert the Kutama in Ifriqiya and opened the way to the establishment of the Fatimid Caliphate.

=== 10th to 15th centuries ===
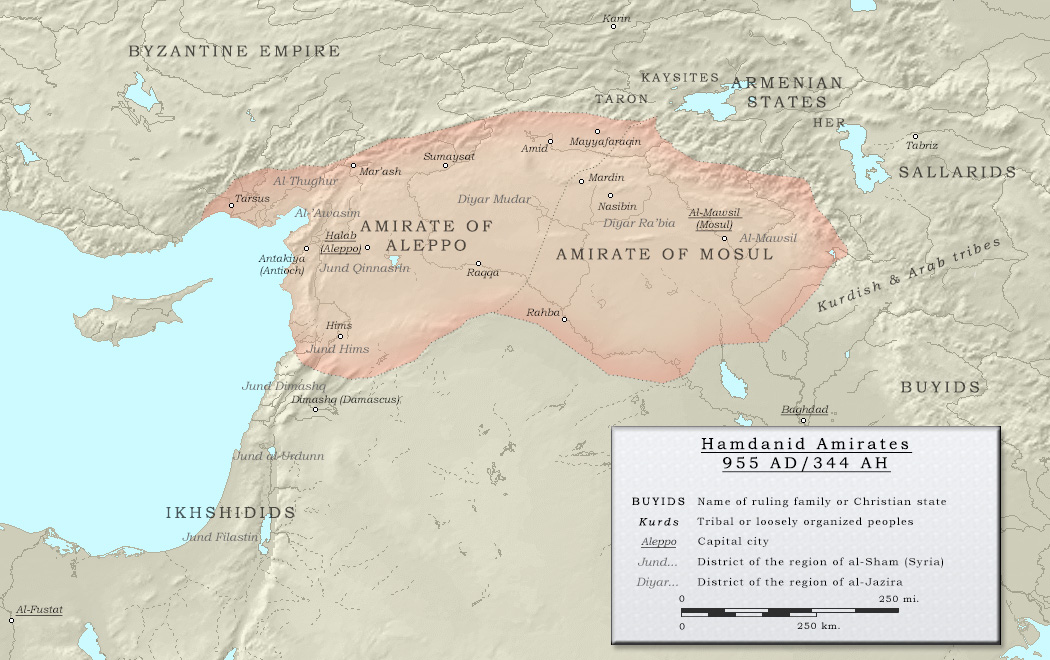
Hamdanid territory in 955 during the rule of Sayf al-Dawla

The Hamdanid dynasty of Banu Taghlib was among the first Twelver Shia dynasties formed in northern Iraq. The Hamdanids first emerged as governors of Mardin in 890 and Mosul in 905, and by 950 had expanded into most of Syria and western Iraq, informally forming a parallel authority to the one in Baghdad. During the 930s and 940s, the Hamdanids and the Buyids were in contest with another Shia, Abu Abdallah al-Baridi, an Iraqi tax-official who used the enormous wealth gained from tax farming to vie for control of the rump Abbasid Caliphate, temporarily holding Baghdad with brother twice.

The Hamdanids were succeeded in Mosul by another Shia dynasty, the Uqaylids who ruled roughly the same territory as the Hamdanids from 990 to 1096. In northern Syria, they incorporated the Shia Mirdasids into their service, who later rebelled against the Fatimids under Salih ibn Mirdas and established themselves as the emirs of most of present-day Syria, western Iraq and Lebanon, ruling from Aleppo.

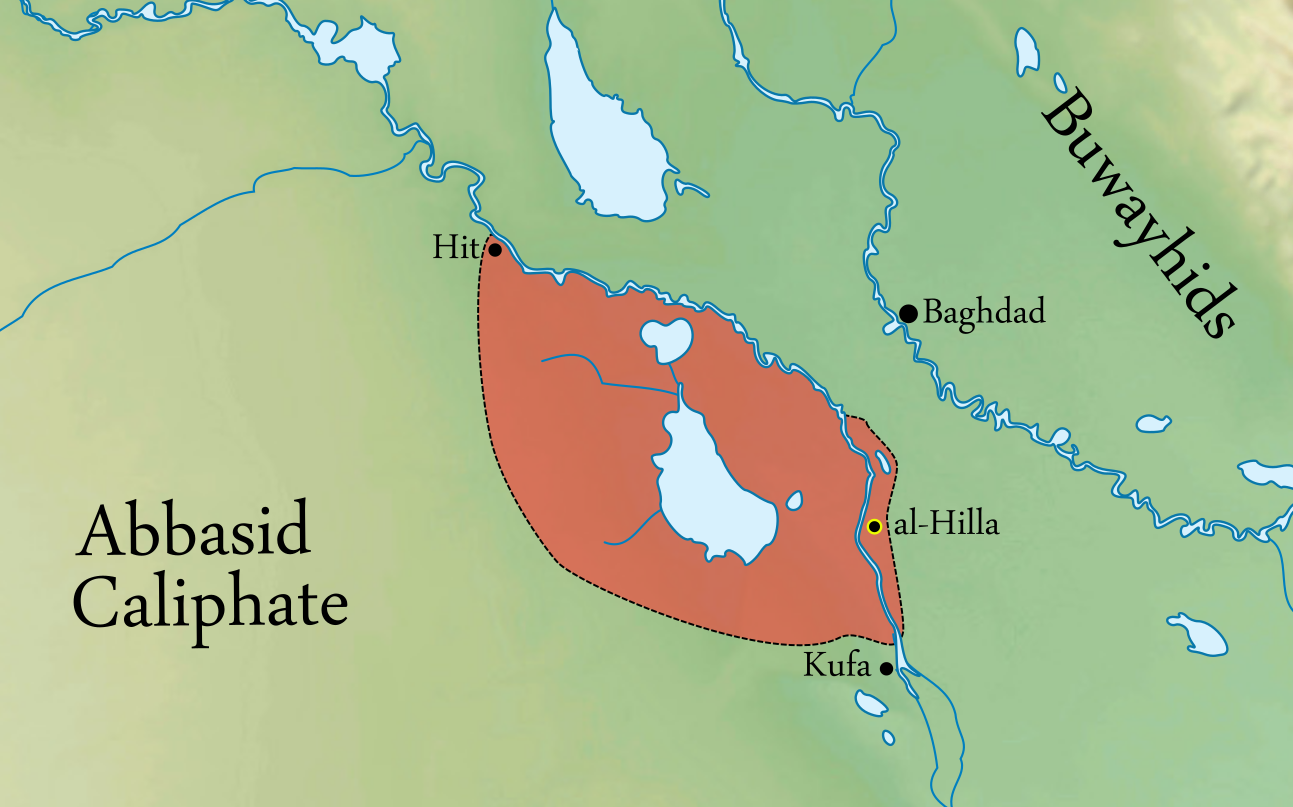
The Emirate of Banu Mazyad c. 1086

In central Iraq, the Mazyadids ruled an autonomous emirate in the area around Kūfa and Hīt between 961 and 1160 from their capital city of Hillah. They were originally in the service of the Buyid dynasty, another Twelver Shia dynasty which expanded into most of western Iran and Iraq, seizing Baghdad and making it as their capital. Later on, Hillah later became one of the central cities of Shia learning, where prominent Shia scholars and poets such as al-Allama al-Hilli, Muhaqqiq al-Hilli, Shahid Awwal and Safi al-Din al-Hilli lived and taught during the 12th–15th centuries.

=== 15th to 19th centuries ===
When the Safavid dynasty declared Shia Islam the official religion of Iran in 1501, Shia scholars from southern Iraq contributed to the conversion movement. The Safavids also invited many Shi'i Arab tribes to Khuzestan to act as a bulwark against the Ottoman Empire, earning Khuzestan the name of Arabestan.

Between the 15th and 19th centuries, many of the tribes living on the banks of the Euphrates and Tigris, which were originally Sunni, converted to Shia Islam. During the 19th century, the Ottoman Empire instituted a policy of settling the semi-nomadic Sunni Arab tribes to create greater centralization in Iraq. The tribes adopted a sedentary agricultural life in the hinterlands of Najaf and Karbala, and frequently traded and interacted with the residents of the two cities. Some Sunni Arab tribes converted to protest their treatment by the Sunni Ottomans.

Shia missionaries from Najaf and Karbala operated with relative freedom from the Ottoman Empire, and could proselytize with little official hindrance. The Bani Sallama, Tayy and al-Soudan in the Mesopotamian Marshes were converted by the Musha'sha'iyyah dynasty, a heretical Isma'ili Shia tribal confederation founded by Muhammad ibn Falah which ruled the town of Hoveyzeh in Khuzestan from 1435 to 1924. Another tribe, Banu Khaz'al, as well as the Banu Kaab converted during the mid-18th century. After the fall of the Emirate of Muhammara, an autonomous emirate of the Shia Banu Kaab between 1812 and 1925 in modern-day Khuzestan province, many Iranian Arabs fled to southern Iraq, further inflating the Shia population in the south.

The conversions continued into the 20th century, as the British noted in 1917. Many Iraqi Shia are relatively-recent converts. The following tribes were converted during this period: some of the Zubaid, Banu Lam, Albu-Muhammad, many of the Rabiah (including al-Dafaf'a, Bani Amir and al-Jaghayfa), Banu Tamim (including the Bani Sa’d, their largest group in Iraq), the Shammar Toga, some of the Dulaim, the Zafir, the Dawwar, the Sawakin, the al-Muntafiq confederation, the Bani Hasan (of the Bani Malik), the Bani Hukayyim, the Shibil of the Khazal, the al Fatla, the tribes along the Al-Hindiya canal, and the five tribes of Al Diwaniyah (Aqra’, Budayyir, Afak, Jubur and Jilaiha) which relied on the Daghara canal for water.

=== British mandate and Kingdom of Iraq ===
During the start of the 20th century, the Shia opposed Mandatory Iraq and the Sunni monarchy. As a result of their neglect by Ottomans, and their poverty, the Shiites were increasingly dependent on their ulama, the religious clerics. In 1920, Iraqis, whether Sunni or Shia, had grown more discontent with British rule. Many Iraqis began to fear that Iraq would be incorporated into the British Empire. One of the eminent Shia mujtahideen, Ayatollah Mirza Muhammad Taqi al-Shirazi, then issued a fatwa "declaring that service in the British administration was unlawful".

The revolt materialized in June 1920 and rapidly spread from Baghdad to the South, notably the town of Al-Rumaitha, where the Zawalim sheikh Shaalan Abu al-Jun was arrested and subsequently freed by his tribesmen. More Shia ulama, including Mirza Mahdi al-Shirazi, Mehdi Al-Khalissi and Muhammad Hasan Abi al-Mahasin displayed their support for the revolt, and encouraged the local population to take arms. At the peak of the revolt, around 131,000 Iraqis were active against the British.

Under the Kingdom of Iraq, the Shia tribes of the mid-Euphrates region saw themselves increasingly under-represented in the Sunni-dominated Iraqi government, which further deteriorated with the exclusion of key Shia sheikhs from the Iraqi parliament in 1934 elections. In addition, King Ghazi of Iraq, a Hashemite ruler of Iraq from 1933 to 1939, was driven, amongst other things, by anti-Shia ambitions. This ultimately led to the 1935–1936 Iraqi Shia revolts, mostly in the towns of Al-Rumaitha and al-Diwaniyah, led by Ayatollah Muhammad Husayn Kashif al-Ghita' and various Shia tribal sheikhs. For many, the 1935–1936 revolt uncovered a lack of community interest within the Iraqi Shia society and absence of strong Shia political leadership, to present their interests in Baghdad, a predicament shared by their correligonists in Lebanon.

Scholars such as Fanar Haddad have argued that the governments of the new Iraqi state tended to adopt the symbols of Sunni identity while suppressing Shia identity. For example, figures such as Saladin, Harun al-Rashid or Omar ibn al-Khattab who were venerated by Arab nationalists are viewed with suspicion in Shia folklore. This contributes to disaffection among Iraqi Shia, while at the same time Sunni Iraqi politicians have tended to cast Shia political mobilization as alien, in particular Iranian.

=== The creation of a Shia political movement ===
For many years, Arab nationalism and party politics superseded Shia unity in Iraqi politics, and Shia ayatollahs were politically quiescent. The Shia were generally less well-off economically and socially, and as a result, they supported leftist parties, such as Iraqi Communist Party which was founded by Husain al-Rahhal in 1934, and the Arab Socialist Ba'ath Party in Iraq, which was also founded by a Shia, Fuad al-Rikabi.

To counter the intellectual hold of the left, a group of clerics in Najaf created a movement that eventually evolved into the Dawa party. Its manifesto, written by Muhammad Baqir al-Sadr, probably in 1960, defined its ultimate goal as an Islamic polity.

=== Under the Baathist regime ===
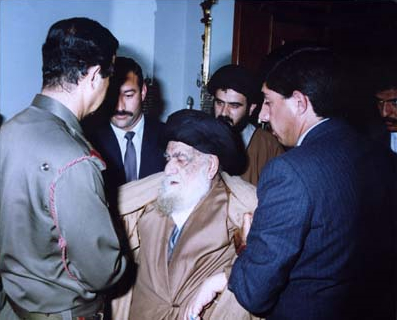
Ayatollah Abu al-Qasim al-Khoei is brought in front of Saddam Hussein after Shia uprisings in 1991.

In 1963, a coalition of military officers and others led by the Arab nationalist and socialist Ba'ath Party seized power in a coup. At that point, 53 percent of its membership was Shia. In the years following the Shia were shunted aside, and by 1968, only six percent of the Ba'ath party were Shia. Abdul Salam Arif, president from the 1963 coup until his death in 1966, used derogatory terms in leadership meetings to describe Iraqi Shia and opposed his predecessor Abd al-Karim Qasim's policy of bringing all citizens into the regime regardless of ethnicity or religion.

Due to discrimination by the Sunni government, the Shia became increasingly disaffected during the last 1960s and 1970s. By 1968, Dawa could claim a mass following, and the Baath began to consider it a threat. In 1974, amid rising discontent due to casualties in the Kurdish insurgency, the regime executed five leading Dawa members. Subsequently, the regime banned annual Marad al-ras processions during the Mourning of Muharram in the shrine cities, where mass discontent had been evident in 1974 and 1975. In 1977, tens of thousands of Dawa activists held the processions in defiance of the ban, leading to large-scale clashes known as the Safar Intifada that the regime quelled with the use of helicopter gunships. At least 16 were killed, eight executed and two died under torture.

The success of the Iranian Revolution intensified unrest and repression. In June 1979, Ayatollah Muhammad Baqir al-Sadr was arrested and placed under house arrest. Less than a year later, due to encouraging the 1979–1980 Shia uprising in Iraq, Sadr and his sister Bint al-Huda were both executed in April 1980. In 1982, the Supreme Council for the Islamic Revolution in Iraq was formed in Iran by Iraqi cleric Mohammad Baqir al-Hakim as an umbrella group to overthrow Iraq's Sunni-dominated regime. In Iran, Hakim attempted to unite and co-ordinate the activities of al-Dawa party and other major Shia groups: Peykar (a guerilla organization similar to the Iranian Mujahideen) and Jama'at al-'Ulama (groups of pro-Khomeini ulama).

The Ba'ath Party's leadership made a determined effort to gain the support of Iraqi Shia during the 1980–1988 Iran–Iraq War, as 80% of the Iraqi army personnel had been Iraqi Shia, diverting resources to the Shia south and emphasizing Iraqi Arabness (in contrast to Iranian Persianness) and the historic struggle between the Muslim Arabs and the Zoroastrian Persians in propaganda. Iraqi propaganda used symbolic keywords such as Qādisiyya (the battle in which Muslim Arab armies defeated the Persian Empire), and Iranian propaganda used Shia keywords such as Karbala. The Baath government executed about 95 Shia ulama, many of them members of the al-Hakim family, in June 1984, and had executed 142–146 Shia rebels in the town of Dujail earlier in 1982.

Unrest renewed with the 1991 Iraqi uprisings throughout Iraq, which took place in the Shiite and Kurdish areas of the country. In the south, the rebels seized the shrine as Ba'ath Party officials fled the city or were killed. The uprising spread within days to all of the largest Shia cities in southern Iraq: Amarah, Diwaniya, Hilla, Karbala, Kut, Nasiriyah and Samawah. Smaller cities were swept up in the revolution as well. Many exiled Iraqi dissidents, including thousands of Iran-based Badr Brigades militants of SCIRI, crossed the borders and joined the rebellion. Demonstration against the regime took place in Shia neighborhoods of Baghdad.

By April 1991, most of the rebellion was crushed by the then-incumbent Baathist government. Many of the people killed were buried in mass graves. Of the 200 mass graves the Iraqi Human Rights Ministry had registered between 2003 and 2006, the majority were in the South, including one believed to hold as many as 10,000 victims. During the 1991 Iraqi uprisings, over 200,000 Shia Arabs and 100,000 Marsh Arabs died in southern Iraq. A short period of rest once again occurred during the 1999 Shia uprising in Iraq after the killing of Muhammad-Sadiq al-Sadr in the Shia neighborhoods of Baghdad, as well as southern majority Shiite cities of Karbala, Nasiriyah, Kufa, Najaf, and Basra. Though the allegations on the government behind the assassination has never been proved.

=== During the Iraqi conflict (2003–present) ===
After the US-led 2003 invasion of Iraq, sectarian violence between Shia and the Sunnis steadily escalated. By 2007, the United States' National Intelligence Estimate described the violence as a "civil war". During the 2006–2008 sectarian violence, tens to hundreds of thousands of people were killed (mainly Shia civilians) and 1.7 million were internally displaced by February 2007, according to António Guterres, UN High Commissioner for Refugees. In ISIL-occupied Iraq (2014–2017) Shias faced some of the worst treatment, and thousands were killed for their faith.

== Demographics ==
Shia Muslims in Iraq are ethnically made up of Arabs in central and southern Iraq, Turkmens in the north, Kurds in the northeast, and Persians throughout the holy cities. No exact and recent data is available for the ethno-religious composition of Iraq, and due to this, all numbers in this regard are approximations. In 2003 the Shia Muslims population was estimated to make up around 55% of Iraq's population. The data on the religious affiliation of Iraq's population are uncertain. 95–99% of the population are Muslims. The CIA World Factbook reports a 2015 estimate according to which 29–34% are Sunni Muslims and 61–64% Shia Muslims. According to a 2011 survey by Pew Research, 51% of the Muslims identify as Shia and 42% as Sunni.

== Notable people ==
=== Academics ===
- Ali Allawi, banker, historian and political economist
- Ali Al-Wardi, social scientist
- Azzam Alwash, geotechnical engineer and environmentalist
- Farouk Al-Kasim, petroleum geologist
- Jafar Dhia Jafar, nuclear physicist, considered the father of Iraq's Baathist-era nuclear program
- Hisham al-Hashimi, historian
- Kanan Makiya, author and professor of religious studies
- Lihadh Al-Gazali, geneticist and paediatrician
- Malik Dohan al-Hassan, politician and legal scholar, former minister of culture
- Muhammad N. S. Hadi, civil engineer and professor
- Nadje Sadig Al-Ali, professor of anthropology
- Sinan Al Shabibi, economist, governor of the Central Bank of Iraq from 2003 to 2012
- Wafaa Bilal, art professor

=== Activists ===
- Muntadhar al-Zaidi
- Faisal Saeed Al Mutar
- Kazim al-Samawi
- Worood Zuhair

=== Architects ===
- Mohamed Makiya, architect
- Manhal Al Habbobi, architect, former mayor of Baghdad

=== Artists ===
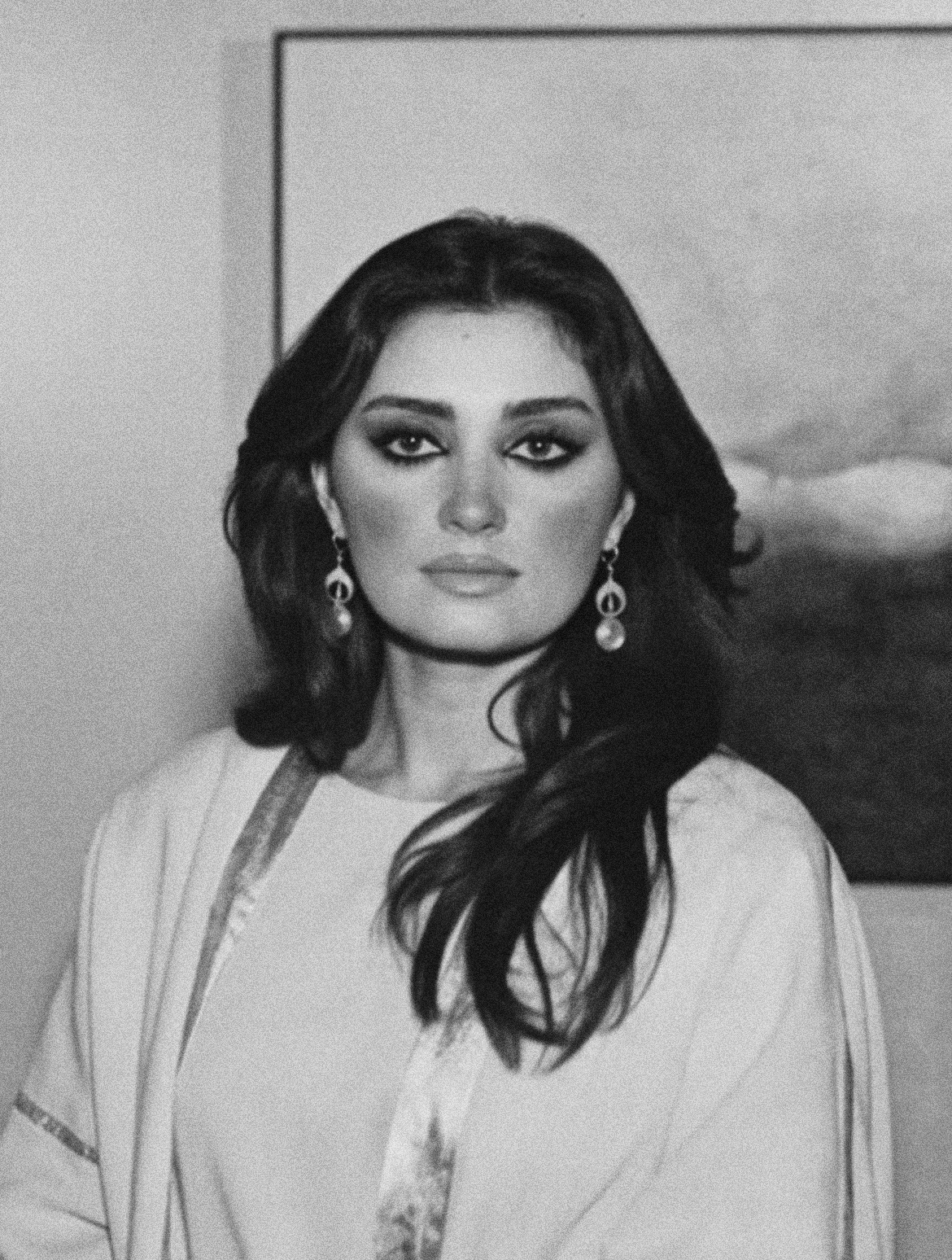
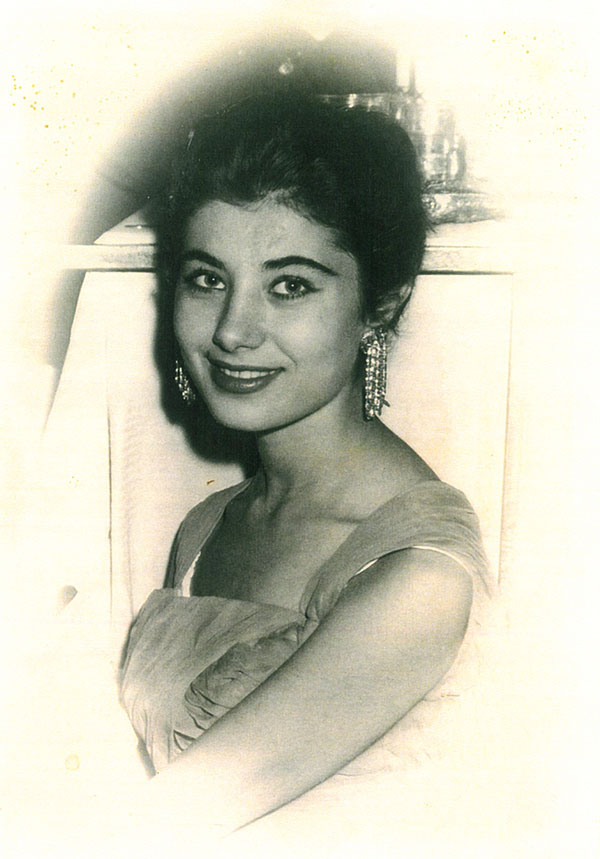
Layla and Suad al-Attar
- al-Farazdaq (641–730), prominent Arab poet of ahlulbayt
- Farida Mohammad Ali
- Hussam Al-Rassam, singer
- Layla Al-Attar (1944–1993), painter and actress, director of Iraqi Art Museum
- Majid al-Muhandis, singer
- Muhammad Mahdi al-Jawahiri, poet, considered by many the national poet of Iraq
- Muzaffar Al-Nawab, poet and political critic
- Namaa Alward, actress and political activist
- Nazik Al-Malaika, poet noted among the first Arab poets to use Free verse
- Nora Foss al-Jabri, singer
- Rida Al Abdullah, singer and actor
- Saadoun Jaber, singer and songwriter
- Salah Al-Hamdani, poet, actor and playwright
- Shatha Hassoun, singer
- Suad al-Attar, painter
- Walid Hassan, comedian

=== Generals/Military personnel ===
- Abdul-Amir Yarallah, Iraqi army general, current Chief of Staff
- Abdul-Ghani al-Asadi, Iraqi army general, CTC commander
- Abdul-Wahab al-Saadi, Iraqi army general, Knight of the French Legion of Honour
- Abdul-Wahid Shannan ar-Ribat, Iraqi army general, Chief of Staff during 1995-1999
- Abu Tahsin al-Salihi, sniper, nicknamed 'Shaykh of Snipers'
- Othman al-Ghanmi, Iraqi army general, chief of staff, first Iraqi to receive the Legion of Merit
- Salam Jassem Hussein, Iraqi army brigadier general, known more famously as "Major Salam"
- Talib Shaghati Iraqi army general, Knight of the French Legion of Honour

=== Politicians ===
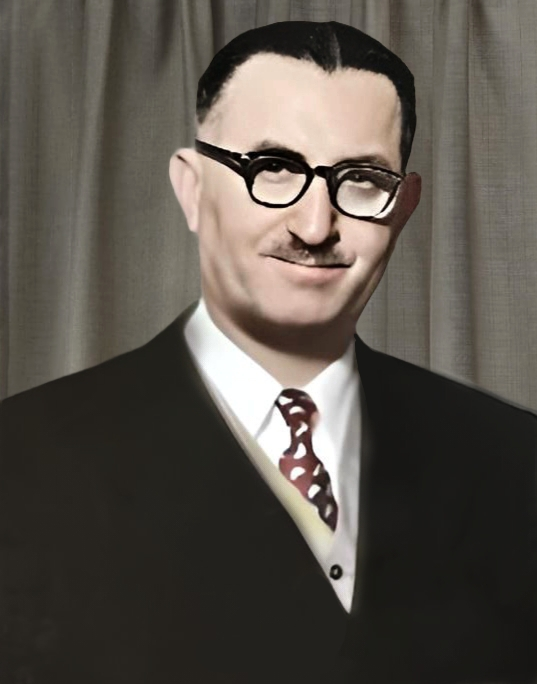
Muhammad Fadhel al-Jamali

- Abu Firas al-Hamdani, governor
- Muhammad ibn al-Musayyab, Uqaylid Emir
- Muslim ibn Quraysh, Uqaylid sultan, patriarch of the Bani Muslim tribe
- Mukhtar al-Thaqafi (d. 687), a pro-Alid revolutionary in Kufa
- Sulayman ibn Surad (d. 685), Kufan leader of Tawwabin uprising in 685
- Hamdan Qarmat (fl. 874–899), eponymous founder of the Qarmatian Ismai'lism
- Abu Abdallah al-Shi'i (fl. 902–909), Isma'ili missionary in Yemen and North Africa whose efforts lead to the establishment of Fatimids
- Abdul-Wahab Mirjan, last Prime Minister of Kingdom of Iraq from 1957–1958
- Husain al-Radi
- Fuad al-Rikabi, founder of Arab Socialist Ba'ath Party – Iraq Region
- Muhammad Fadhel al-Jamali (1903–1997), statesman and founder of the United Nations
- Sa'dun Hammadi (1930–2007), former prime minister and parliament leader under Saddam Hussein
- Aqila al-Hashimi
- Salama al-Khufaji
- Muhammad Saeed al-Sahhaf (b. 1940), foreign minister and minister of information of Ba'athist Iraq

=== Religious scholars ===
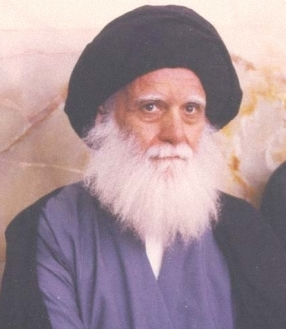
Muhammad al-Sadr

- Abd al-Hadi al-Shirazi, Twelver marja'
- Abu al-Qasim al-Khoei, Twelver marja' (d. 1992)
- Ahmed Al-Waeli, Twelver cleric (d. 2003)
- Jabir ibn Hayyan, distinguished Islamic scholar and one of the students of Ja'far al-Sadiq.
- Ali al-Sistani, Twelver mujtahid and marja'
- Allamah Al-Hilli (1250–1325), prominent Shia theologian and mujtahid
- Ammar Nakshawani, public speaker and Islamic scholar
- Mirza Mahdi al-Shirazi, Twelver marja'
- Mohammad Baqir al-Hakim (1939–2003), prominent Shia scholar and marja'
- Mohammed Ridha al-Shirazi, Islamic scholar, educator
- Mohammad Mohammad Sadeq al-Sadr (1943–1999)
- al-Shaykh Al-Mufid (948–1022), prominent Shia theologian and mutakallim
- Mehdi Al-Khalissi, marja' and revolutionary
- Muhammad Baqir al-Sadr, prominent Shia scholar, philosopher and child prodigy
- Muhsin al-Hakim, prominent Shia scholar and former leader of Islamic Supreme Council of Iraq
- al-Sharīf al-Murtaḍā (965–1044), prominent Shia scholar and teacher of Shaykh Tusi
- al-Sharīf al-Raḍī (970–1015), prominent Shia scholar and poet, compiler of Nahj al-Balagha

=== Sportspeople ===
- Abdul-Wahid Aziz, weightlifting Olympic bronze medalist
- Amir Albazi, professional mixed martial artist
- Ali Al-Hamadi, professional footballer
- Raad Hammoudi, professional footballer, former head of Iraqi Olympic Committee

== See also ==
- Arab tribes in Iraq

== Bibliography ==
- Momen, Moojan (1985). An Introduction to Shi'i Islam. Yale University Press. ISBN 0300035314.
- Nakash, Yitzhak (2003). The Shi'Is of Iraq. Princeton University Press. ISBN 978-0-691-11575-7.
