= Abu Azrael =

Commander in the Islamic Movement of Iraq

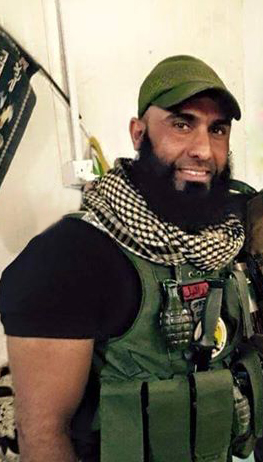
- Born: Ayoub Falih Hasan Al-Rubayie; April 26, 1978 (age 48); Sadr City, Ba'athist Iraq
- Military career
- Allegiance: Iraq
- Branch: Popular Mobilization Forces
- Nicknames: Abu Azrael; Angel of Death; Rambo
- Unit: Kataib al-Imam Ali
- Conflicts: Iraqi insurgency (2003–2011); War in Iraq (2013–2017); Salahuddin campaign; Battle of Tikrit; Battle of Baiji; Battle of Mosul (2016)

Ayoub Falih Hasan Al-Rubayie (Arabic: أيوب فالح حسن الربيعي; born 1978), known by his nom de guerre Abu Azrael, is an Iraqi commander in the Kataib al-Imam Ali, an Iraqi Shi'a militia group of the Popular Mobilization Forces that fought against the Islamic State (IS) in Iraq. He has become a public icon among Shia Iraqis, gaining a large following on social media.

Abu Azrael was a member of Muqtada al-Sadr's Mahdi Army, which fought against the U.S.-led Coalition forces during the Iraqi insurgency.

== Personal life ==
Abu Azrael is a Shi'a Muslim. He is a former university lecturer and a one-time Taekwondo champion. According to an Iranian source, reports from March 2015 claimed that Azrael is a father of five, and lives an ordinary life when not on the battlefield.

Following incidents where he was filmed desecrating the corpses of IS militants, Azrael stated that he had been told by a senior imam in Najaf that he should pray for penance and never do such a thing again.

In October 2019, he was beaten unconscious by protesting Iraqis in Baghdad's Tahrir Square.

In 2020, he was infected with COVID-19 and suffered lung damage.

== Public image ==
Abu Azrael has fought directly against IS and is viewed as a symbol of resistance in Iraq. By the spring of 2015, he had made front-page appearances on international news websites in England, France and the United States.

He has received a medal of honour from the Representative of the Supreme Religious Authority Sayyid Ahmad al-Safi.

In 2016, he was spotted on the battlefield in the Battle of Mosul against IS.

During the Gaza war, Abu Azrael claimed to have been near the Israel–Lebanon border, waiting for "any opportunity" to enter Israel.

== See also ==
- Harith al-Sudani
- Abu Tahsin al-Salhi
- Salam Jassem Hussein
- Azrael
