= Alward =

Alward is a surname, and may refer to:

- Aaron Alward (1828–1886), Canadian physician and political figure
- David Alward (born 1959), Canadian politician
- Herb Alward (1865–1897), American football player and coach
- Herbert Alward, Austrian figure skater
- Namaa Alward (born 1953), Iraqi actress and political activist
- Roy Walter Alward (1877–1959), Canadian politician
- Peter Alward (born 1964), Canadian philosopher
- Silas Alward (1841–1919), Canadian politician
- Tom Alward (born 1952), American football player
