= Salam Jassem Hussein =

Iraqi military officer and counter-terrorism specialist (born 1979)

Salam Jassem Hussein Brigadier General
- Born: Salam Jassem Hussein; 1979 (age 46–47)
- Military career
- Allegiance: Iraq
- Branch: Iraqi Ground Forces
- Service years: 2003–current
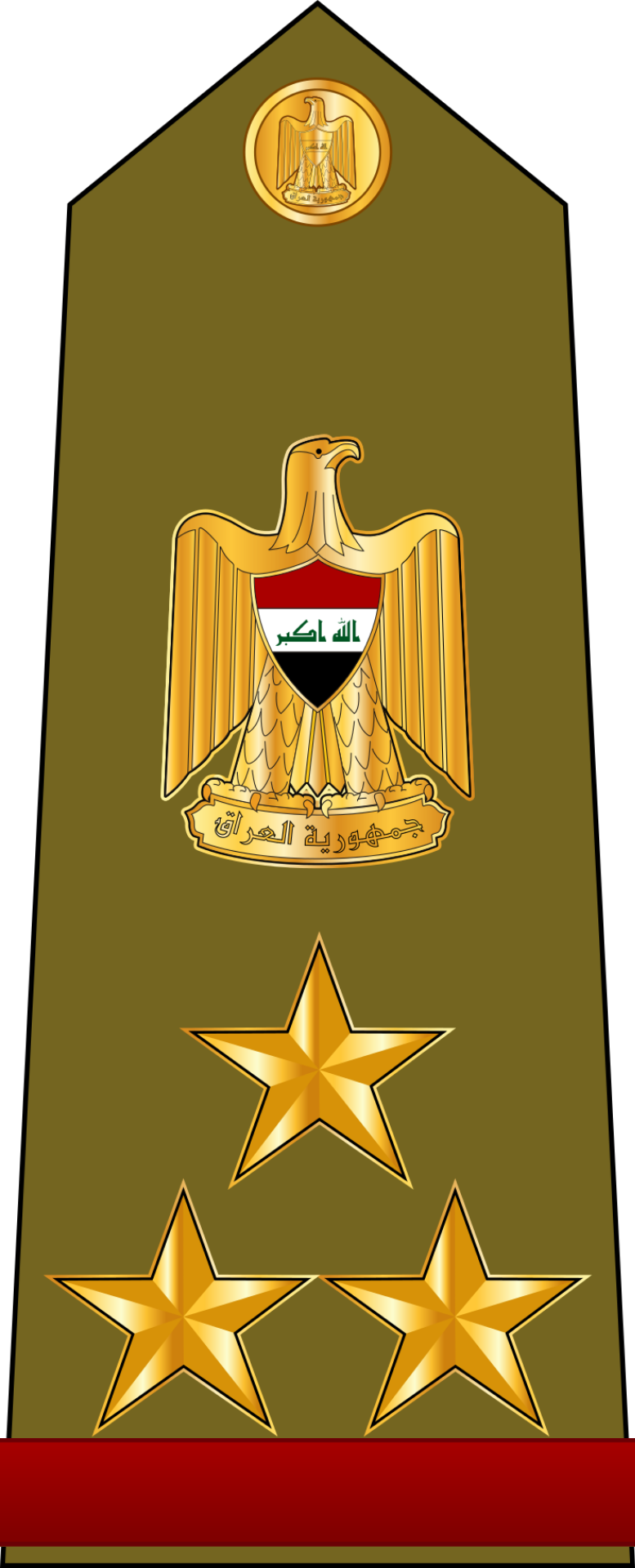
- Rank: Brigadier General
- Nickname: Major Salam
- Unit: ISOF-1
- Known for: Leading the Iraqi Special Operations Forces during key battles against ISIS
- Conflicts: 2003–2006 phase of the Iraqi insurgency; War in Iraq (2014–2017); Salahuddin campaign; Anbar campaign (2015–16); Second Battle of Tikrit; Battle of Ramadi (2015–16); Battle of Fallujah (2016) (WIA); Mosul offensive (2016)

Salam Jassem Hussein al-Obeidi (also known as Major Salam, b: 1979) is an Iraqi army general who received media appraisal during the war against ISIS and the Second battle of Mosul (2016–2017). Salam became famous for his saying: "طفي الكاميرا" ("Turn off the camera" in Mesopotamian Arabic), which was uttered during a filmed interrogation of a suspected ISIS terrorist. In July 2024, he was promoted to brigadier general.

== Early life ==
Salam Jassem Hussein studied linguistics at university, studying English and Hebrew when the 2003 Iraqi war began. After the defeat of Saddam Hussein, Salam, against his father's wishes, entered the newly formed and Western-sponsored Iraqi army in late 2003. He was assigned to the Iraqi Counter-Terrorism Force (ICTF).

In 2004 he joined the fighting during the battle of Najaf against Shia militants from the Mahdi army.

== War against ISIS ==
When the war against ISIS erupted, Major Salam Hussein led the 2nd battalion of the 1st Brigade (ISOF-1), part of the Iraqi Special Operations Forces, known as the Golden Division. Major Hussein is critical of Iraq's political establishment, especially former Prime Minister Nouri al-Maliki, whom he regards as the main cause of his country's crisis. He forbade the use of influential Shia cleric Hussein's flag, frequently seen flying over Iraqi army's vehicles and voiced his opposition to anti-Sunni sectarian policies and violence supported or encouraged by various Shia politicians in power.

He joined the battles of Tikrit and Ramadi. On 9 June 2016, while involved in the battle of Fallujah where he sustained injuries from a missile attack.

In late 2016, while taking part in the second battle of Mossul, he led the 2nd ICTF Battalion which breached Mosul's Eastern defenses on 1 November 2016. In late December 2016, after the conquest of the Eastern side of Mosul, he left for the US to train 6 months. He returned to Mosul in June 2017 with the rank of lieutenant-colonel, to lead the offensive on Mosul's old town, on the western bank of the river.

== See also ==
- Iraqi Special Operations Forces aka Golden Division
- War in Iraq (2014–2017)
- Captain Harith al-Sudani
- Abu Azrael
- Abu Tahsin al-Salhi
