= 2017 Western Iraq campaign =

Military campaign against ISIL

- Part of the War in Iraq (2013–2017)
- Map of the Iraqi advances in Western Iraq
Date	26 October – 9 December 2017 (1 month, 1 week and 6 days)
Location	Western Iraq: Western Anbar Governorate; al-Jazira Desert (Parts of Nineveh Governorate, Saladin Governorate and Anbar Governorate); 33.4167°N 43.3000°E
Result	Iraqi victory: End of the War in Iraq (2013-2017).; Remaining IS fighters flee to remote deserts and mountains following December 2017 and stage a low-intensity insurgency against Iraqi forces and allies.
Territorial changes	The Iraqi Army recaptures Al-Qa'im, the Al-Qa'im District, Al-Qa'im border crossing, and Rawa.; Iraqi forces fully control all Iraqi territory.

Belligerents
Iraq; CJTF–OIR	Islamic State

Commanders and leaders
(Iraq) Lt. Gen. Abdel Emir Yarallah	(Islamic State) Abu Bakr al-Baghdadi

Units involved
(Iraq) Iraqi pro-government forces; Iraqi security forces; Armed Forces; Federal Police; Local Sunni tribes; Popular Mobilisation Forces	Military of the Islamic State

Strength
Unknown	1,500 (CJTF-OIR estimate)

Casualties and losses
Unknown	Unknown

The 2017 Western Iraq campaign was the final military operation of the 2013–2017 war in Iraq, in the western province of Anbar, and on the border with Syria, with the goal of completely expelling IS forces from their last strongholds in Iraq.

The offensive followed the Hawija offensive by the Iraqi Government, and was also concurrent with several major offensives in Syria: the Syrian Democratic Forces' Deir ez-Zor offensive, and the Syrian Government's Battle of Deir ez-Zor and Eastern Syria campaign on the opposite side of the Al-Qa'im border crossing.

== Background ==
Al-Qa'im was known as a hotbed of jihadist insurgency, after the 2003 invasion of Iraq, with coalition forces carrying out repeated operations against Al-Qaeda jihadists. The strategic and porous border started becoming a route for foreign fighters entering Iraq from Syria, who was accused by Iraqi Government of ignoring it.

The towns of western Anbar were captured by the Islamic State of Iraq and the Levant in 2014. Before the 2017 offensive, Iraqi forces had dislodged the group from key cities of Anbar including Ramadi and Fallujah but the areas near border with Syria including Anah, Rawa, Al-Qaim left and the vast rural areas across the province remained under militant control. An Iraqi operation was launched towards west Anbar in January 2017, but was suspended after recapture of towns of Sagra and Zawiya because of preparations for retaking the western bank of Mosul.

In September 2017, the Iraqi Army launched an offensive in the western Anbar Province, recapturing the towns of Akashat on 16 September and Anah on 21 September. After recapturing Hawija on 5 October the Iraqi Army was expected to fight IS in Anbar. Instead, it paused its military actions and later started advancing on Kirkuk.

== The campaign ==
=== Al-Qaim ===
Prime Minister Haider al-Abadi announced an offensive to recapture the western border region of al-Qaim and Rawa on 26 October. He stated, "The heroic legions are advancing into the last den of terrorism in Iraq to liberate al-Qaim, Rawa and the surrounding villages and hamlets." Iraqi forces including the troops, police, Sunni tribesmen and mostly Shia militias, participated in the assault. Later, Lieutenant-General Abdul Amir Yarallah announced that they had cleared Umm al-Waz village, 55 kilometres (34 mi) south-east of al-Qa'im, and the H-2 Air Base, along with the nearby Husseiniyat area, 120 kilometres (75 mi) south of al-Qaim. According to the United Nations, around 50,000 people were still in al-Qaim and Rawa. Meanwhile, Walid al-Dulaimi, an Iraqi army colonel, told Anadolu Agency that they had captured Rawa intersection and the Jabbab district, which is about 2 kilometres (1.2 mi) west of Rawa.

Iraqi Army's War Media Cell announced on 27 October that the Popular Mobilisation Units (PMU) had secured 43 kilometres (27 mi) of the Akashat-al-Qaim road and an area of 301 km^{2} (116.2 sq mi) (south of al-Qa'im. It also added that PMU captured al-Qakm cement plant, al-Qaom Quarries, al-Qaim station and the water station. In the meantime, the Iraqi Army captured the villages of Awani, northern Jabab and al-Zalla on the southern bank of the Euphrates river. Army Major-General Qasim al-Muhammadi told Anadolu Agency on the same day that 25 militants were killed in a clash between Iraqi Army and IS near T1 area, 40 kilometres (25 mi) of al-Qa'im. He added that a large number of militants also retreated to center of al-Qaim district. Ahmed al-Dulaimi, an Anbar police captain, stated that five militants and two tribal fighters were killed in the same area a day earlier.

The Joint Operations Command (JOC) stated on 28 October that pro-Iraqi forces had taken control of large areas to east of al-Qaim, after routing the militants from their hideouts. It also stated that the Iraqi troops had also captured many villages, a bridge on the Euphrates, the al-Qaim railway station, a military airbase, and the Akkas gas field. The JOC added that so far, 75 militants had been killed, while nine SVBIEDs, 10 militant vehicles, and four bomb-making sites had been destroyed, while 378 roadside bombs were defused or detonated. The JOC also reported that 33 villages had been recaptured from IS, within 2 days of the offensive. The Defence Ministry stated on 29 October that Iraqi aeroplanes had dropped thousands of leaflets in IS-held areas of Anbar, urging militants to surrender. An Iraqi security source stated on the same day that IS fighters had fled towards Al-Bukamal in Syria, after many leaders fled and were killed in airstrikes. Meanwhile, Qatari al-Samarmad, a PMU commander, stated that Ra'ed al-Atouri, the ISIL military official of al-Qa'im, and six of his companions had been killed by Iraqi warplanes.

By 31 October, Iraqi forces had reached the edge of al-Qaim. The JOC announced that Iraqi forces, backed by United States' aerial strikes and Sunni tribal fighters, had captured the village of al-Obeidi, adding that even though IS resisted the advance of the troops, the majority retreated to centre of al-Qaim. Yarallah stated that they had also captured a cement plant and a phosphate processing facility. He added that they also took control of a nearby residential complex, nine villages around Obeidi as well as large areas of Akkas gas field. Army Brigadier-General Numaan Abdul-Zobai said that they also captured villages of Rafedah and Al-Kasim to west of al-Qaim. Minister of Oil Jabar al-Luaibi stated on 2 November that Iraq forces had captured the Akkas gas field. Major-General Numaan Abd al-Zawbaei, commander of the army's 7th Division, said on the same day that regular troops backed by the PMU had captured Al-Saada area, and the nearby villages of Jereejib and Qunaitera, west of Al-Qaim, killing several militants and destroying a number of booby-trapped vehicles.

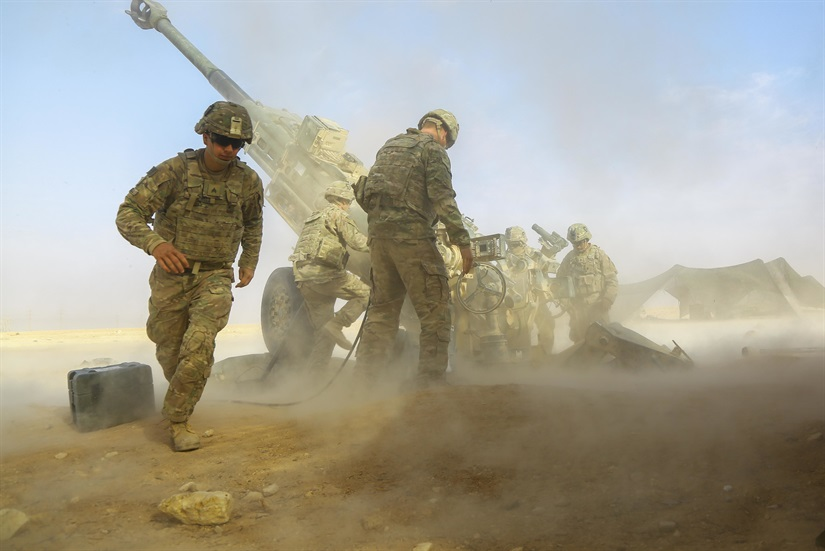
United States Army artillery provides fire support for Iraqi security forces near al-Qa'im, 7 November 2017

On 3 November, the Iraqi Army captured the Abu Kamal-Al-Qa'im border crossing. The JOC announced they had entered al-Qa'im as well. The PMU captured the town's train station, as well as the al-Karabilah neighbourhood during the day, while also entering the Gaza neighbourhood. Later on the same day, Prime Minister Haider al-Abadi announced that Iraqi Government forces had captured al-Qa'im. Iraqi Government forces also recaptured the rest of the Al-Qa'im District. This stripped IS of all its border crossings along the Iraqi–Syrian border, and left only Rawa under IS rule.

=== Interlude ===
Following the loss of the border city of Al-Qa'im and Deir ez-Zor, Al-Bukamal in Syria was the last town of note under their full control, where they were expected to make their final stand. IS forces also began massing at Al-Bukamal, boosted by the retreating IS fighters from Iraq. On 5 November, the Syrian Observatory for Human Rights (SOHR) claimed that IS had driven out PMU out of Al-Bukamal's countryside. However Kata'ib Hezbollah spokesman Jaafar al-Husseini stated that they clashed with IS just metres from border with Syria and fired rockets into Syria, adding that their forces did not cross into Syria.

=== Rawa ===
Prime Minister Haider al-Abadi stated on 11 November that the Iraqi forces were launching an operation to push militants out of an area in western Iraq. The offensive to recapture Rawa was launched during the day. Two Iraqi divisions and Sunni tribal fighters carried out the operation. Yarallah said that the troops had captured Rumana and its bridge, along with 10 other villages. Iraqi Army Col. Waleed al-Dulaimi told Anadolu Agency that Iraqi forces captured six villages on 13 November. He added that militants had fled from the villages towards the desert north-west of the city of Rawa. Lieutenant-General Abdul Amir Yarallah stated on 15 November that they had killed 48 militants during the past three days while capturing 13 villages.

Iraqi military stated on 17 November that security forces had penetrated into Rawa. Yarallah of the JOC stated that Iraqi troops and paramilitary forces had started the push at dawn and had captured four neighbourhoods after some hours. Iraqi forces captured Rawa later in the day. Yarallah stated that the government troops and paramilitary units "liberated the whole of Rawa and raised the Iraqi flag on all of its official buildings." Prime Minister al-Abadi congratulated Iraqi armed forces and people, saying Rawa was retaken in record time. He stated: "Liberation of Rawa district in mere hours reflects the great strength and power of our heroic armed forces and the successful planning for battles." A military spokesman stated, "With the liberation of Rawa we can say all the areas in which Daesh is present have been liberated." He added that Iraqi forces will pursue the militants who fled into the desert and exert control over Iraq's borders.

=== Al-Jazirah Desert ===
Prime Minister al-Abadi stated on 21 November that while IS was already defeated from a military perspective, he would declare the final victory only after it were defeated in the desert areas. On 23 November, Iraqi forces announced the launch of an offensive to clear the desert bordering Syria. Army, police and paramilitary units advanced into areas of Saladin, Nineveh and Anbar Governorates forming part of the region called al-Jazira.

Iraqi forces stated on 24 November that IS was withdrawing deep into the desert to escape the offensive. The PMF stated its forces had taken control of 77 villages since the launch of the offensive. It added that five militants were killed south of Hatra, but otherwise the militants put up little resistance. It also stated that it had taken control of an airfield in the same area, where they discovered underground warehouses used by the militants. The Iraqi military later stated that the forces had captured 45 villages, clearing some 2,400 km^{2} (926.6 sq mi) on 24 November.

The Iraqi military stated on 27 November that it was facing a tough battle against the militants, in deep gorges and other natural hideouts in the western desert. Gen. Yahya Rasoul, JOC spokesman, declared that the first phase was over and they had retaken half of the around 29,000 km^{2} (11,197 sq mi). desert area. Iraqi forces announced a new phase on 8 December against the remaining militant holdouts in the western desert.

Prime Minister al-Abadi declared final victory over IS on 9 December after Iraqi forces drove away the last remnants. Iraqi military stated that the forces had recaptured the last areas still under the group's control. Yarallah stated that the troops had taken control of over 90 villages and cleared 19,600 km^{2} of land during the last operation over the past day.

== Aftermath ==
On 10 December, Iraqi forces held a military parade in Baghdad's Green Zone to celebrate their victory over IS. Prime Minister al-Abadi declared that 10 December would become a new annual holiday for Iraq. Following their victory, Iraqi forces expected a new phase of insurgency from the remaining IS elements.

== See also ==
- Anbar campaign (2013–14)
- Battle of Ramadi (2014–15)
- 2nd Anbar
  - 2nd Ramadi
  - Siege of Fallujah (2016)
  - Battle of Fallujah (2016)
- Mosul offensive (2016)
  - 4th Mosul
  - Western Nineveh
- Battle of Tal Afar (2017)
- Hawija Offensive (2017)
- Battle of Kirkuk (2017)
- Battle of Baghuz Fawqani
