= Harith al-Sudani =

Iraqi intelligence officer and spy

Harith al-Sudani Captain
- حارث السوداني
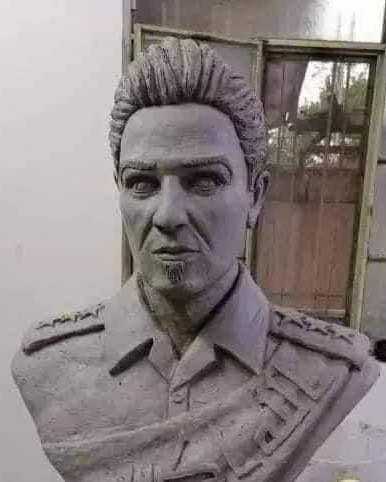
- Born: Harith al-Sudani; 1981; Ramadi, Ba'athist Iraq (present-day Iraq)
- Died: 2017 (aged 35–36); Place unconfirmed.
- Military career
- Allegiance: Iraq
- Branch: Iraqi Ground Forces
- Service years: 2013-2017
- Rank: Captain
- Unit: Iraqi Falcons Intelligence Cell
- Conflicts: War in Iraq (2013-17)

Captain Harith Al-Sudani (1981–2017, Arabic: حارث السوداني) was an Iraqi intelligence officer and spy. Al-Sudani rose to prominence during the War in Iraq (2013-17), where he infiltrated ISIS, becoming a trustee and car-bomb driver, allowing the Iraqi military to neutralize around 30 car-bomb attacks. He was described as "[Iraq]'s most successful spy" when he operated within the secret Falcons Intelligence Cell, the counter-terrorism unit that led operations against ISIS terrorist attacks. The Falcons have been praised by US services for infiltrating IS cells, killing or arresting leaders, preventing attacks and destroying weapons.

== Early life ==
Al-Sudani grew up in Ramadi then Baghdad, within a strict disciplinarian family, working after school in his father's small print shop. In university, he neglected his studies. Under pressure from family, he settled into an arranged marriage, returned to school to learn English and Russian, but eventually took a surveillance job for Iraq's oil infrastructures. The job did not inspire him. He and his brother Munaf were then recruited by the Falcons Intelligence Cell. Harith was hired in 2013, leveraging his computer and languages skills and assigned to monitor web traffic and telephone calls of terrorist suspects.

== Career ==
In 2014, with the emergence and sudden rise of ISIS, the Falcons were commissioned to infiltrate the group with undercover agents. Harith volunteered, motivated against ISIS crimes and children killed in ISIS attacks. Harith al-Sudani was promoted to captain and started training to pose as a jihadist. His childhood and family origins from Ramadi, a Sunni-dominated regions at the core of ISIS' miscontenment and raise, allowed al-Sudani to adopt the Ramadi accent and pretend to be a disempowered Sunni. A Shia Muslim, he trained himself into Sunni rituals, prayers, and favored Koran verses. He soon posed as Abu Suhaib, an unemployed Sunni Muslim from Baghdad.

His assigned mission was to infiltrate ISIS lair in Tarmiya, a town known to be a major source of suicide bombers to the capital. As Abu Suhaib, he was quickly recruited by local ISIS members within a monitored Tarmiya's mosque.

== Infiltrated ISIS operative ==
ISIS leadership quickly valued his perceived quality of being native from Baghdad, which would increase chances to pass through omniscient check points. First trained on explosives and religions, "Abu Suhaib" was put in charge of practical bombing operations, receiving Mosul's orders, selected suicide bombers sent from there, and picking up the explosive-loaded vehicles in preparation of ISIS attacks.

Al-Sudani's counter terrorism operation typically involved key aspects. Undercover, al-Sudani would inform his Falcon team of his mission, driving bomb-cars to Baghdad. A Falcons' chase car would follow, equipped with jamming devices to prevent remote phone activation of the bomb. At a check-point or agreed stop, he would let the Falcons demining team dismantle the bomb and replace it with relevant pyrotechnic devices, or lure and neutralize the suicide bomber he was transporting. Then, dropping the car at the target point, other Falcons agents would take place and act as victims of a light, controlled explosion. Photos and fake security briefs would be sent to news organisations to pretend a successful attack occurred. Captain al-Sudani would then be picked up by ISIS agents and get back to his infiltration mission.

In mid-2016, following various military and intelligence defeats, ISIS increased their terror campaign. Al-Sudani was asked to scout for new places to target. He used his longer presence in Baghdad to pay a visit to his family, receiving a worrying phonecall from ISIS operatives pointing out his GPS position was not as he claimed.

== Last mission ==
Due to al-Sudani's GPS driving patterns likely monitored by ISIS and on-site damages not matching the explosives amount put into suicide-cars, ISIS grew suspicious of him. Mosul's leadership dispatched him on a car bombing mission for December 31, 2016, as part of a wider and coordinated multi-city bombing. Unknown to him, ISIS bugged a white Kia Bongo truck with a microphone and GPS. When al-Sudani drove to his destination together with his explosive payload and started phone communication with the Falcons security team, ISIS secretly overheard the conversation, confirming al-Sudani's infiltration within their ranks. When al-Sudani drove off toward the agreed meeting point with the demining team, he received a call from ISIS operative, pointing out his claimed position and GPS weren't matching, which he explained by a driving error. At a closer point, eight agents swiftly dismantled the vehicle's bomb made of a detonator, 26 bags of C4 explosive, ammonium nitrate, and ball bearings. Replaced with the relevant fake bomb, the car headed to its target, outside of Al Bayda Cinema in Baghdad al Jadeeda, and exploded as expected. Around midnight, news outlet reported an explosion with no casualties.

== Death ==
On January 17, 2017, Al-Sudani was called back into an unusual location in the countryside of Tarmiya. Contact with Captain al-Sudani was lost soon after his arrival. A rescue operation was mounted in 3 days, the time needed to plan an action into ISIS stronghold, but failed to find Captain al-Sudani while one special forces soldier was killed. Some intelligences suggested he was prisoner in Qaim, another ISIS stronghold, or taken to Syria. In August 2017, ISIS published a video showing the execution of blindfolded suspected spies. Despite Harith not being named, his brother Munaf believes that Harith was one of the prisoners executed. Iraqi intelligence believes that Al-Sudani was held prisoner for seven months before his killing.

== Recognition ==
The family of Captain al-Sudani only learnt of his critical anti-terrorism role after his death. As of August 2018, the al-Sudani family has been trying for a year to get recognition for Harith's role and claim the relevant pensions for his widow and three children. Based on the ISIS execution video, both his Falcons Intelligence Cell and Iraqi's Joint Military Command announced his death in a counter-terrorism operation. But since al-Sudani was killed in ISIS territories, no material proof is available to administratively confirm the serviceman's death in action and provide a death certificate. The initial August 12, 2018, New York Times coverage ignited numerous media coverage and popular reaction over al-Sudani’s actions and heroism. On Monday 13th, according to Harith's father, an assistant of Prime Minister Haider al-Abadi contacted the al-Sudani family in order to facilitate the family's requests. The official called the appropriate administrative court judges in order to issue a formal death certificate, while another official admitted this situation to be unfortunately typical. The family thanked the officials for mediating in their favour.

In 2021, Margaret Coker authored the book, "The Spymaster of Baghdad" which outlines the actions of Harith in his infiltration of Daesh.

== See also ==
- Iraqi Civil War (2014–2017)
- Major Salam Jassem Hussein
- Abu Azrael
- Abu Tahsin al-Salhi
