= Falcons Intelligence Cell =

Iraqi law enforcement unit

Falcons Intelligence Cell خلية الصقور الاستخبارية العراقية
- Common name: Falcons
- Abbreviation: FIC

Agency overview
- Formed: 8 February 2006
- Employees: Classified
- Annual budget: Classified

Jurisdictional structure
- Legal jurisdiction: Republic of Iraq
- Governing body: Ministry of Interior
- General nature: Civilian police; Secret police

Operational structure
- Headquarters: Baghdad, Iraq
- Elected officer responsible: Ali al-Zaidi, Prime Minister of Iraq
- Agency executive: (Classified), Director
- Parent agency: Federal Intelligence and Investigations Agency (Iraq)
- Units: Operational divisions: Counterterrorism Unit; Covert Operations Unit; Organized Crime Unit; Law Enforcement Unit

Website
- Official website

The Falcons Intelligence Cell (FIC; Arabic: خلية الصقور الاستخبارية) is an operational arm of the Federal Intelligence and Investigations Agency of the Iraqi ministry of interior. The Falcons Intelligence Cell has been dubbed "the most dangerous spy network" in Iraq and is trained by the CIA and the MI6. FIC has carried out hundreds of successful operations against militants, rivaling other Iraqi intelligence services in Iraq in terms of scope and prowess.

Officials stated that the Falcons are responsible for foiling hundreds of attacks on important cities in Iraq during the War in Iraq (2013-2017).

== History ==
In 2006, the intelligence unit was created with the mission of eliminating leaders of hostile groups. The unit was named "Al-Suquor", or "The Falcons." They became known in the public for operations involving Captain Harith al-Sudani, in which Falcons foiled around 30 car-bomb attacks on Baghdad. The Falcons were praised by U.S. services for infiltrating ISIS cells, killing or arresting leaders and members, preventing attacks and destroying weapons. According to The New York Times, the Iraqi counter-terrorism intelligence unit "May be the most important organization on the front lines of the war on terrorism that almost no one has heard of."

== Missions ==
The Falcons counter-terrorism operations typically involved Captain Harith al-Sudani infiltrating ISIS during the War in Iraq 2013-2017, driving ISIS's car bombs to important cities, letting the Falcon bomb disposal team dismantle the bombs and replacing them with pyrotechnic devices, and then dropping the car at the target point. There, Falcons would create a fake car bombing, including Falcons agents posing as victims, and photos and fake security briefs sent to news organizations. Captain Al-Sudani would then be picked up by ISIS agents and return with them, continuing his infiltration mission.

Al-Sudani was described as "Iraq’s most successful spy" while operating within the Falcons unit.

In December 2025, FIC conducted an airborne operation deep within Syrian territory and arrested two terrorists wanted by the Iraqi judiciary.

== Notable people ==
- Harith al-Sudani (1981–August 2017)
