= Abu Tahsin al-Salihi =

Iraqi sniper (1953–2017)

Abu Tahsin al-Salihi Sniper
- أبو تحسين الصالحي
- Born: Ali Jiyad Obaid al-Salihi; 1 July 1953; Basra, Kingdom of Iraq
- Died: 29 September 2017 (age 64); Hawija, Iraq
- Military career
- Allegiance: Ba'athist Iraq; Iraq
- Branch: Iraqi Ground Forces (1973–2003)
- Service years: 1973–2003; 2014–2017
- Nicknames: Sheikh of Snipers, Hawk Eye
- Unit: Popular Mobilization Forces (2014–17)
- Conflicts: Yom Kippur War; Second Iraqi–Kurdish War; Iran–Iraq War; Invasion of Kuwait; Gulf War; Iraq War; 2003 invasion of Iraq; War in Iraq (2013–17); Battle of Hawija †

Abu Tahsin al-Salihi (Arabic: أبو تحسين الصالحي; 1 July 1953 – 29 September 2017) was an Iraqi veteran sniper. A volunteer in the Iraqi Popular Mobilization Forces, he is credited with killing over 384 ISIS members during the War in Iraq (2013–2017), receiving the nicknames "The Sheikh of Snipers" and "Hawk Eye." Consequently, he is considered one of the deadliest snipers in history.

Before the War in Iraq (2013–2017), al-Salihi was a soldier in the Iraqi Army and fought in the Yom Kippur War, the Iran–Iraq War, the invasion of Kuwait, the Gulf War, and the 2003 US invasion of Iraq. According to al-Salihi, in the Yom Kippur War he was part of an Iraqi brigade fighting Israeli forces in the Golan Heights. Around May 2015 al-Salihi joined the Popular Mobilization Forces and was stationed in the Makhoul Mountains in northern Iraq, armed with a Steyr anti materiel rifle. Al-Salihi began fighting ISIS at the Battle of Jurf Al Nasr. He was killed in action during the Battle of Hawija in September 2017. He was trained in his sniper skills by the Russian military.

== Early life ==
Abu Tahsin al-Salihi was born Ali Jiyad Obaid al-Salihi (Arabic: علي جياد عبيد الصالحي) and was known by his nom de guerre The Hawk Eye or teknonym Abu Tahsin. He was born in 1953, had eleven children, five girls and six boys. He was a Shia Muslim. He traveled to Kuwait in the 1970s and worked many jobs there, two of which were being a shepherd of cows and camels. He had a French rifle to protect himself and with which he hunted rabbits, from this he gained knowledge in hunting and shooting.

== Military career ==
Months before the Yom Kippur War in the 1970s, he was nominated to travel to the Soviet Union to train in a course and took second place. The first war he fought in was the Yom Kippur War in 1973, where he was stationed in the Golan Heights with the 5th Mountain Brigade. The second war he fought in was the Second Kurdish–Iraqi War in 1974. Following the outbreak of the War in Iraq in late 2013 and ISIL's Northern Iraq offensive, he joined the Sadr Brigade in the Popular Mobilization Forces where he participated in several battles that liberated several provinces in Iraq. However, he did not fit well in the Sadr Brigade, and he then joined the Ali Al Akbar Brigade which is where his skills began to show. He had 384 confirmed kills.

== Death ==
According to the Popular Mobilization Forces spokesman, al-Salihi was killed in action after being shot in the face, supposedly by an enemy sniper, during the anti-ISIS offensive against Hawija, Iraq. His funeral took place on 30 September 2017.

== Legacy ==
In 2023, a statue of Abu Tahsin was erected in the city of Nasiriyah, Iraq.

== See also ==
- Abu Azrael
- Harith al-Sudani
- Salam Jassem Hussein
