= Nature Iraq =

Iraq's first and only conservation group

Nature Iraq (Arabic: طبيعة العراق, romanized: Ṭabīʻat al-ʻIrāq) is Iraq's first and only environmental conservation group. It is an Iraqi non-governmental organization, accredited to the United Nations Environment Programme (UNEP) and affiliated to BirdLife International. They seek to protect, restore, and preserve Iraq's natural environment and the rich cultural heritage that depends upon it. They conduct major work in sustainable development, biodiversity, and water resources. Nature Iraq was founded in 2003 by Azzam Alwash, an Iraqi refugee and engineer in the United States who returned to Iraq following the 2003 invasion of Iraq.

== Programs ==
The Key Biodiversity Areas (KBA) Program was initiated by Nature Iraq in partnership with the Iraqi Ministry of Environment and BirdLife International and other international advisory groups and included extensive field survey work from 2004 to 2010 to identify areas of the country that are globally important for their biological diversity. Eighty-two sites have been identified as KBAs in Iraq.

Adobe House was built to demonstrate alternative, low-cost and sustainable building methods that could be applied to alternative housing in the marshland areas.

The Darwin Project conducts plants and birds’ surveys, creates biodiversity and land use maps, facilitate practical field training courses and an online course for developing professionals, conducts educational activities with school children, creates field guides and other educational resources for conservation managers.

Wetlands Restoration has been ongoing. Nature Iraq has successfully re-created some of Iraq's freshwater marshes in the central part of the country.

The Blue Horizons Laboratories is a private lab offering environmental lab services that was initially started by Nature Iraq.

Waterkeepers Iraq was a program originally started by Nature Iraq but registered as an independent non-governmental organization in 2014. It advocates and works to protect the rivers, streams and waterways of Iraq and supports local communities in the sustainable use of these natural resources. Waterkeepers Iraq is affiliated with the international Waterkeeper Alliance. And is the first waterkeeper organization in the Middle East.

== See also ==
- Environmental issues in Iraq
