= Akkas gas field =

Gas field in Al Anbar Governorate, Iraq

Akkas
- Country: Iraq
- Region: Al Anbar Governorate
- Offshore/onshore: onshore
- Operator: Korea Gas Corporation

Field history
- Discovery: 1992
- Start of production: 1993

Production
- Current production of gas: 11.4×10^{6} m^{3}/d 400×10^{6} cu ft/d 4.2×10^{9} m^{3}/a (150×10^{9} cu ft/a)
- Recoverable gas: 160×10^{9} m^{3} 5.6×10^{12} cu ft

The Akkas gas field is an Iraqi natural gas field that was discovered in 1992. It began production in 1993 and produces natural gas and condensates. The total proven reserves of the Akkas gas field are around 5.6 trillion cubic feet (160 billion m^{3}) and production is slated to be around 400 million cubic feet/day (11.4 million m^{3}). On May 25, 2023, it was announced that Saudi Aramco will invest and develop Akkas gas field that could produce more than 400 million cubic feet of gas per day.
