= Mehdi Al-Khalissi =

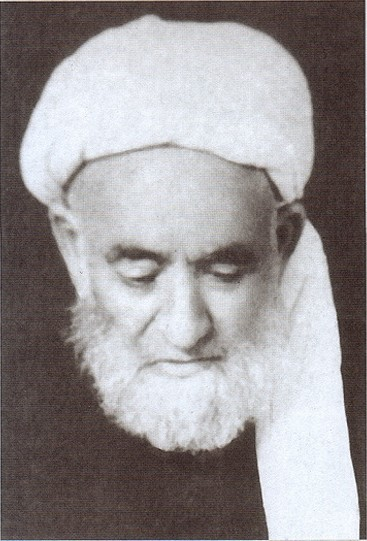

Sheikh Mahdi Al-Khalissi, also known as Mohammad Mahdi Al-Khalissi and Mahdi Al-Khalisi, (died 1925) was a prominent religious leader in Iraq during the British period of the early 20th century. At the time he was the Supreme Marja (Shia scholar and spiritual leader) in Iraq. He was also a professor and the head of the College of Divinity at Kadhimiya, Baghdad, Iraq.

== Biography ==
In 1920, Sheikh Mahdi Al-Khalissi played a leading role in the Iraqi revolt of 1920. In 1922 he issued a fatwa telling his followers and all Shiites in Iraq not to participate in the upcoming elections, so that they would not give legitimacy to a government established by foreign forces. Many Iraqis chose to answer his call and refrained from participating in the elections.

This led to the failure of the elections. The British authorities attempted to deport Al-Khalissi to Bombay, India, but a large group of Indian Muslims arrived at the ports, forcing the British to leave Al-Khalissi on the ship and transfer him elsewhere, for fear of him becoming a leader to the Indian community. He was then transferred to a port in Aden.

There he received an invitation from Sharif Hussein, ruler of Mecca, to attend Hajj (Muslim pilgrimage to Mecca). After Hajj, Al-Khalissi received an invitation from the Iranian minister of foreign affairs Mohammed Mosaddeq to come to Iran, where many religious leaders from Najaf would be waiting for him. Sheikh Mahdi Al-Khalissi was welcomed at the Iranian port of Bushehr, but an official of the Iranian Oil Company attempted to assassinate him by firing ten shots at him. Later, Al-Khalissi rejected King Faisal's offer for exiled religious leaders to return to Iraq, providing they did not interfere in politics.

In 1925, Al-Khalissi suddenly died in the city of Mashhad.
