= Azzam Alwash =

Iraqi engineer

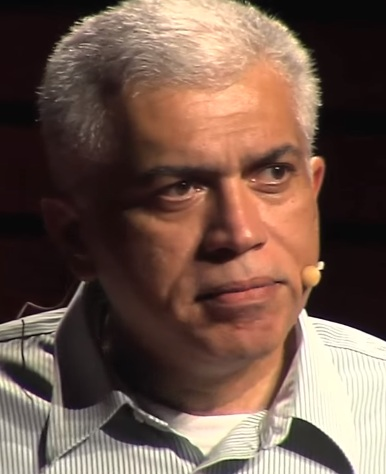
- Azzam Alwash, TEDTalentSearch, 3 July 2012
- Born: 1958 (age 67–68); Kut, Iraq
- Education: California State University, Fullerton (B.S. in civil engineering); University of Southern California (Ph.D. in geotechnical engineering)
- Occupation: Geotechnical engineer
- Awards: Goldman Environmental Prize (2013)

Azzam Alwash (born 1958; in Arabic: عزام علواش ʻAzām ʻAlwāš) is an Iraqi geotechnical engineer and environmentalist. He was awarded the Goldman Environmental Prize in 2013, in particular for his efforts on restoring salt marshes in southern Iraq that had been destroyed during the Saddam Hussein regime.

Alwash left Iraq in 1978 at the age of 20 because he refused to join the ruling Ba'ath Party. Halfway through an engineering degree, Alwash moved to Los Angeles, California and continued his studies. Following the 2003 invasion, Alwash returned to Iraq and set up a non-profit, Nature Iraq, to focus on restoring the salt marshes of southern Iraq.
