= Namaa Alward =

Iraqi actress and political activist

Namaa Alward (born 11 November 1953) is an Iraqi actress and political activist who is well known in Iraq. She was forced to flee her homeland in the 1980s and sought refugee status in Norway, along with her two sons.

Alward was highly active in the resistance movement against Saddam Hussein in the 1970s and 1980s. Namaa comes from a Shi'a family. She also has two Sunni brothers-in-law. She also has family back home in Baghdad. When questioned about US policy and the recent US-led invasion of Iraq, she replied, "Let them end the sanctions, stop this crazy war and allow us Iraqis sort out our own problems." She currently works in theater and film along with participating in numerous humanitarian organisations.

Alward traveled to Iraq in 2003 as a participant in the human shield action to Iraq.

== Filmography ==
- Mørketid (1995)
