= War in Iraq (2013–2017) =

Armed Conflict in the Middle East

- Part of the Iraqi conflict, spillover of the Syrian civil war, War against the Islamic State, and the war on terror
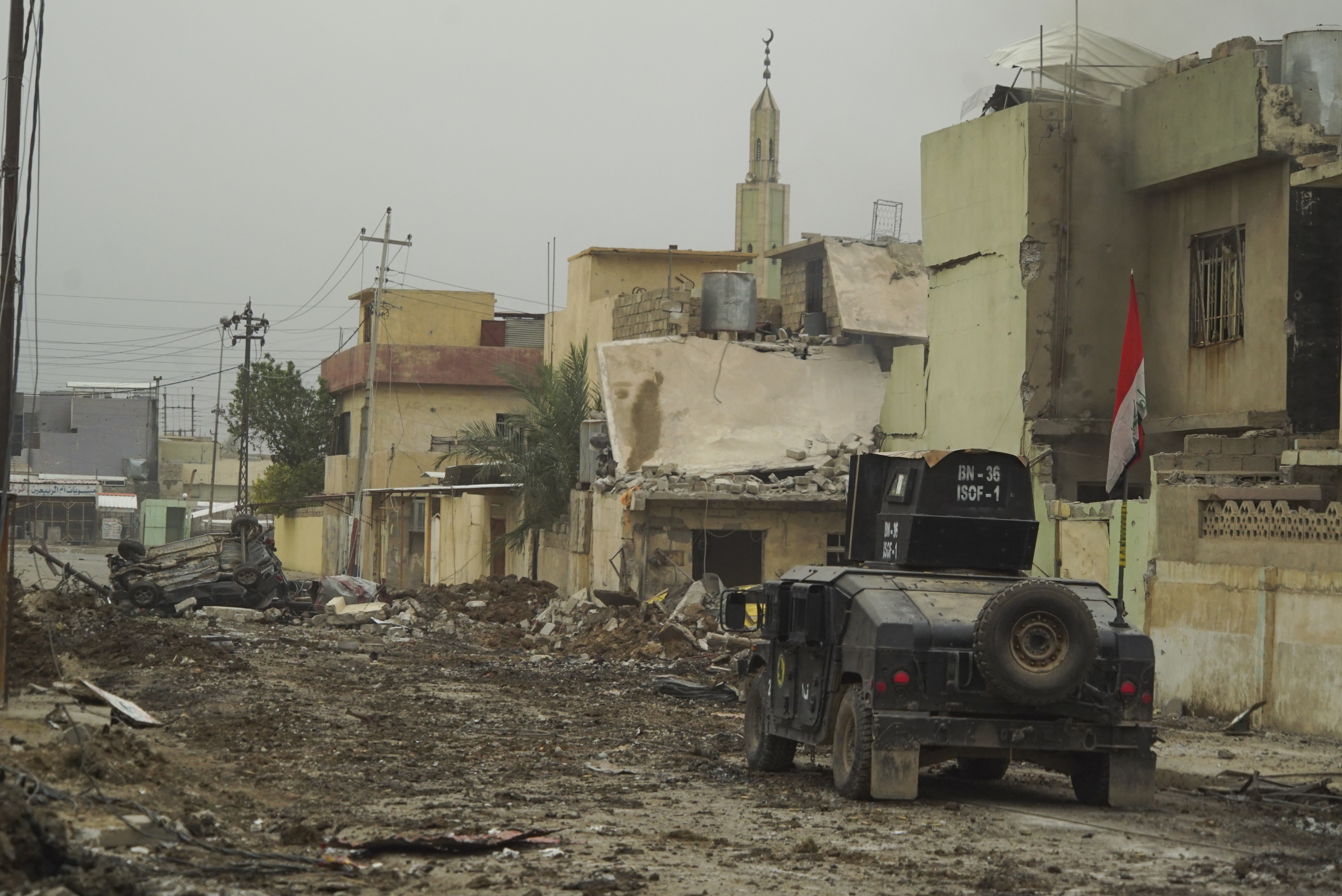
- An Iraqi Special Operations Forces (ISOF) Humvee on the street of Mosul, Northern Iraq, 16 November 2016 during the Battle of Mosul
Date	30 December 2013 – 9 December 2017 (3 years, 11 months, 1 week and 2 days)
Location	Iraq
Result	Iraqi–allied victory

Main belligerents
Iraqi government; Iraqi Armed Forces; Iraqi Ground Forces; Iraqi Air Force; CTS-ISOF; Popular Mobilization Forces; Assyrian Forces (Iraqi command); Federal Police; Kurdistan Region; Peshmerga; Zeravani; Kurdistan Region Security Council; CTG Kurdistan; Parastin u Zanyari; Assyrian Forces (Kurdish command); Tribal Mobilization; Nineveh guards; Allied groups: Sinjar Alliance; PKK; Rojava; Kurdish National Council; Iraqi Turkmen Front; Iraqi Communist Party; Various self-defense groups; Iran; Hezbollah; Liwa Zainebiyoun; Syria CJTF–OIR; United States; United Kingdom; Canada; Australia; France; Italy; Netherlands; New Zealand; Finland; Denmark	Islamic State Sunni insurgent factions (2013–2015): (Ba'athist Iraq) Naqshbandi Army (2013–2015); Free Iraqi Army (2013–2014); Islamic Army in Iraq (2013–2014); Anbar Tribal Council (2013–2015)

Commanders and leaders
Nouri al-Maliki (Note: 2013–2014); Haider al-Abadi (Note: 2014–2017); Massoud Barzani	Abu Bakr al-Baghdadi; Abu Ali al-Anbari †; Abu Ayman al-Iraqi † (Ba'athist Iraq) Izzat Ibrahim al-Douri

Units involved
See order	See order

Strength
(Iraq) Iraqi security forces: 600,000 (300,000 Army and 300,000 Police); Popular Mobilization Forces: 60,000–90,000: Badr Organisation: 10,000; Turkmen Brigades: 30,000; Contractors: 7,000 Peshmerga: 150,000 Tribal Mobilization: 50,000 US Forces: 5,000; Canadian Forces: 600; French Forces: 500; Italian Forces: 500; British Forces: 500	Islamic State: 20,000–100,000 fighters

Casualties and losses
Iraqi security forces and militias: 19,000+ killed and 29,000+ wounded Peshmerga: 1,837 killed 10,546 wounded 62 missing or captured Kurdistan Workers' Party: 180 killed (2014–Jan. 2016) Iran: IRGC: 43 killed; Liwa Zainebiyoun: 3 killed; CJTF–OIR: 57 killed (44 non-hostile), 58 wounded; 1 killed (non-hostile); 1 killed (friendly fire); 1 killed; 1 killed (non-hostile); Total: 21,124 dead and 39,546 wounded	Islamic State: 38,541+ killed 5,700 captured
- 67,376 civilians killed (Iraq body count figures); 5,625,024 displaced (IOM Iraq figures)

The War in Iraq (2013–2017) also known in Iraq as “حرب داعش" translating to “the war against the Islamic State” was an armed conflict between Iraq and its allies and the Islamic State. Following December 2013, the insurgency escalated into a full-scale war following clashes in parts of western Iraq, which culminated in the Islamic State offensive into Iraq in June 2014, leading to the capture of the cities of Mosul, Tikrit and other cities in western and northern Iraq by the Islamic State. Between 4–9 June 2014, the city of Mosul was attacked and later fell; following this, Prime Minister Nouri al-Maliki called for a national state of emergency on 10 June. However, despite the security crisis, Iraq's parliament did not allow Maliki to declare a state of emergency; many legislators boycotted the session because they opposed expanding the prime minister's powers. Ali Ghaidan, a former military commander in Mosul, accused al-Maliki of being the one who issued the order to withdraw from the city of Mosul. At its height, ISIL held 56,000 square kilometers of Iraqi territory, containing 4.5 million citizens.

The war resulted in the forced resignation of al-Maliki in 2014, as well as an airstrike campaign by the United States and a dozen other countries in support of the Iraqi military, participation of American and Canadian troops (predominantly special forces) in ground combat operations, a $3.5 billion U.S.-led program to rearm the Iraqi security forces, a U.S.-led training program that provided training to nearly 200,000 Iraqi soldiers and police, the participation of the military of Iran, including troops as well as armored and air elements, and military and logistical aid provided to Iraq by Russia. On 9 December 2017, Prime Minister Haider al-Abadi announced victory over the Islamic State. The Islamic State switched to guerrilla "hit and run" tactics in an effort to undermine the Iraqi government's effort to eradicate it. This conflict is interpreted by some in Iraq as a spillover of the Syrian civil war. Other Iraqis and observers see it mainly as a culmination of long-running local sectarianism, exacerbated by the 2003–2011 Iraq War, the subsequent increase in anti-Sunni sectarianism under Prime Minister al-Maliki, and the ensuing bloody crack-down on the 2012–2013 Iraqi protests.

== Belligerents ==
The Iraqi Armed Forces, Kurdish Peshmerga, Sunni insurgent and tribal groups and various Turkmen Muslim, Assyrian Christian, Yezidi, Shabaki, and Armenian Christian forces faced the Islamic State of Iraq and the Levant. Although some 35,000 Kurdish Peshmerga were incorporated into the Iraqi Armed Forces, most Peshmerga forces operated under the command of the President of Kurdistan Region in the federal Kurdistan Region of Iraq. Assyrian forces included: Nineveh Plain Protection Units, Nineveh Plain Forces, Babylon Brigades, Kataib Rouh Allah Issa Ibn Miriam, Qaraqosh Protection Committee and Dwekh Nawsha.

== History ==
=== 2014 ===
In the course of their Anbar campaign, ISIL militants and their Baathist allies seized at least 70% of Al Anbar Governorate by June 2014, including the cities of Fallujah, Al Qaim, and half of the provincial capital of Ramadi. ISIL forces also infiltrated Abu Ghraib in Baghdad Governorate.

In early June 2014, following further large-scale offensives in Iraq, ISIL and their allies seized control of Mosul, the second most populous city in Iraq, the nearby town of Tal Afar and most of the surrounding Nineveh Governorate. ISIL also captured parts of Kirkuk and Diyala Governorates and Tikrit, the administrative center of the Salahuddin Governorate, with the ultimate goal of capturing Baghdad, the Iraqi capital. ISIL was believed to have only 2,000–3,000 fighters up until the Mosul campaign, but during that campaign, it became evident that this number was a gross underestimate. There were also reports that the number of Sunni groups in Iraq that were opposed to the predominantly Shia government had joined ISIL, thus bolstering the group numbers. However, the Kurds—who are mostly Sunnis—in the northeast of Iraq, were unwilling to be drawn into the conflict, and there were clashes in the area between ISIL and the Kurdish Peshmerga.

On 12 June 2014 ISIL killed 1,700 unarmed Iraqi Air Force cadets who were caught trying to flee to safety and released many images of mass executions via its Twitter feed and various websites.

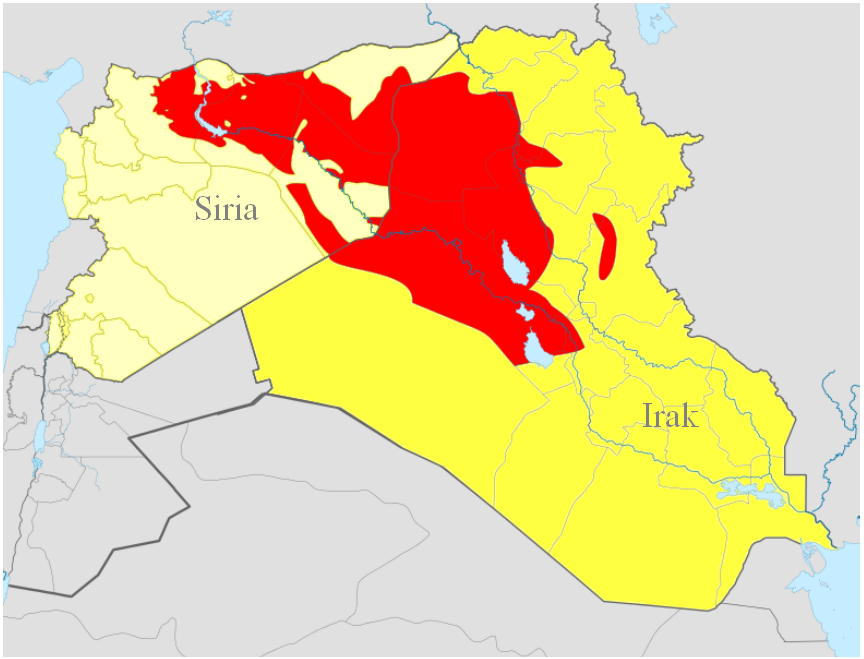
ISIL territory (red) in Iraq and Syria by mid-2014

In late June, ISIL militants captured two key crossings in Anbar, a day after seizing the border crossing at Al-Qaim. According to analysts, capturing these crossings could aid ISIL in transporting weapons and equipment to different battlefields. Two days later, the Syrian Air Force bombed ISIL positions in Iraq near the Al-Qaim border post. Iraqi Prime Minister Nouri al-Maliki stated: "There was no coordination involved, but we welcome this action. We welcome any Syrian strike against Isis because this group targets both Iraq and Syria."

At this point, The Jerusalem Post reported that the Obama administration had requested US$500 million from the U.S. Congress to use in the training and arming of "moderate" Syrian rebels fighting against the Syrian government, in order to counter the growing threat posed by ISIL in Syria and Iraq.

On 29 June, ISIL announced the establishment of a new caliphate. Abu Bakr al-Baghdadi was appointed its caliph, and group formally changed its name to the Islamic State. Four days later, Abu Bakr al-Baghdadi, the self-proclaimed caliph of the new Islamic State, said that Muslims should unite to capture Rome in order to "own the world." He called on Muslims all over the world to unite behind him as their leader.

On 24 July, ISIL blew up the Mosque and tomb of the Prophet Yunus (Jonah) in Mosul, with no reported casualties. Residents in the area said that ISIL had erased a piece of Iraqi heritage. Jonah's tomb was an important holy site in the Jewish heritage as well. A few days later, ISIL also blew up the Nabi Shiyt (Prophet Seth) shrine in Mosul. Sami al-Massoudi, deputy head of the Shia endowment agency which oversees holy sites, confirmed the destruction and added that ISIL had taken artifacts from the shrine to an unknown location.

In an August offensive, ISIL captured Sinjar after it was abandoned by the Peshmerga, and a number of other towns in the north of the country. Almost 200,000 civilians, mostly Yazidis, managed to flee from the fighting in Sinjar city, about 50,000 of them fled into the Sinjar Mountains, where they were trapped without food, water or medical care, facing starvation and dehydration. They had been threatened with death if they refused conversion to Islam. A UN representative said that "a humanitarian tragedy is unfolding in Sinjar." In addition, during this latest offensive, the Islamic State advanced to within 30 km of the Iraqi Kurdish capital of Erbil in northern Iraq.

Prompted by the siege and killings of the Yazidis, on 7 August, President Obama authorized targeted airstrikes in Iraq against ISIL, along with airdrops of aid. The UK offered the U.S. assistance with surveillance and refueling, and planned humanitarian airdrops to Iraqi refugees. The U.S. asserted that the systematic destruction of the Yazidi people by the Islamic State was genocide. The Arab League also accused the Islamic State of committing crimes against humanity.

On 13 August, U.S. airstrikes and Kurdish ground forces broke the ISIL siege of Mount Sinjar. Also, five days later, Iraqi Special Operations Forces with Kurdish Peshmerga and U.S. air support, overran ISIL militants and reclaimed the Mosul Dam.

On 31 August, the United States, France, United Kingdom and Australia began humanitarian aid drops of food, water and medical supplies to help prevent a potential massacre against the Shia Turkmen minority in Amirli. The U.S. also carried out air strikes on ISIL positions around and near Amirli. Iraqi officials stated that they had reached Amirli and broken the siege and that the military was fighting to clear the areas around the town. This is known to be the first major turning point against ISIL in Iraq.

In September, the United States sent an additional 250 troops to protect American personnel, while the first engagement of the British military against ISIL targets took place when a British Panavia Tornado jet dropped a Paveway IV bomb on "a heavy weapon position" operated by ISIL in northwest Iraq at the end of the month. In addition, Australia offered 200 special forces to the Kurds and 600 Australian troops landed in the UAE. The following month, Australia authorized its special forces troops to go to Iraq as part of the anti-ISIL coalition that day, as well as authorizing airstrikes.

In mid-October ISIL forces captured the city of Hīt after the 300-strong Iraqi Army garrison abandoned and set fire to its local base and supplies. As a result, an estimated 180,000 civilians (including refugees of the previous Anbar offensive) attempted to flee the area. Later that month, Operation Ashura was launched by Iraqi forces and Iranian-backed Shia militias, scoring a major victory and retaking the strategic town of Jurf al-Sakhar near Baghdad, and securing the way for millions of Shia pilgrims who were going to Karbala and Najaf On the Day of Ashura. Kurdish forces, meanwhile, recaptured Zummar.

On 21 October, ISIL seized terrain north of the Sinjar Mountains, thus cutting the area's escape route to Kurdish areas. The Yazidi militias then withdrew from there into the mountains, where the number of Yazidi civilian refugees was estimated at 2,000–7,000. The mountains had once again been partially surrounded by ISIL.

In mid-November, the Iraqi army retook control of most of the strategic city Baiji from the Islamic State and broke the siege of the nearby oil refinery. However, by the following month, ISIL recaptured Baiji and reestablished the siege of the refinery.

On 17 December, Peshmerga forces, backed by 50 US-led coalition airstrikes on ISIL positions, launched an offensive to liberate Sinjar and to break the partial ISIL siege of the Sinjar Mountains. In less than two days, the siege was broken. After ISIL forces retreated, Kurdish fighters were initially faced with the clearing out mines around the area, but quickly opened a land corridor to those mountains, enabling Yazidis to be evacuated. The operation left 100 ISIL fighters dead.

Later on 21 December, Syrian Kurdish YPG fighters south of the mountain range reached Peshmerga lines, thus linking their two fronts. The next day, the YPG broke through ISIL lines, thus opening a corridor from Syria to the town of Sinjar. By the evening, the Peshmerga took control of much of Sinjar.

=== 2015 ===
In late January 2015, the Iraqi armed forces recaptured the entire province of Diyala from the Islamic State. Furthermore, 21 January saw the launching of the Mosul offensive in which Peshmerga forces captured large amount of territory surrounding Mosul.

On 2 March, the Second Battle of Tikrit began and after more than a month of hard fighting, Iraqi government troops and pro-Iranian Shiite militias overcame ISIL fighters and took Tikrit. Shia groups claimed that they had killed Izzat Ibrahim al-Douri but this was later debunked This success was off-set in late May, by ISIL's capture of the provincial capital of Ramadi in Anbar Governorate.

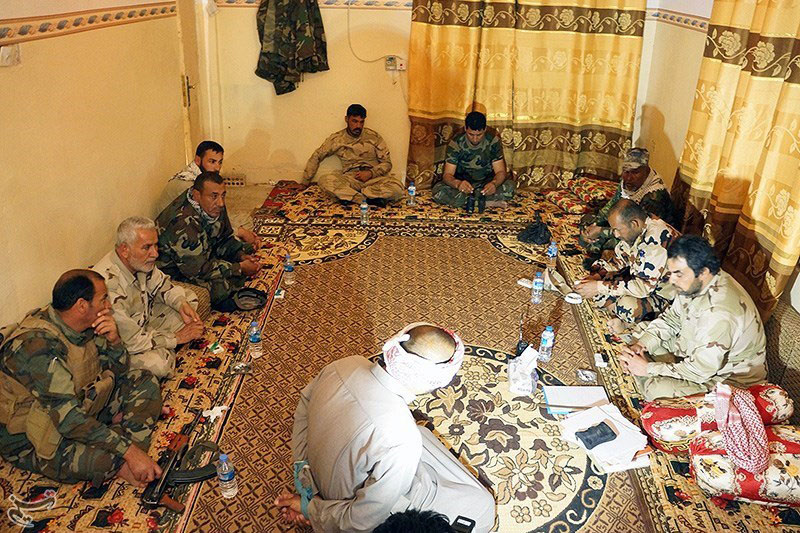
Captured ISIL militant is guarded by PMF fighters after counter-insurgency operations in Saladin Governorate, April 2015

On 17 July, a suicide bomber detonated a car bomb in a crowded marketplace in the city of Khan Bani Saad during Eid al-Fitr celebrations, killing 120–130 people and injuring 130 more. Twenty more people were reported missing since the bombing.

On 13 August, a suicide bomber detonated a truck bomb in a crowded marketplace in Sadr City, Baghdad, killing at least 75 people and injuring 212 more. On 27 August, a suicide bomber assassinated General Abdel Rahman Abu Ragheef, deputy commander of operations in the province of Anbar, and Brigadier Safeen Abdel Majeed, a divisional commander.

ISIL forces lost Sinjar on November 13 to Kurdish forces.

During 16–17 December, ISIL forces mounted a major offensive north-east of Mosul against Kurdish position but were repelled. Starting December 22, the Iraqi Army began a campaign to recapture Ramadi. On December 28, Iraq declared Ramadi liberated from ISIL forces and under the control of the Iraqi government.

=== 2016 ===
Iraqi armed forces regained control of Hīt and Ar-Rutbah in offensive operations in 2016 and then Fallujah as well in the Third Battle of Fallujah ending in June 2016.

On 16 October 2016, the Battle of Mosul began.

=== 2017 ===
The 2017 Mosul massacre was the largest single death toll inflicted by a coalition air strike since the 2003 invasion of Iraq by U.S. forces.

In April, the Iraqi Army, with the help of the Popular Mobilization Forces, launched the Western Nineveh offensive to capture territory west of Mosul. The PMU were able to reach the Iraq–Syria border, meeting up with territory controlled by the Syrian Democratic Forces.

In May, a member from the Canadian Special Forces Joint Task Force 2 disrupted a Daesh attack on Iraqi security forces. The target was successfully hit at 3,540 metres from a high-rise, setting the world's longest recorded sniper kill.

On 10 July, Iraqi Army forces captured Mosul. Following the victory in Mosul, the Iraqi Army launched operations to sweep what remained of ISIL-controlled territory in the country. The Tal Afar offensive was launched on 20 August and completed by 31 August with a major Iraqi Army victory. The Hawija offensive started in late September and was complete by 5 October.

In September 2017, a United Nations Security Council Resolution was adopted to "Reaffirm its respect for the sovereignty, territorial integrity, independence and unity of Iraq". Following the adoption of the resolution, a UN investigative team was established to document human rights violations and serious crimes committed by ISIS in Iraq. However, by the end of 2018, the team had not yet launched its investigation.

On 25 September, Kurdistan Region held an independence referendum. Turnout was reported to be 72.83% with 92.73% voting in favor of independence from Iraq. In response to the referendum, the Iraqi Army launched a short offensive on 15 October against Kurdistan Region to recapture the disputed city of Kirkuk with the help of the Talabani family and some PUK members. Following the defeat of the Peshmerga and the capture of Kirkuk and Sinjar by the Iraqi armed forces, Masoud Barzani announced his intentions to step down as President of Kurdistan Region, effective 1 November, after being in power for 12 years. His gamble of pushing through with the referendum ended with the disputed territories being recaptured by Iraq and with the Kurdish statebuilding project being left abandoned.

Iraq captured ISIL's last two strongholds of Al-Qa'im and Rawah on 17 November. After the Iraqi army had captured the last ISIL-held areas in the al-Jazira desert bordering Syria, on 9 December the prime minister announced the end of the war. A victory parade was held "in Baghdad's heavily fortified Green Zone" on the following day, and Prime Minister al-Abadi declared that 10 December would become a new annual holiday for Iraq. However, other government officials and sources, such as the Australian Government, British Defence Secretary Gavin Williamson, and Reuters, warned that they expected ISIL to fight on by other means, such as guerilla warfare and terrorism. Despite the victory announcements, ISIL retained its natural hideouts in Wadi Hauran.

== Aftermath ==
Although the war was declared over, ISIL continued a lower-scale insurgency.

Months of relative calm in Baghdad ended with over 27 people killed by suicide bombers over a period of 3 days in mid-January 2018. Although there were no immediate claims of responsibility, it was reported that such attacks had usually been the work of the jihadist group Islamic State (IS) in the past, and that elements of the group were still active north of the city despite the government's claim of victory in December 2017. On Wednesday January 17, two days after the two suicide bombings on January 15, IS "claimed responsibility for the twin suicide bombings in Baghdad this week", though the New York Times suggested that the delay, and a number of errors in the claim, may show that the group's "media apparatus has been disrupted".

The Times meanwhile reported on 16 January that the Iraqi Army had launched an operation to oust ISIL from the Bosifian islands, a stronghold being used as a militant hideout. The hideout, located in Saladin governorate, was discovered in December and is one of the 10 patches where the group is still active. About 100 militants were killed by Iraqi forces in the past one week. An operation was launched on 7 February to hunt down the remnants of ISIL in Saladin Governorate, as well as members of Ansar al-Sunna and the "White Flags", a new insurgent group reportedly consisting of former ISIL members and Kurdish mafia groups.

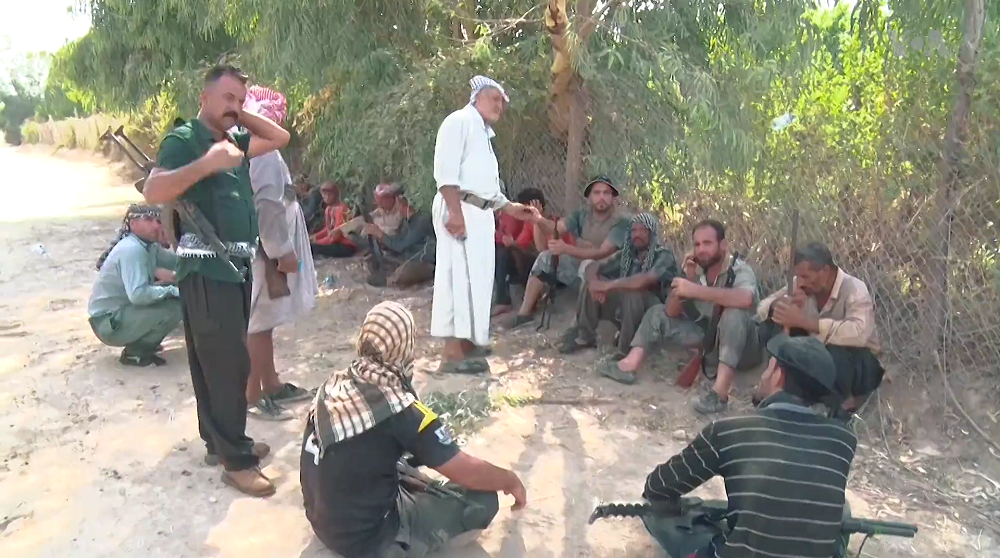
Fighters of a self-defense group in northeastern Iraq in June 2018. ISIL still has a presence in remote areas of the country, often attacking small villages and forcing the locals to fight or flee.

Despite these efforts, ISIL continued to hold out in the western desert and wage an insurgency campaign against government forces in northern Iraq by mid-2018, most notably in Diyala and Kirkuk Governorates. As the military could not protect the isolated hinterland of these regions, ISIL forces would repeatedly attack remote villages, defeating their self-defense groups, kidnap people for ransom and forcing local civilians to flee. Sometimes, ISIL fighters would even openly flaunt their presence, placing their flag at well visible points and driving around with motorcycles, cars, and technicals. The group also targeted followers of Yarsanism (called Kaka'i in Iraq) around Kirkuk, whom the militants consider unbelievers. In course of one notable attack, ISIL fighters raided a house in a village to the south of Shirqat on 11 March 2018, killing a tribal sheikh who led a Sunni militia against the group as well as three others. In July 2018, the Iraqi Army, Popular Mobilization Forces and Peshmerga launched Operation "Vengeance for the Martyrs" to destroy ISIL remnants in Diyala and Kirkuk Governorates, supported by the Iraqi Air Force and US-led coalition.

By April 2018, hundreds of ISIL fighters were still located in the Anbar desert.

Following ISIL's defeat, the group has regardless continued an insurgency. However they have been greatly weakened and violence in Iraq has been sharply reduced in 2018. Only 95 people died during the month of May, the lowest figure in 10 years.

A total of 7,366 of ISIL members have returned to their home countries, where some countries also agreed to bring unaccompanied children back. According to a study by the European Parliament in May 2018, around 30% of Western European ISIL members have returned to their countries, in which they would face a criminal investigation and risk assessment.

In May 2019, three ISIL Frenchmen named Kevin Gonot, Leonard Lopez and Salim Machou, were sentenced to death by an Iraqi court.

== Human rights ==
Nearly 19,000 civilians have been killed in Iraq in ISIL-linked violence between January 2014 and October 2015. ISIL executed up to 1,700 Shia Iraqi Air Force cadets from Camp Speicher near Tikrit on 12 June 2014. The genocide of Yazidis by ISIL has led to the expulsion, flight and effective exile of the Yazidi people from their ancestral lands in northern Iraq.

According to Newsweek, Amnesty International claimed that "Iraqi government forces and paramilitary militias have tortured, arbitrarily detained, forcibly disappeared and executed thousands of civilians who have fled the rule of the Islamic State militant group". The report, titled Punished for Daesh's crimes', alleges that thousands of Sunni men and boys have been forcibly disappeared by Iraqi government forces and militias.

== See also ==
- Casualties of the Iraqi insurgency (2011–present)
- American-led intervention in Iraq
- Iranian-led intervention in Iraq
- Military intervention against ISIL
- Ghost soldiers
- Falcons (anti-terrorism unit)
- Blowback (intelligence)
- Syrian Civil War
- 2014 Sinjar offensive
- Sinjar massacre
- Yazidi genocide
- Battle for Mosul Dam
- Operation Shader
- Opération Chammal
- Use of chemical weapons in the Iraqi Civil War
