= Multi-National Force West =

Multi-National Forces West
- The logo for MNF-W
- Active: March 2004 – January 23, 2010
- Disbanded: January 23, 2010
- Country: United States of America
- Allegiance: United States Marine Corps
- Branch: United States Marine Corps
- Type: Division
- Role: Expeditionary combat forces
- Size: 37,000 (Peak in February 2008)
- Part of: Multi-National Force – Iraq, Multi-National Corps – Iraq
- Garrison/HQ: Camp Fallujah (2004–2008); Al Asad Airbase (2008–2010)
- Engagements: Iraq War – Al Anbar campaign * Operation Vigilant Resolve * Operation Phantom Fury

Commanders
- Notable commanders: James T. Conway; John F. Kelly

Multi-National Forces West (MNF-W) or United States Forces West (USF-W) was one of the coalition headquarters under Multi-National Force-Iraq. It was headquartered by either I or II U.S. Marine Expeditionary Force that rotated on a 12-month basis. Their area of operations was primarily the Al Anbar province which includes the cities of Ar Ramadi, Fallujah, Al-Qa'im, and Haditha. The force was the most important U.S. unit to take part in the Iraq War in Al Anbar Governorate.

Among the smaller multinational units operating within MNF-W was a platoon from the Azerbaijani Armed Forces.

== Commanders ==
During the Iraq War, the Marine Corps regularly rotated command of MNF-W between the 1st and 2nd Marine Expeditionary Forces.

MEF	Commander	From	To
I MEF	James T. Conway	March 2004	September 2004
I MEF	John F. Sattler	September 2004	February 2005
II MEF	Stephen T. Johnson	February 2005	February 2006
I MEF	Richard C. Zilmer	February 2006	February 2007
II MEF	Walter Gaskin	February 2007	February 2008
I MEF	John F. Kelly	February 2008	February 2009
II MEF	Richard Tryon	February 2009	January 23, 2010

For convenience, these changes of command are listed below and the Marine command in MNF-W is simply referred to as "MEF":

I Marine Expeditionary Force
March 2004 – February 2005 (James T. Conway/John F. Sattler)
March 2006 – February 2007 (Richard C. Zilmer)
February 2008 – February 2009 (John F. Kelly)

II Marine Expeditionary Force
March 2005 – February 2006 (Stephen T. Johnson)
February 2007 – February 2008 (Walter Gaskin)
March 2009 – January 2010 (Richard T. Tryon)

As the Marine Corps withdrew from Al Anbar Governorate, by September 2009 they were replaced by a single brigade, the 1st Brigade of the 82nd Airborne Division. The brigade was bolstered with an additional 16 advisers, though this did not reach the 48 assigned advisors that were supposed to be part of an 'Advise and Assist' brigade.
