= Battle of Donkey Island =

Military engagement

- Part of the Iraq War
Date	30 June – 2 July 2007
Location	Ramadi, Iraq
Result	US victory

Belligerents
United States	Islamic State of Iraq

Units involved
1-77 Armor Regiment; 2nd Battalion 5th Marines; 1-149 Aviation Battalion	

Strength
30–50 soldiers	40–70 fighters

Casualties and losses
2 killed, 11 wounded	32 killed

The Battle of Donkey Island was a skirmish that occurred on 30 June and 1 July 2007 between elements of the U.S. Army Task Force 1-77 Armor Regiment, the 2nd Battalion 5th Marines and a numerically superior force of Islamic State of Iraq insurgents on the banks of a canal leading from Ramadi to Lake Habbaniyah in the Al Anbar province of Iraq.

Official reports of the clash indicate that the U.S. force suffered 2 soldiers dead and 11 wounded, while an estimated 32 insurgents were killed (out of an estimated force of 40–70 fighters). From a military perspective, the battle was a complete victory for the U.S. forces, which detected and defeated an insurgent force before it could launch a planned assault on Ramadi. From a political perspective, the action revealed the continuing ability of Islamic State of Iraq to plan and assemble forces in their attempt to destabilize the Anbar region.

== Battle ==
On the night of 30 June 2007, a routine patrol on the outskirts of Ramadi by elements of Charlie Company, TF 1-77 revealed the presence of a company-sized element of insurgent forces. Partially hidden behind two trucks, the insurgents began firing on the reconnaissance group, forcing them to retreat to nearby cover and calling for backup forces.

A platoon-sized element arrived a short while later to reinforce the American patrol. Although outnumbered, the U.S. force brought superior firepower to bear and eventually began to shift the tide of battle. With continuing ground fire, and later with air support, the American troops killed more than 30 insurgents and managed to destroy their two trucks carrying large quantities of weapons and ammunition before calm took over early in the morning.

On 1 July, elements of TF 1-77 were ordered to clear the banks of the canal and a small island known to US forces as Donkey Island to determine if any enemy forces remained in the area. While conducting their search, several US forces were ambushed by insurgent fighters armed with small arms and wearing suicide vests hiding amongst the dense brush who had not withdrawn with their comrades the night before. The ensuing firefight resulted in the deaths of two US Army Soldiers and the two attacking insurgent fighters, ending the battle for the day.

Believing that additional insurgent fighters may still be present in the area, a joint patrol of US and Iraqi forces conducted a thorough sweep of the field on the morning of 2 July, preempted by mortar fire on potential enemy positions from TF 1-77’s 120mm mortar platoon. In the following days, additional missions were conducted by the U.S. Army and the U.S. Marines on both sides of the canal to ensure all insurgent forces were eliminated.

== Insurgency ==
On February 13, 2007 around 23 men of the Army of the Men of the Naqshbandi Order seized a couple of villages in and around Ramadi, acting as a government they claimed that they have around 500 soldiers in Ramadi alone, and told remaining Iraqi forces that if they don't retreat from Ramadi, a battle of bloodshed will be fought. The remaining Iraqi forces in Ramadi hunted down the "hundreds" of soldiers only to find it was just one group of clandestine Tikritis, all of whom were arrested on February 15, 2007 only two days later.

== See also ==
- 2007 in Iraq
- Iraq War in Anbar Province
