= List of decorated Americans from the Iraq War in Al Anbar Governorate =

This is a list of United States Soldiers, Sailors, Airmen, and Marines who were decorated with one of the three highest courage awards of the United States Armed Forces, for heroism and gallantry during the Anbar campaign of the Iraq War in the Al Anbar Governorate:

- Medal of Honor, awarded by the United States government
- any of the collective service cross medals, each with a name unique to the service branch awarding them: (Note: Despite their branch related names, an action by any person, from any branch, in support of a branch other than their own, can result in that person being awarded a military cross by, and of, the branch they supported.)
  - Distinguished Flying Cross, awarded by the United States Department of the Air Force
  - Distinguished Service Cross, awarded by the United States Department of the Army
  - Navy Cross, awarded by the United States Department of the Navy
- Silver Star, awarded by any one of the above-mentioned departments

An asterisk after a recipient's name indicates that the award was given posthumously.

== Medal of Honor ==
Name	Rank	Award	Unit	Date of action	Location	Notes
Jason Dunham*	Corporal	Medal of Honor	3rd Battalion 7th Marines	April 22, 2004	Husaybah	Falling on a grenade to save nearby Marines in Karabilah.
Michael Monsoor*	Master-at-Arms Second Class	Medal of Honor	SEAL Team 3	September 29, 2006	Ramadi (Second Battle)	Falling on a grenade to save nearby sailors.

== Service Crosses ==
Name	Rank	Award	Unit	Date of action	Location	Notes
Richard Adams	Chief Warrant Officer Three	Distinguished Flying Cross	36th Combat Aviation Brigade	February 11, 2007	Ramadi	Placed himself in the direct line of enemy fire in order to protect a disabled waterborne patrol in the Euphrates River.
Christopher Adlesperger	Lance Corporal	Navy Cross	3rd Battalion 5th Marines	November 10, 2004	Fallujah (Second Battle)	Conducted one-man attack against group of insurgents, despite being wounded in the process. (Note: Lance Corporal Adlesperger was killed on a separate mission before the award could be presented.)
Daniel Briggs	Staff Sergeant	Distinguished Service Cross	United States Army Special Operations Command	April 26, 2004	Fallujah (First Battle)	Provided medical attention to US Marines during a firefight, executed evacuation of injured Marines while under direct enemy fire preventing further casualties.
Jason Clairday*	Corporal	Navy Cross	3rd Battalion 5th Marines	December 12, 2004	Fallujah (Second Battle)	Aggressive engagement of a platoon-sized enemy in close-quarters combat.
Willie Copeland	Sergeant	Navy Cross	1st Reconnaissance Battalion	April 7, 2004	Fallujah (First Battle)	Led five Marines in an attack through an open field to eliminate ten insurgents; shielded a wounded Marine with his own body while applying first aid.
Todd Corbin	Lance Corporal	Navy Cross	3rd Battalion, 25th Marines	May 7, 2005	Haditha	Evacuated five dead or wounded Marines under heavy enemy fire during an ambush.
Dominic Esquibel	Lance Corporal	Navy Cross	1st Battalion 8th Marines	November 25, 2004	Fallujah (Second Battle)	Engaged insurgents while simultaneously evacuating three wounded Marines under fire.
Benjamin Gonzalez	Lance Corporal	Navy Cross	2nd Battalion 1st Marines	June 18, 2004	Fallujah	Jumped on a fellow Marine to protect him from a grenade.
Jordan Haerter*	Lance Corporal	Navy Cross	1st Battalion 9th Marines	April 22, 2008	Ramadi	Died alongside Cpl Jonathan T. Yale (see below) defending his post against a suicide truck bomb, safeguarding the more than 50 Marines and Iraqi policemen within their security station.
Donald Hollenbaugh	Master Sergeant	Distinguished Service Cross	United States Army Special Operations Command	April 26, 2004	Fallujah (First Battle)	Defended position against enemy fighters during evacuation of wounded Marines in Fallujah.
Walter Jackson	Second Lieutenant	Distinguished Service Cross	1st Battalion, 36th Infantry Regiment	September 27, 2006	Ramadi (Second Battle)	For extraordinary courage on September 27, 2006, in Hīt, Iraq.
Bradley Kasal	First Sergeant	Navy Cross	3rd Battalion 1st Marines	November 13, 2004	Fallujah (Second Battle)	Directly led squad of Marines in heavy close-quarters urban combat, despite sustaining multiple wounds.
Jarrett Kraft	Sergeant	Navy Cross	3rd Battalion 5th Marines	December 23, 2004	Fallujah (Second Battle)	Personally led three assaults against enemy forces during a two-hour battle.
Aubrey McDade	Sergeant	Navy Cross	1st Battalion 8th Marines	November 11, 2004	Fallujah (Second Battle)	For single-handedly evacuating three wounded Marines in a close-quarters engagement.
Michael Mendoza	Sergeant	Navy Cross	1st Reconnaissance Battalion	April 7, 2004	Fallujah (First Battle)	Despite rocket and machine gun fire directed at him, knelt in the open, held his position and provided covering fire while a wounded Marine was being evacuated.
Robert Mitchell	Corporal	Navy Cross	3rd Battalion 1st Marines	November 13, 2004	Fallujah (Second Battle)	Fought off group of insurgents, including in hand-to-hand combat while simultaneously providing first aid for wounded Marines.
Joshua Mooi	Lance Corporal	Navy Cross	2nd Battalion 1st Marines	November 16, 2005	Ubaydi (Steel Curtain)	Helped save the lives of a dozen Marines while killing four insurgents in heavy close-quarters urban combat.
Brent Morel*	Captain	Navy Cross	1st Reconnaissance Battalion	April 7, 2004	Fallujah (First Battle)	Killed while personally leading a series of assaults against 40-60 insurgents.
Rafael Peralta*	Sergeant	Navy Cross	1st Battalion 3rd Marines	November 15, 2004	Fallujah (Second Battle)	Falling on a grenade to save nearby Marines.
Eric Smith	Corporal	Navy Cross	2nd Battalion 4th Marines	April 6, 2004	Ramadi (First Battle)	Under heavy machine gun and rocket-propelled grenade fire, assumed command of his platoon after his commanding officer was critically wounded and led his men to covered positions; ran back across the field of fire to evacuate the injured officer and then returned to the platoon and completed their mission to reinforce an isolated squad under attack.
Jeremiah Workman	Corporal	Navy Cross	3rd Battalion 5th Marines	December 23, 2004	Fallujah (Second Battle)	Personally led three separate assaults to rescue a group of trapped Marines, despite being wounded in the process, and killing twenty-four insurgents.
Jonathan Yale*	Corporal	Navy Cross	2nd Battalion 8th Marines	April 22, 2008	Ramadi	Died alongside LCpl Jordan C. Haerter (see above) defending his post against a suicide truck bomb, safeguarding the more than 50 Marines and Iraqi policemen within their security station.

== Silver Star ==
Name	Rank	Award	Unit	Date of action	Location	Notes
Elliot Ackerman	Second Lieutenant	Silver Star	1st Battalion 8th Marines	November 10, 2004	Fallujah (Second Battle)	Multiple instances of exposing himself to enemy fire, including while personally conducting MEDEVACs.
Thomas Adametz	Lance Corporal	Silver Star	2nd Battalion 1st Marines	April 26, 2004	Fallujah (First Battle)	Exposed himself to grenade and small arms fire in order to provide suppressive fire facilitating the evacuation of wounded Marines.
Jarred Adams	Corporal	Silver Star	1st Battalion 7th Marines	January 6, 2005	Husaybah	Suffering from multiple shrapnel wounds and burns after a direct hit from a rocket-propelled grenade on his vehicle, he jumped back inside the burning wreckage to retrieve the turret gunner and then carry him across an intersection while still under enemy fire.
Christopher Bronzi	Captain	Silver Star	2nd Battalion 4th Marines	April 6–7, 2004	Ramadi (First Battle)	Repeatedly exposed himself to intense small arms and rocket-propelled grenade fire while leading his company in the elimination of 250 insurgents during a two-day period, personally destroying several enemy fighting positions.
Steven Davis	Staff Sergeant	Silver Star	1st Battalion 8th Marines	November 9, 2004	Fallujah (Second Battle)	Exposed himself to a hail of enemy fire while sprinting to the aid of a wounded Marine and trying to move him to safety. When the Marine was wounded a second time and then he himself was also wounded, he shielded the injured Marine with his body until other Marines could come to their aid.
Eubaldo Lovato	Lance Corporal	Silver Star	1st Battalion 8th Marines	November 15, 2004	Fallujah (Second Battle)	With complete disregard for his own safety, and under intense enemy machine gun fire, he and several other non-commissioned officers eliminated the enemy with hand grenades and deadly accurate small arms fire at close range to retrieve a fallen Marine.
Brian Stann	Second Lieutenant	Silver Star	3rd Battalion 2nd Marines	May 8–14, 2005	Karabilah (Battle of Al-Qa'im)	Held the battle position of his platoon protecting the Task Force flank for six days, personally directing two casualty evacuations, three vehicle recovery operations and multiple close air support missions under enemy small arms, machine gun and mortar fire.
Robert Weiler	Captain	Silver Star	2nd Battalion 4th Marines	April 6–10, 2004	Ramadi (First Battle)	Repeatedly exposed himself to enemy fire while leading his company against tenacious adversary forces, personally leading squads as they assaulted enemy firing positions.
