= Fallujah killings of April 2003 =

By U.S. Army soldiers in Iraq

- Part of the 2003 invasion of Iraq
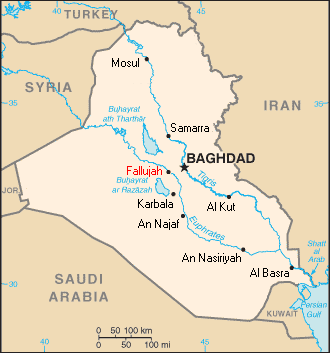
- Location: Fallujah, Iraq
- Date: April 28–30, 2003
- Attack type: Civilian killings
- Deaths: 20 local residents
- Injuries: 70+ local residents 3 U.S. Army soldiers
- Perpetrators: U.S. 82nd Airborne Division, U.S. 3rd Armored Cavalry Regiment
- Motive: Soldiers claimed to be under fire by gunman in the crowd, a claim investigated inconclusively by HRW

The Fallujah killings of April 2003 began when United States Army soldiers from the American 1st Battalion, 325th Infantry Regiment of the 82nd Airborne Division fired into a crowd of Iraqi civilians who were protesting their presence at a school in the city of Fallujah, killing 17 protestors.

== History ==
On the evening of April 28, 2003, several hundred civilians ignored a curfew imposed on them by the occupying U.S. military. They proceeded to march through the streets of Fallujah, past the soldiers positioned in the Ba'ath party headquarters. They wished to protest outside a local school about the United States military presence within. A U.S. Army Psychological Operations team attempted to force the civilians to disperse with announcements, but the team failed in this attempt. According to locals, at this point the United States soldiers fired upon the unarmed crowd, killing 17 and wounding more than 70 of the protesters. The U.S. suffered no casualties from the incident. According to the soldiers on the ground, the 82nd Airborne soldiers inside the school responded to "effective fire" from inside the protesting crowd. Human Rights Watch inspected the area after the incident, and were unable to conclusively identify evidence of bullet damage to the building where U.S. forces were based. Two days later, on April 30, the 82nd Airborne was replaced in the city by the U.S. 3rd Armored Cavalry Regiment. The 3rd Cavalry was significantly smaller in number and chose not to occupy the same schoolhouse where the shooting had occurred two days earlier. Seven members of the 82nd Airborne Division were hurt in a retaliatory grenade attack on the Ba'ath headquarters later that evening.

== See also ==
- Rules of Engagement, a 2000 film displaying a similar incident, albeit of U.S. Marines under perceived attack from a supposedly hostile crowd
