= 2009 Anbar car bombing campaign =

Anbar Governorate bombings, 2009

In 2009, following the withdrawal of US forces from Iraqi cities on 30 June, a campaign of car bomb attacks (including several suicide bombings) was conducted throughout Anbar Governorate. In early 2009, U.S. forces began pulling out of cities across the country, turning over the task of maintaining security to the Iraqi Army, police, and their paramilitary allies. Experts and many Iraqis worried that in the absence of U.S. soldiers, AQI might resurface and attempt mass-casualty attacks to destabilize the country. There was indeed a spike in the number of suicide attacks, and through mid and late 2009, the Islamic State of Iraq rebounded in strength and appeared to be launching a concerted effort to cripple the Iraqi government.

The first attack was on July 15, when six people (including five policemen) were killed and another 19 wounded in Ramadi when a suicide bomber driving a minibus struck a checkpoint of Iraqi soldiers and police. On July 21, a pair of car bombs were simultaneously detonated near a group of restaurants in Ramadi, killing 1-3 people and wounding 13-18. That same day a state of emergency was declared in Ramadi along with vehicle bans both there and in Fallujah. Four days later on July 25, four people were killed and another 12 wounded when a car bomb was detonated outside the offices of the Iraqi Islamic Party in Fallujah. On August 3, two car bombs hit the cities of Haditha and Saqlawiyah. The Haditha bomb targeted a crowded marketplace, killing seven civilians and wounding 20, while the Saqlawiyah attack unsuccessfully targeted the local police chief, but killed two civilians. On September 7, two car bombs were detonated against police checkpoints in Ramadi, killing seven (including three police) and wounding seventeen. Another car bomb attack against a police station in Ramadi on September 27 killed three police and wounded four. On October 6, a suicide car bomb was detonated near a residential compound in Fallujah, killing nine civilians and wounding 30.
