= Abdullah Abu Azzam al-Iraqi =

Abdallah Najim Abdallah Muhammad al-Juwari, also known as Abdullah Abu Azzam al-Iraqi (/ˈɑːbuː əˈzæm/ AH-boo ə-ZAM; (died 25 September 2005), was a senior leader in Al-Qaeda in Iraq (AQI).

== Life ==
Born in Iraq, he originally joined AQI's predecessor, Jama'at al-Tawhid wal-Jihad, becoming an aide to its leader Abu Musab al-Zarqawi. He was reported to be the number two leader and "chief financier" in AQI, and was also known as the emir of Anbar.

There was a reward of $50,000 offered for information leading to his death or capture. He was killed by the United States Army in a shootout in the Iraqi capital of Baghdad; according to army reports, he resisted arrest in an early morning raid.
