= Stephen T. Johnson =

Major general in the United States Marine Corps and commanding general in the Iraq War

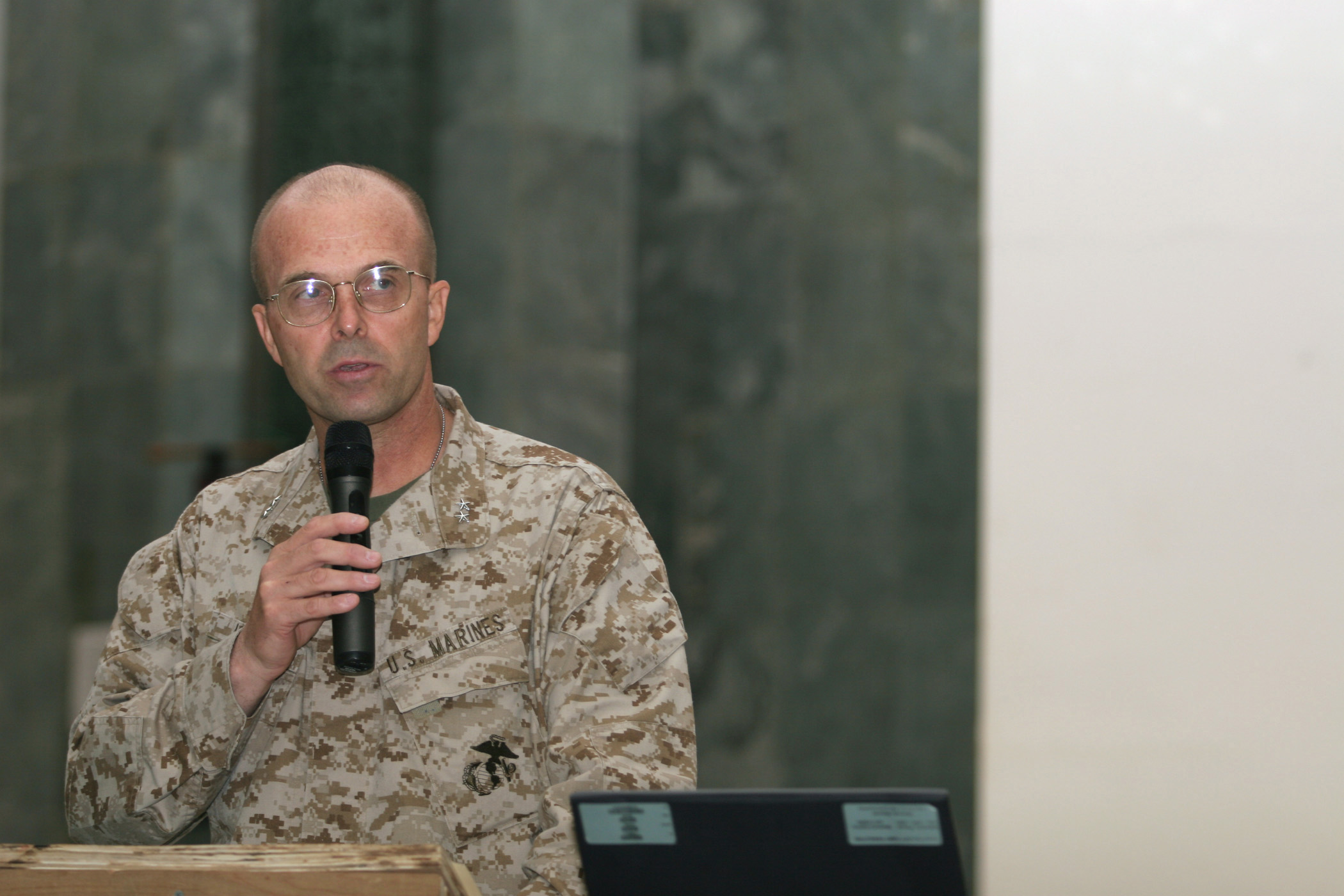
- Born: 1950 (age 75–76); Washington, D.C., U.S.
- Alma mater: Monmouth College (Illinois)
- Military career
- Allegiance: United States
- Branch: United States Marine Corps
- Service years: 1972–2007
- Rank: Major general
- Conflicts: Iraq War

Stephen T. Johnson (born 1950) is a retired major general in the United States Marine Corps who served as commanding general of the 2nd Marine Division during the Iraq War.

He is an alumnus of Monmouth College.
