= Operation Sayeed =

2005 Iraq War operation

- Part of Al Anbar campaign and Iraq War
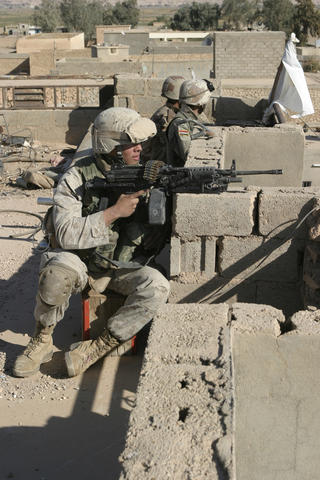
- U.S. Marine Lcpl. Raphael Hernandez, and Iraqi Army soldiers watch over the surrounding streets from a rooftop in Karabilah, Iraq, during Operation Steel Curtain on 11 November 2005.
| Date | July – 22 December 2005 |
| Location | Hit, Haditha, Husaybah, and al-Qa'im: Al Anbar Governorate, Iraq |
| Result | U.S. victory |

Belligerents
| United States: Multi-National Forces West; Iraq: New Iraqi Army; Iraqi Police | al-Qaeda in Iraq; Ba'ath Party Loyalists; Ansar al-Sunna; Other Insurgents Islamic Army in Iraq |

Commanders and leaders
| Unknown | Sulaiman Darwaish † (AQI leader in Qaim); Saeed Huwair (former army officer); Abdul-Samad Ghurairi (Baath leader); Muhannad Ulayyan (Islamic Army in Iraq commander); Farhan Khalifawi (Islamic Army in Iraq commander); Hatim Muslim (Ansar al-Sunnah commander); Mulla Hamidi Jughaifi (AQI leader in Haditha); Fulaih Mazid (Ansar al-Sunnah commander) |

Casualties and losses
| (United States) 54 killed, 324 wounded (Iraq) 16 killed, 89 wounded | U.S claim: 757 killed 64 wounded 2,308 detained |

Operation Sayeed (Arabic: عملية الصياد) also known as Operation Hunter in English, was a series of operations conducted in western Al Anbar Governorate by the United States Marine Corps in 2005. It was an umbrella operation, consisting of at least 11 named operations between July 2005 to December 2005. The purpose was to drive Al-Qaeda in Iraq forces from the Western Euphrates River Valley. Some parts of Operation Sayeed were Operation Steel Curtain and Operation Iron Fist.

There were three goals of Operation Sayeed, in addition to removing AQI from the Western Euphrates River Valley; they were to ensure there was a secure "climate" and "environment" to conduct a referendum in October and national elections in December 2005; and the third was to secure the control of the Iraqi border to the Iraqi people. Al-Anbar Governorate was divided into areas of operations: II Marine Expeditionary Force (codenamed Operation Atlanta) included Area of Operations Denver (western region), Area of Operations Topeka (Ramadi and surrounding area), Area of Operations Raleigh (Fallujah and surrounding area) and Area of Operations Oshkosh (al-Taqaddum).

== Events ==
=== Area of Operations Denver ===
==== Battle of Haditha and Operation Quick Strike ====
Between 1–4 August, the Battle of Haditha took place: On 1 August, A 6-man U.S. Marine sniper team were ambushed in Haditha by Ansar al-Sunna insurgents 5 of the team were killed and 1 was missing; In response a U.S. Marine task force from 3rd Battalion, 25th Marines cordoned off and searched Haditha, where they engaged in combat with Ansar al-Sunna and AQI terrorists.

Regimental Combat Team 2, with the assistance of 2nd Squadron 14th Cavalry Regiment had planned to carryout Operation Lightning Strike II in August-targeting the town of Anah and the town of Qādisiyyah to disrupt insurgent activities and show the Iraqi government the deployment of a competent security force. However the operation did not take place due to the clashes in Haditha and were reallocated to Operation Quick Strike (3–11 August). The force cordoned off and searched Haqlaniyah and Barwanah, 2nd LAR and 3rd Battalion, 25th Marines prepared to move into Haqlaniyah, whilst K and L Companies of 3rd Battalion, 2nd Marines and 2nd platoon A Company, 1st Tank Battalion moved into an assembly area west of the Euphrates after an Iraqi special operations company secured it; Iraqi troops from the 1st Division were part of the operation. L Company of 3rd Battalion, 2nd Marines and 2nd platoon A Company, 1st Tank Battalion prepared to clear Barwanah. Marines from 1st Force Reconnaissance Company provided raid and sniper support. On 4 August, Marine battalions attacked through the villages from the north, 3rd Battalion, 2nd Marines only encountered sporadic resistance and set a base to support continuing operations. Resistance in both Haditha, Haqlaniyah and Barawanah increased, the added combination of supporting airstrikes suppressed resistance. The body of the missing Marine was found in Haqlaniyah; the Operation resulted in 15 insurgents killed and a further 63 detained, Coalition forces lost 14 killed and 6 wounded, one Iraqi special forces operative was also killed.

==== Operation Cyclone ====
On 11 September, 2nd LAR and Iraqi forces established a cordon around Ar-Rutbah to begin Operation Cyclone. Marine Force Recon and Iraqi special forces swept through the town from the north whilst K company, 3rd Battalion, 6th Marines, supported by AAV's and a platoon from 2nd LAR, swept in from the south, targeting pre-selected houses. The operation was the last conducting by 2nd LAR in Iraq before rotating back to the United States in September.

==== Operations Mustang, Lightning Strike and Green Light ====
4th squadron, 14th Cavalry Regiment, cleared the village of al-Ash on 16 September (known as Operation Mustang); they repeated this in Operation Lightning Strike on 28–29 September, clearing Anah and Qadisiyah (the operation deferred by RCT-2 in August because of the substitution of Operation Quick Strike to clear Barwanah and to stop counterattacks against 3d Battalion, 25th Marines). 3rd Battalion 504th Infantry Regiment cleared a military housing compound in Baghdadi in Operation Green Light.

==== Operation Iron Fist ====
Between 1–7 October, 3rd Battalion, 6th Marines carried out its first major operation since relieving 3rd Battalion, 2nd Marines in Al-Qaim-Operation Iron Fist, in the village of Sadah and the eastern half of Karabillah; its aim was to eliminate insurgents, clear routes and establish battle positions. The Marines were supported by a platoon each of tanks, combat engineers and amphibious assault vehicles; the operation also provided a deception to distract insurgents while units prepared for Operation River Gate. On 1 October, the task force cleared Sadah from east to west with three rifle companies, fighting sporadically with insurgents who fought from prepared positions with small arms, rocket launchers, mortars and explosive devices. The task force killed an estimated 12 insurgents and encamped on a wadi between Sadah and Karabillah, a troop of the 4th squadron 14th Cavalry Regiment screened the left bank of the Euphrates river whilst mobile assault platoons of the Marine battalion's weapons company blocked the roads between the two towns.

2 October saw stiffer opposition from the insurgents fighting in Karabillah, the Marines advanced through the town over the following 3 days, using all their direct fire weapons and mortars, Marine aircraft delivered rockets, hellfire missiles, GBU-12s and other bombs. The insurgent death toll increased to 51, whilst the task force lost 1 Marine killed and 9 wounded; the operation ended on 7 October, with two battle positions established for two rifle platoons, patrolling and small arms engagements continued for several weeks, but a foothold for further operations in the west had been established-which would be Operation Steel Curtain.

==== Operation River Gate ====
Between 3–19 October (some sources say 20) 3rd Battalion, 1st Marines, 1st LAR and 3rd Battalion 504th Infantry Regiment, along with Iraqi security forces carried out Operation River Gate to continue the disruption of insurgents in Hadithah, Haqlaniyah and Barwanah and secure the towns. The Coalition forces encountered numerous small arms fire attacks and 13 IED attacks; Marine Aircraft Group 26 carried out heliborne assaults with elements of the 82nd Airborne Division, 1st Reconnaissance Battalion, 1st brigade of the Iraqi 1st Division and the 2nd Marine Division with the units surrounding Haditha. In addition, helicopters assigned to Army paratroopers and Regimental Combat Team 2 also conducted a combined air assault raid by 2nd Reconnaissance Battalion and an Iraqi special operations company in the vicinity of Abu Hyat against a known HVT, the force took several detainees, Coalition forces killed 12 insurgents, detained over 172 more, and found 32 weapons caches and 95 IED devices and mines. Consequently, they established a permanent base to provide continued security. 3rd platoon, C Company, 1st Combat Engineer Battalion established bases in each town.

==== Operation Steel Curtain ====
Operation Steel Curtain was focused on disrupting and denying AQI safe havens and freedom of movement in western Al-Anbar Governorate, establishing a persistent presence in this region, restoring Iraqi control of the border with Syria, and setting the conditions for the constitutional referendum and national election. Operation Steel Curtain began on 3 November and lasted until 22 November; entailing considerable fighting Syria-Iraq border, which resulted in the elimination of a significant foreign fighter force. A combined US Marine, Army and Iraqi Army Task Force swept west to east through Husaybah and continued east through Karabillah, clearing both towns of local insurgents and foreign jihadist and established a permanent presence in the town. Nearly two weeks into the Operation, US Marines cleared the town of Ubaydi, throughout the fight, the marines had to call in continuous air support, in total 67 airstrikes were called in by controllers and over 100 precision-guided bombs munitions were employed, aviation played a crucial role in combat resupply of tank ammunition and water as well as multiple casualty evacuations. The Marine assault forces suffered 10 killed and 59 wounded, whilst the insurgents lost 139 killed and 388-400 captured. In the aftermath of the operation, the Iraqi 1st Brigade was able to establish its headquarters in Al-Qaim. On 19 November Haditha killings took place.

==== Operation Iron Hammer ====
Between 30 November – 4 December, 2nd Battalion, 1st Marines carried out Operation Iron Hammer-a clearing action across the Euphrates from Hit, while 2nd Battalion, 114th Field Artillery Regiment and the Iraqi 1st battalion, 2nd Brigade, 7th Division secured Hit itself. The Marine battalion, a company of Iraqi troops and 30 Desert protector scouts (also known as Army scouts) crossed to clear Hai al-Becker district and to establish a base for the Iraqi battalion to occupy, thereby securing the eastern side of the city. With this improved security, the Hit bridge was reopened to foot traffic, the operation also detained 19 suspected insurgents and removed 9 IEDs.

=== Operation Liberty Express ===
Operation Liberty Express was conducted from 1 September through to 30 December by US and Iraqi forces to protect the polling stations on 15 October's referendum and on 15 December national election. The operation focused on expanding Coalition forces and the Ministry of Defense and Ministry of Interior control throughout Al-Anbar Governorate, while providing support to the Independent Electoral Commission in Iraq for the constitutional referendum and elections.

Operation Liberty Express was an extension of Operation Guardian Sword (6 June – 15 August)-the operations objectives called for neutralizing the insurgencies in Ramadi while covering the rotation of combat units and personnel in other units to support the upcoming referendum and election, the operation included a number of subsidiary operations, Operation Guardian Sword ended with the relief of a US Army Brigade assigned to the 2nd Marine Division. Operation Lightning Express composed of four subsidiary phase operations: one of which was Operation Guardian Shield which was aimed at covering force rotations over a two-month period.

The units of the 2nd Marine Division conducted over 30 operations to create the secure environment of the referendum and elections to take place, with counter insurgency operations being conducted in nearly every city across Al-Anbar Governorate, capitalizing on progress made in other operations. In addition to killing almost 1,000 insurgents and detaining almost 4,000 more, over 500 weapons caches were discovered (the significant weapons cache included more than 10,000 artillery, mortar and rocket rounds, 70 250-pound bombs and 5 surface-to-air missile systems. The operation successfully culminated on 15 December with the elections and ended on 22 December-thus ending Operation Sayeed.

=== Operation Sayeed (Hunter) II ===
Phase II of Operation Sayeed began in September, it was known as Multi-National Force – Iraq called Operation Sayeed (Hunter) II would establish indigenous forces in Al Anbar Governorate, secure the region along the Syrian border and interdict insurgent activity all along the Euphrates River Valley. Many local operations would exploit sweeps by establishing permanent presences in an increasing number of towns and civil affairs programmes would concentrate on encouraging anti-insurgent sentiment among Sunni leaders and the populace. Forces were still inadequate to either control the Syrian border or control the large area along the river valley, part of the effort to restrict insurgent traffic was to destroy selected bridges across the Euphrates with airstrike and Army M270 Multiple Launch Rocket System, and to establish random checkpoints along major roads on the south bank. In September, a full Iraqi Army brigade joined the operation and made a significant contribution to the operation in the Western Euphrates River Valley at that time. The 2nd Marine Aircraft Wing, executed special planning and coordination for operation, whilst in support of the operation the II Marine Expeditionary Force delivered critically needed humanitarian assistance which was used to support Internally Displaced Persons camps and other humanitarian needs. In October, the operation showed its first results when 1st Brigade, of the Iraqi 1st Division established a headquarters in Al-Qaim, signalling the beginning of the border force to in Al-Anbar, also October, the operation showed further results with the deployment of reliable Iraqi units (three battalions 3rd Brigade, 7th Division were arriving in strength to secure the border towns beginning with Hit, Hadithah and Rawah. Operation Iron Fist and Operation River Gate covered their deployment into the Governorate.

=== Area of Operations Raleigh ===
==== Operation Constitution Hammer ====
In October, F Company, 2nd Battalion, 6th Marines, and 1st Battalion, 2nd Brigade of the Iraqi Army to carryout Operation Constitution Hammer: Its aim was to disrupt insurgent activity along the main supply routes in Fallujah, as well as find weapons caches and kill or capture insurgents. F Company established a cordon security whilst its 2nd Platoon along with the Iraqi troops searched the buildings that were encircled. The Marines searched every building within their area of responsibility, after the buildings were inspected and cleared, control was turned over to the Iraqi army, the mission was a success, Iraqi troops unearthed a large cache of weapons and denied the insurgents the ability to operate in the area.

==== Operation Trifecta ====
Between 10 and 20 November 144 U.S. Marines of E, F and Weapons Companies of 2nd Battalion, 2nd Marines, inserted by helicopter into 3 landing zones, with direct support two squads of Combat Engineers from 2nd Battalion, 7th Marine Regiment, carried out Operation Trifecta in Zaidon, whilst D Company, 2nd Tank Battalion, elements of 1st Reconnaissance Battalion (who carried out Operation Southern Hunter), elements of 2nd Assault Amphibian Battalion and Team Traveller (part of Regimental Combat Team 8's headquarters company and U.S. Army B Troop, 1st Squadron, 75th Cavalry Regiment) acted as blocking forces for the raids on 14 November. The rapid setup of the cordon prevented insurgents escaping the area. US forces carried out house-to-house searches (particularly in the Sadan market) and wide spread cache sweeps; the operation also integrated communications jamming by EA-6B Prowler . According to Maj Timothy M. Bairstow The Marines detained more than 30 suspected insurgents and located more than 1,000 artillery rounds, mortar and rockets; 20,000 rounds of ammunition for small arms and over a dozen weapon systems, including AK-47's and Rocket Propelled Grenade launchers.

Operations in AO Raleigh continued actions in and around Fallujah and searched for weapon caches, such as Operation Southern Fire (24–29 August).

=== Area of Operations Topeka ===
==== Operation Guardian Sword ====
Operation Guardian Sword (6 June – 15 August)- was an operation whose objectives called for neutralizing the insurgencies in Ramadi while covering the rotation of combat units and personnel in other units to support the upcoming referendum and election, the operation included a number of subsidiary operations, Operation Guardian Sword ended with the relief of the two US Army Brigade assigned to the 2nd Marine Division.

==== Operation Mountaineers, Tigers, Shank ====
CNN reported that on 4 October 500 U.S. troops and 400 Iraqi security forces began Operation Mountaineers: The force carried out "cordon and search operation" in Ramadi's southern district of Tammin, the operation was aimed to "disrupt insurgents in southern Ramadi who are transporting weapons and munitions into the city." After 4 Marine CH-47E helicopters instrted A Troop, 1st Squadron, 167th Cavalry Regiment into blocking positions southeast of the city, C Company, 1st Battalion, 172nd Armor Regiment established a cordon to isolate the southeast corner of the city. From the North, two Army infantry companies, accompanied by 1st and 3rd battalion, 1st brigade, Iraqi 7th Division cleared and secured their target districts on the southern side of the canal, while 3rd Battalion, 7th Marines cleared the north side of the canal, accompanied by 2nd battalion, 1st brigade, Iraqi 7th Division and supported by a tank platoon from D Company, 2nd Battalion, 69th Armor Regiment. US Marines and soldiers and Iraqi troops searched all houses and vehicles in a major demonstration of combined US-Iraqi forces. After being attacked by small arms, explosives dives and rocket fire 3rd Battalion, 7th Marines called in fixed and rotary wing air support, which remained overhead until all objectives were cleared and the Marines returned to base.

The 2nd Brigade, 28th Infantry Division carried out Operation Tigers (25–26 November)-a clearing operation in the Mulaab district of eastern Ramadi, with both fixed and rotary-wing aircraft in support. 3rd Battalion, 7th Marines and 2nd battalion, 1st Brigade, 7th Iraqi Division carried out Operation Shank (2–3 December)- a cordon and search mission in the same area and the adjacent al-Dubaht district to find weapons cashes and to disrupt insurgent activities.

== Aftermath ==
Operation Liberty Express ended on 22 December-thus Operation Sayeed. Operation Sayeed resulted in a number of accomplishments and successes, many AQI terrorists and insurgents were killed which weekend the insurgency and their activities were disrupted; places where the insurgents felt secure were eliminated; AQI's leadership was disrupted and were not able to operate freely in that part of the country. It was the first time US forces had carried operated on a large scale with Iraqi forces. The operation's significant disruption to AQI's organisation had a lasting effect across Al-Anbar Governorate, in addition to destroying much of the AQI leadership and command-and-control functions, this operation significantly improved opinions among the local population of western Al-Anbar, as the operation stopped AQI's murder and intimidation campaign that was successful in preventing locals from assisting Coalition forces; a permanent Iraqi Security force presence was established across most of the western Euphrates River valley, consequently eliminating AQI influence and restoring a sense of security among the local populace, who were then more willing cooperate and assist Coalition and Iraqi Army forces. The success of the operation also ensured the safety and maximum participation of Iraqi citizens in the constitutional referendum and national elections, the security of the polling stations on 15 October and 15 December was carried out by Iraqi Security Forces-demonstrating significant progress in the Security force.

Throughout the Operation, the 2nd Marine Aircraft Wing flew approximately 11,172 sorties and 22,012 flight hours in support of the operation.
