= Battle of Husaybah =

Battle of Husaybah may refer to one of the following:

== Iraq War ==
- Battle of Husaybah (2004) – sometimes referred to as the "First Battle of Husaybah"
- Operation Steel Curtain – sometimes referred to as the "Second Battle of Husaybah"
