= 3rd Battalion, 6th Marines =

3rd Battalion 6th Marines
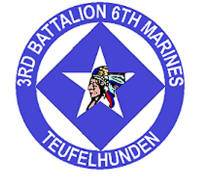
- 3/6 Insignia
- Active: August 14, 1917 – August 20, 1919; June 14, 1922 – August 10, 1922; June 12, 1924 – November 10, 1928; November 1, 1940 – March 27, 1946; October 17, 1949 – present
- Country: United States
- Branch: United States Marine Corps
- Type: Light Infantry
- Role: The mission of the Marine Corps rifle squad is to locate, close with and destroy the enemy by fire and maneuver and/ or repel enemy assault by fire and close combat.
- Part of: 6th Marine Regiment; 2nd Marine Division
- Garrison/HQ: Marine Corps Base Camp Lejeune
- Nickname: "Teufel Hunden" (Devil Dogs)
- Motto: “Discipline”
- Engagements: World War I; Battle of Belleau Wood; Battle of Soissons; Battle of Saint-Mihiel; Meuse-Argonne offensive; World War II; Pacific War; Battle of Guadalcanal; Battle of Tarawa; Battle of Saipan; Battle of Tinian; Battle of Okinawa; Operation Just Cause; Operation Desert Storm; War on terror; Operation Enduring Freedom; Operation Iraqi Freedom; Operation Inherent Resolve; Operation Southern Spear

Commanders
- Current commander: LtCol Mark P. Paige

3rd Battalion, 6th Marines (3/6) is an infantry battalion in the United States Marine Corps based out of Camp Lejeune, North Carolina. Also known as "Teufelhunden" (Devil Dogs), the battalion consists of approximately 1000 Marines and Sailors. 3/6 falls under the command of the 6th Marine Regiment and the 2nd Marine Division.

== Subordinate units ==
- H&S Company
- India Company
- Kilo Company
- Lima Company
- Weapons Company

== History ==
=== World War I ===
3rd Battalion 6th Marines was activated on August 14, 1917, at Quantico, Virginia, as the 3rd Battalion, 6th Regiment. They were quickly deployed during October–November 1917 to France and assigned to the 4th Brigade, American Expeditionary Force. They participated in the following World War I offensive campaigns: Aisne-Marne, Saint-Mihiel and the Meuse-Argonne. They also participated in the following World War I defensive campaigns: Toulon-Troyon, Chateau-Thiery, Marabache, and Limey. Following the war they took part in the occupation of the Rhineland, December 1918-July 1919. They returned during July–August 1919 to Quantico, Virginia. The battalion was deactivated August 20, 1919

3/6 was reactivated June 14, 1922, at Quantico, Virginia, as the 3rd Battalion, 6th Regiment and assigned to the 4th Brigade. They participated in maneuvers at Gettysburg, Pennsylvania, June–July 1922 and attached to the Marine Corps Expeditionary Force. They were shortly thereafter deactivated August 10, 1922, at Quantico, Virginia

Again reactivated June 12, 1924, at Santo Domingo, Dominican Republic they were relocated during July 1924 to Guantanamo Bay, Cuba. They moved during January 1925 to Quantico, Virginia and were again deactivated February 1, 1925. Reactivated April 1927 at Norfolk, Virginia, as the 3rd Battalion, 6th Regiment and assigned to the provisional regiment. They deployed during April–July 1927 to Tientsin, China and reassigned to the 3rd Marine Brigade. The Battalion was redesignated October 4, 1927, as the 1st Battalion, 12 Regiment and redesignated again on April 22, 1928, as the 3rd Battalion, 6th Regiment. In October 1928 they moved to San Diego, California and were deactivated November 10, 1928.

=== World War II ===
3/6 was again reactivated on November 1, 1940, in San Diego, California, as the 3rd Battalion, 6th Marines and assigned to the 2nd Marine Brigade. In the spring of 1941 they deployed to Reykjavík, Iceland and were reassigned to the 1st Provisional Marine Brigade. They returned January–February 1942 to San Diego, California and reassigned to the 2nd Marine Division.

Deployed during October–November 1942 to Wellington, New Zealand they participated in the following World War II campaigns: Guadalcanal, Southern Solomons, Tarawa, Saipan, Tinian and Okinawa. Following the war they were relocated during September 1945 to Nagasaki, Japan. They participated in the Occupation of Japan, September 1945 to February 1946 and arrived back in Camp Pendleton, California during February–March 1946. They were again deactivated March 27, 1946.

=== Post-World War II ===
3/6 was again brought back on October 17, 1949, on board USS Fremont and assigned to the 2nd Marine Division. The battalion relocated during August 1950 to Camp Pendleton, California and once again were deactivated September 11, 1950. 3/6 was quickly reactivated September 12, 1950, at Camp Lejeune, North Carolina and assigned to the 2nd Marine Division. They deployed at various times as Battalion Landing Team 3/6 in the Mediterranean and Caribbean from April 1952 to 1958

=== 1958-2000 ===
- Participated in the Landings in Lebanon, July–October 1958
- Participated in the Cuban Missile Crisis, October–December 1962
- Participated in Operation Power Pack, Dominican Republic, April–May 1965
- Participated in reinforcement of naval base, Guantanamo Bay, Cuba, October–November 1979
- 1982 3/6 Became the First Reorganized Rifle Bn. (SOC) Special Operations Capable in The Marine Corps.
- Kilo company participated in Operation Just Cause, Panama, December 1989-January 1990
- Participated in Operation Desert Shield and Operation Desert Storm, Southwest Asia, December 1990-April 1991
- Participated in Operation Restore Hope, Mogadishu, Somalia, January–March 1994
- Participated preparations for Operation Uphold Democracy, Haiti, July–August 1994
- Participated in Operation Sea Signal, Guantanamo Bay, Cuba, January–March 1995
- Participated in Operation Southern Watch / Operation Desert Thunder, Southwest Asia, February–March 1998

=== Global war on terror ===
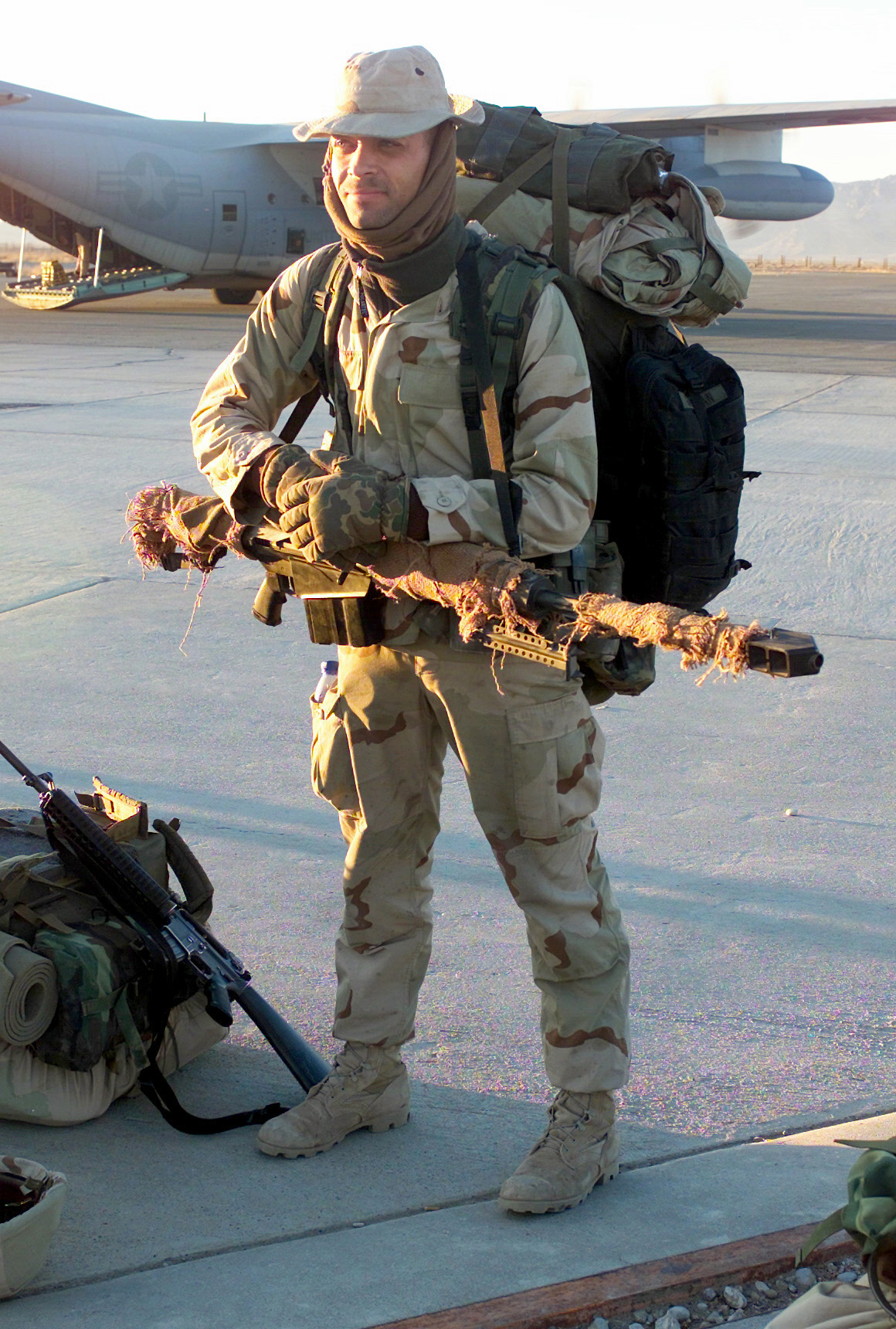
A Navy Corpsman of Headquarters Company, Battalion Landing Team 3/6 holds a Barrett M82A1 at Kandahar Airfield, January 2002

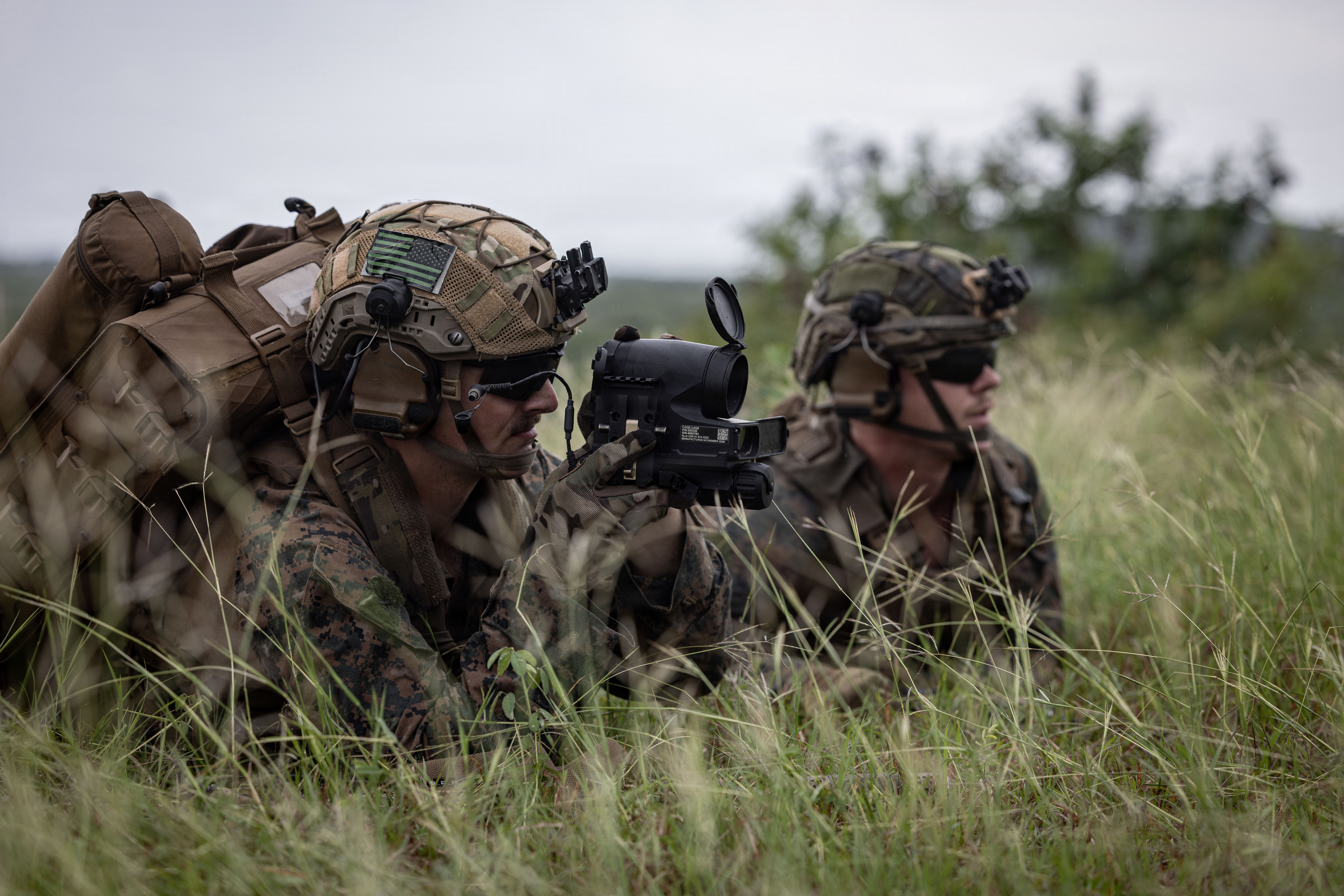
Marine rifleman with India Company, Battalion Landing Team 3/6, 22nd Marine Expeditionary Unit during training at Campamento Santiago, October 2025

The battalion participated in Operation Enduring Freedom in Afghanistan & Pakistan from November 2001 until February 2002. During this time they assisted in the capture and defense of Kandahar Airfield and as well as the defense of the American Embassy in Kabul in December 2001.

From the summer of 2002 to March 2004, the battalion functioned as the Marine Corps Anti-Terrorism Battalion known as the 4th MEB deploying forces in support of Combined Joint Task Force-180 to the U.S. Embassy in Kabul, Afghanistan, Joint Task Force-GTMO in Guantanamo Bay, Cuba and in support of Combined Joint Task Force-Horn of Africa in Djibouti.

In March 2004 the battalion resumed their function as an infantry battalion and deployed to eastern Afghanistan from April 2004 to December 2004 in support of Operation Enduring Freedom.

==== Operation Iraqi Freedom ====
In August 2005, 3/6 made their first deployment to Iraq in support of Operation Iraqi Freedom. They returned from Iraq in late March 2006 having served in the Al-Anbar province in the Al-Qaim region, an insurgent staging area for travel south to disrupt regional stability. In October 2005, the battalion performed Operation Ironfist and successfully swept and cleared the cities of Sadah and Eastern Karabilah taking minimal casualties. They also operated as the main effort under RCT-2 alongside 2nd Battalion 1st Marines during Operation Steel Curtain during which they raided, swept, and cleared the cities of Husaybah and Karabilah.

Marines from the battalion also took part in Operation Northern Forge and Operation Murfreesboro.

In January 2007, 3/6 deployed to the Al Anbar province at Camp Habbaniyah; operating from western Ramadi to eastern/southern Fallujah. They returned from a 7-month deployment on August 12, 2007,

In April 2008, 3/6 deployed to the Al Anbar province at Camp Baharia; near Fallujah, under Regimental Combat Team 1. They returned from a 7-month deployment on October 27, 2008.

==== Operation Enduring Freedom ====
In January 2010, 3/6 deployed to Afghanistan in support of Operation Enduring Freedom. During this time the battalion participated in Operation Moshtarak, securing and operating in the north of Marjah. They returned from this deployment in August 2010. In June 2011, 3/6 re-deployed again to Marjah and its surrounding areas.

In December 2014, 3/6 deployed to the Mediterranean in support of the 24th MEU. They returned from this deployment in June 2015.

==== Operation Inherent Resolve ====
In February 2017, 3/6 deployed again on the 24th MEU. A platoon from each company deployed to Syria in support of Operation Inherent Resolve in order to clear IS militants from Ar Raqqah, Syria.

== Battalion Indian head patch ==
During World War I the Fifth and Sixth Marines fought in France as the Fourth Marine Brigade of the US Army's 2nd Infantry Division were forced to wear the Army's uniform. The Marines had only the eagle, globe, and anchor on their soft covers to distinguish themselves from their Army brothers-in-arms. As this did not sit well with the Marines, a patch was designed to distinguish them from their counterparts. A black shield with one five-pointed star and an Indian head with full war bonnet was selected. It is said that the black was for mourning and respect for their casualties, the shield for defense, and the star for the Second Division Commander, Brigadier General John A. Lejeune, and the Indian for General Lejeune's nickname "Old Indian." Another source says the patch was derived from a U.S. Coin in circulation at the time.

General Lejeune himself gave a somewhat different history as to the origin of the patch in his 1930 autobiography "The Reminiscences of a Marine." He states; "There was no inferiority complex about the Second Division. We knew that we were second to none, but also that we were better than any! So we adopted the star and Indian head as Division Insignia, the Indian head representing its fighting ability, and the star its spirit or espirit de corps. It was, I think, the First Division of the A.E.F. (American Expeditionary Force) to wear insignia."

"We carried the idea out, too, to its logical conclusion by providing a different background for each regiment, each Battalion, and each separate detachment."

The Sixth Marine Regiment used the same design in a diamond shape instead of a shield. The color of the background on which the star was placed shows the battalion: black, headquarters; green, supply; purple, machine-gun company; red, First Battalion; yellow, Second Battalion; and blue, third battalion.

== Notable former members ==
- Julian D. Alford
- Daniel Daly
- Joseph F. Dunford, Jr.
- Jared Golden

== Honors & awards ==
The unit has received the following awards:

- Presidential Unit Citation Streamer
  - Tarawa 1943
  - Operation Moshtarak, Marjah 2010
- Navy Unit Commendation Streamer with four bronze stars
  - Dominican Republic 1965
  - Panama 1989-1990
  - Southwest Asia 1990-1991
  - Afghanistan 2001-2002
  - Husaybah/Fallujah 2007
- Meritorious Unit Commendation Streamer with two bronze star
  - Guantanamo Bay 1979, 1985–1987
  - LF5F Med. Deployment 1999-2000
- World War I victory streamer with one silver star
- Army of Occupation of Germany streamer
- Marine Corps Expeditionary streamer with two bronze stars
- Yangtze Service streamer
- American Defense Service streamer with one bronze star
- European-African-Middle Eastern Campaign streamer
- Asiatic-Pacific campaign streamer with one silver and one bronze star
- World War II Victory streamer
- Navy Occupation Service streamer with "Asia" and "Europe"
- National Defense Service streamer with two bronze stars
- Southwest Asia Service streamer with two bronze stars
- Armed Forces Expeditionary streamer with two bronze stars
- Afghanistan Campaign Medal with two bronze stars
- Iraq Campaign Medal with four bronze stars
- Global War on Terrorism Expeditionary Medal
- Global War on Terrorism Service Medal
- French Croix de Guerre with two palms and one gilt star
- French Fourragère

== See also ==
- Organization of the United States Marine Corps
- List of United States Marine Corps battalions
