= Operation Steel Curtain =

2005 military operation in Iraq

- Part of the Iraq War
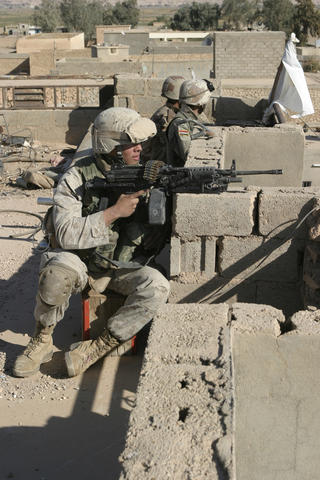
- A U.S. Marine and Iraqi Army soldiers watch over the surrounding streets from a rooftop in Karabilah, Iraq, during Operation Steel Curtain on 11 November 2005.
Date	5–22 November 2005
Location	Husaybah, Karabilah, Ubaydi, Iraq
Result	U.S. victory

Belligerents
United States (Iraq) New Iraqi Army	Al-Qaeda in Iraq; Other insurgents

Commanders and leaders
(United States) Col. J.D. Alford (3/6) (United States) Col. S.W. Davis (RCT-2)	Abu Musab al-Zarqawi

Casualties and losses
(United States) 10 killed, 30 injured (Iraq) Unknown	139 killed 256 captured
- 97+ civilians killed

Operation Steel Curtain (Arabic: الحجاب الفولاذي Al Hejab Elfulathi) was a military operation executed by coalition forces in early November 2005 to reduce the flow of foreign insurgents crossing the border and joining the Iraqi insurgency. The operation was important in that it was the first large scale deployment of the New Iraqi Army. This offensive was part of the larger Operation Sayeed (Hunter), designed to prevent al Qaeda in Iraq from operating in the Euphrates River Valley and throughout Al Anbar and to establish a permanent Iraqi Army presence in the Al Qa’im region.

== Operation ==
On 5 November, Marines from 3rd Battalion, 6th Marines, 2nd Battalion, 1st Marines, 3rd Battalion, 7th Marines, and a TAP element from HQ 10th Marines, began their assault on insurgent-held Husaybah, and had cleared the city four days later. Then on 10 November the coalition forces began to attack the city of Karabilah and pursue any insurgents who fled Husaybah. After four more days of fighting in Karabilah, the coalition troops launched another phase of the operation into the city of Ubaydi, an insurgent haven and site of the earlier Operation Matador. The fortified city fell to coalition forces after seven days of fighting, bringing a conclusion to Operation Steel Curtain. The assault on Sadah and a small portion of Karabilah was known as "Operation: Iron Fist". The assault of Husaybah and Karabilah was "Operation: Steel Curtain". So named because the resident leader of anti-coalition forces, al-Zarqawi, said they would hold on to Husaybah with an "iron fist". Named by Coalition Commanders, "Operation Steel Curtain", was a hardened sweep and clear mission hence "steel curtain" because one of the SNCOs was a Pittsburgh Steelers fan.

== Aftermath ==
U.S. officials reported that the operation killed 139 insurgents and took 256 more prisoners, and considered it successful. Battle positions were constructed, preventing the insurgency from regaining control of the city. At least 10 U.S. Marines and an unknown number of Iraqi soldiers died. A local physician from Husaybah, Zahid Mohammed Rawi, said that medical workers had counted 97 civilians killed in the first week of the operation.
