= 3/6 =

3/6 may refer to:

- March 6 (month-day date notation)
- 3 June (day-month date notation)
- 3rd Battalion, 6th Marines
