= Ayad al-Jumaili =

ISIL member

Ayad Hamid Khalaf Al-Jumli (also known as Abu Yahya; Arabic: أياد الجميلي) is a senior leader in the Islamic State (IS) and an intelligence official under the government of former President of Iraq Saddam Hussein.

== History ==
Jumaili is a former intelligence officer from Fallujah under the government of former President of Iraq Saddam Hussein. After the U.S.-led invasion, he joined the Sunni insurgency and answered directly to Abu Bakr al-Baghdadi. He is the head of Amniyat (the Arabic word for 'security') in Iraq and Syria, IS's intelligence and public security department. An Iraqi intelligence spokesman announced on 1 April 2017 that he was killed along with two other IS commanders in an airstrike by the Iraqi Air Force in the region of al-Qaim. The statement described him as the second-in-command of IS and as a war minister. The US-led anti-IS coalition meanwhile said it was unable to confirm the information about his death.
