= Rumana subdistrict =

Rumana الرمانة
- Subdistrict
- Etymology: Means "pomegranate" in Arabic
- Interactive map of Rumana
- Location in Iraq
- Coordinates: 34°26′47.6″N 41°04′40.4″E
- Country: Iraq
- Governorate: Al Anbar Governorate
- District: Al-Qa'im District
- Seat: Rumana

Government
  - Type: Elected subdistrict council

Population
  - Total: 8,900
- All residents are Sunni Muslim Arabs
- Time zone: UTC+3 (AST)
- A concrete bridge connects Rumana with Qaim and Al Ubaidi across the Euphrates. The subdistrict was captured by ISIL on 16 June 2014 and recaptured by the Iraqi Army on 13 November 2017.

The Rumana Subdistrict (Arabic: ناحية الرمانة) is a sub-district of Al-Qa'im District on the north side of the Euphrates in west Al Anbar Governorate, on the Iraq-Syria border. Its capital is the town of Rumana. The name means 'pomegranate' in Arabic. Rumana is run by an elected sub-district council and sub-mayor.

It has a population of 8,900 inhabitants. All of them are Sunni Muslim Arabs, with the main tribes being Al-Bu Mahhal and Al-Marasimah, in addition to some minor tribes. People earn a living by work in farming, fishing, small business, and employment. There is a concrete bridge linking Rumana with Qaim and Al Ubaidi across the Euphrates.

Rumana sub-district fell under ISIL control on 16 June 2014.

Rumana sub-district was recaptured by the Iraqi Army on 13 November 2017.
