= Julian Alford =

U.S. Marine Corps general

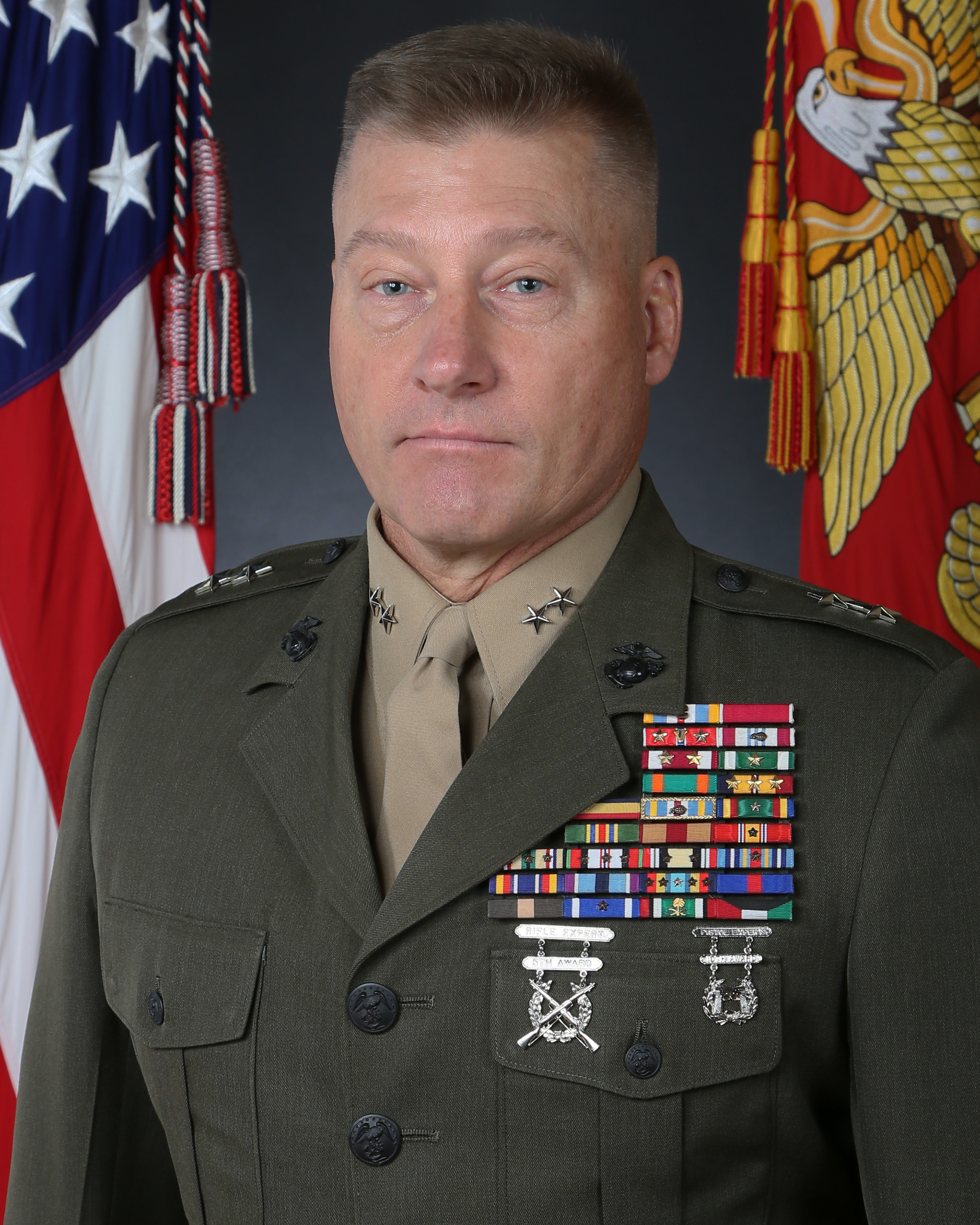
- Official portrait, 2019
- Born: 1963 (age 62–63)
- Military career
- Allegiance: United States
- Branch: United States Marine Corps
- Service years: 1985–2022
- Rank: Major General
- Commands: Marine Corps Training Command; Marine Corps Installations East; Marine Corps Base Camp Lejeune; Marine Corps Warfighting Laboratory The Basic School 3rd Battalion 6th Marines
- Conflicts: War in Iraq; War in Afghanistan

Julian D. Alford (born 1963) is a retired United States Marine Corps major general who last served as the Commanding General of the Marine Corps Training Command from 2021 to 2022. Previously, he served as the Commanding General of the Marine Corps Installations East and Marine Corps Base Camp Lejeune from August 7, 2017, to June 4, 2021.

Military offices
Preceded by Kevin J. Killea	Director of the Marine Corps Warfighting Laboratory; 2015–2017	Succeeded by Christian F. Wortman
Preceded by Michael L. Scalise	Commanding General of the Marine Corps Installations East and Marine Corps Base Camp Lejeune; 2017–2021	Succeeded by Andrew M. Niebel
Preceded by Jason L. Morris	Commanding General of the Marine Corps Training Command; 2021–2022	Succeeded by Farrell J. Sullivan
