= Ar Rahaliyah =

Ar Rahaliyah الرحالية
- Location within Iraq
- Coordinates: 32°45′0″N 43°24′36″E
- Country: Iraq
- Province: Al-Anbar

Ar Rahaliyah (Arabic: الرحالية, or Rahhaliyah, Rahaliya) is an Iraqi town in Al-Anbar Governorate, near the western shore of Lake Milh.

In 1921 Rahaliya, along with Shithathah, was noted for its "immense" groves for palm date production.

== Archaeology ==
The Rahaliyah area is recognised for the remains of early Christian churches, some of which may have been erected as martyrions.

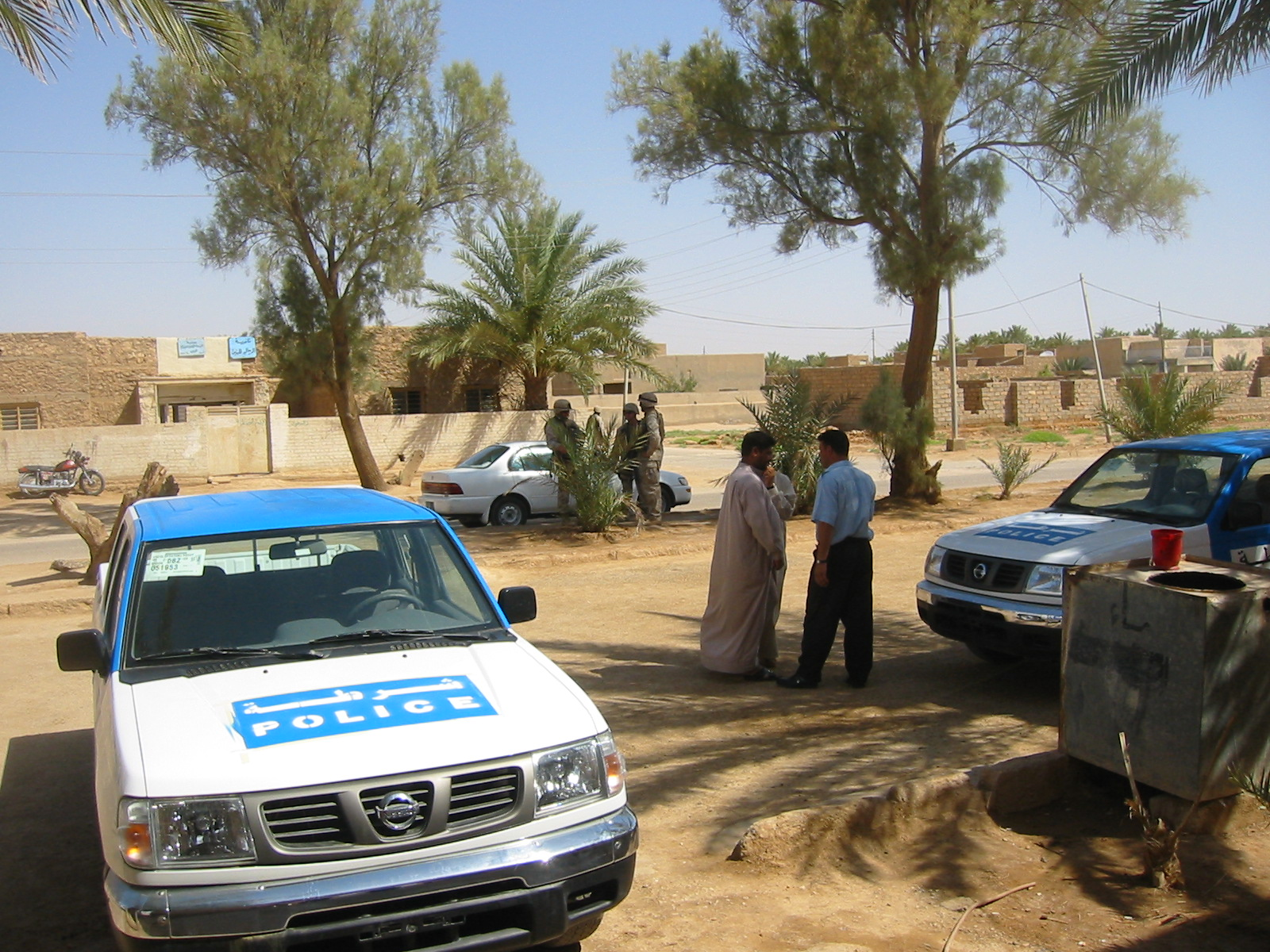
View from the town police station
