= 2nd Battalion, 1st Marines =

- 2nd Battalion, 1st Marines insignia (as of 2010)
- Active: August 1, 1922 – July 20, 1924; March 1, 1941 – October 31, 1947; August 4, 1950 – January 24, 1989; September 9, 1994–present
- Country: United States
- Branch: United States Marine Corps
- Type: Light infantry
- Role: Locate, close with and destroy the enemy by fire and maneuver
- Size: 1,200 men
- Part of: 1st Marine Regiment; 1st Marine Division
- Garrison/HQ: Marine Corps Base Camp Pendleton
- Nicknames: Gunsmoke, The Professionals, Ghost Battalion
- Motto: The Professionals
- Engagements: World War II; Guadalcanal Campaign; Battle of Cape Gloucester; Battle of Peleliu; Battle of Okinawa; Korean War; Battle of Inchon; Second Battle of Seoul; Battle of Chosin Reservoir; Battle of Hwacheon; Battle of the Punchbowl; Battle of Bunker Hill (1952); First Battle of the Hook; Battle for Outpost Vegas; Battle of the Samichon River; Vietnam War; War on terror; Operation Enduring Freedom; Operation Iraqi Freedom; Operation Vigilant Resolve

Commanders
- Current commander: LtCol Zach Ota
- Notable commanders: James M. Masters, Sr. Edwin A. Pollock; William W. Stickney; Charles F. Widdecke; Archie Van Winkle; William G. Leftwich, Jr. Peter Pace

2nd Battalion, 1st Marines (2/1) is an infantry battalion in the United States Marine Corps based in Camp HORNO on Marine Corps Base Camp Pendleton, California. Nicknamed "The Professionals," the battalion consists of approximately 1,200 Marines and Sailors. Normally they fall under the command of the 1st Marine Regiment and the 1st Marine Division.

== Subordinate units ==
- Headquarters and Services Company
- Echo Company
- Fox Company
- Golf Company
- Hotel Company
- Weapons Company (CAAT RED, CAAT BLUE, 81s [Mortars] Platoon, Scout Sniper Platoon)

== History ==
The battalion was activated August 1, 1922, at Santo Domingo, Dominican Republic, as the 2nd Battalion, 1st Regiment and was assigned to the 2nd Brigade. The battalion played a role in the occupation of the Dominican Republic, after which it was deactivated on July 20, 1924.

=== World War II ===
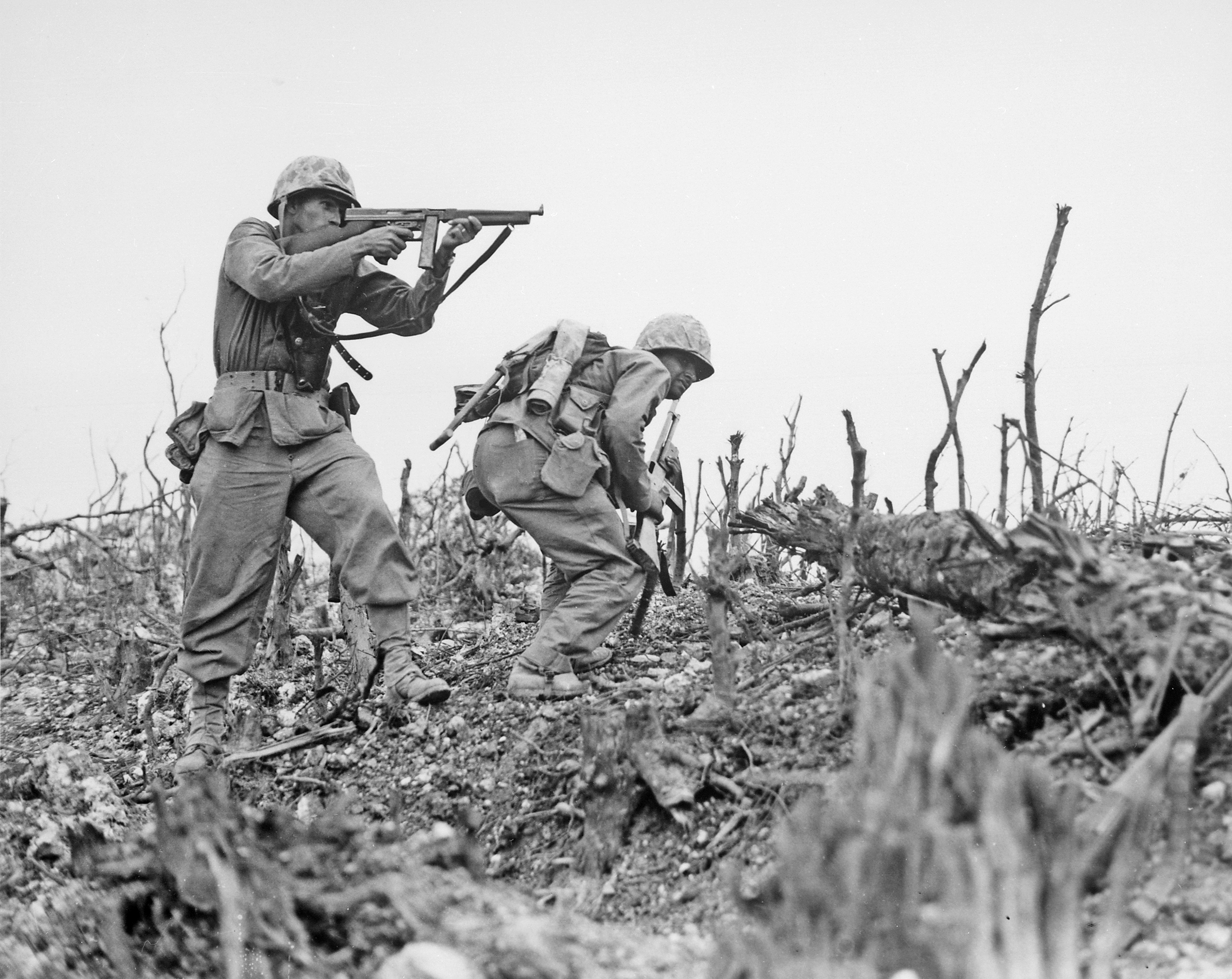
Two Marines, Davis P. Hargraves with Thompson submachine gun and Gabriel Chavarria with BAR, of 2nd Battalion, 1st Marines, advance on Wana Ridge on May 18, 1945.

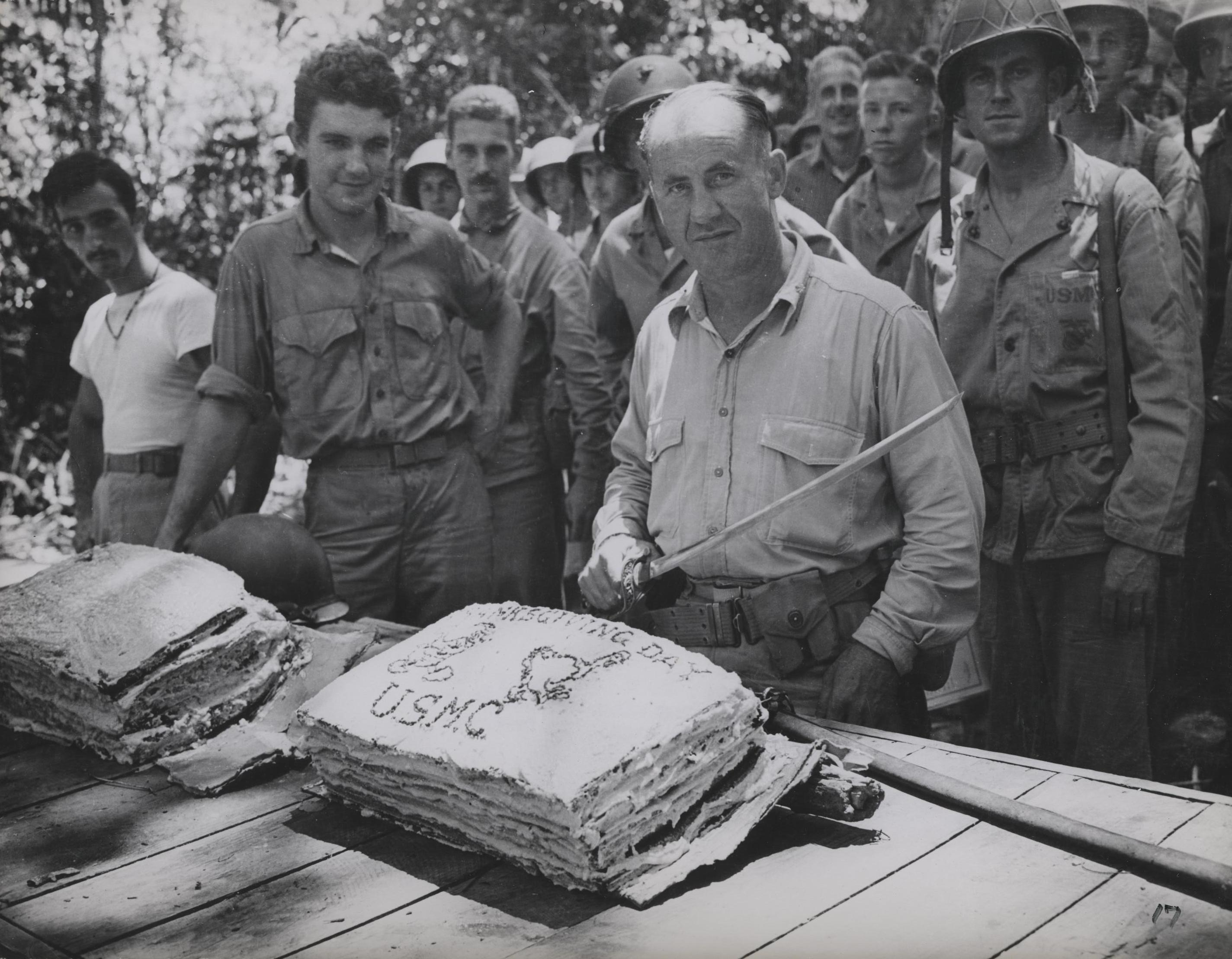
Lt. Colonel William W. Stickney cuts a Thanksgiving cake with a Japanese officer's sword at Guadalcanal, as marines of 2nd Battalion look on.

The battalion was reactivated March 1, 1941, at Guantanamo Bay, Cuba, as the 2nd Battalion, 1st Marines and was assigned to the 1st Marine Division of the Fleet Marine Force. The force was active for only a brief period of time, during which it was deployed to Marine Corps Recruit Depot Parris Island, South Carolina. The unit was again deactivated on June 14, 1941.

Shortly after the United States entered into World War II, the unit was reactivated February 11, 1942, at New River, North Carolina. It was again assigned to the 1st Marine Division, which deployed in July 1942 to Wellington, New Zealand. The battalion participated in numerous campaigns in the Pacific Theater of WWII, and was a part of the American advance into Japanese territory in the Pacific. The first of these was the Guadalcanal Campaign, during which the battalion defended Henderson Field, an airfield on Guadalcanal, and withstood Japanese bombings of the strategic location. They later participated in Operation Cartwheel, specifically the Battle of Cape Gloucester, during which they withstood several Japanese Banzai charges. Later, during the Battle of Peleliu, the unit suffered heavy casualties during their defense of the Umurbrogal Pocket. In their last engagement in the Pacific, the unit participated in the decisive Battle of Okinawa, taking part in the capture of Shuri during poor weather conditions.

At the close of World War II, in September 1945, the unit was redeployed to Tiensin, China, where they were a part of the occupation of northern China until October 1947, when the unit was deactivated.

=== Korean War and early 1960s ===
2nd Battalion was reactivated August 4, 1950, at Camp Lejeune, North Carolina, and again assigned to the 1st Marine Division, Fleet Marine Force. It was almost immediately deployed to Kobe, Japan in preparation for its participation in the Korean War from September 1950 – July 1953, during which it fought at Inchon-Seoul, Chosin Reservoir, the East Central Front, and the Western Front. After the war, the unit aided in the defense of the Korean Demilitarized Zone.

On September 20, 1950. The 2nd Battalion, 1st Marines set up a L-shaped ambush near Yongdungpo. A North Korean column of hundreds of NKPA troops and five T-34 tanks headed blindly into the ambush set by the Marines. Short-range fire from Marine 3.5-inch bazookas knocked out the first two enemy tanks; a storm of direct and indirect fire cut down the supporting infantry, killing 300 North Korean men. The surviving North Koreans withdrew to their prepared defenses within Yongdungpo.

After the war, in April 1955, the unit was relocated to Camp Pendleton, California, where it participated in the transplacement system between the 1st and 3rd Marine Divisions.

=== Vietnam War ===
- Deployed during November 1965 to South Vietnam, and assigned to the 3rd Marine Division, Fleet Marine Force
- Participated in the War in Vietnam, November 1965 – May 1971,
  - Thừa Thiên Province
  - Huế/Phu Bai)
  - Quảng Nam Province
  - Da Nang Air Base
  - Quảng Trị Province
  - Quảng Tín Province
- Major Operations and Battles
  - Operation Oregon Quảng Trị Province Mar 20–23, 1966
  - Operation Hastings/Operation Deckhouse II Quảng Trị Province Jul 7 – August 3, 1966
  - Thủy Bồ incident Quảng Nam province Jan 31 – Feb 1, 1967, According to Vietnamese communist sources, from 31 January to 1 February 1967, Company H massacred up to 145 Vietnamese civilians, while according to American sources, 101 Vietcong and 22 civilians were killed in two days of fighting with Vietcong insurgents who occupied the village. The Americans suffered 5 dead and 26 wounded.
  - Operation Union I/Operation Lien Ket 102 Quảng Nam and Quảng Tín Provinces Apr 21 – May 17, 1967
  - Operation Medina Quảng Trị Province Oct 11–20, 1967
  - Operation Kentucky Quảng Trị Province November 1, 1967 – February 28, 1968
  - Operation Napoleon/Saline Quảng Trị Province Feb 19 – December 9, 1968
  - Battle of Huế Thừa Thiên Province January 30 – March 3, 1968
  - Operation Scotland II Quảng Trị Province April 15, 1968 – February 28, 1969
- Detached during April 1971 from the 1st Marine Division, and reassigned to the 3rd Marine Amphibious Brigade, Fleet Marine Force
- Relocated during June 1971 to Camp Pendleton, CA, and reassigned to the 1st Marine Division, Fleet Marine Force

=== Post War and the 1980s and 1990s ===
- Participated during April – May 1975 in Operation New Arrivals, the relocation of refugees from Indochina
- Participated in the Battalion rotation between the 3rd Marine Division on Okinawa and Divisions stationed in the United States during the 1980s
- Deactivated January 24, 1989
- Reactivated September 9, 1994, at Camp Pendleton, CA, and assigned to the 1st Marine Division.

In June 1995, 2nd Battalion, 1st Marines deployed as part of the 11th Marine Expeditionary Unit (MEU), departing San Diego on 23 June for a Western Pacific (WESTPAC) and Central Command (CENTCOM) deployment. During the Middle East portion of the cruise, the battalion operated in Jordan, Kuwait, Bahrain, and the United Arab Emirates, conducting bilateral training, security cooperation, and contingency readiness missions with regional partner forces.

=== Global war on terrorism ===
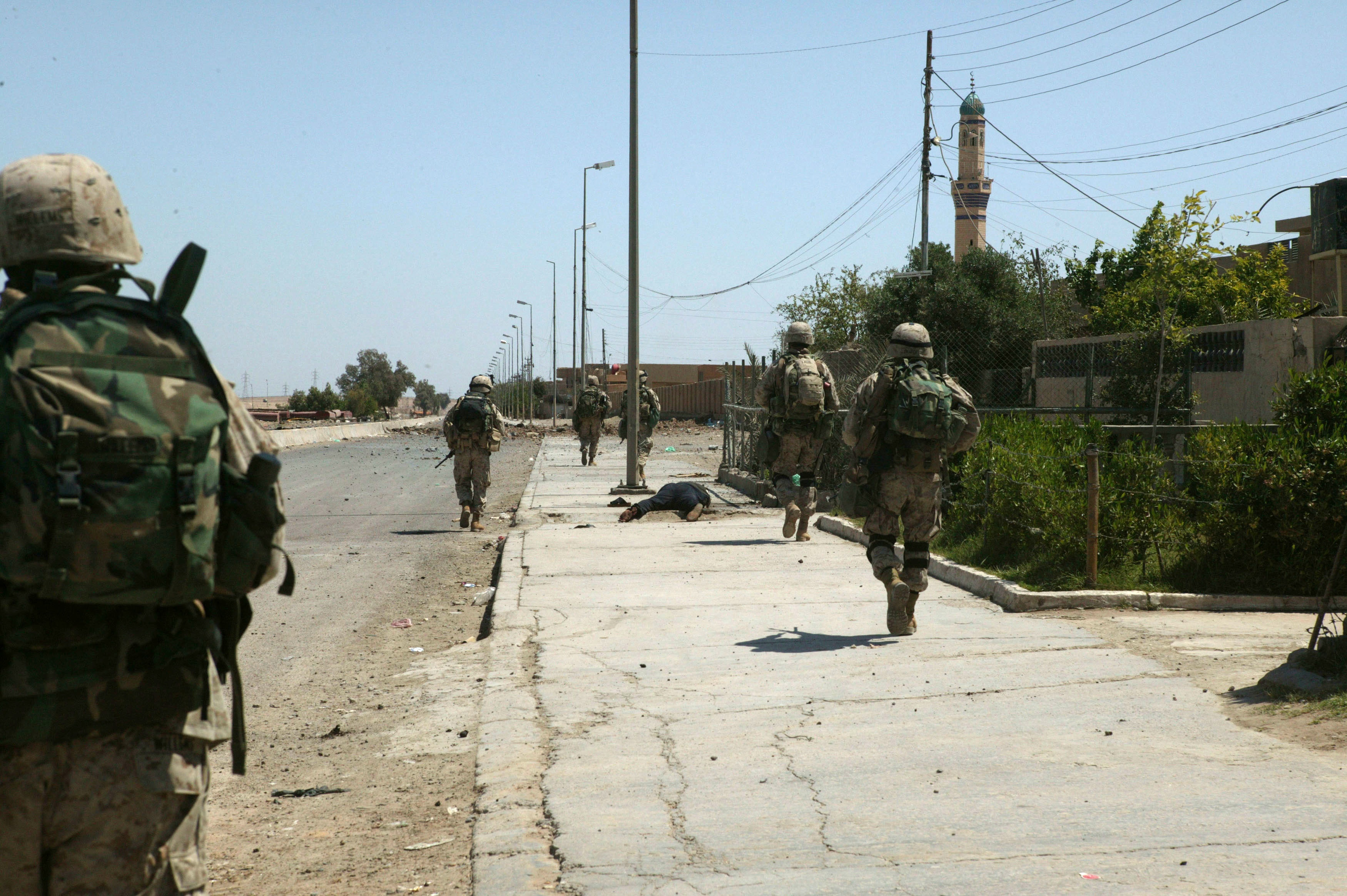
Marines from Echo Company passing the body of an alleged Iraqi insurgent during the First Battle of Fallujah.

As part of the 15th Marine Expeditionary Unit, the battalion deployed to Kuwait in February 2003, and participated in the invasion of Iraq in March 2003. The battalion deployed in March 2004, to Fallujah, Iraq and took part in Operation Vigilant Resolve. They returned to Iraq in 2005 with the 13th Marine Expeditionary Unit and engaged in combat operations during Operation Steel Curtain in Husaybah, Karabilah, and New Ubaydi, and Operation Iron Hammer in Hit. The battalion deployed to Okinawa to serve as the Ground Combat Unit for the 31st Marine Expeditionary Unit from January 1, 2007, until January 1, 2008. The battalion deployed to Iraq in January 2009 and returned in August of the same year.

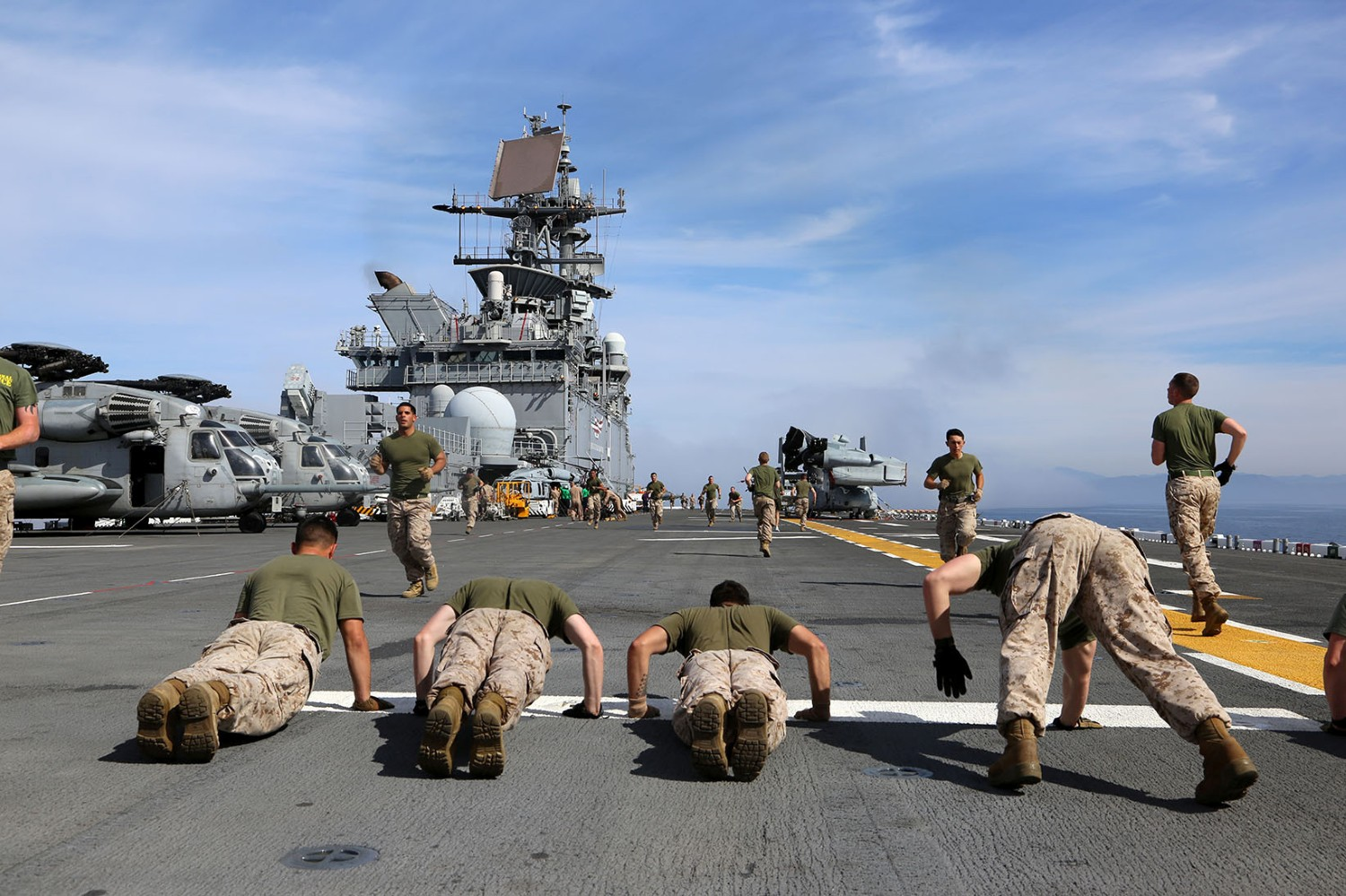
Marines with Golf Company of 2nd Battalion conduct physical training on the flight deck of the USS Makin Island during Amphibious Squadron Marine Expeditionary Unit Integration, off the coast of San Diego, California, April 2014.

The battalion deployed to Afghanistan in October 2010 through May 15, 2011, in support of Operation Enduring Freedom. They operated in the Garmsir District, Helmand Province. In June 2012, the battalion returned to Okinawa as the Ground Combat Element for the 31st Marine Expeditionary Unit. In March 2014, 2/1 deployed as the Ground Combat Element of the 11th MEU.

The battalion lost nine Marines and one Navy Corpsman on August 26, 2021, in a deadly suicide bomber attack during the withdrawal from Kabul's Hamid Karzai International Airport. The ISIS-K terror group claimed responsibility for the suicide bombing seeking to disrupt the massive evacuation effort of Americans, Afghan allies and third-party nationals outside the U.S.-held airport. The attack in total took the lives of 13 American Servicemen and women.

== Unit awards ==
A unit citation or commendation is an award bestowed upon an organization for the action cited. Members of the unit who participated in said actions are allowed to wear on their uniforms the awarded unit citation. 2/1 has been presented with the following awards:

Ribbon	Unit Award
	Presidential Unit Citation with one Silver and four Bronze Stars
	Joint Meritorious Unit Award
	Navy Unit Commendation with three Bronze Stars
	Meritorious Unit Commendation with four Bronze Stars
	Marine Corps Expeditionary Medal
	American Defense Service Medal with one Bronze Star
	Asiatic-Pacific Campaign Medal with one Silver and one Bronze Star
	World War II Victory Medal
	Navy Occupation Service Medal with Asia clasp
	China Service Medal
	National Defense Service Medal with three Bronze Stars
	Armed Forces Expeditionary Medal
	Vietnam Service Medal with two Silver and three Bronze Stars
	Korean Presidential unit Citation
	Vietnam Cross of Gallantry with Palm Streamer
	Vietnam Meritorious Unit Citation Civil Action Medal
	Southwest Asia Service Medal
	Afghanistan Campaign Medal with one Bronze Star
	Iraq Campaign Medal with three Bronze Stars
	Global War on Terrorism Expeditionary Medal
	Global War on Terrorism Service Medal
	Korea Defense Service Medal
NATO Non-Article 5 medal for	ISAF

== Notable former members ==
- Troy E. Black – 19th Sergeant Major of the Marine Corps
- John L. Estrada - 15th Sergeant Major of the Marine Corps; former US Ambassador to Trinidad and Tobago
- Raymond Kelly – NYPD Commissioner
- Charles C. Krulak – 31st Commandant of the Marine Corps from July 1, 1995, to June 30, 1999
- Robert Leckie – author of Helmet for My Pillow
- Gen Peter Pace – former Chairman of the Joint Chiefs of Staff
- Sidney Phillips - war correspondent
- Lewis Burwell Puller, Jr. – son of General Lewis "Chesty" Puller and Pulitzer prize winning author
- Douglas Zembiec – The "Lion of Fallujah"
- PFC Dale M. Hansen – Medal of Honor recipient for actions during the Battle of Okinawa
- Cody Alford - Youngest E-8 in Marine Corps history and former Marine Raider and Scout Sniper
- Dylan Bleak - Youngest former Marine Raider and Scout Sniper in Marine Corps history

== Motto ==
Get Results

Uphold The Legacy

Never Quit

Spirited Ethos

Mutual Trust

Ownership

Know Your Stuff

Everyday Counts Towards Combat Effectiveness

== See also ==
- List of United States Marine Corps battalions
- Organization of the United States Marine Corps
