= Battle of Husaybah (2004) =

Iraq war battle

- Part of the Iraq War
Date	April 17, 2004
Location	Husaybah, Iraq
Result	U.S. victory

Belligerents
United States	Iraqi insurgency

Strength
127 troops	600 insurgents

Casualties and losses
5 killed 36 wounded	270 killed 40 captured

The Battle of Husaybah was fought in the spring of 2004 at the same time as the First Battle of Fallujah. In April 2004, Fallujah was under siege by United States Marines, and insurgents were looking to relieve pressure on the city by attempting an offensive of their own. Ten days before, the highway connecting Al Anbar to Baghdad was cut and the insurgents attacked the capital of the province, Ramadi. The attack was repulsed by the Marines and the battle resulted in heavy casualties on both sides. Now the insurgents were ready for another attack which would serve as third location attacked in a simultaneous assault against U.S. forces, on the city of Husaybah on the Syrian border. Infantry elements of 3rd Battalion, 7th Marine Regiment Lima Company, 2 platoons from India Company, 2 platoons from Kilo Company and CAAT (Combined Anti-armor team) White, were deployed to Husaybah to counter the enemy offensive.

== The battle ==
An estimated 600 Iraqis from Fallujah and Ramadi launched an assault against the Americans in Husaybah. The insurgents engaged the Marines on the outskirts of the city first with a roadside bombing and a continuous barrage from mortar positions. The Iraqi forces followed up the bombing with heavy small-arms and machine-gun fire near a former Ba'ath Party headquarters. The Marines engaged the enemy for several hours before additional reinforcements were dispatched to assist the outnumbered Marine positions. The reinforcing platoons were also hit as they were entering the city. Very soon heavy street fighting ensued which lasted the entire day. The Marines had to clear two-story buildings block by block. Most of the fighting was centered along a street in the northern part of the town which the Marines called "East End Street". Insurgents were on both sides of the street and were constantly laying down fire at the Marines. The fighting slowed a bit after the Marines cleared a house used by the insurgents as a stronghold which they later nicknamed "The Crack House", but fighting continued late into the night. Unfortunately, in addition to the heavy casualties suffered by the U.S. Marines, Lima Company's Commander, Major Gannon, was killed in action during the battle. While attempting to link up with his Weapons Platoon Commander to gain a better vantage point of the battle field, Major Gannon entered an area that was occupied by four enemy insurgents and was killed. During the clearing of the building by Broad Sword and Weapons Platoon, Major Gannon was located and evacuated. The U.S base in Husaybah was renamed Camp Gannon in his honor.

== Aftermath ==
Five marines were killed along with 270 insurgents in the fierce battle that lasted 28 hours. Another 36 marines were wounded and 40 insurgents captured.
