= Battle of Ramadi =

Battle of Ramadi may refer to one of the following:

- Battles of Ramadi (1917), battles between British and Ottoman Empire forces in September 1917 during the First World War
- Battle of Ramadi (2004), part of the Iraq War
- Battle of Ramadi (2006), part of the Iraq War
- Battle of Ramadi (2013–2014), part of the War in Iraq (2013–2017)
- Battle of Ramadi (2014–2015), part of the War in Iraq (2013–2017)
- Battle of Ramadi (2015–2016), part of the War in Iraq (2013–2017)
