= Al Ubaidi =

- Town
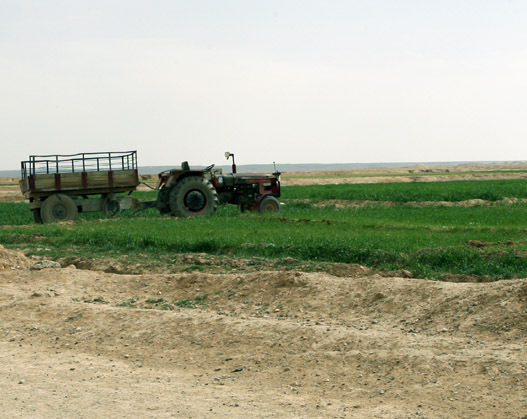
- Countryside surrounding Al Ubaidi
- Interactive map of Al Ubaidi
- Location in Iraq
- Coordinates: 34°3′0″N 41°50′0″E
- Country: Iraq
- Governorate: Al Anbar
- District: Al-Qa'im

Government
  - Body: City council
- Time zone: UTC+3 (GMT+3)
- Postal code: 31017

Al Ubaidi (or Al Obaidi) is a town in the Al Anbar Governorate of Iraq.

The town is situated along the south side of Euphrates River near Iraq's border with Syrian. It is a subdistrict of Al Qa'im and contains both New Ubaydi and Old Ubaydi as well as a number of smaller villages that stretch down the Euphrates to the east.

During the Iraq War, the city was patrolled by United States Marines, and was the location of a forward operating base, a US military base, as well as several battle positions.

Following Operation Steel Curtain, in which US Marines and Iraqi Army units swept the city of insurgents, the streets were secured by a combination of Iraqi Army and Marine forces.

Old Ubaydi is the stronghold of the Al-Bu Mahal tribe, which was the first tribe in the region to openly cooperate with coalition forces and fight the insurgency. New Ubaydi is a modern style city, complete with city planning. It was built to support the workers of the Al Qaim Phosphate plant, which is located to the southwest of Ubaydi. The villages to the east that fall under Ubaydi's jurisdiction comprise a mix of tribes including Mahal, Rawi, and Salmani. These villages are mostly populated by farmers and fishermen.

Ubaydi has a functioning city council and mayor and a fully operational police force.

The militant group Islamic State of Iraq and the Levant captured the city in 2014. The Iraqi Army recaptured the city in November 2017.
