= Al-Qa'im District =

Al-Qa'im District قضاء القائم
- District
- Location in Iraq
- Country: Iraq
- Governorates: Al Anbar Governorate

Population
  - Total: 140,923
- Time zone: UTC+3 (AST)

Al-Qa'im District (Arabic: قضاء القائم) is a district in Al Anbar Governorate, Iraq, on the border with Syria. It is centred on the town of Al-Qa'im. The Euphrates river flows through it. At its western end, in the city of Husaybah, is the Al-Qa'im border crossing to Abu Kamal in Syria's Deir ez-Zor Governorate.

== Cities ==
- Al-Qa'im
- Al-Karābilah
- Al Ubaidi
- Al Ramanah
