= Al Anbar Governorate =

Governorate of Iraq

Al Anbar Province محافظة الأنبار Anbar Province
- Governorate
- Anbar Governorate
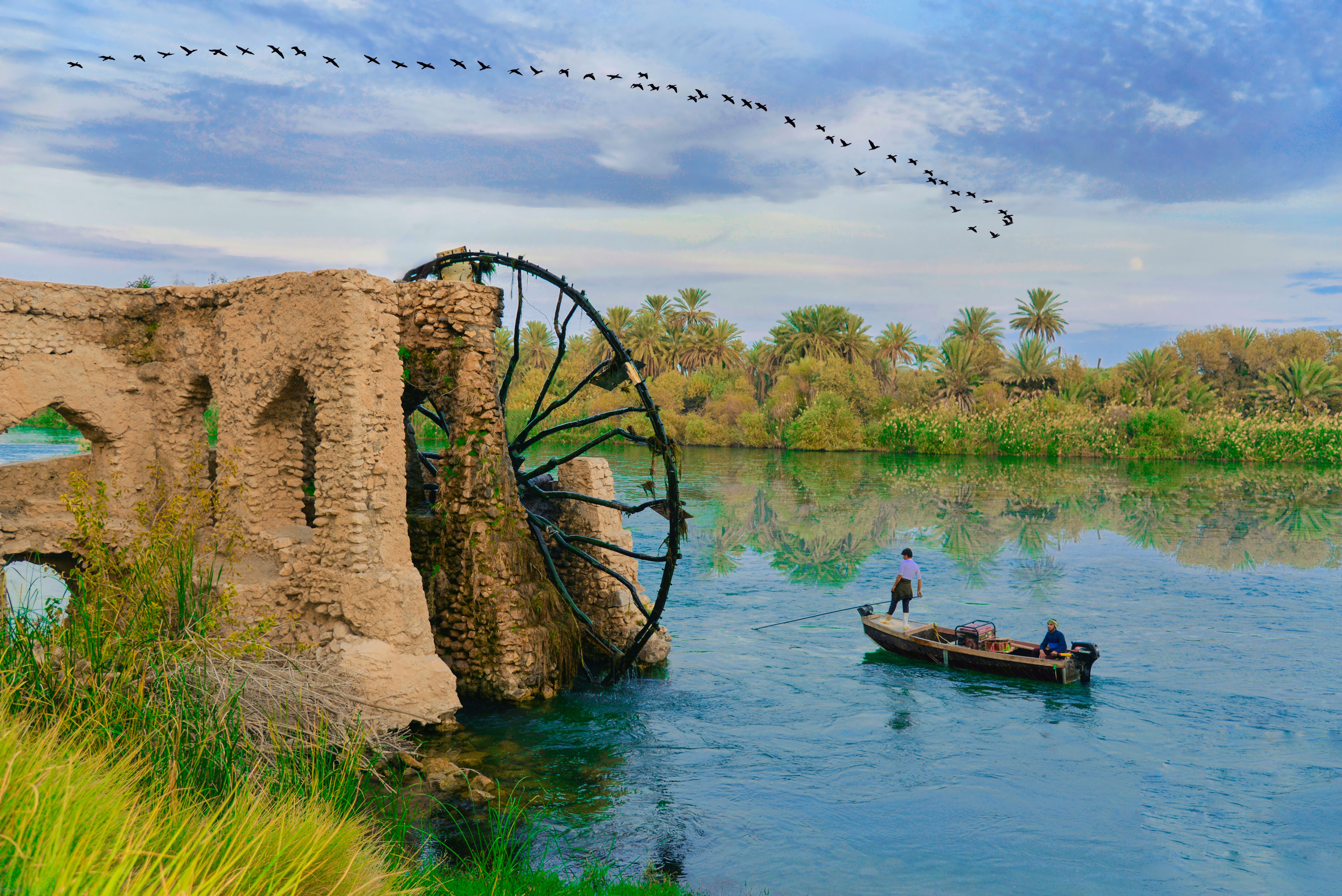
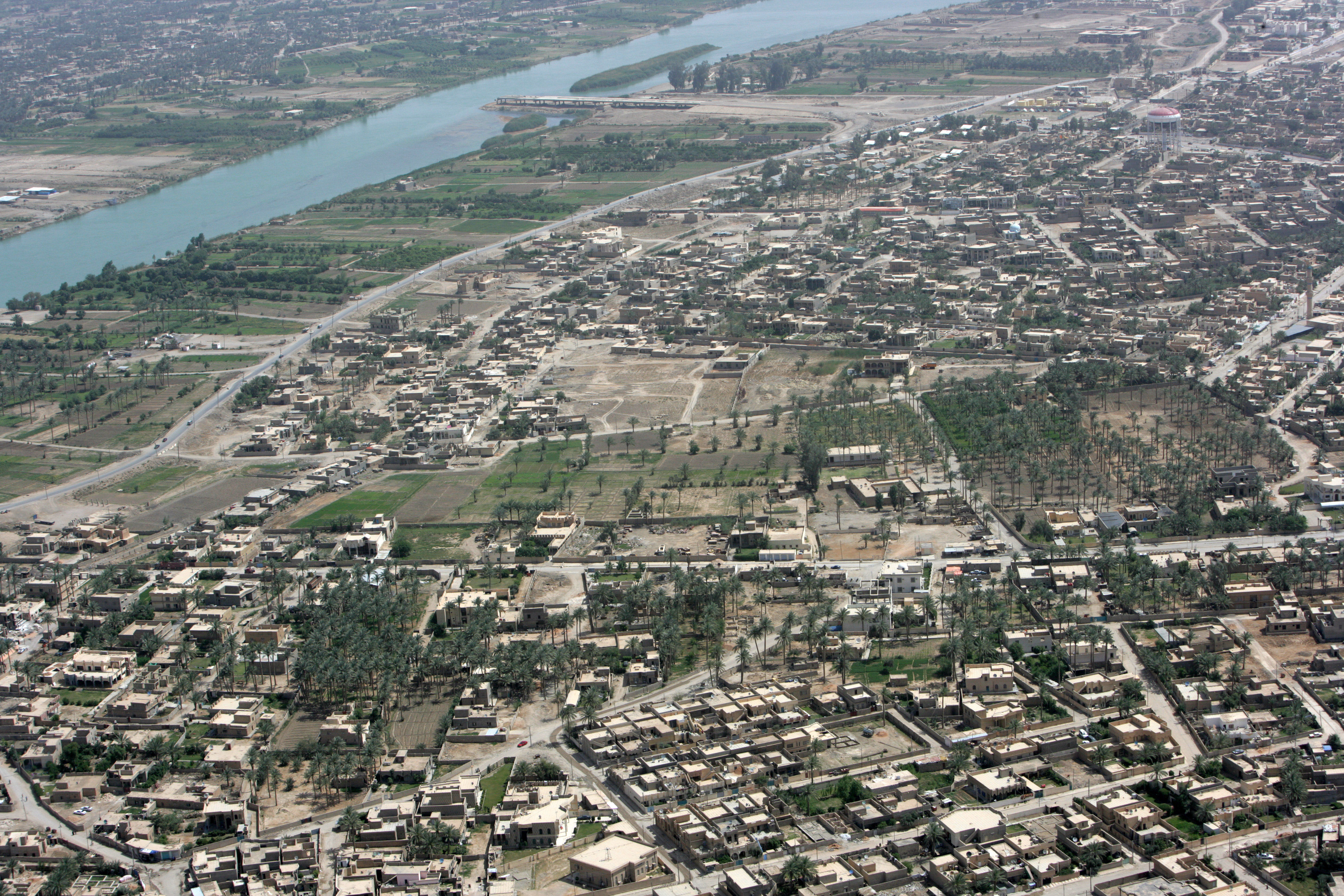
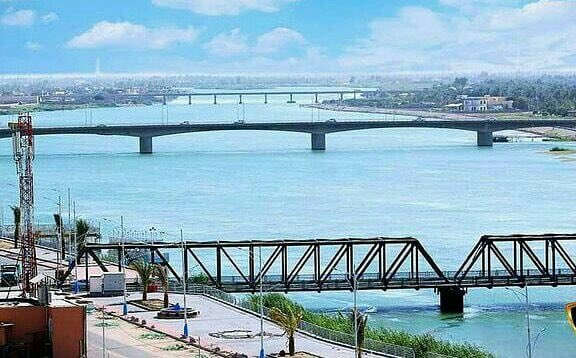
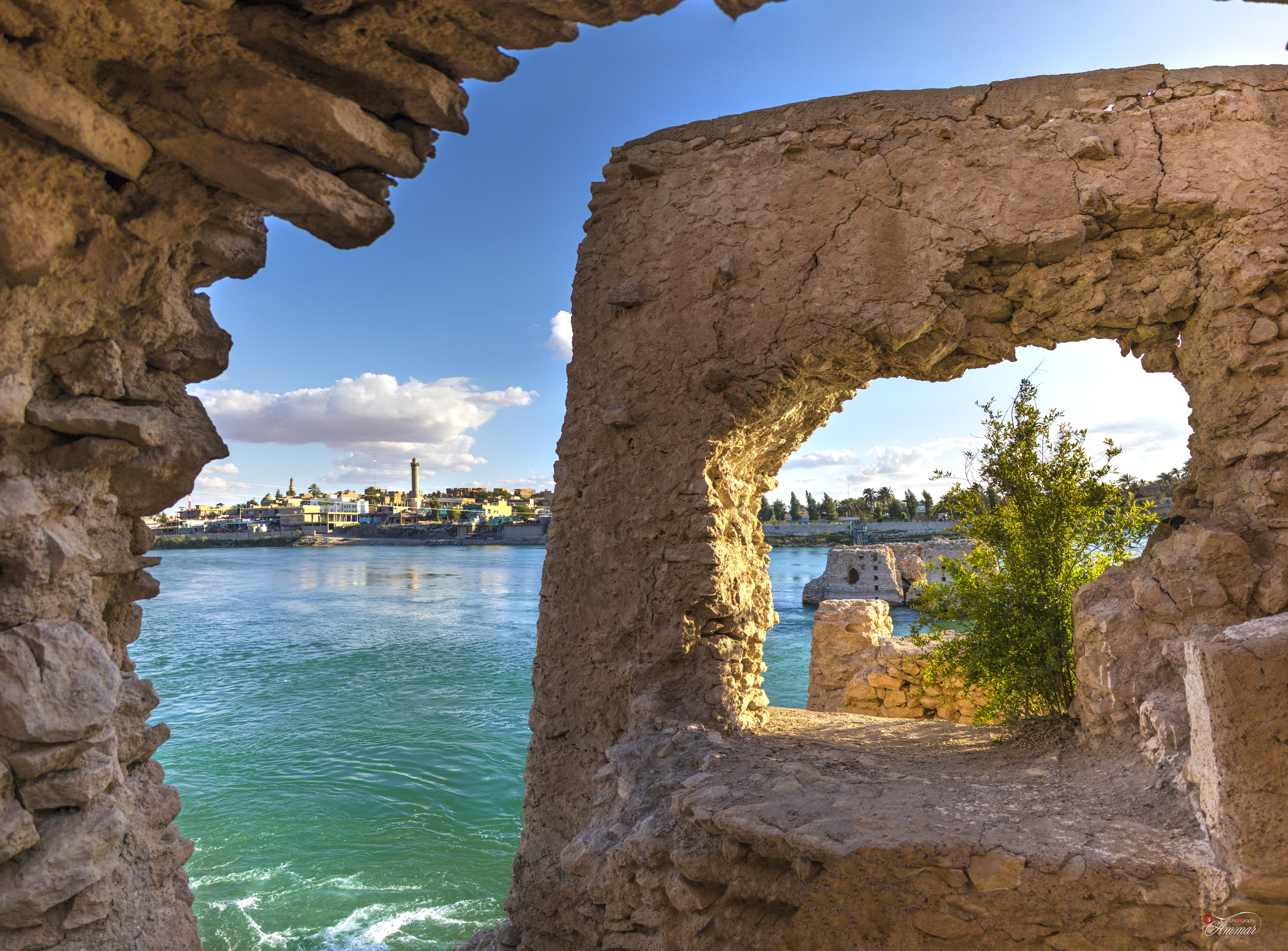
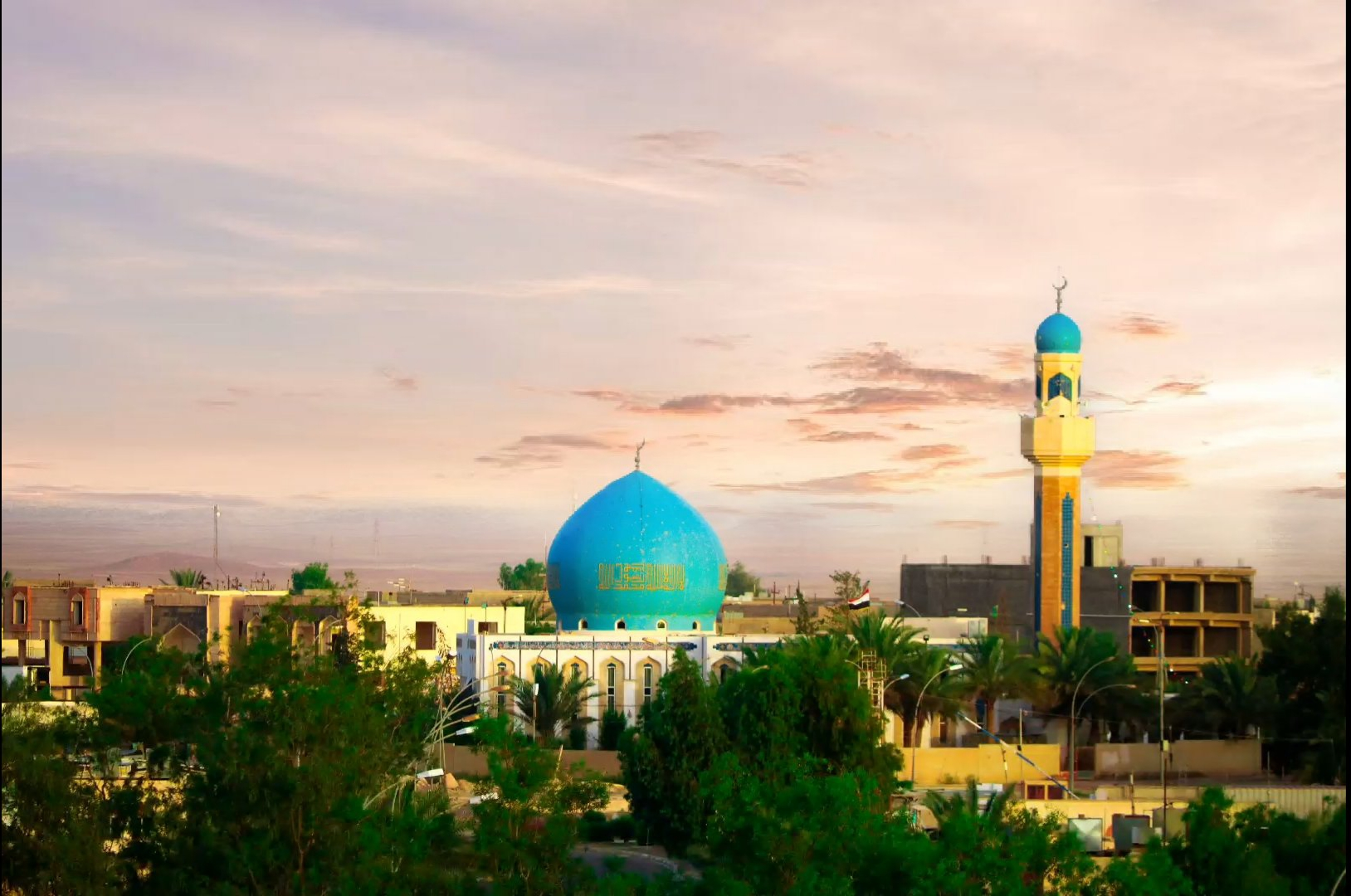
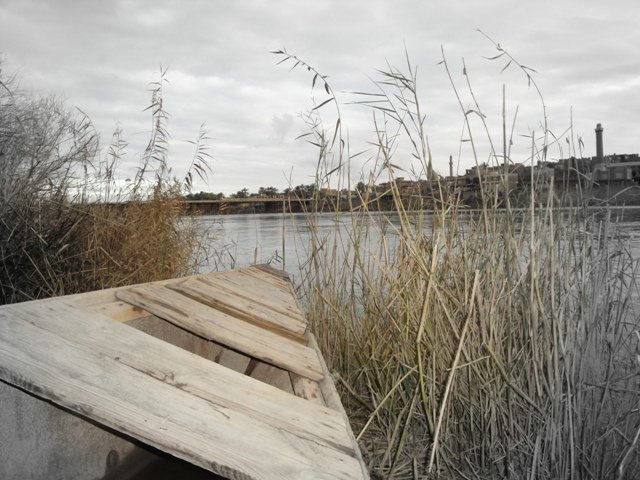

- Seal

- Coordinates: 32°54′N 41°36′E
- Country: Iraq
- Seat: Ramadi

Government
  - Type: Provincial Government
  - Body: Council of Anbar Province
  - Governor: Omar Mishaan Dabous

Area
  - Total: 138,501 km^{2} (53,476 sq mi)
  - Water: 2,350 km^{2} (910 sq mi)
  - Rank: 1st
- Elevation: 45 m (148 ft)
- Highest elevation: 450 m (1,480 ft)
- Lowest elevation: 35 m (115 ft)

Population (2024 census)
  - Total: 2,004,418
  - Rank: 8th
  - Density: 14.4722/km^{2} (37.4829/sq mi)
- Time zone: UTC+3
- ISO 3166 code: IQ-AN
- HDI (2024): 0.723 high · 6th of 18
- Website: anbar.iq

Al Anbar Governorate (Arabic: محافظة الأنبار; muḥāfaẓat al-’Anbār), or Anbar Province, is the largest governorate in Iraq by area. Encompassing much of the country's western territory, it shares borders with Syria, Jordan, and Saudi Arabia. The population is mostly Sunni Arabs. The provincial capital is Ramadi; other important cities include Fallujah, Al-Qa'im, Rawah and Haditha.

The governorate was known as Ramadi up to 1976 when it was renamed as Al Anbar governorate, and it was known as Dulaim before 1962. A large majority of the inhabitants of the province are Arab Sunni Muslims and most belong to the Dulaim tribe.

Al-Anbar Governorate, holding many Sunni previous supporters of Saddam Hussein, was a major center of the primarily Sunni, Islamist and Ba'athist-affiliated Iraqi insurgency, being the place of the battles in Fallujah and Ramadi.

In early 2014, the Islamic State of Iraq and the Levant, with the assistance of some local Sunni militias, launched a successful campaign to seize control of the province from the Iraqi government. Numerous offensive actions were undertaken by the Iraqi government, with the assistance of local Sunni tribes to remove ISIL's occupation of the province, especially in the Anbar campaign (2015–16), the Western Anbar offensive (September 2017) and the 2017 Western Iraq campaign. The area was effectively recaptured by the end of 2017 and has been at peace since then.

== Etymology ==
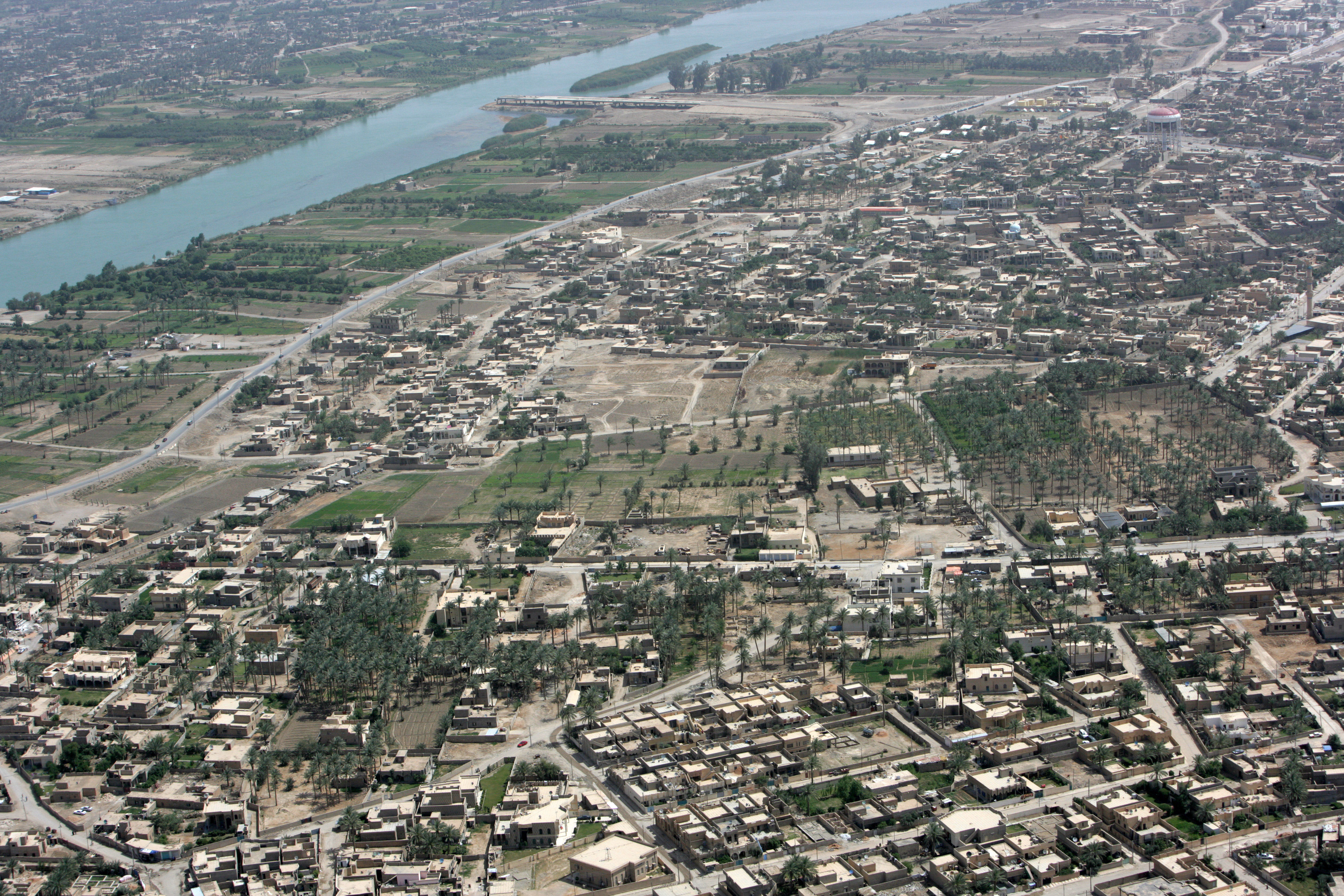
Aerial view of the Euphrates River in Ramadi, the capital of Anbar governorate.

The name of the governorate in Persian language means "warehouse" or "silo". This was the last stop/warehouses on the old Silk Road toward Syria. The name is pre-Islamic. The name of the governorate is taken over from a historic city that was originally located on its territory and whose ruins can still be seen 5 km northwest of Fallujah near the city of Saqlawiyah today. This city of Anbār or Peroz-Shapur was founded in the 3rd century by the Muntherids and was, before the Arab conquest in 634, the second-largest city of Iraq. It was abandoned after the Mongol invasion in the 14th century. A pseudo-authentication is offered by proposing that the name is Arabic and stands for "granaries" in Arabic, further proposing the word Anbar (أنبار) to be the plural of Nbr (نبر) which meaning "grains". The name was already in use in Pre-Islamic times during the Sasanian rule over Iraq, long before Arabic replaced Aramaic as the main language of Iraq.

Dulaim is the old name of the governorate due to the Dulaim tribe inhabiting the region. It was also called Liwa Al-Dulaim (لواء الدليم) in the Ottoman period and Sanjak Al-Dulaim in the seventeenth century.

== History ==
=== Caliphate period ===
During the reign of Rashidun Caliph Abu bakr the conquest of Anbar was launched his successors conquered whole Middle East.

== Geography ==
Anbar is one of the driest governorates in Iraq's western desert climate. Some of Al Anbar is part of the Syrian Desert, characterized by steppe and desert terrain. Most of Al Anbar is considered as a topographical continuation of the Arabian Peninsula plateau region. It has some small hills and a number of wadis, including Wadi Hauran. Given a decline in land preservation and a lack of natural vegetation, the land is often exposed to the elements and prone to severe erosion.

Among the most important agricultural crops are potatoes, which are harvested in spring and fall. Wheat, barley and maize (corn) are also commonly grown in the governorate. Al Anbar is also known for the production of phosphates and fertilizer. It is also rich in mineral such as sulphur, gold and oil. However, Anbar has not been extensively explored for oil.

Al Anbar Governorate within Iraq

=== Climate ===
The average rainfall in Al Anbar is 115 millimeters (4.53 in) per year. Summer temperatures may reach as high as 52°C (125°F) and may fall as low as 0°C (32°F) in the winter. The Euphrates River is the main water source for residents of the governorate. The river flows southeasterly through seven of Al Anbar's districts:

- Al-Qa'im District
- Anah District
- Haditha District
- Hit District
- Rawah District
- Ramadi District
- Fallujah District
- Ar-Rutba District

== Government ==
- Governor: Sheikh Mohammed Ali Wilber Al-Dulaimi
- Deputy Governor: Ibrahim Al Asal
- Technical Governor's Councilor: Engineer Adil Bardan
- Provincial Council Chairman (PCC): Ahmed Hamid al-Alwani

== Demographics ==
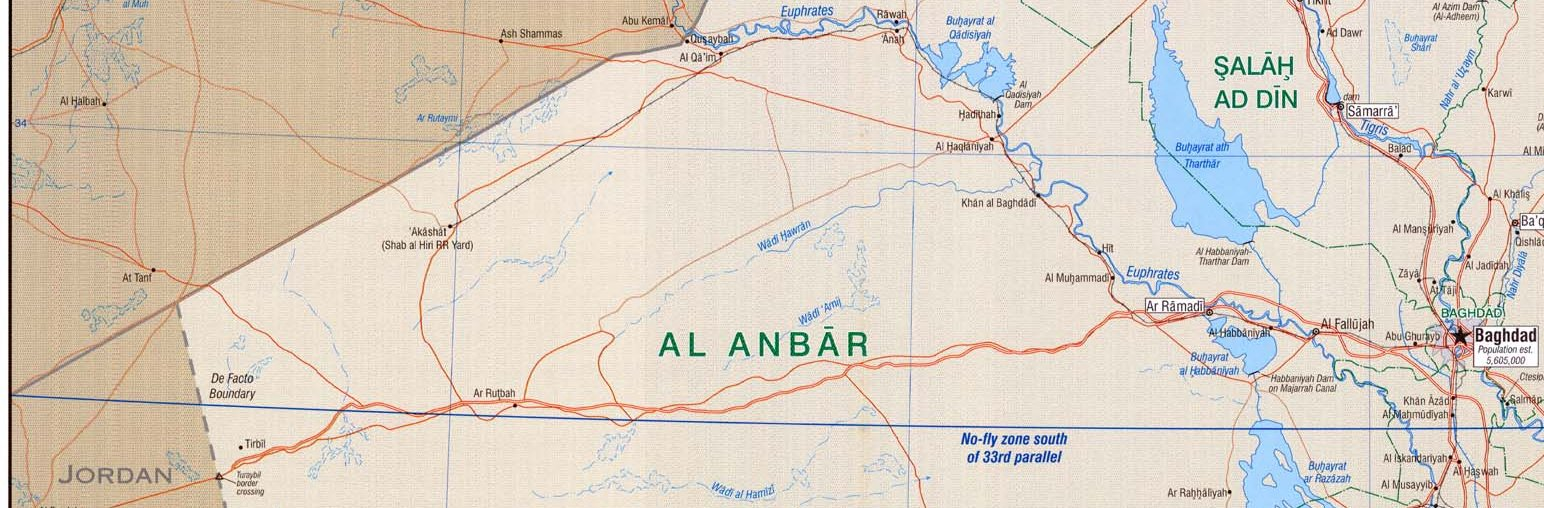
The main cities of Al Anbar

Historical population
Year	Pop.	±% p.a.
1977	466,100	—
1987	820,690	+5.82%
1997	1,023,736	+2.24%
2009	1,483,359	+3.14%
2024	2,004,418	+2.03%
Source: Citypopulation

In the 1920s, the governorate had a population of 250,000, as did Baghdad, out of a total population of 2 million in Iraq. Today there are 9 million people living in Baghdad, among them a million Anbari people in the city and suburbs; their origins are the people of the Al-Anbar tribes that have moved to Baghdad during the past 500 years and their recent migrations there during the 1920s and 1930s.

Half of the residents in Anbar are living on the banks of the Euphrates River outside cities and the towns, there were between 1.9 million and 2 million inhabitants in the districts of Al Anbar. The largest cities are Ramadi (pop. 900,000) and Fallujah (700,000).

Districts	Population
Ramadi	620,480
Fallujah	590,354
Khalidiya	44,274
Heet	120,414
Al-Qa'im	180,646
Rutba	49,118
Haditha	107,384
Anah	38,154
Rawa	29,643

According to UN estimate in 2003 the population of Al Anbar is 1,230,169. There are no precise estimates of the population which include all of the cities and towns and villages in Anbar. According to a 2003 estimate by the NGO Coordination Committee in Iraq, the population was 1,230,140.

It is estimated that around 90 percent of Anbar's inhabitants are adherents of the Sunni branch of Islam. The remaining ten percent are either Shias or other minorities.

== Important mosques in Al Anbar Governorate ==
The governorate contains a lot of mosques, monuments, and shrines.

Mosque	City
Great state Masjid	Ramadi
Great Masjid of Ramadi	Ramadi
Masjid of Sadiq al-Amin	Ramadi

== Governors Al Anbar Governorate (since 2003) ==
List of governors in post-Ba'athist Iraq:

- Abdul Karim Bujras al-Rawi
- Faisal Al Gaood (acting)
- Raja Nawaf Farhan al-Mahalawi
- Mamoon Sami Rashid al-Alawani
- Qasim Al-Fahadawi
- Ahmad Khalaf Muhammed al-Dulaimi
- Suhaib al-Rawi
- Mohammed Rikan Al Halbousi
- Ali Farhan Hameed

== Anbar during U.S. occupation ==
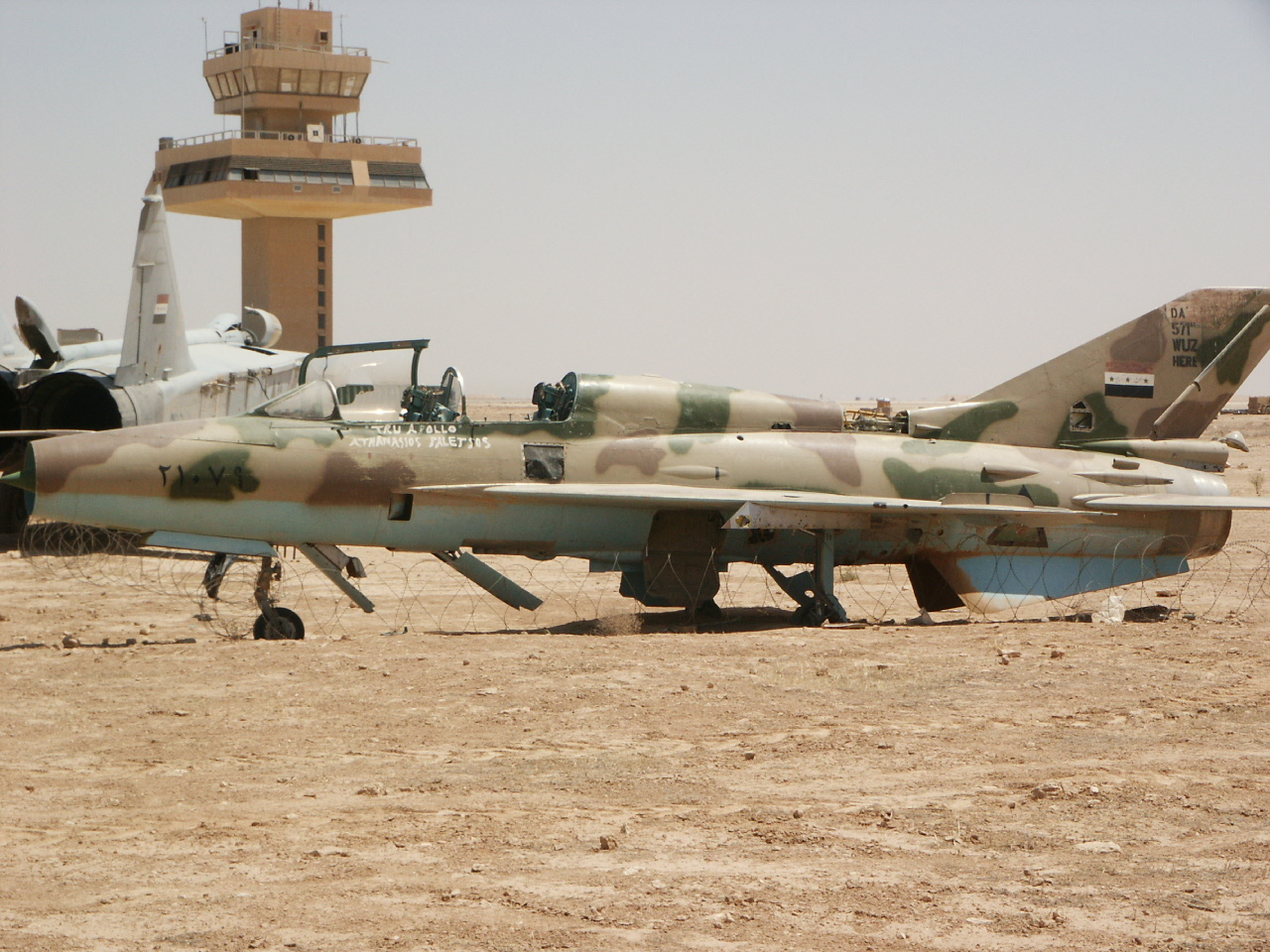
Abandoned Iraqi Air Force J-7 aircraft in front of the Al Asad Airbase ATC Tower

The geographic challenge of the Anbar Governorate is demonstrated by two contrasting facts: while it is Iraq's largest governorate, it also is the most sparsely populated. For a governorate that is approximately the size of Bangladesh, it is home to fewer than 1.8 million Iraqis. Most of the population lives in the major cities, like Ramadi and Fallujah, and almost everyone else lives within a short distance of the Euphrates River that snakes from Baghdad to the Syrian border near Al-Qa'im. Its strategic challenge was demonstrated, in part, by casualty statistics. During the first four years of Operation Iraqi Freedom (OIF), the Anbar Province was the deadliest province for American service members, claiming approximately one-third of American fatalities.

The Anbar Province was the Sunni stronghold that had long provided Saddam Hussein with the support he needed to remain in power. During the early years of Operation Iraqi Freedom, it provided an important base for Al Qaeda and insurgent operations. Part of its significance came from the fact that the Western Euphrates River Valley served as an important infiltration route for foreign fighters headed to Iraq's heartland. The New York Times compared this region to the Vietnam War's Ho Chi Minh trail, as foreign fighters and insurgents used the river valley to move in relative safety from the Syrian border to cities like Baghdad, Ramadi and Fallujah.

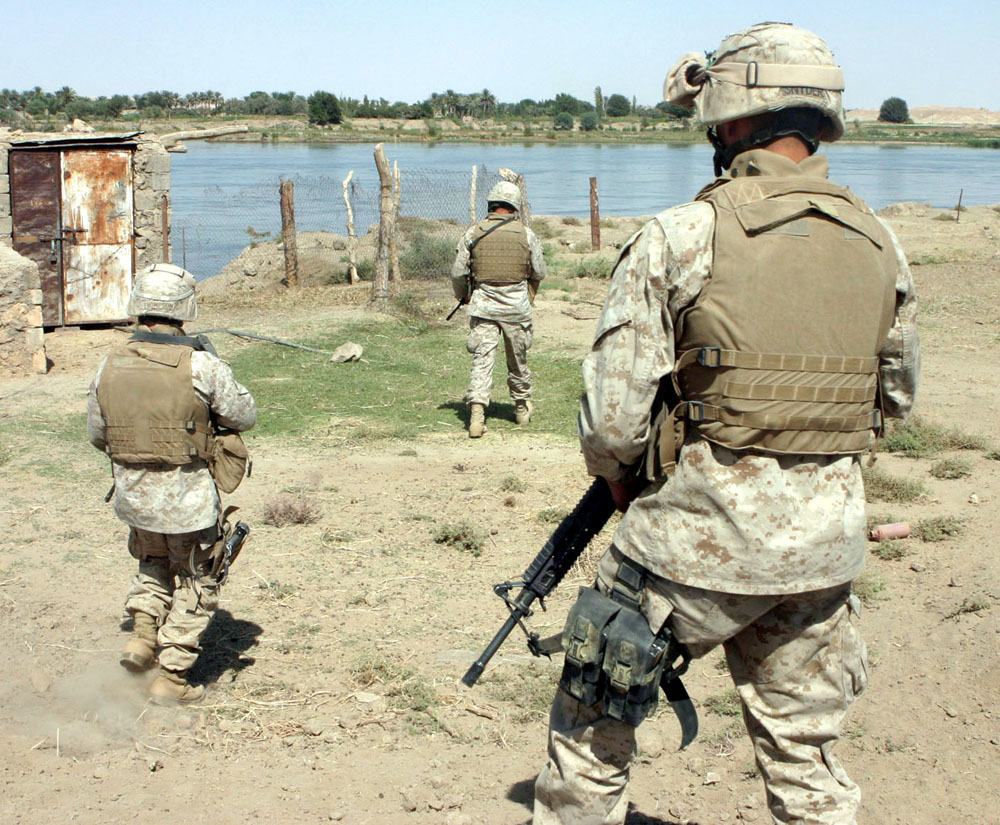
US Marines patrol along the Euphrates River in Anbar Province

The contrast between the fertile Euphrates River Valley and the rest of the province is striking. Along the Euphrates, groves of fruits and vegetables and acre after acre of date palms are surrounded by a lushness that paints the area a vivid green. Just a few miles from the Euphrates, however, the barren landscape turns brown. With the exception of an occasional Bedouin, the desert is essentially empty. Whether traveling by aircraft, vehicle, or on foot, the Anbar Governorate is vast. During a time when mining roads became a strategy of choice for insurgents, the need to patrol and travel throughout the province became one of the Marine Corps' greatest challenges. The threat of insurgent activity, when combined with the challenges that long-distance travel, choking dust, and stifling heat created, made the Anbar Province a difficult area of operation.

== Cities and towns ==
- Ramadi
- Fallujah
- Al-Qaim
- Hīt
- Haditha
- Anah
- Rawah
- Kabisa
- Al Baghdadi
- Falahat
- An Nukhayb
- Akashat
- Tarbil
- Husaibah Al Sharqiah
- Amiriyah Fallujah
- Saqlawiyah
- An Nahidayn
- Al Sharqiah
- Al Waleed (Al Walid)
- Sa'dah
- Al Saqrh
- Al Mamorha
- Al Enaimih
- Rumana
- Al Asarjirah
- Al Sujr
- Al Jabhah
- Al Rihaniah
- Al Furaat
- Al Mhamady
- Al Kasrah
- Al-Karābilah
- Al Ubaidi
- Barwanah
- Al Khaldiya
- Al Habbaniyah
- Al-Karmah
- Al Haqlaniyah
- Ar Rahaliyah
- Ar Rutbah

== See also ==
- Sunni Region
- Anbar campaign (2013–14)
- 2005 Al-Anbar governorate council election
- Abdul Sattar Abu Risha
- Anbar Awakening
- First Battle of Fallujah
- Operation Phantom Fury
- Battle of Ramadi
- Battle of Haditha
