= Husaybah =

Husaybah حصيبة
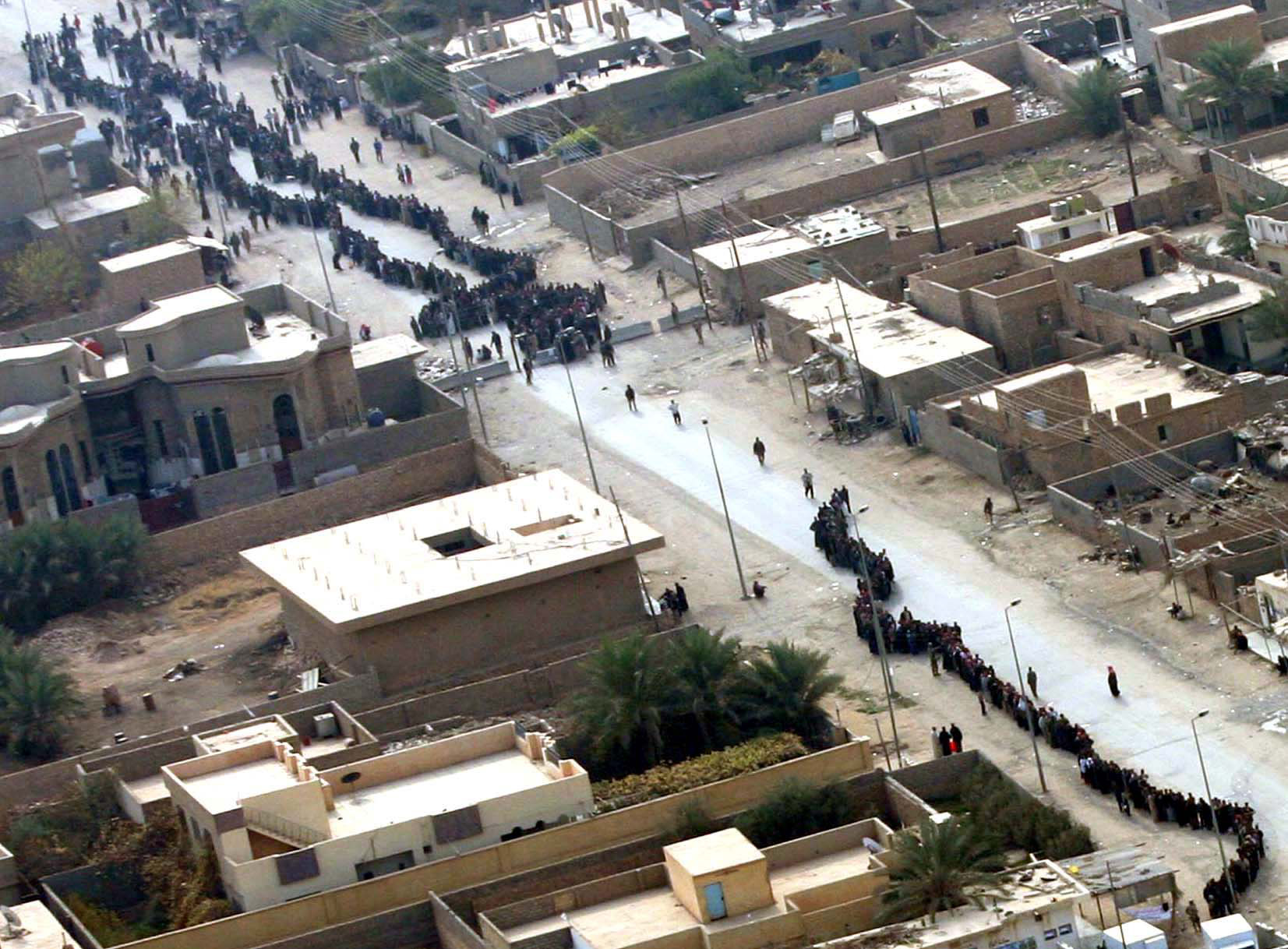

- Location within Iraq
- Coordinates: 34°23′34″N 40°59′13″E
- Country: Iraq
- Province: Al-Anbar
- District: Al-Qa'im
- Time zone: GMT+3

Husaybah (Arabic: حصيبة) is a city on the Euphrates river in the Al-Qa'im District of Al-Anbar province in Iraq, adjacent to the Al-Qa'im border crossing to Syria.

== Climate ==
In Husaybah, there is a desert climate. Most rain falls in the winter. The Köppen-Geiger climate classification is BWh. The average annual temperature in Husaybah is 20.3 °C (68.5 °F). About 113 mm (4.45 in) of precipitation falls annually.

Climate data for Husaybah
Month	Jan	Feb	Mar	Apr	May	Jun	Jul	Aug	Sep	Oct	Nov	Dec	Year
Mean daily maximum °C (°F)	13.9 (57.0)	16.8 (62.2)	21.2 (70.2)	26.7 (80.1)	32.7 (90.9)	38.1 (100.6)	40.5 (104.9)	40.5 (104.9)	36.4 (97.5)	30.3 (86.5)	22.1 (71.8)	15.7 (60.3)	27.9 (82.2)
Mean daily minimum °C (°F)	2.6 (36.7)	3.8 (38.8)	6.9 (44.4)	11.8 (53.2)	16.7 (62.1)	21.0 (69.8)	23.5 (74.3)	23.1 (73.6)	18.7 (65.7)	13.8 (56.8)	7.5 (45.5)	3.7 (38.7)	12.8 (55.0)
Average precipitation mm (inches)	24 (0.9)	15 (0.6)	14 (0.6)	18 (0.7)	7 (0.3)	0 (0)	0 (0)	0 (0)	0 (0)	6 (0.2)	9 (0.4)	20 (0.8)	113 (4.4)
Source: Climate-Data.org, Climate data

== See also ==
- Battle of Husaybah (2004)

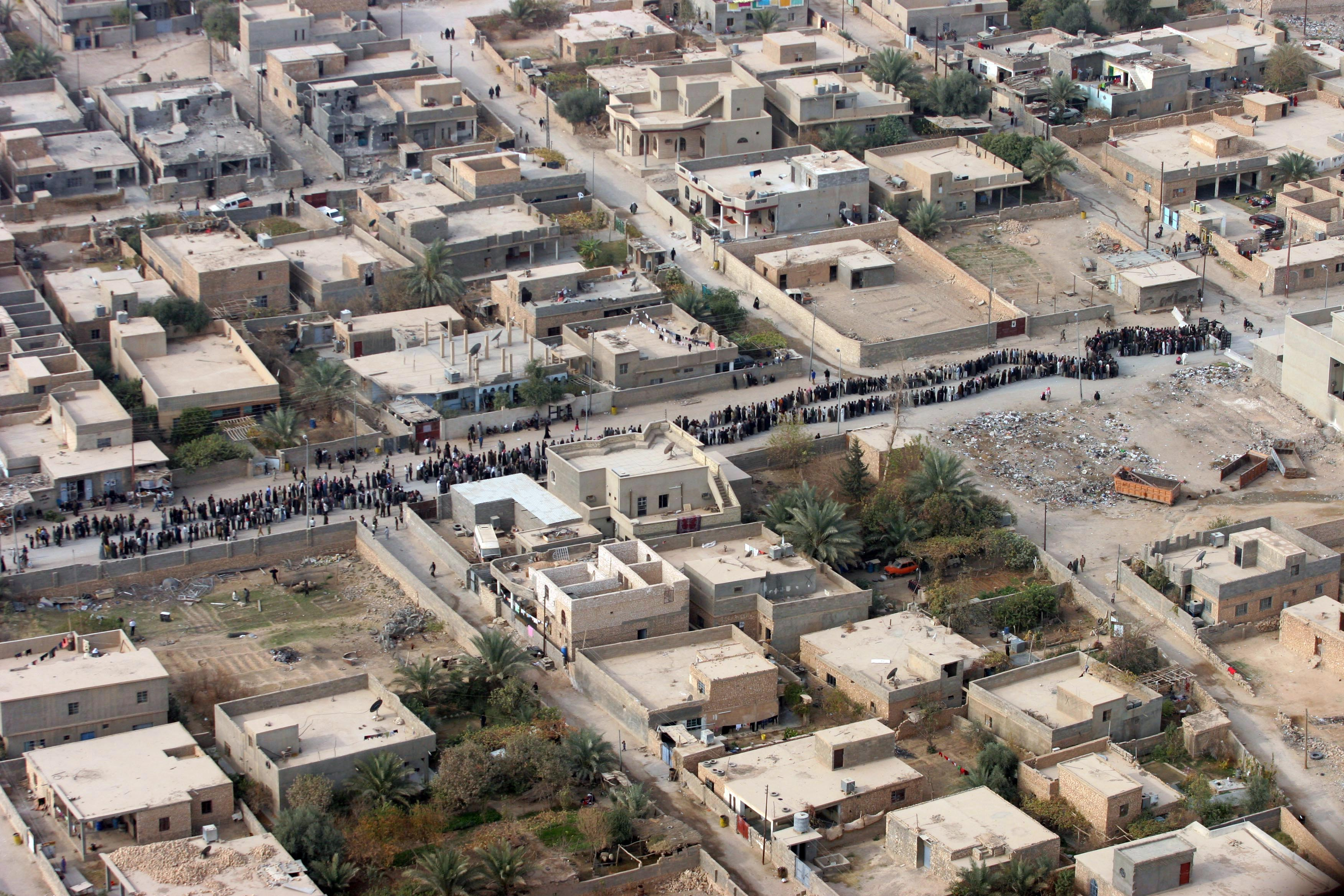
Iraqi citizens wait in line at a polling site in Husaybah, during Iraq's first parliamentary election in 2005 following US-led invasion.
