= Al-Karābilah =

Al-Karābilah ناحية الكرابلة
- Al-Karābilah town's location in Iraq
- Coordinates: 34°23′1″N 41°1′51″E
- Country: Iraq
- Governorate: Al Anbar
- District: Al-Qa'im

Population
  - Total: 13.000

Al-Karābilah (Arabic: ناحية الكرابلة) is a subdistrict in the west of the Al Anbar Governorate of Iraq, beside the Syrian border in an area of high ground. Its seat is the city of the Al-Karābilah. Agriculture is the main industry in the subdistrict.

== Al-Karābilah town ==
Al-Karābilah is an Iraqi border town and center of the Al-Karābilah subdistrict, located 5–7 km from Iraqi-Syrian borders. Its population is roughly 25,000 inhabitants, all of them Sunni Muslims arabs.

It is named Karabilah because it was founded by Sunni tribes exiled from the holy city of Karbala.

== Akkas gas field ==
Akkas gas field located in Al-Karabilah subdistrict. It was discovered in 1992, occupies approximately 30 km long and 12 km wide. Iraqi Oil Ministry estimated the reserves of Akkas at 5.6 trillion cubic feet. In 2011, the Iraqi government signed a contract with Kogas to develop the gas field. According to the signed contract with the Iraq government, Kogas hold 75% of the shares while the rest of the shares went to Midland Oil Company. All the development operations stopped due to terrorist attacks in 2014. Equipment, buildings, and other constructions have been looted or destroyed.

== Current situation ==
The subdistrict fell into IS's hands after intensive clashes between IS's troop on one side and Iraqi security forces backed by tribesmen on the other side. Al-Karābilah was liberated from IS by the Iraqi government forces on October 28, 2017.
