= Fallujah during the Iraq War =

American bombardment of Fallujah, Iraq

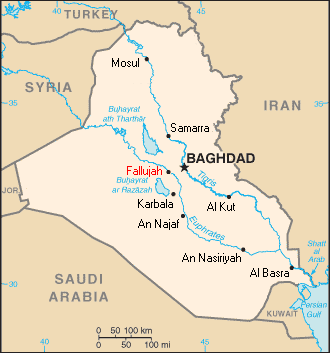
Map showing the location of Fallujah in Iraq

The United States bombardment of Fallujah began in April 2003, one month after the beginning of the invasion of Iraq. In April 2003 United States forces fired on a group of demonstrators who were protesting against the US presence. US forces alleged they were fired at first, whereas residents instead claimed that US forces fired indiscriminately at the crowd without provocation. 17 people were killed and 70 were wounded. In a later incident, US soldiers fired on protesters again; Fallujah's mayor, Taha Bedaiwi al-Alwani, said that two people were killed and 14 wounded. Iraqi insurgents were able to claim the city a year later, before they were ousted by a siege and two assaults by US forces. These events caused widespread destruction and a humanitarian crisis in the city and surrounding areas. As of 2004, the city was largely ruined, with 60% of buildings damaged or destroyed, and the population at 30%–50% of pre-war levels.

== 2003 invasion of Iraq ==
Although the majority of the residents were Sunni and had supported Saddam Hussein's rule, Fallujah lacked military presence just after his fall. There was little looting and the new mayor of the city—Taha Bidaywi Hamed, selected by local tribal leaders—was pro-United States. When the U.S. Army's 1st Battalion / 2nd Brigade 82nd Airborne entered the town on April 23, 2003, they positioned themselves at the vacated Ba'ath Party headquarters, a local school house, and the Ba'ath party resort just outside town (Dreamland)—the US bases inside the town erased some goodwill, especially when many in the city had been hoping the US Army would stay outside of the relatively calm city.

=== Instability, April 2003 – March 2004 ===
On the evening of April 28, 2003, several hundred residents defied the US curfew and marched down the streets of Fallujah, past the soldiers positioned in the former Ba'ath party headquarters, to protest the military presence inside the local school. US soldiers fired upon the crowd, killing as many as 17 and wounding more than 70 of the protesters. US soldiers alleged that they were returning fire, but protesters stated they were unarmed. Independent observers from a human rights group found no evidence that US forces had come under attack. The US suffered no casualties from the incident.

Two days later, on April 30, the 82nd Airborne was replaced in the city by Fox Troop from 2nd squadron of the / U.S. 3rd Armored Cavalry Regiment. The 3rd Cavalry was significantly smaller in number and chose not to occupy the same schoolhouse where the shooting had occurred two days earlier. On the same day soldiers shot three protesters in front of U.S. Forward Operating Base "Laurie," established in the former Ba'ath party headquarters, and next to the Mayor's office. At this point in time the 3rd Cavalry controlled all of Al Anbar province, and it became evident a larger force was needed. The now battalion-sized element of the 3rd Cavalry (2nd squadron) in Fallujah was replaced by the 2nd Brigade of the 3rd Infantry Division.

During the summer, the US Army decided to close down its last remaining base inside the city (the Ba'ath party headquarters; FOB Laurie). At this point the 3rd ACR had all of its forces stationed outside Fallujah in the former Baathist resort, Dreamland. After the May 11 disarmament of the Mujahedin-e-Khalq and subsequent protected persons assignment under the Fourth Geneva Convention, the incoming 3rd Infantry Division also began using the large MEK compound adjacent to Dreamland to accommodate its larger troop presence in Fallujah. Under its control, the 3rd Infantry Division maintained no bases inside the city of Fallujah.

On 30 June a "huge explosion" occurred in a mosque in which the imam, Sheikh Laith Khalil, and eight other people were killed. Residents of the city stated the army fired a missile at the mosque, while U.S. Colonel Joseph Disalvo stated that the explosion took place in a building adjacent to the mosque. Just a couple of days earlier things had been much quieter, although US troops had been confiscating motorbikes as a preventive measure against terrorist attacks.

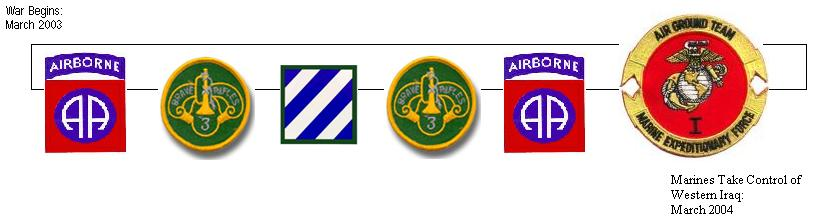
Timeline showing the sequence of units in control of Fallujah in just the first year of the war

Two months after the 3rd Infantry took control of Fallujah from the 3rd Cavalry, it was redeployed home. The 3rd Cavalry again assumed control of Fallujah with only one squadron. Attached to that Squadron was the 115th MP Company from the Rhode Island Army National Guard. The 115th MPs made routine patrols and frequent house raids searching for insurgents and weapons caches. In September 2003, the 3rd Brigade of the 82nd Airborne was deployed to replace the 3rd Cavalry in Ramadi and Fallujah. The 3rd Cavalry was then left to control all of the al-Anbar province except for these two cities.

Approximately one year after the invasion, the city's Iraqi police and Iraqi Civil Defense Corps were unable to establish order. Insurgents launched many attacks, some on police stations in the city, killing at least 20 police officers. Beginning in early March 2004, the Army's 82nd Airborne Division commanded by Major-General Charles H. Swannack Jr. gave a transfer of authority of the al-Anbar province to the I Marine Expeditionary Force commanded by Lt. General Conway. The 3rd Cavalry and the 3rd Brigade of the 82nd Airborne were then sent home.

On 24 March 2004, within hours of taking over control from the 82nd Airborne, the US Marines were drawn into running gun battles with insurgents, the Marines found themselves using these firefights to test the strength of the insurgents in various neighbourhoods. On 27 March, a JSOC surveillance team in Fallujah was compromised and had to shoot its way out of trouble.

==== Attack on contractors ====
On March 31, 2004 - Iraqi insurgents from the Brigades of Martyr Ahmed Yassin in Fallujah ambushed a convoy containing four American private military contractors employed by Blackwater USA, who were at the time guarding a convoy carrying 'kitchen supplies' to a military base, for the catering company Eurest Support Services. Intelligence reports concluded that Ahmad Hashim Abd al-Isawi was the mastermind behind the attack.

The four contractors, Scott Helvenston, Jerko Zovko, Wesley Batalona and Michael Teague, were dragged from their cars, beaten, and set ablaze. Their burned corpses were then dragged through the streets before being hung over a bridge crossing the Euphrates.

=== Siege, April 2004 ===
In response to the killing of the four US citizens, and intense political pressure, the US Marines commenced Operation Vigilant Resolve. They surrounded the city and attempted to capture the individuals responsible as well as others in the region who might have been involved in insurgencies. One out of every two mosques in Fallujah were used to hide fighters or weapons. The Iraqi National Guard was supposed to work alongside the US Marines in the operation, but on the dawn of the invasion they discarded their uniforms and deserted. Under pressure from the Iraqi Governing Council, the US aborted its attempt to regain control of Fallujah. The US Marines suffered 40 deaths in the siege. Estimates of the number of Iraqi deaths (both fighters and civilians) in the attack range from 271 (according to Iraqi Ministry of Health officials) to 731 (according to Rafie al-Issawi, the head of the local hospital).

The occupying force on April 9 allowed more than 70,000 women, children and elderly residents to leave the besieged city. On April 10, the US military declared a unilateral truce to allow for humanitarian supplies to enter Fallujah. US troops pulled back to the outskirts of the city. An Iraqi mediation team entered the city in an attempt to set up negotiations between US forces and local leaders, but as of April 12 had not been successful. At least one US battalion had orders to shoot any male of military age on the streets after dark, armed or not. In violation of the Geneva Convention, the city's main hospital was closed by Marines, negating its use, and a US sniper was placed on top of the hospital's water tower.

The ceasefire followed a wave of insurgency activity across southern Iraq, which included the capture of two US soldiers, seven employees of US military contractor Kellogg, Brown and Root, and more than 50 other workers in Iraq. Several of the prisoners were released within days of their capture, while the majority were executed.

The US forces ostensibly sought to negotiate a settlement but promised to restart its offensive to retake the city if one was not reached. Military commanders said their goal in the siege was to capture those responsible for the numerous deaths of US and Iraqi security personnel. As the siege continued, insurgents conducted hit-and-run attacks on US Marine positions. The Marines had announced a unilateral ceasefire.

=== Truce, May 2004 ===
At the beginning of May 2004, the US Marine Corps announced a ceasefire due to intense political pressure. Most of the fighting was limited to the southern industrial district, which had the lowest population density inside the city limits and the northwest corner of the city in the Jolan district. There were also Marine battalions in the northeast and southern portion of the city. While both sides began preparations to resume offensives, General Conway took a risk and handed control of the city to a former Iraqi general with roughly 1,000 men who then formed the Fallujah Brigade, while acknowledging that many of the people under control of the general were probably insurgents themselves (no verification was provided). The general, Major General Muhammed Latif, replaced a US choice, Jasim Mohammed Saleh, who was alleged to have been involved in the earlier atrocities against Kurds during the Iran–Iraq War. The ceasefire terms were to give control of Fallujah to General Latif on condition that Fallujah becomes a secure region for coalition forces and halt incoming mortar and rocket attacks on the nearby US bases. Latif's militia wore Iraqi military uniforms from the Hussein era. Another tenet of the cease-fire was the establishment of a Traffic Control Point (TCP) on the eastern side of the city just west of the "cloverleaf". This TCP was constantly manned by a platoon of Marines and a platoon from the Iraqi National Guard and saw almost daily firefights for the rest of the summer.

Celebratory banners appeared around the city, and the fighters paraded through the town on trucks. Iraqi governing council member Ahmed Chalabi, after a bombing that killed fellow IGC member Izzadine Saleem, blamed the US military's decisions in Fallujah for the attack, stating "The garage is open and car bombs are coming repeatedly."

Owners of shops that sold US-style magazine and barbers who offered "Western-style" haircuts were beaten and publicly humiliated. Inter-faction fighting was also rampant. The Fallujah Brigade was soon marginalized and ceased to be more than another faction in what had effectively become a no-go area for coalition troops.

=== Counter-insurgency, May – November 2004 ===
Throughout the summer and fall of 2004, the U.S. military conducted sporadic airstrikes on Fallujah. U.S. forces reported that all were confirmed targeted, intelligence-based strikes against houses used by the group of Abu Musab al-Zarqawi, an insurgency leader linked to al-Qaeda.

In October and early November 2004, the U.S. military prepared for a major offensive against the rebel stronghold with stepped up daily aerial attacks using precision-guided munitions against militant "safe houses," restaurants and meeting places in the city. U.S. Marines also engaged in firefights on a daily and nightly basis along the perimeter of the city. There were again conflicting reports of civilian casualties.

CNN incorrectly reported on October 14, 2004, that the US offensive assault on Fallujah had begun and broadcast a report from a young Marine outside Fallujah, 1st Lt. Lyle Gilbert, who announced that "troops have crossed the line of departure." Hours later, CNN reported their Pentagon reporters had determined that the assault had not, in fact, begun. The Los Angeles Times reported on December 1, 2004, that, according to several unnamed Pentagon officials, the Marine's announcement was a feint—part of an elaborate "psychological operation" (PSYOP) to determine the Fallujah rebels' reactions if they believed attack was imminent.

On November 7, 2004, the U.S.-appointed Iraq interim government declared a 60-day state of emergency in preparation for the assault, as insurgents carried out several car bomb attacks in the Fallujah area which killed Iraqi army and police, U.S. Marines and Iraqi civilians. The next day Prime Minister Iyad Allawi publicly authorized an offensive in Fallujah and Ramadi to "liberate the people" and "clean Fallujah from the terrorists". Marines, U.S. Army soldiers and allied Iraqi soldiers stormed into Fallujah's western outskirts, secured two bridges across the Euphrates, seized a hospital on the outskirts of the city and arrested about 50 men in the hospital. About half the arrested men were later released. A hospital doctor reported that 15 Iraqis were killed and 20 wounded during the overnight incursions. The US armed forces have designated the offensive as Operation Phantom Fury.

In the first week of Operation Phantom Fury, government spokesman Thair al-Naqeeb said that many of the remaining fighters have asked to surrender and that Iraqi authorities "will extend amnesty" to those who have not committed major crimes. At the same time, US forces prevented male refugees from leaving the combat zone, and the city was placed under a strict night-time shoot-to-kill curfew with anyone spotted in the Marines' night vision sights shot.

== U.S.–Iraqi offensive of November 7, 2004 ==
Journalists embedded with U.S. military units, although limited in what they may report, have reported the following:

- On November 8, 2004, a force of around 2,000 U.S. and 600 Iraqi troops began a concentrated assault on Fallujah with air strikes, artillery, armor, and infantry. The New York Times reported that within an hour of the start of the ground attack, troops seized the Fallujah General Hospital. "Patients and hospital employees were rushed out of rooms by armed soldiers and ordered to sit or lie on the floor while troops tied their hands behind their backs". Noam Chomsky in his book Failed States commented that according to the Geneva Conventions, medical establishments "may in no circumstance be attacked, but shall at all times be respected and protected by the Parties to the conflict." Troops seized the rail yards North of the city, and pushed into the city simultaneously from the North and West taking control of the volatile Jolan and Askari districts. By nightfall on November 9, 2004, the U.S. troops had almost reached the heart of the city. U.S. military officials stated that 1,000 to 6,000 insurgents were believed to be in the city, they appear to be organized, and fought in small groups, of three to 25. Many insurgents were believed to have slipped away amid widespread reports that the U.S. offensive was coming. During the assault, Marines and Iraqi soldiers endured sniper fire and destroyed booby traps, much more than anticipated. Ten U.S. troops were killed in the fighting and 22 wounded in the first two days of fighting. Insurgent casualty numbers were estimated at 85 to 90 killed or wounded. Several more days of fighting were anticipated as U.S. and Iraqi troops conducted house-to-house searches for weapons, booby traps, and insurgents.
- On 9 November, CNN Correspondent Karl Penhaul reported the use of cluster bombs in the offensive: "The sky over Fallujah seems to explode as U.S. Marines launch their much-trumpeted ground assault. War planes drop cluster bombs on insurgent positions and artillery batteries fire smoke rounds to conceal a Marine advance."
- November 10, 2004 reports by The Washington Post suggested U.S. armed forces used white phosphorus grenades and/or artillery shells, creating walls of fire in the city. Doctors working inside Fallujah report seeing melted corpses of suspected insurgents. The use of WP ammunition was confirmed from various independent sources, including U.S. troops who had suffered WP burns due to friendly fire. On November 16, 2005, The Independent reported that Pentagon spokesman Lieutenant Colonel Barry Venable "disclosed that (white phosphorus) had been used to dislodge enemy fighters from entrenched positions in the city"..."We use them primarily as obscurants, for smokescreens or target marking in some cases. However, it is an incendiary weapon and may be used against enemy combatants." But a day before, Robert Tuttle, the U.S. ambassador to London, denied that white phosphorus was deployed as a weapon: "US forces do not use napalm or white phosphorus as weapons."
- On November 13, 2004, a Red Crescent convoy containing humanitarian aid was delayed from entering Fallujah by the U.S. army.
- On November 13, 2004, a U.S. Marine with 3rd Battalion, 1st Marines was videotaped killing a wounded combatant in a mosque. The incident, which came under investigation, created controversy throughout the world. The man was shot at close range after he and several other wounded insurgents had previously been left behind overnight in the mosque by the U.S. Marines. The Marine shooting the man had been mildly injured by insurgents in the same mosque the day before.

In May 2005, it was announced that the Marine would not face a court-martial. In a statement, Maj. Gen. Richard F. Natonski, commanding general of the I Marine Expeditionary Force, said that a review of the evidence had shown that the shooting was "consistent with the established rules of engagement and the law of armed conflict."

- On November 16, 2004, a Red Cross official told Inter Press Service that "at least 800 civilians" had been killed in Fallujah and indicated that "they had received several reports from refugees that the military had dropped cluster bombs in Fallujah, and used a phosphorus weapon that caused severe burns."
- As of November 18, 2004, the U.S. military reported 1,200 insurgents killed and 1,000 captured. U.S. casualties were 51 killed and 425 wounded, and the Iraqi forces were 8 killed and 43 wounded.
- On December 2, 2004, the U.S. death toll in Fallujah operation reached 71 killed.
- Some of the tactics said to be used by the insurgents included playing dead and attacking, surrendering and attacking, and rigging dead or wounded with bombs. In the November 13th incident mentioned above, the U.S. Marine alleged the insurgent was playing dead.
- Of the 100 mosques in the city, about 60 were used as fighting positions by the insurgents. The U.S. and Iraqi military swept through all mosques used as fighting positions, destroying them, leading to great resentment from local residents.
- In 2005, the U.S. military admitted that it used white phosphorus as an anti-personnel weapon in Fallujah.

On 17 May 2011, AFP reported that 21 bodies, in black body-bags marked with letters and numbers in Roman script had been recovered from a mass grave in al-Maadhidi cemetery in the centre of the city. Fallujah police chief Brigadier General Mahmud al-Essawi said that they had been blindfolded, their legs had been tied and they had suffered gunshot wounds. The Mayor, Adnan Husseini said that the manner of their killing, as well as the body bags, indicated that US forces had been responsible. Both al-Essawi and Husseini agreed that the dead had been killed in 2004. The US Military declined to comment.

== Aftermath ==
Residents were allowed to return to the city in mid-December after undergoing biometric identification, provided they carried their ID cards at all times. US officials report that "more than half of Fallujah's 39,000 homes were damaged, and about 10,000 of those were destroyed." Compensation amounts to 20 percent of the value of damaged houses, with an estimated 32,000 homeowners eligible, according to Marine Lt. Col. William Brown. According to the NBC, 9,000 homes were destroyed, thousands more were damaged and of the 32,000 compensation claims only 2,500 had been paid as of April 14, 2005. According to Mike Marqusee of Iraq Occupation Focus writing in The Guardian, "Falluja's compensation commissioner has reported that 36,000 of the city's 50,000 homes were destroyed, along with 60 schools and 65 mosques and shrines". Reconstruction is only progressing slowly and mainly consists of clearing rubble from heavily damaged areas and reestablishing basic utility services. This is also due to the fact that only 10% of the pre-offensive inhabitants had returned as of mid-January, and only 30% as of the end of March 2005.

=== Health effects ===
Research by Chris Busby, Malak Hamdan and Entesar Ariabi published in 2010 lent credibility to anecdotal news reports of increases in birth defects and cancer after the fighting in 2004. Results from a survey of 711 households in Fallujah on cancer, birth defects and infant mortality suggested that large increases in cancer and infant mortality had occurred. Responses to the questionnaire also suggested an anomalous mean birth sex ratio in children born a year after the fighting, indicating that environmental contamination occurred in 2004. Although the authors said the use of depleted uranium as a possible source of relevant exposure, they emphasized that there could be other possibilities and that their results did not identify the agent(s) responsible for the increased levels of illness.

== ISIS occupation ==
In early January 2014, Iraq's Fallujah had "fallen completely" out of the Iraqi government's control. The center of the city was reportedly in control of fighters from the Islamic State in Iraq and Syria. While some families were fleeing Fallujah, others waited for ISIS to take over Ramadi. Despite reports stating ISIS was behind the unrest, The Christian Science Monitor journalist Dan Murphy disputed this allegation and claimed that while ISIS fighters have maintained a presence in the city, various tribal militias who sympathized with the ideas of nationalism and were opposed to both the Iraqi government and ISIS controlled the largest share of area in Fallujah. On January 14, tribal chieftains in the province acknowledged "revolutionary tribesmen" were behind the uprising in Fallujah and other parts of Anbar and announced they would support them unless Maliki agreed to cease the ongoing military crackdowns on tribesmen. In June 2016, Fallujah was retaken by Iraqi forces after a 3 month long siege.

== See also ==
- Human rights in post-Saddam Hussein Iraq
- Mark 77 bomb, also controversial in its usage in Fallujah by US forces
- White phosphorus use in Iraq
- Iraqi insurgency
- Battle of Fallujah (2016)
- Ramadi under U.S. military occupation

=== U.S. operations in Fallujah ===
United States Army led operations in Fallujah

- Operation Spartan Scorpion June 15–16, 2003
- Operation Market Sweep January 13, 2004

U.S. Marine led operations in Fallujah

- Operation Vigilant Resolve April 04–April 09, 2004
- Operation Phantom Fury November 07–December 23, 2004

=== Films ===
- American Sniper, is a 2014 American biographical war drama film directed by Clint Eastwood and written by Jason Hall.
- Fallujah, The Hidden Massacre, a documentary detailing the alleged use of white phosphorus and Mk-77 by the U.S. Army against civilians in the city. (Google Video)
- No True Glory, a Frontline Account of the Battle for Fallujah based on the book by Bing West scheduled for release in 2008, starring Harrison Ford as General Mattis. As of February 2010, the IMDb has no trace of this film project.
- Occupation: Dreamland Documentary film (2005)
- Delta Farce Comedy (2007) about Army reservists deployed to Fallujah, but who are accidentally airdropped elsewhere.
- Falluja, April 2004, a documentary film by Toshikuni Doi
- "Inside the Resistance", a documentary film by Tara Sutton
- "Fallujah Forensics", a documentary film by Tara Sutton
