= First Battle of Fallujah =

Operation of the Iraq War

Coordinates: 33°21′N 43°47′E

- Part of the Iraq War and the war on terror
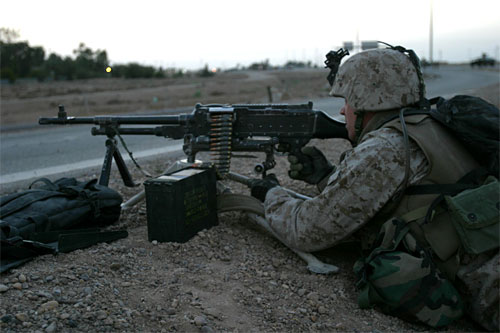
- A U.S. Marine from the 1st Marine Division mans an M240G machine gun outside the Fallujah city limits in April 2004.
Date	4 April – 1 May 2004 (3 weeks and 6 days)
Location	Fallujah, Iraq
Result	Insurgent victory

Belligerents
United States	Jama'at al-Tawhid wal-Jihad; Islamic Army in Iraq

Commanders and leaders
(United States) James T. Conway (United States) James Mattis (United States) John A. Toolan	Abu Musab al-Zarqawi; Abu Anas al-Shami; Abu Ayyub al-Masri; Ishmael Jubouri

Units involved
I Marine Expeditionary Force; 82nd Airborne Division; 101st Airborne Division; 3rd Cavalry Regiment; 10th Mountain Division; 1st Infantry Division; 5th Special Forces Group; Delta Force; Blackwater USA	Islamic Army in Iraq; Jama'at al-Tawhid wal-Jihad

Strength
10,000+	500–6,000

Casualties and losses
39+ killed 90 wounded	184–228 killed (Iraq Body Count)
- 572–616 civilians killed (Iraq Body Count)

The First Battle of Fallujah, code-named Operation Vigilant Resolve, was an American-led operation of the Iraq War against militants in Fallujah as well as an attempt to apprehend or kill the perpetrators of the killing of four U.S. contractors in March 2004.

The chief catalyst for the operation was the highly publicized killing and mutilation of four Blackwater USA private military contractors, and the killings of five American soldiers in Habbaniyah a few days earlier.

The battle, and especially the images of Iraqi civilians killed or injured in the fighting, caused many Iraqis to become resentful of the US presence. Western journalists found that even some Iraqis who previously supported the US invasion, and welcomed American state-building efforts, became increasingly alienated and skeptical of such promises.

== Background ==
Fallujah had generally benefited economically under Saddam Hussein, and many residents were employed as military and intelligence officers by his administration. The city was one of the most religious and culturally traditional areas in Iraq.

Following the collapse of the Ba'ath infrastructure in early 2003, local residents had elected a town council led by Taha Bidaywi Hamed, who kept the city from falling into the control of looters and common criminals. The town council and Hamed were both considered to be nominally pro-American, and their election originally meant that the United States had decided that the city was unlikely to become a hotbed of activity, and didn't require any immediate troop presence. This led to the United States committing few troops to Fallujah from the start.

Although Fallujah had seen sporadic air strikes by American forces, public opposition was not galvanized until 700 members of the 82nd Airborne Division first entered the city on 23 April 2003, and approximately 150 members of Charlie Company occupied al-Qa'id primary. On 28 April, a crowd of approximately 200 people gathered outside the school past curfew, demanding that the Americans vacate the building and allow it to re-open as a school. The protesters became increasingly heated, and the deployment of smoke gas canisters failed to disperse the crowd. The protest escalated as gunmen reportedly fired upon U.S. forces from the protesting crowd and U.S. Army soldiers from the 1st Battalion of the 325th Airborne Infantry Regiment of the 82nd Airborne Division returned fire, killing 17 people and wounding more than 70 of the protesters. There were no U.S. Army or coalition casualties in the incident. U.S. forces said that the shooting took place over 30–60 seconds; however, other sources claim the shooting continued for half an hour.

Two days later, a protest at the former Ba'ath party headquarters decrying the American shootings was also fired upon by U.S. forces, this time the U.S. 3rd Armored Cavalry Regiment, which resulted in three more deaths. Following both incidents, coalition forces asserted that they had not fired upon the protesters until they were fired upon first.

The 82nd Airborne soldiers were replaced by soldiers from the 3rd Armored Cavalry Regiment and 2/502nd Regiment, 101st Airborne Division. On 4 June, members of B Company ("Renegades"), 2/502nd, came under attack after a presence patrol on foot. An RPG round struck the lead vehicle as these soldiers mounted vehicles to return to base; PFC Brandon Oberleitner was killed and six were injured. Oberleitner's death was the only loss of life for B. Co. during the deployment. Soon after this attack, the 3rd Armored Cavalry requested an additional 1,500 troops, to counter growing resistance in Fallujah and nearby Habbaniyah.

In June, American forces began confiscating motorcycles from local residents, claiming that they were being used in hit-and-run attacks on coalition forces.

On 30 June, a large explosion occurred in a mosque in which the imam, Sheikh Laith Khalil and eight other people were killed. While the local population claimed that Americans had fired a missile at the mosque, U.S. forces claimed that it was an accidental detonation by insurgents constructing bombs.

On 12 February 2004, insurgents attacked a convoy carrying General John Abizaid, commander of U.S. forces in the Middle East, and the 82nd Airborne's Major General Charles Swannack, firing on the vehicles from nearby rooftops with RPGs, after seemingly infiltrating the Iraqi security forces.

Eleven days later, insurgents diverted Iraqi police to a false emergency on the outskirts of the city, before simultaneously attacking three police stations, the mayor's office and a civil defence base. At least 17 police officers were killed, and as many as 87 prisoners released.

During this time, the 82nd Airborne was conducting regular "lightning raids" inside the city, where Humvee convoys would destroy road barriers and curbs that could hide IEDs, and oversee searches of homes and schools, which frequently saw property damage, and led to shoot-outs with local residents.

In March 2004, Swannack transferred authority of the Al-Anbar province to the I Marine Expeditionary Force commanded by Lt. General Conway.

By early March 2004, the city began to fall under the increasing influence of guerrilla factions. The rising violence against the American presence resulted in the complete withdrawal of troops from the city, with only occasional incursions trying to gain and reinforce a "foothold in the city" being attempted. This was coupled with one or two patrols around the outer limits of FOB Volturno, the former site of Qusay and Uday Hussein's palace.

On 27 March, a JSOC surveillance team was compromised in the town and had to shoot its way out of trouble.

On the morning of 31 March, a combat engineer team from the 1st Engineer Battalion/1st Infantry Division was sent out on a route clearance mission in support of the 82nd Airborne and Blackwater movements. While en route from Habbaniyah to Fallujah, they were hit with the largest roadside bomb used at that point in the war, resulting in the deaths of 5 Bravo Company soldiers.

== Blackwater deaths ==
On 31 March 2004, Iraqi insurgents in Fallujah ambushed a convoy containing four American private military contractors from Blackwater USA who were conducting delivery for food caterers ESS.

The four armed contractors, Scott Helvenston, Jerko Zovko, Wesley Batalona and Michael Teague, were killed by machine gun fire and a grenade thrown through a window of their SUVs. A mob then set their bodies ablaze, and their corpses were dragged through the streets before being hung over a bridge crossing the Euphrates. The insurgents provided images to news agencies for broadcast worldwide, causing a great deal of indignation and moral outrage in the United States. An announcement of an upcoming "pacification" of the city promptly followed.

The intended Marine Corps strategy of foot patrols, less aggressive raids, humanitarian aid, and close cooperation with local leaders was suspended on orders to mount a military operation to clear guerrillas from Fallujah.

Abu Musab al-Zarqawi was originally suspected as the organizer of the ambush as he was known to be planning attacks and believed to be in the area. The intelligence community was doubtful, however, because the exhibitionism of broadcasting images of the desecration of the victim's bodies was uncharacteristic of al-Zarqawi, whose typical style was to leak to Al Jazeera that he had planned an attack some weeks after it occurred. Intelligence reports ultimately concluded that Ahmad Hashim Abd al-Isawi was the mastermind behind the attack. By September 2004, al-Zarqawi was the "highest priority" target in Fallujah for the United States military; he died in a targeted killing in June 2006 when a United States Air Force jet dropped two 500-pound (230 kg) guided bombs on the safehouse in which he was attending a meeting.

al-Isawi was also an important target, whose attacks continued until a 2009 SEAL special operation raid captured him without a shot being fired. He made accusations of mistreatment while in custody, and testified in April 2010 at the ensuing courts-martial against three Navy SEALs (all of whom were acquitted). Subsequently, he was handed over to Iraqi authorities, who tried and executed him by hanging at some point before November 2013.

== Campaign ==
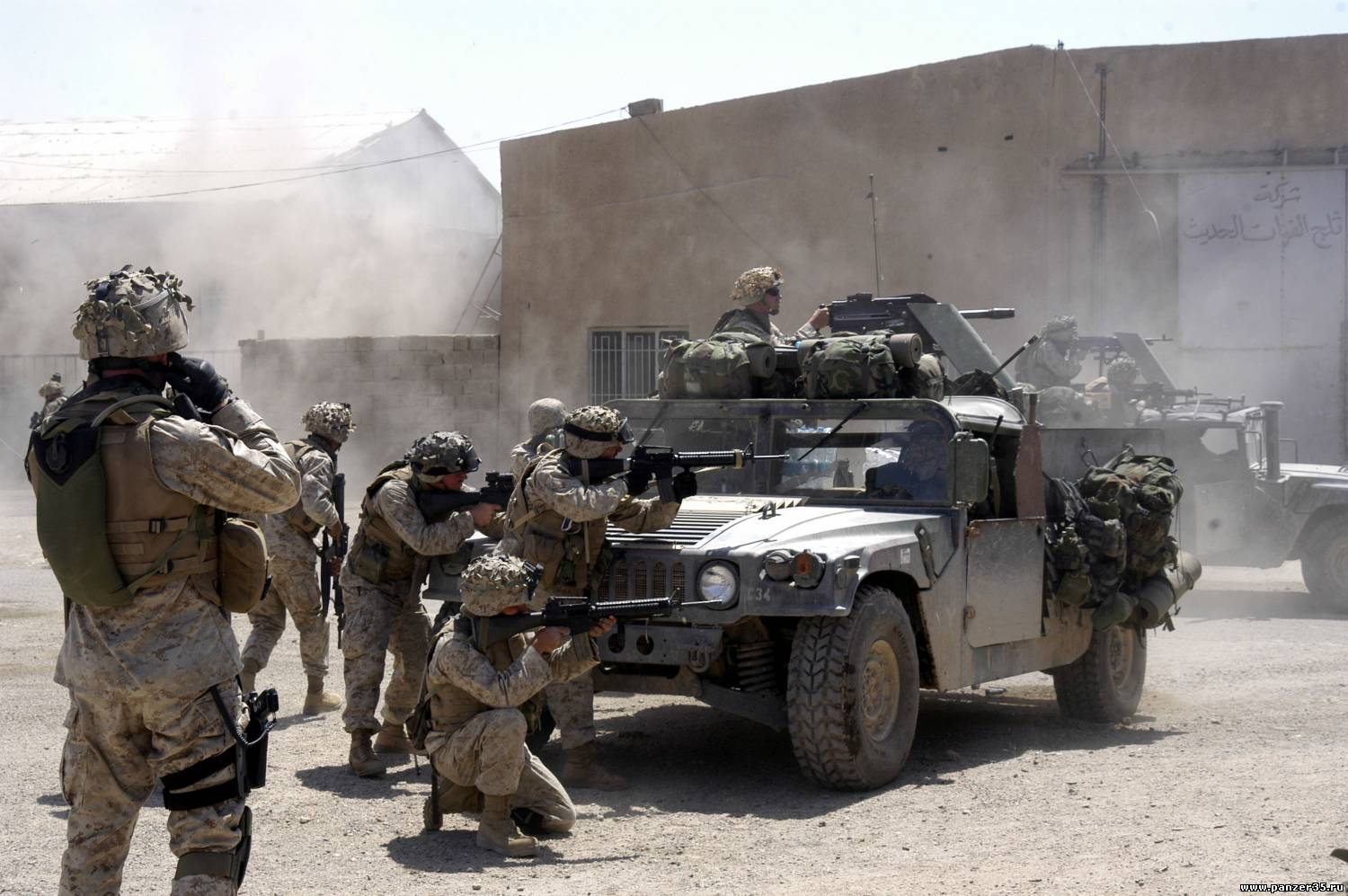
U.S. Marines from 1st Battalion, 5th Marines fire at insurgent positions during the First Battle of Fallujah.

On 1 April, Brigadier General Mark Kimmitt, deputy director of U.S. military operations in Iraq, promised an "overwhelming" response to the Blackwater USA deaths, stating "We will pacify that city."

On 3 April 2004, the 1st Marine Expeditionary Force received a written command from the Joint Task Force, ordering offensive operations against Fallujah. This order went against the wishes of the Marine Commanders on the ground who wanted to conduct surgical strikes and raids against those suspected of involvement in the Blackwater deaths.

On the night of 4 April 2004, American forces launched a major assault in an attempt to "re-establish security in Fallujah" by encircling it with around 2000 troops. At least four homes were hit in aerial strikes, and there was sporadic gunfire throughout the night.

By the morning of 5 April 2004, headed by the 1st Marine Expeditionary Force, American units had surrounded the city with an aim towards retaking it. American troops blockaded roads leading into the city with Humvees and concertina wire. They also took over a local radio station and handed out leaflets urging residents to remain inside their homes and help American forces identify insurgents and any Fallujans who were involved in the Blackwater deaths.

It was estimated that there were 12–24 separate "hardcore" groups of insurgents, armed with RPGs, machine guns, mortars and anti-aircraft weapons, some of it supplied by the Iraqi Police. By 6 April 2004, U.S. military sources said that "Marines may not attempt to control the center of the town".

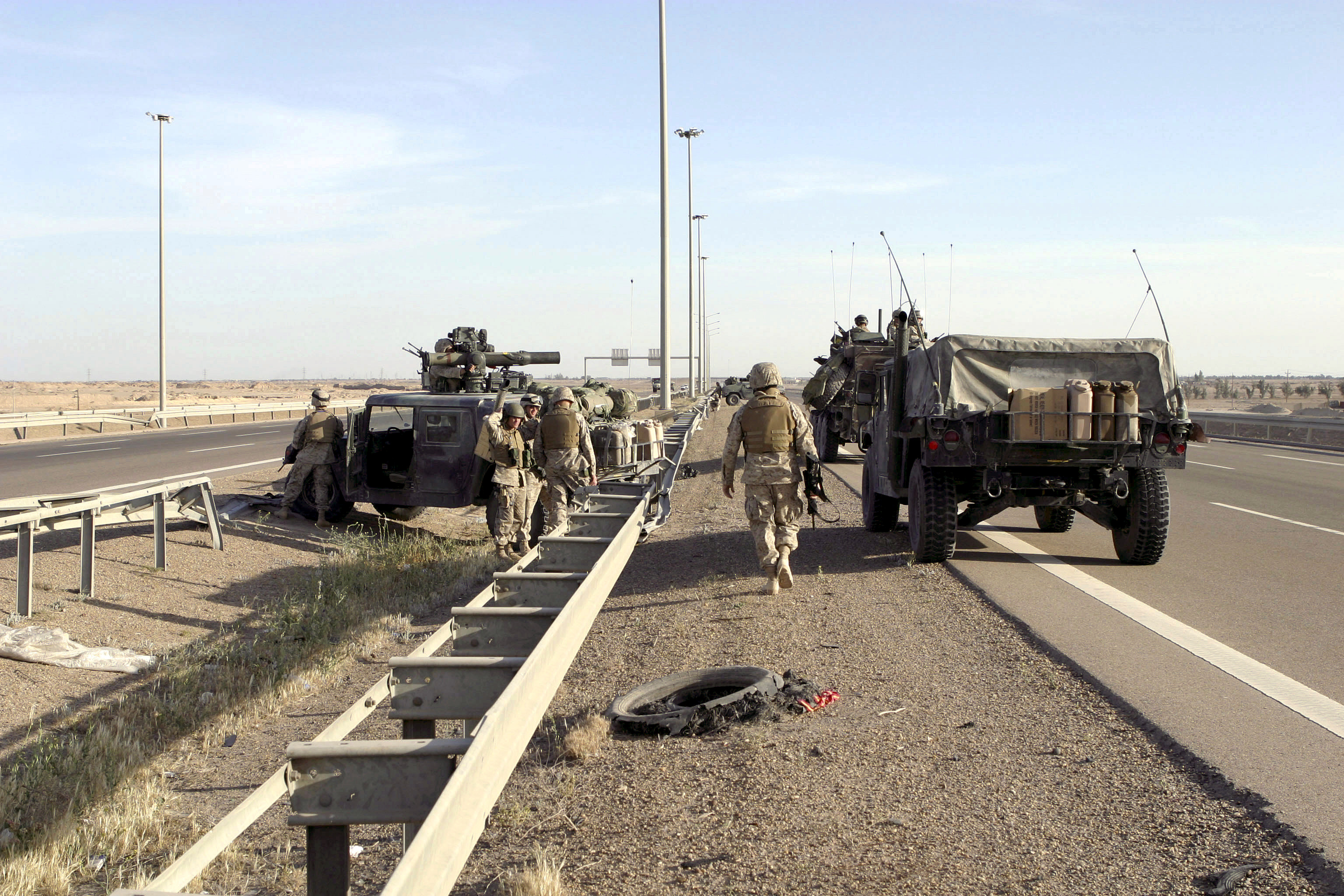
During the First Battle of Fallujah, U.S. Marines from 2nd Battalion, 1st Marines block off Fallujah's Highway 1.

In the opening days, it was reported that up to a third of the civilian population had fled the city.

The siege forced the closing of Fallujah's two main hospitals, Fallujah General Hospital and the Jordanian Hospital, which were re-opened during the ceasefire on 9 April 2004. Also on that date, the port visit to Jebel Ali by the aircraft carrier USS George Washington (CVN-73) was cancelled, and the George Washington carrier strike group and its embarked Carrier Air Wing Seven were ordered to remain on station in the Persian Gulf as fighting intensified between Coalition Forces and Iraqi insurgents around Fallujah.

The resulting engagements set off widespread fighting throughout Central Iraq and along the Lower Euphrates, with various elements of the Iraqi insurgency taking advantage of the situation and commencing simultaneous operations against the Coalition forces. This period marked the emergence of the Mahdi Army, the militia of Shiite cleric Muqtada al-Sadr, as a major armed faction which, at that time, actively participated in anti-Coalition operations. The happenings were also punctuated by a surge of a Sunni rebellion in the city of Ramadi. During this period, a number of foreigners were captured by insurgent groups. Some were killed outright, whilst others were held as hostages in an attempt to barter for political or military concessions. Some elements of the Iraqi police and Iraqi Civil Defense Corps also turned on the Coalition forces or simply abandoned their posts.

The rebels in Fallujah held on, as the Americans attempted to tighten their hold on the city. Air bombardments rained on insurgent positions throughout the city, Lockheed AC-130 gunships attacked targets with their Gatling guns and howitzers a number of times. Scout Snipers became a core element of the Marines' strategy, with reports claiming that some had killed up to 31 insurgents. Tactical Psychological Operations Detachment 910 conducted psychological warfare in support of Marine units during the battle, reportedly blaring Metallica over their loud speakers to weaken insurgents' morale.

Due to the fact that American attacks were taking a toll on civilians as well as Iraqi insurgents, coalition forces faced growing criticism from within the Iraqi Governing Council, where Adnan Pachachi said, "these operations by the Americans are unacceptable and illegal."

Al-Jazeera reporter Ahmed Mansur, and cameraman Laith Mushtaq, the only two non-embedded journalists covering the conflict since 3 April 2004, reported that an unknown source stated that United States insisted that the reporters be withdrawn from the city, as a pre-condition to the ceasefire.

At noon on 9 April 2004, under pressure from the Governing Council, Paul Bremer announced that the U.S. forces would be unilaterally holding a ceasefire, stating that they wanted to facilitate negotiations between the Iraqi Governing Council, insurgents, and city spokespersons, and to allow government supplies to be delivered to residents.

As a consequence, much-needed humanitarian relief which had been held up by the fighting and blockade finally managed to enter the city, notably a major convoy organized by private citizens, businessmen and clerics from Baghdad as a joint Shi'a-Sunni effort. Some U.S. forces used this time to occupy and scavenge abandoned houses and convert them into de facto bunkers, while a number of insurgents did the same.

At this point, it was estimated that 600 Iraqis had been killed, at least half of whom were non-combatants. Although hundreds of insurgents had been killed in the assault, the city remained firmly under their control. American forces had by then only managed to gain a foothold in the industrial district to the south of the city. The end of major operations for the time being led to negotiations between various Iraqi elements and the Coalition forces, punctuated by occasional firefights.

On 12 April 2004, two U.S. Marines (Robert Zurheide and Brad Shuder) along with an ally interpreter were killed in a friendly fire mortar mission at a schoolhouse in Fallujah.

On 13 April 2004, U.S. Marines fell under attack from insurgents located within a mosque. An airstrike destroyed the mosque, prompting a public outcry.

On 15 April 2004, an American F-16 Fighting Falcon dropped a 2,000-pound (910 kg) JDAM GPS guided bomb over the northern district of Fallujah.

On 19 April 2004, the ceasefire seemed to be consolidated with a plan to reintroduce joint US/Iraqi patrols in the city. Over time this arrangement broke down and the city remained a major center of opposition to the U.S.-appointed Iraqi Interim Government. Additionally, the composition of the armed groups in Fallujah changed during the following months, shifting from domination by secular, nationalist and ex-Ba'athist groups towards a marked influence of warlords with ties to organized crime and groups following a radical Wahhabi stance.

On 27 April 2004, insurgents attacked U.S. defensive positions, causing the Americans to call in air support. In response, on 28 April 2004, the aircraft carrier George Washington launched squadrons VFA-136, VFA-131, VF-11, and VF-143 to fly combat air sorties against insurgents in Fallujah. During this operation, aircraft from Carrier Air Wing Seven dropped 13 GBU-12 Paveway II laser-guided bombs on insurgent positions and also provided combat air support to the 1st Marine Expeditionary Force.

=== US withdrawal ===
On 1 May 2004, the United States withdrew from Fallujah, as Lieutenant General James Conway announced that he had unilaterally decided to turn over any remaining operations to the newly formed Fallujah Brigade - a Sunni security force formed by the CIA, which would be armed with U.S. weapons and equipment under the command of former Ba'athist Army General Jasim Mohammed Saleh. Several days later, when it became clear that Saleh had been involved in military actions against Shi'ites under Saddam Hussein, U.S. forces announced that Muhammed Latif would instead lead the brigade. Nevertheless, the group dissolved and had turned over all the supplied weapons to the insurgency by September. The Brigade soldiers declared loyalty to the insurgents and joined various jihadist and nationalist groups that vied for authority in the town.

The loss of the Fallujah Brigade prompted the Second Battle of Fallujah in November that year. After intense fighting, the Americans successfully occupied the city by the end of December.

During the interim period between the two battles, U.S. forces maintained a presence at Camp Baharia, a few miles outside the city limits.

== Legacy ==
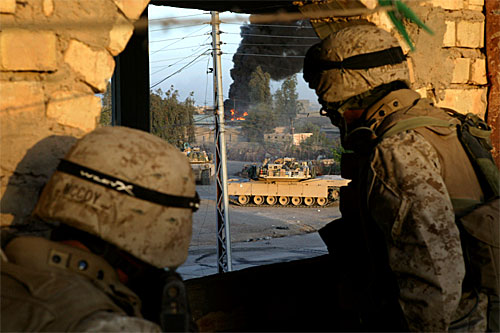
During the First Battle of Fallujah, U.S. Marines from the 1st Marine Regiment take cover as an M1A1 Abrams from the 1st Tank Battalion fires at a building where insurgent snipers are positioned.

The largest combat mission since the declaration of the end of "major hostilities", the First Battle of Fallujah marked a turning point in public perception of the ongoing conflict. This was because insurgents, rather than Saddam loyalists, were seen as the chief opponents of U.S. forces. It was also judged by both military and civilian agencies that reliance upon U.S.-funded regional militias, such as the failed Fallujah Brigade, could prove disastrous. Colonel John Spencer, a military analyst, exposed the lack of appropriate intelligence preparation and adequate gathering of forces and armoured assets to carry out an assault on a densely populated area. Spencer also pointed out the hasty political decision to conduct a show of force motivated by retaliatory intent, without taking into consideration the unfavorable environment. He wrote that "The First Battle of Fallujah was a loss for the US forces not because of fighting capability, but due to insufficient planning, force ratios, information operations, and ultimately political support for the operation."

The battle also pushed Abu Musab al-Zarqawi into the public spotlight as the best-known commander of anti-Coalition forces in Iraq, and brought public attention to the concept of a Sunni Triangle.

27 U.S. servicemen were killed during the battle in Fallujah. Iraq Body Count estimated that around 800 Iraqis died in the battle as well, of which 572–616 were civilians and 184–228 insurgents. Many of the Iraqis killed were buried inside the city's former football stadium, which became known as the Martyrs' Cemetery.

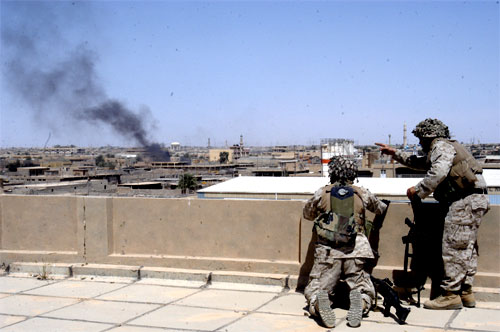
Marines with Company A, 1st Battalion, 5th Marine Regiment, peer over a building top to fix in enemy targets in Al Fallujah, Iraq April 7, 2004.

== Participating units ==
- 1st Marine Division
  - 1st Battalion 5th Marines
  - 2nd Battalion 1st Marines
  - 2nd Battalion 2nd Marines
  - 2nd Battalion 7th Marines
  - 3rd Battalion 7th Marines
  - 3rd Battalion 4th Marines
  - 3rd Battalion 24th Marines
  - 1st Tank Battalion
  - 1st Battalion 11th Marines (Alpha Battery)
  - Marine Wing Support Squadron 374
  - 1st Light Armored Reconnaissance Battalion (Alpha Company)
  - 1st Reconnaissance Battalion
  - 1st Force Reconnaissance Company
  - MCSOCOM Detachment One
  - 2nd Battalion 11th Marines (Echo Battery)
  - 1st Combat Engineer Battalion
  - 2nd Combat Engineer Battalion
  - Naval Mobile Construction Battalion-74
  - 3rd Assault Amphibian Battalion
  - A co. 112 Military Police Battalion 89th BDE. - made up by PA & RI National Guard (Operationally Controlled Under the 1st Marine Expeditionary Force)
  - 21st Military Police Company (Airborne)|21st Military Police Company (Operationally Controlled Under the 1st Marine Expeditionary Force)
  - 1st Intelligence Battalion
  - 1st Force Service Support Group
  - Combat Service Support Company 113
  - Combat Service Support Company 111
- 1st Infantry Division
  - 1st Battalion, 16th Infantry
- 5th Special Forces Group
- 1st Special Forces Operational Detachment-Delta
- Department Of Defense Security Forces, Tactical Response Team
- 101st Airborne Division
- 82nd Airborne Division
- 10th Mountain Division
- HMM-161
- HMLA-775
- HMLA-167
- VF-11
- VF-143
- VFA-136
- VFA-131
- HMM-764
- Combat Service Support Battalion 1
- 505th Iraqi Civil Defense Corps (ICDC)
- 36th Iraqi Commando Battalion, Iraqi Special Operations Brigade
- Iraqi Counter-Terrorism Forces Battalion
- 1st Battalion 11th Marines (Alpha Battery)
- Headquarters 10th Marines Counter Battery Radar/ Target Acquisition Platoon
- 555th Expeditionary Fighter Squadron
- 492nd Expeditionary Fighter Squadron

== See also ==
- Second Battle of Fallujah
- United States occupation of Fallujah
- 2004 in Iraq
- History of Iraqi insurgency
- Iraqi insurgency

== External resources ==
- "U.S. Launches 'Vigilant Resolve'", Associated Press, 5 April 2004. News article published at the start of the operation.
- Hardball with Chris Matthews, 7 April 2004. MSNBC transcript of a television report providing information on Operation Vigilant Resolve and the rest of the spring uprisings.
- "Private Warriors", PBS Frontline.
