= Merlin German =

United States Marine

- Born: November 15, 1985; New York City, New York, U.S.
- Died: April 11, 2008 (aged 22); Brooke Army Medical Center; San Antonio, Texas, U.S.
- Military career
- Allegiance: United States
- Branch: United States Marine Corps
- Service years: 2003–2007
- Rank: Sergeant
- Nickname: "Miracle Man"
- Units: 2nd Battalion, 11th Marines
- Conflicts: Iraq War (WIA)
- Awards: Purple Heart

Merlin German (November 15, 1985 – April 11, 2008) was a United States Marine sergeant stationed in Iraq who survived a roadside bomb blast in 2005. He became a symbol of recovery throughout the United States, soon known as the "Miracle Marine," during the 17 months he spent hospitalized following the blast. German eventually regained the ability to walk, and set up a charity for child burn victims. Just over three years after the blast, he died following a minor skin graft surgery.

== Early life and education ==
German was born in New York City's Manhattan, on November 15, 1985, to Hemery and Lourdes German, immigrants from the Dominican Republic. He grew up in Washington Heights with seven siblings: sisters Marcia and Lawren, and brothers Ariel, Freddie, Johnny, Alejandro and Julio. By the age of 11, he told one of his brothers, Ariel, that he wanted to be a Marine when he grew up. In 2001, he moved to Greenburgh, New York, to avoid moving to the Dominican Republic with his parents, and attended Woodlands High School for his junior and senior years. He moved in with one of his sisters, Lawren German, and her husband, his brother-in-law, Rafael Diaz, along with their three sons, his nephews, Ralph Junior, Matt, and Isaiah. In high school, he spent most days working out in the gym and joined a program where he'd run with Marines on weekends, trying to get in shape for boot camp.

== Career ==
German enlisted in the Marine Corps September 8, 2003. He graduated from 2nd battalion, Golf company follow series platoon 2106 on December 19, 2003, and received a meritorious promotion to Private First Class (PFC) upon graduation for being one of four squad leaders. In April 2004, he transferred to his first permanent duty station, 5th Battalion, 11th Marines, 1st Marine Division where he served as a Field Artillery Cannoneer. Shortly after he was assigned to his unit, he was sent to Machinegunner's Course. Among the Corporals and Sergeants, he was the only Private First Class to attend the course. He graduated second in his class. In September 2004, he deployed to Iraq in support of Operation Iraqi Freedom. German's parent unit was 2nd Battalion, 11th Marines from Marine Corps Base Camp Pendleton, California. German was medically retired on September 28, 2007, as a result of his injuries.

=== Iraq War and IED injury ===
In September 2004, German's unit was attached to 2nd Battalion, 11th Marines and became part of Weapons Platoon for convoy security. His unit was charged with safely transporting prisoners and cargo, and German participated in over 150 successful missions. German's Platoon Sergeant and Company Commander applauded him for his keen ability to spot improvised explosive devices (IEDs).

In the first six months of deployment, German found 8 IEDs without anyone sustaining injuries. On February 21, 2005, Sergeant German's squad was on a mission to recon an unknown route from Jordan to Baghdad. While en route to Camp Ramadi, German spotted an IED while standing in the turret at his Mk 19 grenade launcher. With no time to alert the driver, their Humvee was hit on a left side by a gas-fed shaped charge explosive. German was blown clear off the vehicle, and his fellow Marines helped extinguish the flames that had already burned 97% of his total body surface area.

==== Recovery ====
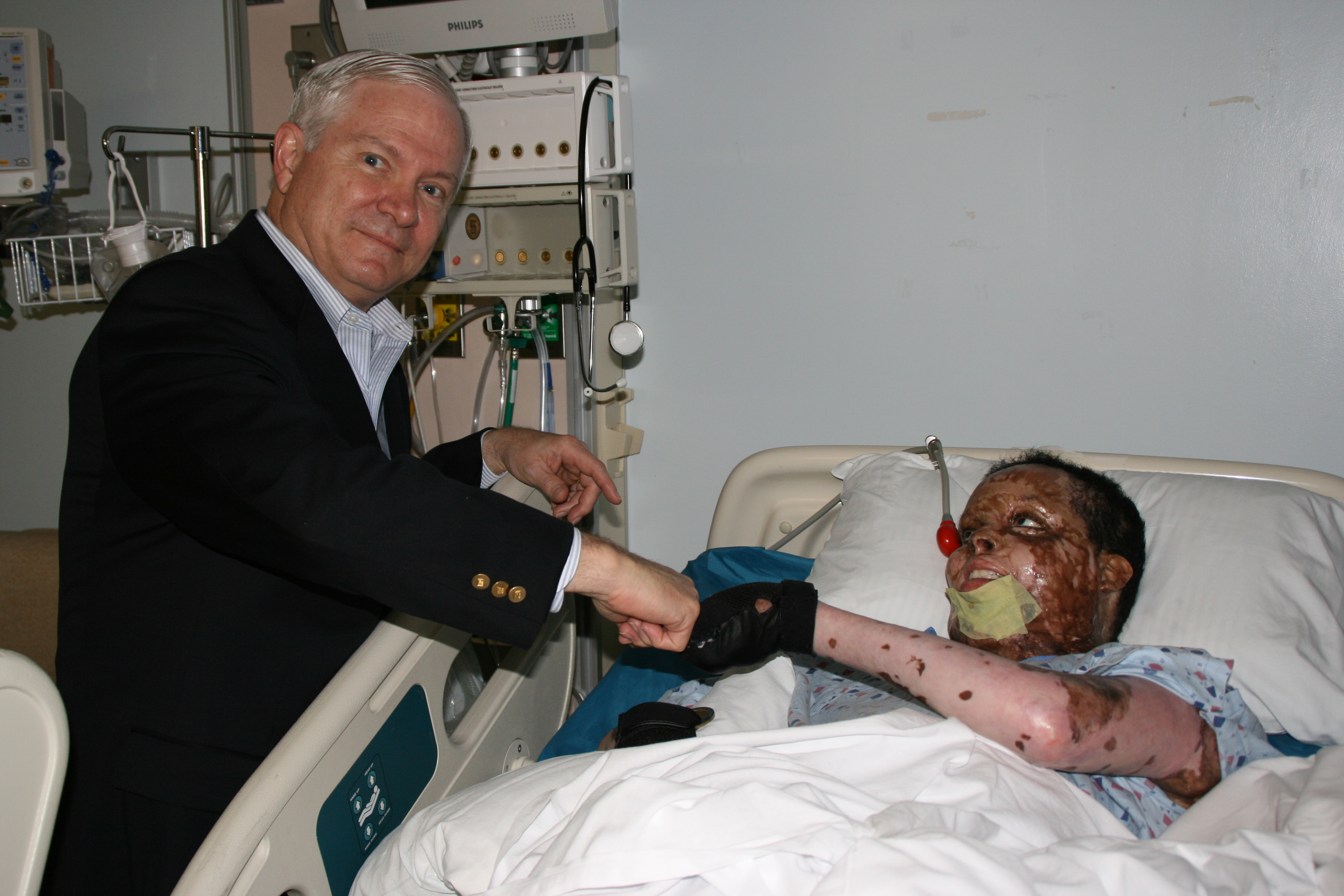
Defense Secretary Robert Gates visits Merlin German at Brooke Army Medical Center, 2007

German was transported to Landstuhl Regional Medical Center in Germany, where he was given a grim prognosis. He was transported again to the Brooke Army Medical Center, San Antonio on February 25, 2005, and stayed there as an inpatient for 17 months. He underwent surgeries during this time, gradually rebuilding his abilities.

== Later life ==
=== Life out of the hospital ===
After regaining his ability to walk, German purchased a home in San Antonio, Texas and founded the Merlin's Miracles charity organization, to help child burn victims.

== Death ==
On April 11, 2008, German died at the Brooke Army Medical Center after surgery to graft skin onto his lip. His memorial service was held on April 22, 2008. Sergeant German is buried in Florida National Cemetery.

The Wounded Warrior Regiment renamed its call-in help center in Marine Corps Base Quantico after German on December 4, 2008. The center is designed to help veterans receive care and other assistance.

== Bibliography ==
- Rivera, Laura (May 2, 2008). "Sgt. Merlin German, Marine burned in Iraq, dies". Newsday. Archived from the original on May 3, 2008.
- "'Miracle' Marine dies; badly burned in 2005 Iraq blast". Associated Press. May 2, 2008. Archived from the original on 2008-05-05.
- "Sgt. Merlin German, 1985-2008". New York Post. May 3, 2008.
