= Al Falluja Cemetery =

Al Falluja Cemetery may refer to:

- Martyrs' Cemetery
- Israeli razing of cemeteries and necroviolence against Palestinians
