= Al Falluja =

Al Fallujah, Al Falouja, Al Faluja, etc., with or without the definite article "Al"/"Al-" may mean:

- Fallujah, city in Iraq
  - Al-Falluja SC football club in Fallujah, Iraq
  - Al-Fallujah Stadium, football stadium in Fallujah, Iraq
- Al-Faluja, a depopulated village in Palestine near the present Kiryat Gat, Israel
- Al Falouja Cemetery in the Gaza Strip, west-central Palestine
