= United States Marine Corps Wounded Warrior Regiment =

Wounded Warrior Regiment
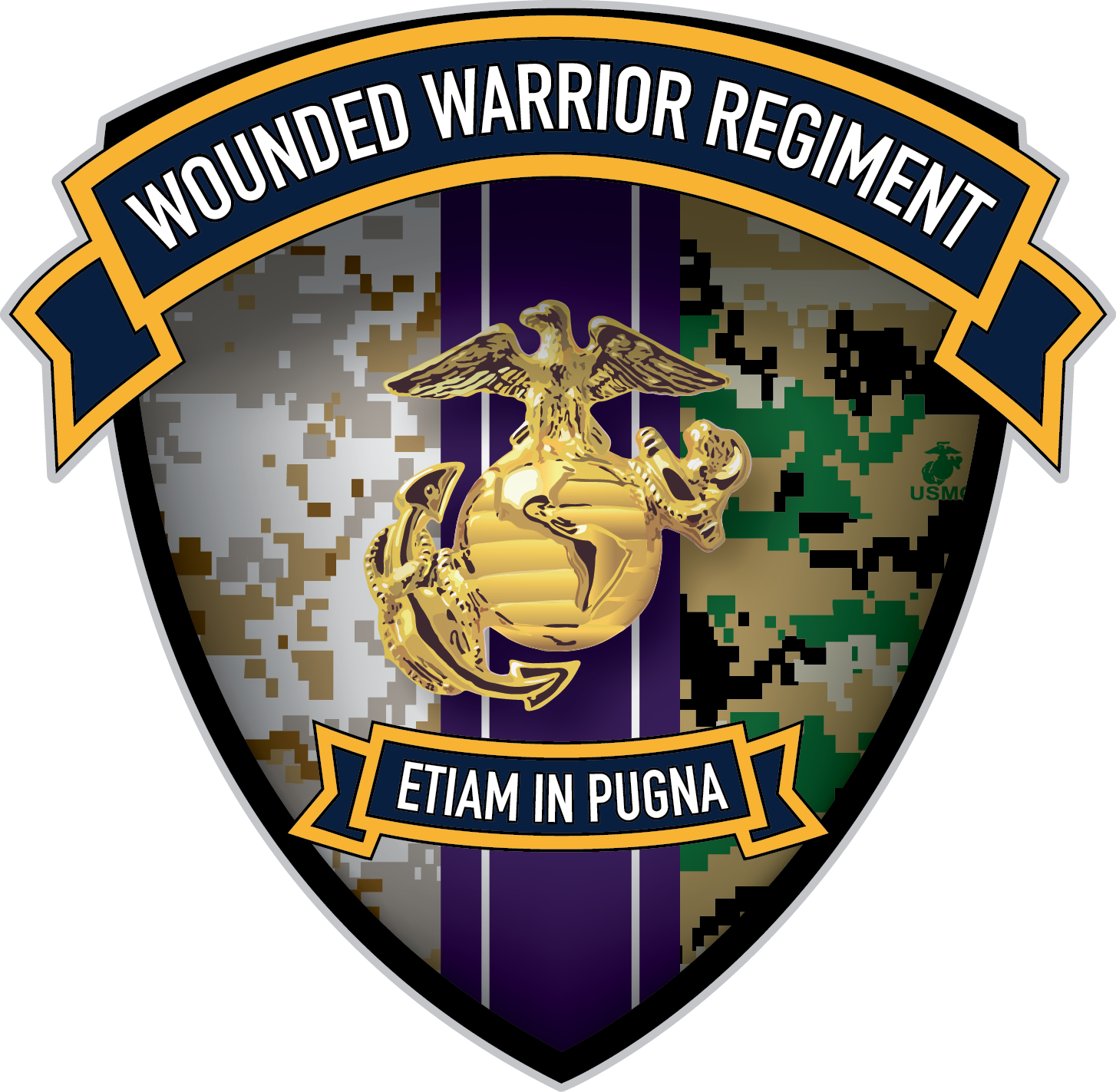
- Unit logo
- Active: 2007 - present
- Branch: United States Marine Corps
- Garrison/HQ: Main: Marine Corps Base Quantico
- Website: Official website

The Wounded Warrior Regiment (WWR) is the official command charged by the Commandant of the United States Marine Corps to provide leadership and facilitate the integration of non-medical and medical care to combat and non-combat wounded, ill, and injured (WII) Marines, sailors attached to Marine units, and their family members in order to maximize their recovery as they return to duty or transition to civilian life.

== Overview ==
In accordance with the Commandant's Planning Guidance, the WWR provides non-medical care and transition support to wounded, ill, and injured (WII) Marines, their families, and caregivers. The Marine Corps care model focuses on returning recovering Marines to their operational units as soon as their medical conditions permit. The WWR administers this support whether the Marines are formally assigned to the regiment or remain with their primary units.

During its course of caring for WII Marines, the WWR has confirmed that their needs are varied and highly dependent upon many factors, to include the acuity of the Marine's wound, illness, or injury; his or her family support system; and the phase and location of their recovery. WII Marines and their families are a highly unique population and they must receive programs and services proportionate to their needs. There is no "one size fits all" response to warrior care.

The world of warrior care is never static and the WWR evolves its structure to ensure that WII Marines and families receive individualized care, proportionate to their existing needs. The Regiment achieves this individualized care by synergizing its internal assets with the appropriate external assets (e.g., federal agencies and private organizations) around the essential point of focus: the mind, body, spirit, and family of the WII Marine. Under this concept, WII Marines are provided leadership and motivation, care coordination, and transition counsel. This ensures their recovery periods are productive and at the end of their recoveries, they are postured for success; whether they return to duty or transition to their civilian communities.

== History ==
The Wounded Warrior Regiment grew from the 2005 Marine For Life ill/injured support section and the 2004 Wounded Warrior barracks on several bases. During his 2006 Planning Guidance, the 34th Commandant of the Marine Corps General James T. Conway highlighted his vision of taking care of wounded warriors and their families. The official establishment of the regiment took place in April 2007.

== Support Assets ==
• Marine leaders: Leaders play a key role in motivating their Marines to meet their established recovery goals. The WWR ensures its leaders have the specific training, tools, and information they need to help their WII Marines make sound decisions.

• Recovery Care Coordinators (RCCs): RCCs serve as the WII Marine's resource subject matter expert to help them define and meet their individual goals for recovery, rehabilitation, and reintegration, and to identify the services needed to achieve these goals. RCCs regularly meet with members of their Marines’ recovery teams to improve care delivery and ensure goals stay on track.

• Medical Section: The WWR headquarters has a Medical Section that advises the Commanding Officer regarding medical issues and emerging technologies and treatments impacting WII Marines. The section includes a Regimental Surgeon, Mental Health Advisor, Nurse Case Manager, Psychological Health Program Coordinator, Traumatic Brain Injury Program Coordinator, and Licensed Clinical Consultants. Together, this team works with public and private medical providers to ensure the best care for WII Marines, particularly in the areas of post-traumatic stress and traumatic brain injury.

• Warrior Athlete Reconditioning Program: Under this program (which is mandatory for all Marines joined to the WWR, but tailored to accommodate their medical limitations), Marines engage in both physical and cognitive activities outside the traditional therapy setting. Activities are individualized to the WII Marines’ needs, and encompass more than 20 sports and activities. Both in individual or team settings, this adaptive sports program greatly improves WII Marines’ overall physical and mental fitness.

• Chaplain Services: The mission of the WWR Chaplain is to provide spiritual and emotional care to WII Marines, their families, and staff. The WWR has chaplains located at the Regiment, its Battalions, and Landstuhl, Germany.

• Job Transition Cell: To enhance community reintegration for WII Marines who will not return to duty, the WWR's Job Transition Cell (composed of Marines and representatives of the Departments of Labor and Veterans Affairs) proactively reaches out to identify employers and job training programs to help them obtain positions where they are most likely to succeed and enjoy promising careers.

• Sergeant Merlin German Wounded Warrior Call Center: The Call Center, dedicated to a fallen Marine who was severely injured in a roadside blast in Iraq in February 2005, is a 24/7 operation that conducts outreach calls to Marines and Marine veterans to determine if their needs are being met, offer assistance, and follow-on monitoring to ensure issue resolution. Additionally, the Call Center receives calls for assistance. The Call Center's toll-free number is 1-877-487-6299. The Call Center also serves as the Regiment's hub for social media outreach to include Facebook and Twitter.

• District Injured Support Coordinators (DISCs): DISCs are mobilized Reserve Marines who are located throughout the country to conduct face-to-face visits and telephone outreach to WII Marines and their families who are recovering within their assigned region.

• Family Support Staff: The WWR's Family Support Staff includes Family Readiness Officers and Family Support Coordinators who provide care to the families of WII Marines throughout multiple phases of recovery and in geographically dispersed locations.

• Integrated Disability Evaluation System (IDES) Support: The WWR has Regional Limited Duty Coordinators who help Marines processing through the IDES and Wounded Warrior Attorneys who advise and support WII Marines through this process.

• Wounded Warrior Hope and Care Centers: The Centers will be located at Camp Pendleton, CA (opening fall 2011) and Camp Lejeune, NC (opening summer 2012). These facilities will provide “one-stop” services for wounded warriors and their families, such as counseling, employment and transition support, physical training and therapy, the Warrior Athlete Reconditioning Program, and examination rooms. The Hope and Care Centers complement additional military construction efforts to build and renovate barracks, family housing, hospitals and other administrative support to the Marine Corps’ Wounded Warrior Program.

=== Sergeant Merlin German Wounded Warrior Call Center ===
Sergeant Merlin German was deployed to Iraq with 2nd Battalion 11th Marines when he was wounded in the detonation of an improvised explosive device on February 21, 2005. With burns over 97 percent of his body, he was given only a three percent chance of survival, but lived for more than three years in recovery. He regained his ability to walk, purchased a home, and actively participated in founding and forming the Merlin's Miracles charity organization designated to help child burn victims. At the age of 22 on April 11, 2008, German died of surgical complications.

In 2008, Wounded Warrior Regiment officials held an unveiling ceremony to rename their call center in Dumfries, Virginia the “Sgt. Merlin German Wounded Warrior Call Center” in his honor. The call center started operations in December 2007 and handled more than 35,000 cases in the first year of operations. The mission of the call center is to empower the Marine Corps to provide support to Marines 24–7 to include advocacy, resource identification and referral, information distribution, and care coordination for wounded, ill or injured Marines and their families.

== See also ==
- Army Wounded Warrior Program
- Warrior Games
