= Jasim Mohammed Saleh =

Iraqi level-2 Baathist (born 1955)

Jasim Mohammed Saleh Habib
- Born: 1955
- Military career
- Allegiance: Baathist Iraq (?–2003); Iraq (2004–?)
- Branch: Iraqi Army; Republican Guard
- Rank: General
- Commands: Republican Guard Brigade; 38th Infantry Division
- Conflicts: Iran–Iraq War; 1991 uprisings in Iraq; Iraq War

General Jasim Mohammed Saleh Habib (not to be confused with sahwa leader Jasim Mohammad Saleh Suwaidawi) was an Iraqi level-2 Baathist who commanded the Iraqi Army under Saddam Hussein. After US forces failed to capture Fallujah, they turned control of the city over to Saleh, and his own private militia in the hope that he could restore order to the city.

A former chief-of-staff for a Republican Guard brigade who later commanded the Iraqi 38th Infantry Division, Saleh was stationed in Amarah in 1991 to help quell a Shia uprising.

Saleh agreed to formally report to US General James T. Conway, who had arranged the transfer without conferring with US superiors. There was less than a week's discussion about the deal, after Saleh approached the US Marines promising that he could bring the city under control.

A native of Fallujah, Saleh was a prominent member of the city's largest tribe and closely related to its leader.

Upon entering the city as with 200 troops, Saleh was wearing his Republican Guard uniform and waving the Flag of Iraq, which had just been abolished by the Iraqi Governing Council several days earlier. He also had a large flag placed at the entrance to the city.

Saleh drew controversy on May 2, just days after the handover of power, when he stated that there were no foreign fighters in Fallujah. This, combined with the discovery that Saleh had been involved in atrocities against Kurds during the Iran–Iraq War, led to US military authorities announcing he would not be allowed to lead his private militia any longer. Two days later it was announced that Muhammed Latif would be given control of the city instead.
