= Army Wounded Warrior Program =

US army support program

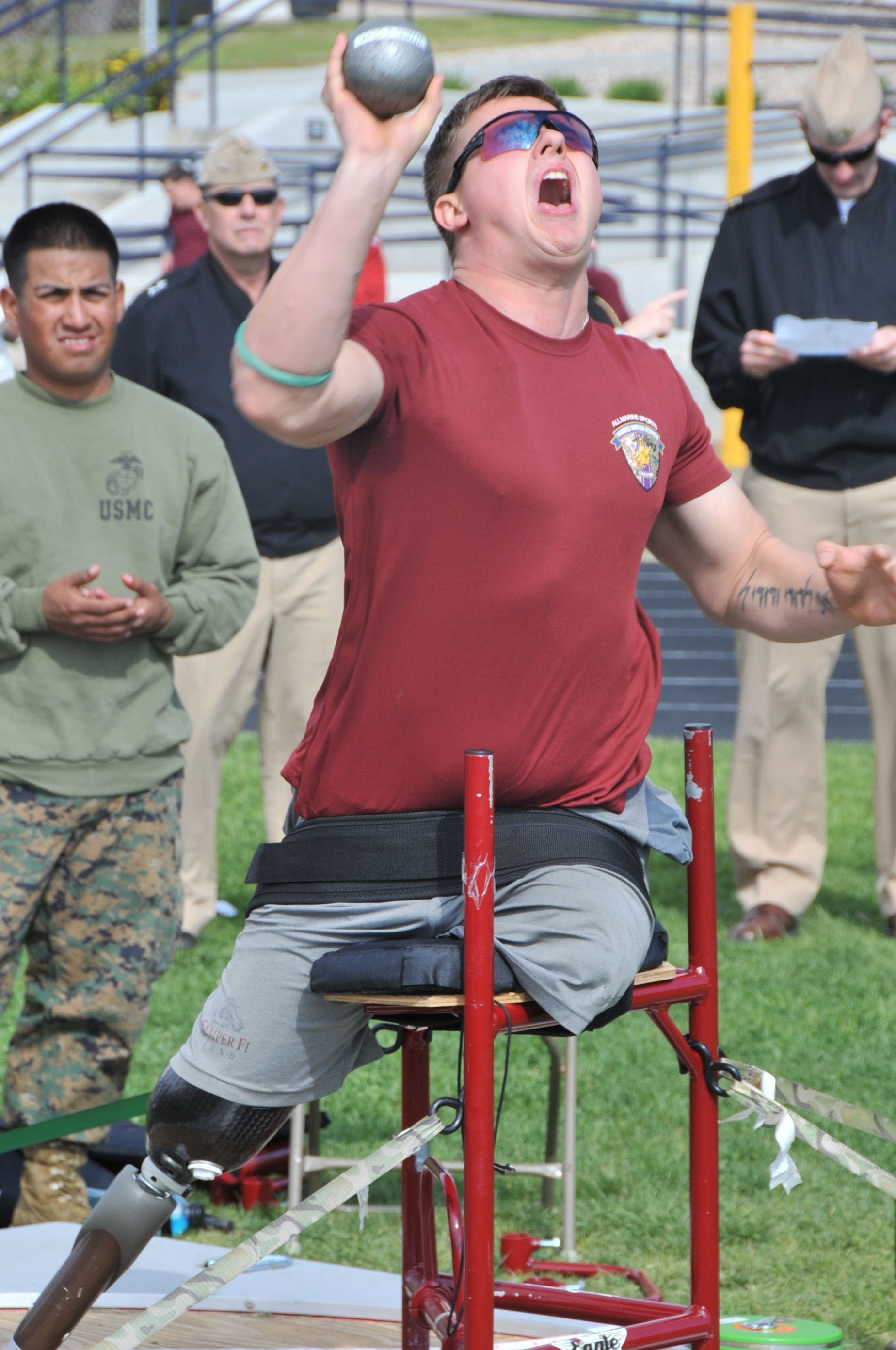
Competitors participated in the shot put during the 2012 U.S. Marine Corps Wounded Warrior Trials, Feb. 19, at Camp Pendleton

The Army Wounded Warrior Program (AW2) is the official U.S. Army program that assists and advocates for severely wounded, ill or injured Soldiers, Veterans, and their Families and Caregivers, wherever they are located, regardless of military status. Soldiers who qualify for AW2 are assigned to the program as soon as possible after arriving at the Warrior Transition Unit (WTU). AW2 supports these Soldiers and their Families throughout their recovery and transition, even into Veteran status. Through the local, personalized support of AW2 Advocates, AW2 strives to foster the Soldier's independence. There are more than 20,000 severely wounded, ill and injured Soldiers and Veterans currently enrolled in AW2.

== Eligibility requirements ==
In order to be considered eligible for entry into AW2, Soldiers must suffer from wounds, illnesses, or injuries incurred in the line of duty after September 10, 2001 AND receive or expect to receive at least a 30% rating from the Integrated Disability Evaluation System (IDES) for one of the conditions listed below:

- Blindness or severe loss of vision
- Loss of limb
- Hearing loss or deafness
- Burns or permanent disfigurement
- Paralysis/spinal cord injury
- Traumatic Brain Injury (TBI)
- Fatal and incurable disease with limited life expectancy of one year or less
- Receive a 30 percent IDES (Army) disability rating for any other combat related condition or condition caused by an instrumentality of war, including Post Traumatic Stress Disorder (PTSD) and other Behavioral Health (BH) conditions
- Receive a combined 50 percent IDES (Army) disability rating for any other combat related conditions or conditions caused by an instrumentality of war

At this time there are no exceptions to AW2 entry criteria. However, AW2 is currently evaluating the appeals process.

== AW2 Advocates ==
Upon enrollment in the U.S. Army Wounded Warrior Program (AW2), each Soldier is assigned an AW2 Advocate, who helps the Soldier with the recovery and transition process, fostering the Soldier's independence. Together, AW2 Advocates and AW2 Soldiers collaborate to set goals for the Soldiers' and Families' future. AW2 Advocates are located at Warrior Transition Units (WTUs), military treatment facilities (MTFs), most Army installations and Department of Veterans Affairs (VA) facilities to provide personalized local support on a wide range of issues and resources.

== The Army Recovery Care Program (ARCP) ==
The Army Recovery Care Program (ARCP) transitions Soldiers back to the force and/or to Veteran status, through a comprehensive program of medical case management/rehabilitation management, professional development and achievement of personal goals.

ARCP provides policy oversight to the 14 Soldier Recovery Units (SRU) located on military installations across the country. SRUs manage the recovery of wounded, ill and injured Soldiers requiring complex care. The program also provides resources and advocacy for Families and caregivers of Soldiers recovering in the program. More than 80,000 Soldiers have received ARCP services since its inception in 2007.

== Services provided by other military branches ==
Wounded or disabled Veterans from other branches of service are served through other programs.

- U.S. Marine Corps: the Marine For Life program and the Wounded Warrior Regiment, which has battalion headquarters on the east and west coasts.
- U.S. Air Force: Air Force Wounded Warrior Program (AFW2) for airmen with certain combat-related injuries.
- U.S. Navy: Safe Harbor provides personalized support and assistance to severely injured sailors and their families.

== See also ==
- Warrior Games (multi-sport event)
