= Camp Fallujah =

Former American military compound in Iraq

Camp Fallujah FOB St. Mere
- Fallujah, Al Anbar Governorate, Iraq in Iraq
- Camp Fallujah Insignia

Site information
- Owner: Ministry of Defence
- Operator: United States Army; United States Marine Corps

Location
- Shown within Iraq
- Coordinates: 33°18′54″N 43°52′59″E

Site history
- Built: 1980s
- In use: 2003-2009
- Battles/wars: Iraq War; Iraqi insurgency (2003-2006); First Battle of Fallujah; Second Battle of Fallujah

Garrison information
- Garrison: HQ, 1st Division (Iraq)

Camp Fallujah (formerly known as the MEK (Mujahedin-E Khalq) Compound) is a large compound in Fallujah, Iraq formerly used by the U.S. Army and U.S. Marines from 2004 to 2009 and now used by the Iraqi Ground Forces.

== History ==
Before the Marine occupation, the Iranian dissident group called Mujahideen-e-Khalq used the compound as a training camp, but turned it over to the U.S. Army 3rd Armored Cavalry Regiment on May 11, 2003 after the Mujahideen-e-Khalq surrender. The 82nd Airborne Division took over the facility in August 2003 and created Forward Operating Base St. Mere. On March 24, 2004, the 1st Marine Expeditionary Force took control from the 82nd Airborne and renamed the FOB, Camp Fallujah in order to better associate the camp with the local Iraqi city. On January 12, 2009, the Government of Iraq took control of the compound from the United States military.

The camp is adjacent to the other major U.S. base in Fallujah, the former Ba'athist resort Camp Baharia (also known as "Dreamland").

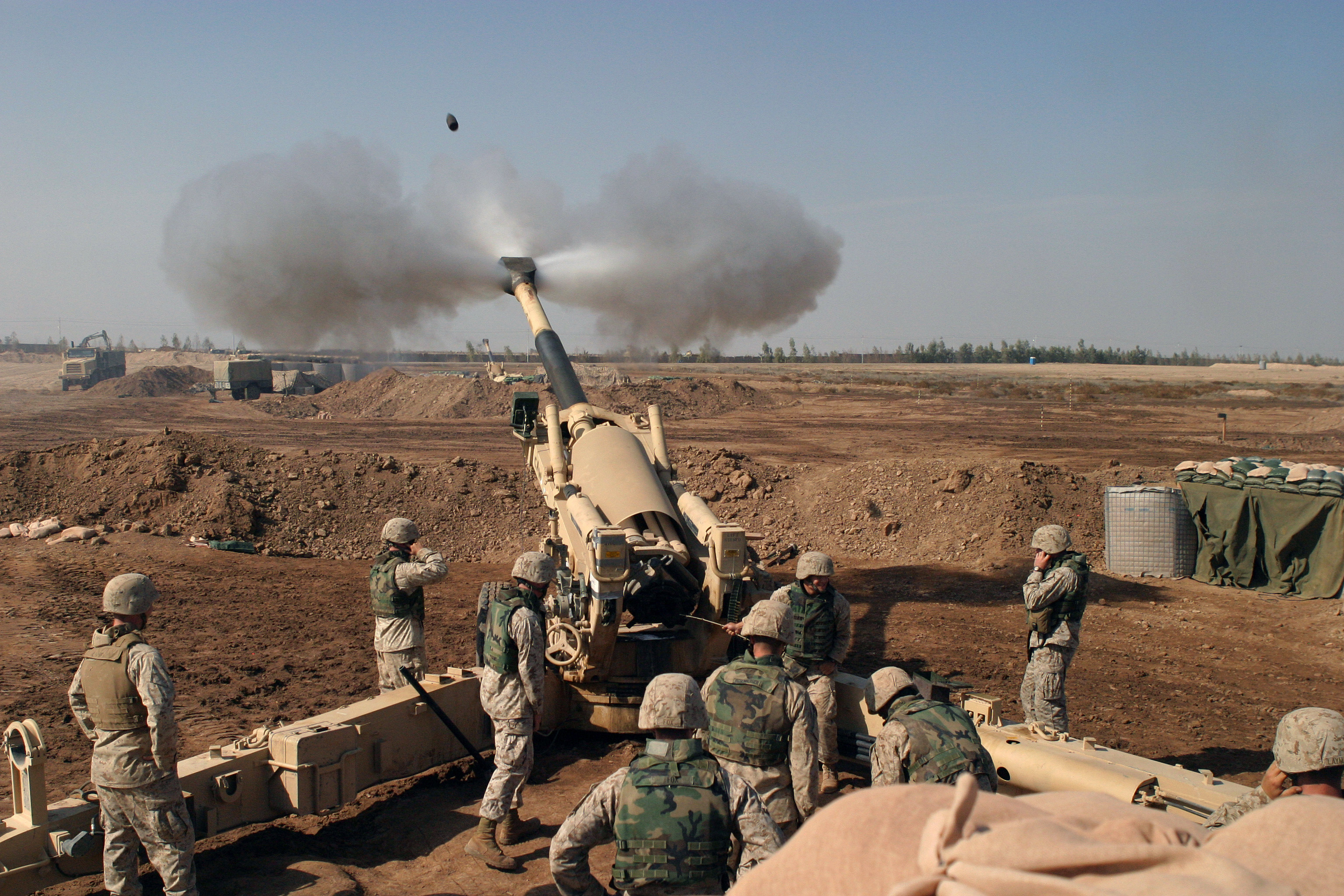
An M198 howitzer firing from Camp Fallujah, Iraq in 2004

== U.S. Operational Names ==
- 3rd Armored Cavalry Regiment - MEK Compound
- 82nd Airborne - FOB St. Mere
- United States Marine Corps - Camp Fallujah

== See also ==
- History of the United States Marine Corps
- List of United States Marine Corps installations
- List of United States Military installations in Iraq
