= Muhammed Latif =

- Military career
- Allegiance: Baathist Iraq (?–2003); Iraq (May–September 2004)
- Branch: Iraqi Army
- Rank: Major-General
- Commands: Fallujah Brigade
- Conflicts: Iraq War

Muhammed Latif (Arabic: محمد لطيف) is an Iraqi major general, and former member of the Baath Party. The city of Fallujah was handed over to Muhammed Latif, replacing the earlier U.S. choice, Jasim Mohammed Saleh, when it was discovered that the latter had been involved in atrocities against Kurds during the Iran–Iraq War.

Jane's Intelligence Review said that he was named Mohammed Abdel Latif and that he was a former military intelligence officer.

Latif was granted the right to raise an army of 1,100 soldiers known as the Fallujah Brigade, who would wear their Baathist military uniforms and control the city (which US forces had proven unable to pacify). Within days, the city's mayor, Muhammed Ibrahim al-Juraissey said that there was a visible difference as the city began to calm now under Iraqi leadership once again.

Nevertheless, the Fallujah Brigade dissolved and had turned over all the US weapons to the insurgency by September, prompting the return of US forces in the Second Battle of Fallujah in November, resulting in US reoccupation of the city.
