= Muhammed Ibrahim al-Juraissey =

Mayor of Fallujah, Iraq

Muhammed Ibrahim al-Juraissey (Arabic: محمد ابراهيم الجريسي) was the mayor of Fallujah during the 2003 Invasion of Iraq. On May 20, 2004 he announced that the time of bitter fighting in Fallujah was ended, and that Iraqis and Americans were now working together on rebuilding the city.
