= Taha Bidaywi Hamed =

Iraqi politician

Taha Bidaywi Hamed is an Iraqi politician. He was elected by local tribal leaders to lead the town council of Fallujah on April 30, 2003. The position had been vacant after the previous administrators - loyal to Saddam Hussein's regime - fled to avoid being caught up in the 2003 invasion of Iraq.

Described as strongly pro-American, Hamed blamed Baathist officers for provoking anti-US sentiments in the city. However, when seven US soldiers were injured in a series of grenade attacks in early May, he was quoted as stating that the general population wished for the troops to leave the city, because they were occupying a Baathist headquarters.
