= James T. Conway =

United States Marine Corps general

James Terry Conway
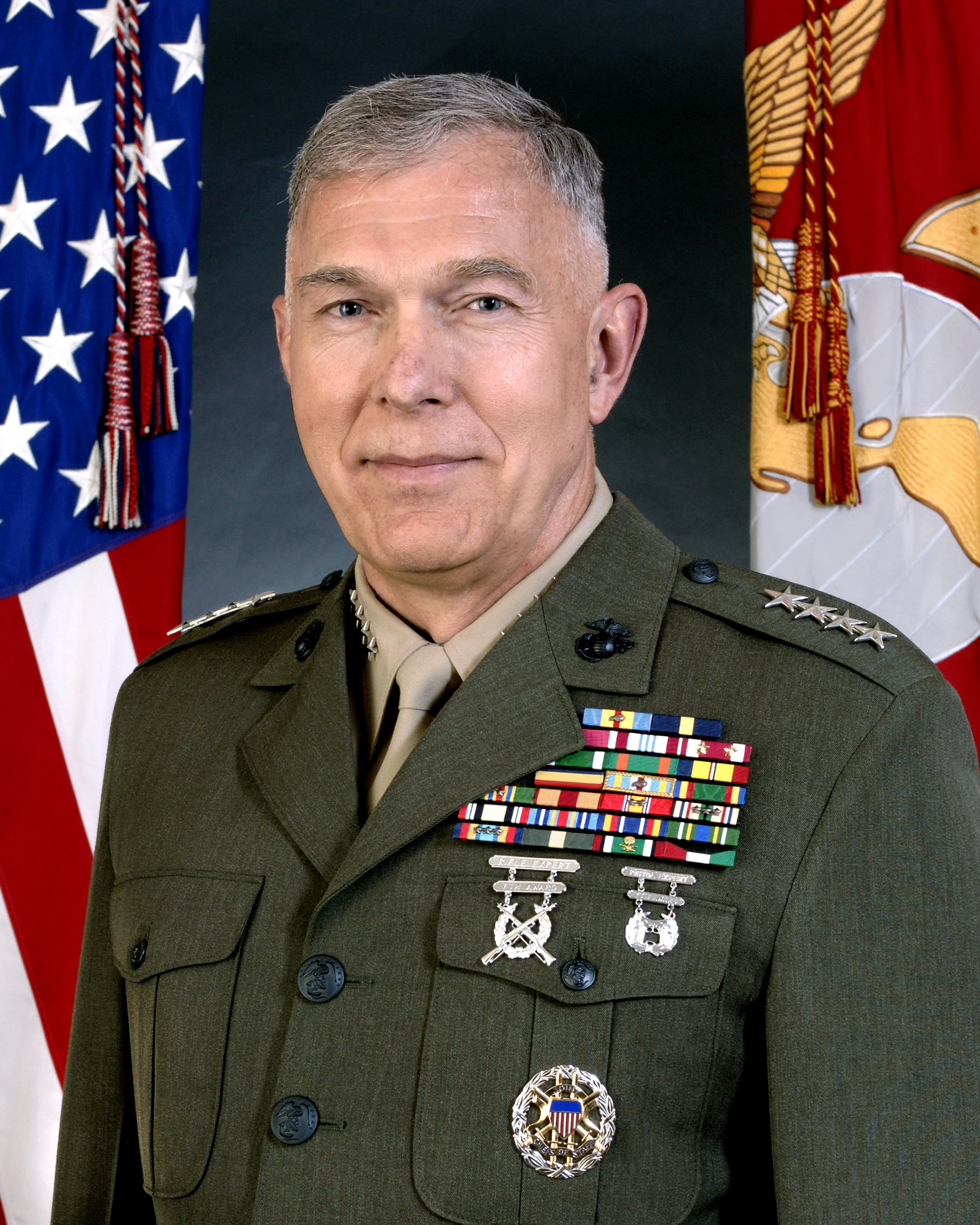
- Conway in 2006
- Born: December 26, 1947 (age 78); Walnut Ridge, Arkansas, U.S.
- Military career
- Allegiance: United States
- Branch: United States Marine Corps
- Service years: 1970–2010
- Rank: General
- Commands: Commandant of the Marine Corps; I Marine Expeditionary Force; 1st Marine Division; The Basic School; 3rd Battalion 2nd Marines
- Conflicts: Persian Gulf War; Iraq War; First Battle of Fallujah
- Awards: Defense Distinguished Service Medal (3); Navy Distinguished Service Medal; Legion of Merit; Defense Meritorious Service Medal; Meritorious Service Medal (3); Commander of the Legion of Honour (France)

James Terry Conway (born December 26, 1947) is a retired United States Marine Corps four-star general who served as the 34th Commandant of the Marine Corps. Among his previous postings were Director of Operations (J-3) on the Joint Chiefs of Staff, Commanding General of 1st Marine Division and I Marine Expeditionary Force, taking part in the 2003 invasion of Iraq and the First Battle of Fallujah.

== Early life and education ==
Conway was born in Walnut Ridge, Arkansas. He graduated from Roosevelt High School in St. Louis, Missouri, and then attended Southeast Missouri State University, where he was a member of the Sigma Phi Epsilon fraternity, graduating in 1969 with a Bachelor of Science degree in psychology. Conway is a graduate of the Infantry Officers Advanced Course, the Marine Corps Command and Staff College, and the Air War College. He was commissioned as an infantry officer in 1970.

== Career ==
Conway's first assignment was command of a rifle platoon with 3rd Battalion 1st Marines, based at Camp Pendleton. He also served as the battalion's 106mm recoilless rifle platoon commander. Later, he served as Marine detachment executive officer aboard the aircraft carrier USS Kitty Hawk (CV-63) and as commanding officer of the Sea School at Marine Corps Recruit Depot San Diego.

After graduating with honors from the Army's Infantry Officers Advanced Course, Conway commanded two companies in the 2nd Marine Regiment's Operations and Security section. As a field grade officer, he commanded two companies of students and taught tactics at The Basic School. He then went on to serve as operations officer for the 31st Marine Amphibious Unit, with sea duty in the western Pacific and in contingency operations off Beirut, Lebanon.

Returning to the United States, Conway was assigned as Senior Aide to the Chairman of the Joint Chiefs of Staff for two years. After graduating from Marine Corps Command and Staff College with honors, he took command of 3rd Battalion 2nd Marines through its eight-month deployment to Southwest Asia during the Gulf War.

After the war, he was promoted to colonel and assigned command of The Basic School. In 1992–1993, he attended MIT Seminar XXI. Promoted to brigadier general in December 1995, he again was assigned to the Joint Chiefs and later served as president of the Marine Corps University. After being promoted to major general, he served as commander of the 1st Marine Division and as Deputy Commanding General of Marine Forces Central. He was promoted to lieutenant general and assumed command of I Marine Expeditionary Force (I MEF) on November 16, 2002. He commanded I MEF during two combat tours in Iraq, with 60,000 troops under his command, including Marines, soldiers, sailors, and British forces. In the book The Iraq War, Conway was described as, "big, buff, well read and well educated ... he represented all that was best about the new United States Marine Corps, which General Al Gray as the commandant had set up."

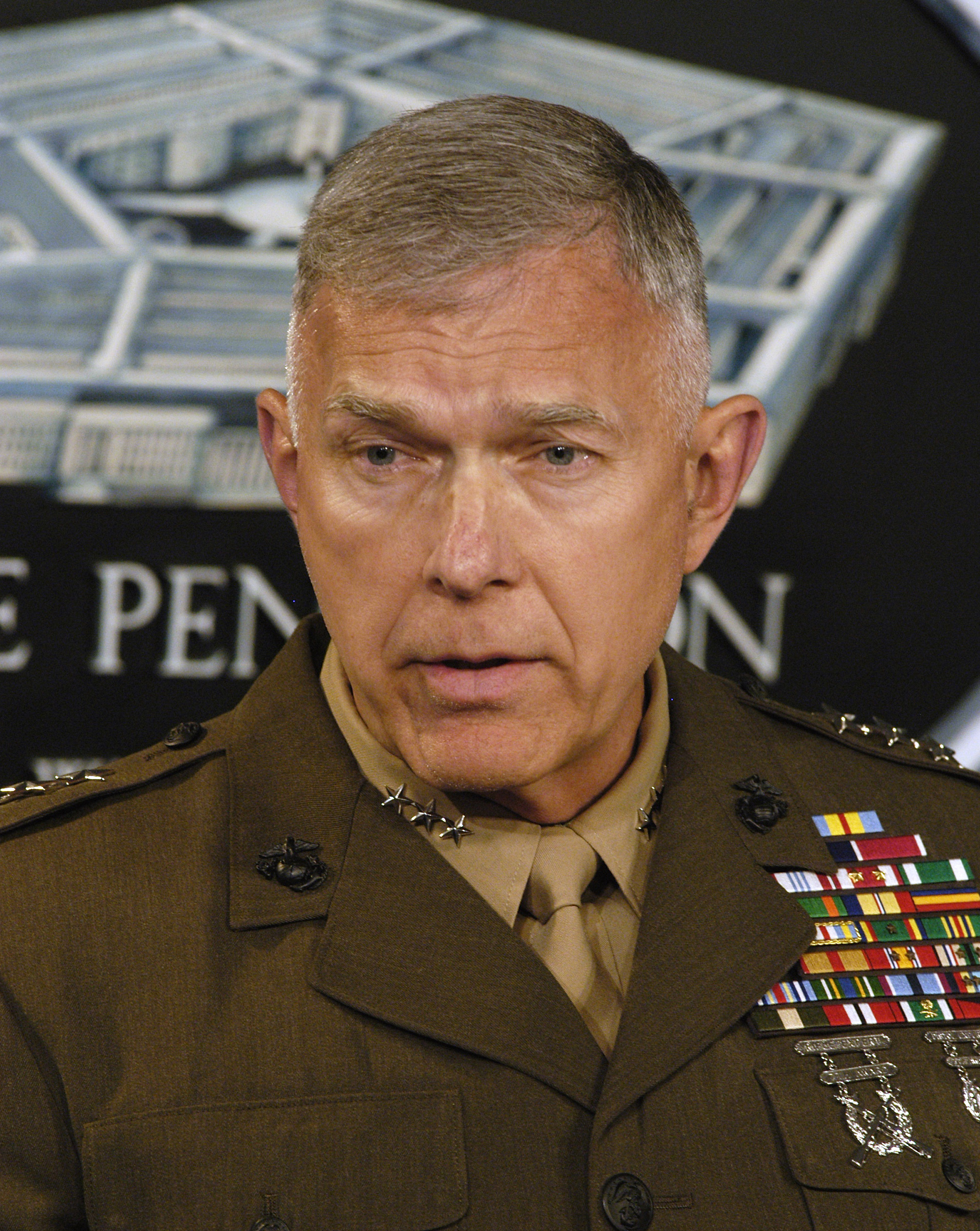
Conway responding to questions at a Pentagon briefing, June 2005

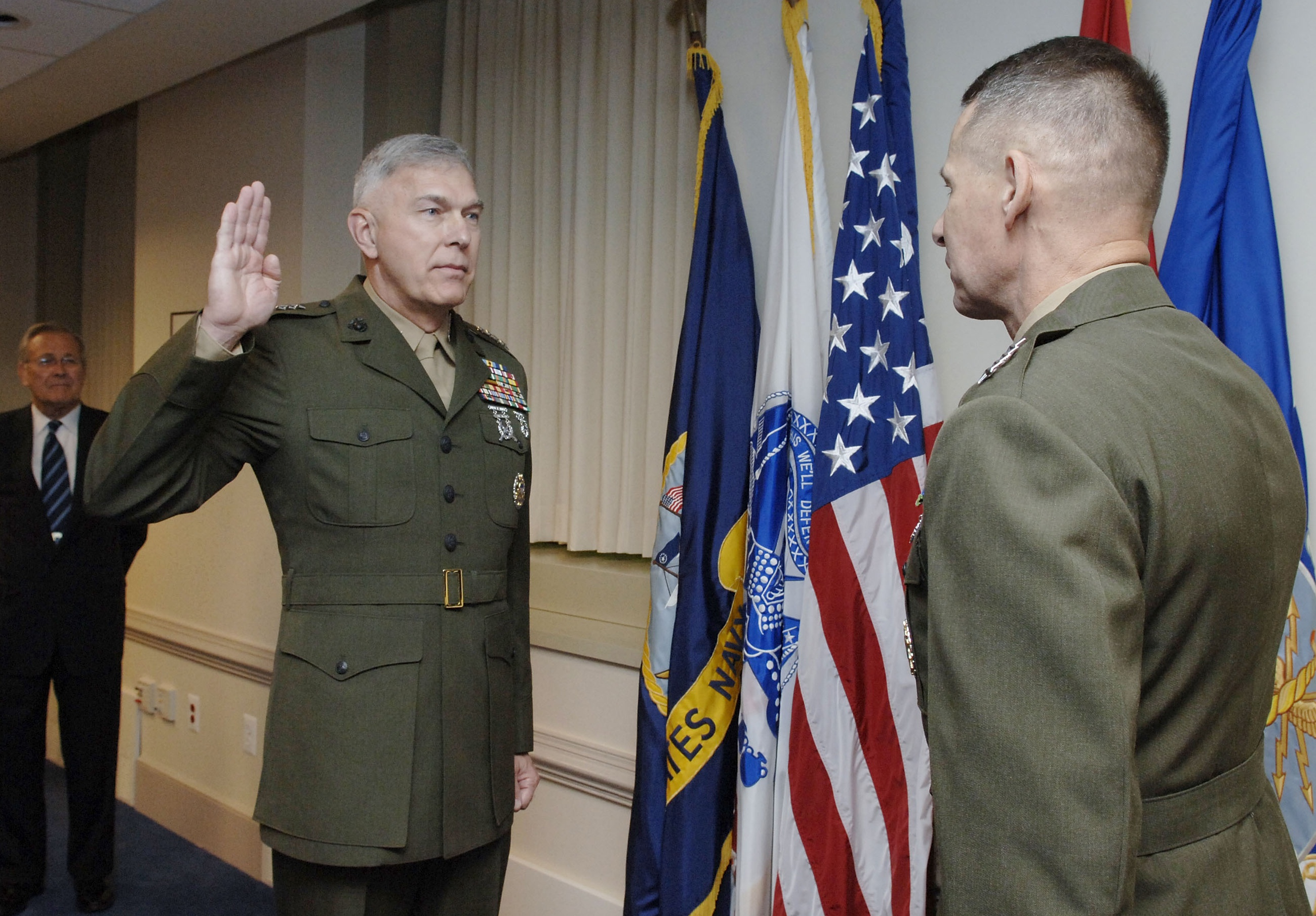
Conway is sworn in by General Peter Pace, Chairman of the Joint Chiefs of Staff, on November 13, 2006

US Marines of the 1st Marine Expeditionary Force under Conway's command constructed the military base "Camp Alpha" on top of ancient Babylonian ruins following the invasion. Though a US military spokesman claimed that the project was discussed with the "head of the Babylon museum", the construction of the base drew intense criticism from archaeologists, who contend that it caused irreparable damage to one of the most important sites in the world.

On June 13, 2006, Conway was nominated by President George W. Bush to become the 34th Commandant of the Marine Corps; the nomination was confirmed by the Senate on August 2, 2006. On November 13, Conway was promoted to the rank of general at Marine Barracks, Washington, D.C., and became the 34th Commandant of the Marine Corps. He was the first Commandant in nearly 40 years to have not served in the Vietnam War.

On June 11, 2009, Conway spoke at the National Press Club about the importance of maintaining the Amphibious assault ships to lift two Marine Expeditionary Brigades and the time "at home" away from the current wars to train for amphibious assault.

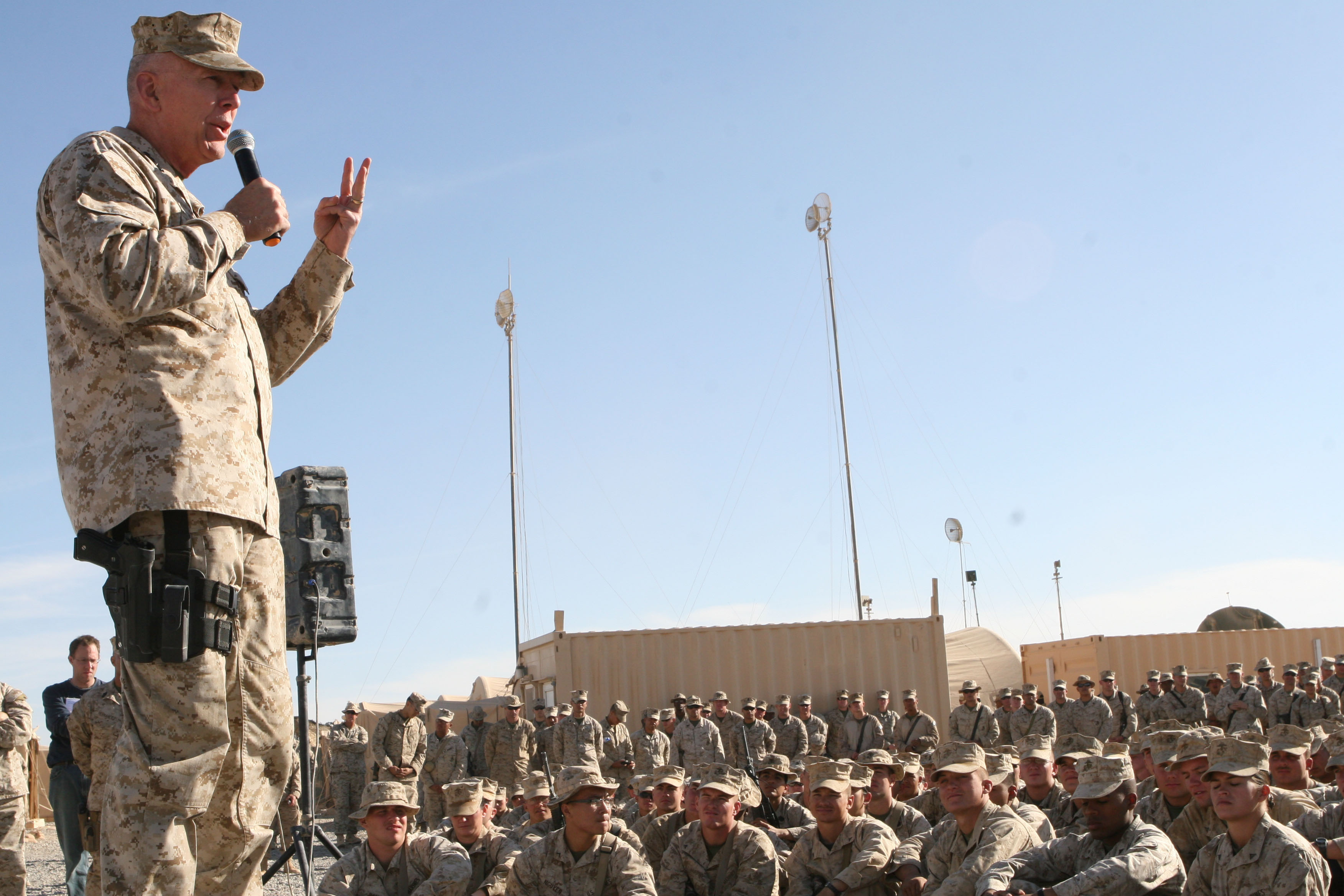
Conway talks to his Marines, September 2005

Conway was reported to have had "major reservations" about the repeal of "don't ask, don't tell", in contrast to the Pentagon opinion that the younger rank and file of the military did not have such reservations about serving with openly gay service members. Conway, along with Chief of Naval Operations, Admiral Gary Roughead, and Chief of Staff of the United States Army, General George Casey, supported running a one-year study on the effects of a possible repeal. Conway said that if gay Marines are allowed to serve openly, he might need to change the policy that requires unmarried Marines to share rooms. The policy was repealed on December 22, 2010, after his tenure as Commandant had ended.

On October 22, 2010, Conway turned the position of Commandant over to General James F. Amos, his Assistant Commandant, at a ceremony at Marine Barracks, Washington, D.C., Defense Secretary Robert Gates presented Conway with his third Defense Distinguished Service Medal during the change-in-command. He then retired on November 1.

== Personal life ==
Conway is married to Anette Conway and together they have three children, two sons, currently serving in the Marine Corps, and a daughter.

Post-retirement, Conway has held many different positions including a board member seat for Textron, Colt Firearms, General Dynamics, and the Center for Naval Analysis, and xG technologies. He sits on the Board of Directors for Warriors & Quiet Waters and is a member of the board of trustees for the Marine Corps University Foundation.

Conway served as an adjunct faculty member of Georgetown University.

== Awards and decorations ==
Conway has been decorated for service, to include:

1st row	Defense Distinguished Service Medal w/ 2 oak leaf clusters				Office of the Joint Chiefs of Staff Identification Badge
2nd row	Navy Distinguished Service Medal	Legion of Merit	Defense Meritorious Service Medal	Meritorious Service Medal w/ 2 award stars	Office of the Joint Chiefs of Staff Identification Badge
3rd row	Navy and Marine Corps Commendation Medal	Navy and Marine Corps Achievement Medal	Combat Action Ribbon	Navy Presidential Unit Citation	Office of the Joint Chiefs of Staff Identification Badge
4th row	Joint Meritorious Unit Award w/ 2 oak leaf clusters	Navy Unit Commendation	Meritorious Unit Commendation w/ 1 service star	Marine Corps Expeditionary Medal	Office of the Joint Chiefs of Staff Identification Badge
5th row	National Defense Service Medal w/ 2 service stars	Southwest Asia Service Medal w/ 3 campaign stars	Iraq Campaign Medal w/ 2 campaign stars	Global War on Terrorism Expeditionary Medal	Office of the Joint Chiefs of Staff Identification Badge
6th row	Global War on Terrorism Service Medal	Korea Defense Service Medal	Sea Service Deployment Ribbon w/ 3 service stars	Marine Corps Drill Instructor Ribbon	Office of the Joint Chiefs of Staff Identification Badge
7th row	The Khalifyyeh Order of Bahrain, Knight	Legion of Honor, Commander	Kuwait Liberation Medal (Saudi Arabia)	Kuwait Liberation Medal (Kuwait)	Office of the Joint Chiefs of Staff Identification Badge

- He also holds 7 expert awards in both rifle and pistol marksmanship badges. In 2010, Conway was the recipient of the distinguished "Keeper of the Flame" award.

== See also ==
- List of United States Marine Corps four-star generals
- United States Marine Corps Wounded Warrior Regiment

== Notes ==
Military offices
Preceded by Michael Hagee	Commandant of the Marine Corps; 2006–2010	Succeeded by James F. Amos
