= Camp Baharia =

U.S. military installation outside of Fallujah, Iraq

Camp Baharia
- Fallujah, Al Anbar Governorate in Iraq

Site information
- Owner: Ministry of Defence
- Operator: United States Army; United States Marine Corps

Location
- Shown within Iraq
- Coordinates: 33°20′33″N 43°51′19″E

Site history
- Built: 2003
- In use: 2003-2009

Camp Baharia, also known as Dreamland or FOB Volturno, was a U.S. military installation that was just outside the city of Fallujah, Iraq. It was the smaller of two major U.S. military bases maintained just outside the Fallujah city limits, during the Iraq War.

== Etymology ==
Camp Baharia was often referred to by U.S. soldiers by its original nickname, "Dreamland". The Forward Operating Base (FOB) was originally named FOB Volturno in 2003 by the first troops that occupied the area, 1-325th Airborne Infantry Regiment, 82nd Airborne Division. A year later in 2004, the camp was renamed by the U.S. Marine Corps after they relieved the 82nd Airborne, using an Arabic word for Marine Corps, mushaat al-baharia, which translates roughly into naval infantry. The camp was referred to as "FOB Volturno" by the U.S. Army, and as "Camp Baharia" by the U.S. Marine Corps.

== Background ==
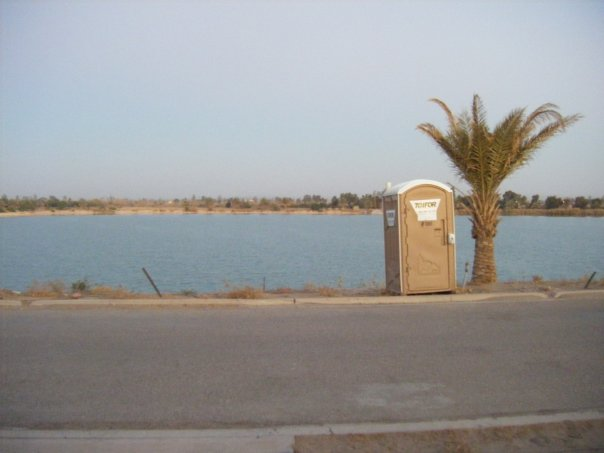
The lake in the center of Camp Baharia

Prior to the Iraq War, Camp Baharia once operated as a Ba'ath Party resort, where it was used as an opulent fortress where Qusay Hussein and Uday Hussein would stay.

Dreamland was first occupied by a small element of the 82nd Airborne Division in April 2003 but was quickly turned over to the 3rd Armored Cavalry Regiment before the end of the month. Dreamland was then taken over by 2nd Brigade of the 3rd Infantry Division but returned to the 3rd Armored Cavalry Regiment when the 3rd Infantry Division returned home. As 2003 came to a close, Dreamland was taken over and operated by the 82nd Airborne Division until March 2004. 2nd Battalion, 1st Marines took over operations prior to Operation Vigilant Resolve and renamed the base Camp Baharia. 3rd Battalion, 5th Marines took over the forward operating base in September 2004.

As of 2005 Camp Baharia also supplied the entire Iraqi Army in the Fallujah Area of Operation with filtered water. The camp was ideal for this because of the large lake in the center. On a twice daily basis, a lone US Marine would lead five to seven Sudanese truck drivers with water tankers from the East Fallujah Iraqi Camp (EFIC) to Camp Baharia to replenish the supply of water for the Iraqi Army.

== History ==
Camp Baharia sat adjacent to a large former Mujahideen-e-Khalq compound, the MEK Compound, which was the main U.S. base for forces in Fallujah from 2003 to 2009. The site was officially named Forward Operating Base ("FOB") Volturno by the U.S. Army in 2003 and renamed Camp Baharia when the U.S. Marines took control of the base from the U.S. Army in 2004. The camp was home to soldiers from the U.S. Army's 82nd Airborne Division, and U.S. Marines from 2nd Battalion, 3rd Marines and 2nd Battalion, 1st Marines, 1st Battalion, 6th Marines in 2005, 2nd Battalion, 6th Marines (Regimental Combat Team 5) in 2006 (2/6 was also stationed at Camp Baharia during the summer of 2007) 1st Battalion 25th Marines in 2006 and 1st Battalion 24th Marines from late 2006 to early 2007 also stationed at Camp Baharia, and 1st Battalion, 3rd Marines in 2008.

== In popular culture ==
- Camp Baharia was featured in a 2006 documentary film, Occupation: Dreamland, which followed U.S. Army soldiers from the 82nd Airborne based at Camp Baharia.
