= Martyrs' Cemetery =

Cemetery in Fallujah, Iraq

- Iraq
- Used for those deceased
- Established: 2004
- Location: 33.4202579°N 43.3044875°E near Fallujah
- Total burials: approximately 500
- Unknowns: hundreds

Burials by nation
- Iraqis - hundreds Tunisians - 1

Burials by war
- Iraq War

The Martyrs' Cemetery of Fallujah is the chief burial site of Iraqis killed during the First Battle of Fallujah, both insurgents and civilians. It was formerly the football field of the Falluja Sports Club, and was converted into a cemetery after US troops blockaded attempts to reach the city's main cemetery.

A sign outside the cemetery reads "This cemetery is given by the people of Fallujah to the heroic martyrs of the battle against the Americans, and to the martyrs of the Jihadi operations against the Americans, assigned and approved by the Mujahideen Shura Council in Fallujah."

The cemetery holds between 250 and 500 bodies, only one of which is identified as a foreign fighter, a Tunisian. At least 22 of the dead were from a single US mortar-attack in June 2004.

The road leading to the cemetery has been named Martyrs' Cemetery Road, and according to the Mafkarat al-Islam was the site of an August 26 2006 attack against a US convoy on the road headed to the cemetery, which destroyed a Humvee and killed three American troops, wounding two others, and a similar attack nine days later.

Another football field in the city was used for similar purposes.
