= 2nd Battalion, 11th Marines =

- 2/11 Insignia
- Active: Sept 5 1918 – August 11, 1919; May 9, 1927 – September 10, 1927; January 5, 1928 – August 20, 1929; January 1, 1941 – September 28, 1947; August 7, 1950 – present
- Country: United States of America
- Branch: United States Marine Corps
- Type: Artillery
- Role: Provide fires in support of the 5th Marine Regiment
- Size: 800 Marines
- Part of: 11th Marine Regiment; 1st Marine Division
- Garrison/HQ: Marine Corps Base Camp Pendleton
- Nickname: "Patriot"
- Motto: "Regiments Best"
- Engagements: World War II; Battle of Guadalcanal; Battle of Cape Gloucester; Battle of Peleliu; Battle of Okinawa; Korean War; Battle of Inchon; Battle of Chosin Reservoir; Vietnam War; Operation Desert Storm; War on terror; Operation Iraqi Freedom

Commanders
- Current commander: LtCol J. M. Noone
- Command Sergeant Major: SgtMaj V. A. Rodriguez

2nd Battalion, 11th Marines (2/11) is an artillery battalion comprising four firing batteries (Echo, Fox, Golf, and India) and a Headquarters Battery. The battalion is stationed at Marine Corps Base Camp Pendleton, California. Its primary weapon system is the M777 lightweight howitzer. The battalion was the first in the Marine Corps to fully transition from the M198 Howitzer. They fall under the command of the 11th Marine Regiment and the 1st Marine Division.

== Mission ==
Provide direct support of the 11th Marine Regiment in time of conflict. That support may come in the traditional fashion of artillery support to maneuver forces, or by providing batteries to serve as provisional rifle companies. They also have the secondary mission of conducting civil-military operations or "CAG Ops".

== Current units ==
- Headquarters Battery (HQ)
- Battery E (Echo)
- Battery F (Foxtrot)
- Battery G (Golf)
- Battery H (Hotel)

== History ==
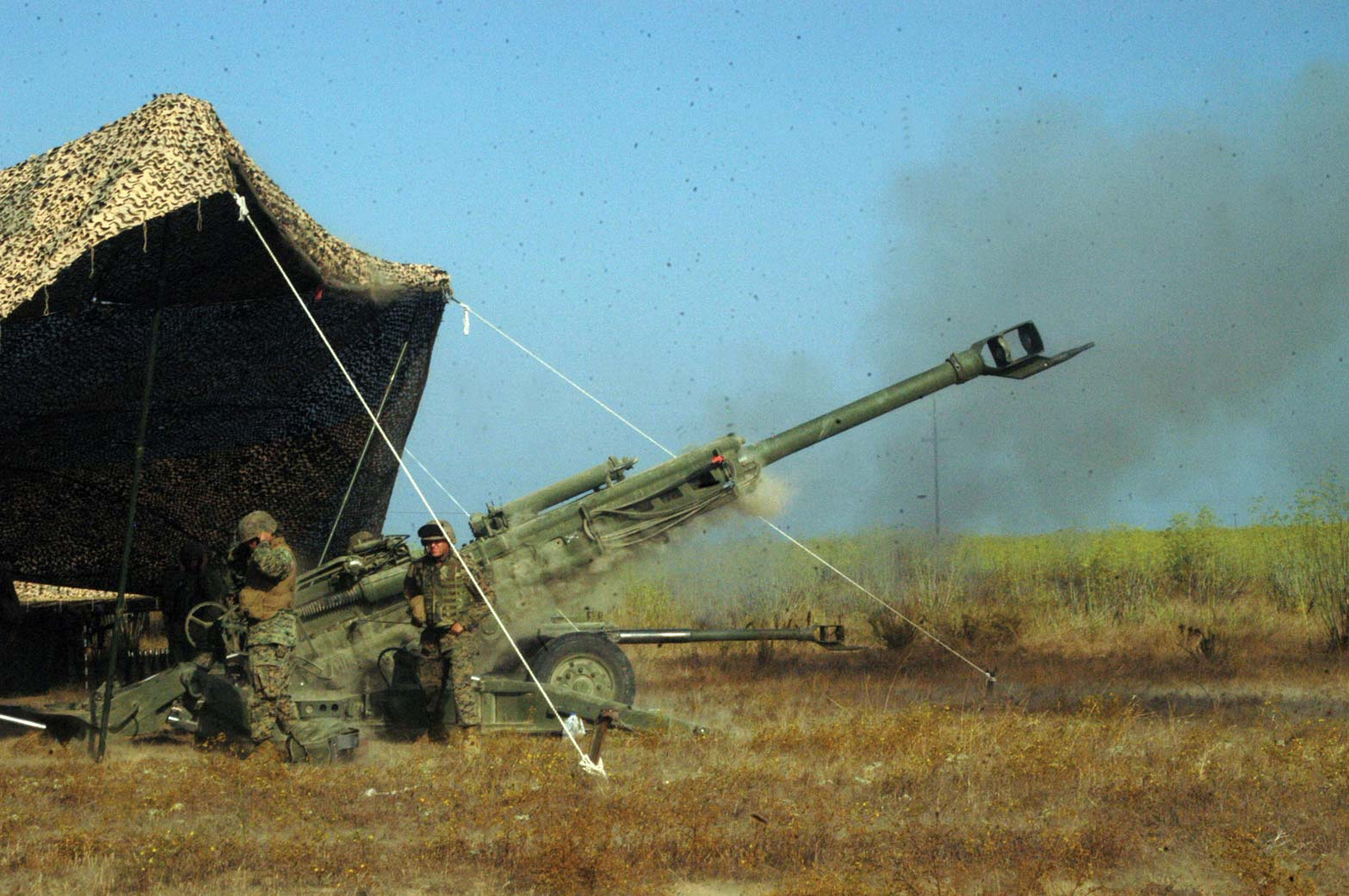
Marines with 2/11 send a round high into the air with the new M777 howitzer.

The battalion was activated November 5, 1918, at Montierchame, France, as the 2d Battalion, 11th Regiment. They were relocated during July–August 1919 to Hampton Roads, Virginia, and were deactivated August 11, 1919.

=== 1927–1929 ===
2/11 was reactivated on May 9, 1927, at Marine Corps Base Quantico, Virginia, as the 2d Battalion, 11th Regiment. Deployed during May 1927 to Chinandega, Nicaragua, and assigned to the 2d Brigade. They participated in operations against dissidents in May–July 1927. They were redesignated July 1, 1927, as the 2d Separate Battalion, 11th Regiment, and relocated to San Diego, California. The battalion was deactivated September 10, 1927. They were again reactivated on January 5, 1928, at San Diego, California, as the 2d Battalion, 11th Regiment. The battalion deployed during January 1928 to Corinto, Nicaragua, and assigned to the 2d Brigade. They were deactivated August 20, 1929, on board the USS Henderson while en route to the United States.

=== World War II ===
2/11 was again reactivated on January 1, 1941, at Guantanamo Bay, Cuba, as the 2d Battalion, 11th Marines, 1st Brigade. Relocated during April 1941 to Parris Island, South Carolina. They deployed during June 1942 to Wellington, New Zealand. The battalion participated in the following World War II battles: Battle of Guadalcanal, Finschhafen, Battle of New Britain, Battle of Peleliu and the Battle of Okinawa. They redeployed during September 1945 to Tientsin, China, and participated in the occupation of Northern China from September 1945 to December 1946.

They were reassigned during January 1947 to the Fleet Marine Force and redeployed during January – February 1947 to Guam. Relocated during April–May 1947 they moved to Marine Corps Base Camp Pendleton, California, and were reassigned to the 3rd Marine Brigade. They were again reassigned during July 1947 to the 1st Marine Division and relocated during August 1947 to Marine Corps Logistics Base Barstow, California. 2/11 was deactivated on September 28, 1947.

=== 1950–1965 ===
The battalion was reactivated on August 7, 1950, at Camp Pendleton as the 2nd Battalion, 11th Marines, 1st Marine Division, and deployed during August–September 1950 to Kobe, Japan. They participated in the Korean War, operating at Inchon-Seoul, the Chosin Reservoir, East Central front, Western front. They were stationed at the Korean Demilitarized Zone from July 1953-March 1955 and finally relocated during March 1955 to Camp Pendleton, California.

=== Vietnam War ===
2/11 deployed during February–March 1966 to Camp Hansen, Okinawa. They again redeployed during May 1966 to Republic of Vietnam and participated in the Vietnam War from March 1966 to March 1971, operating from Chu Lai, Tam Ky, Hue/Phu Bai, Thon Back Thack, Cao Doi and An Hoa. They returned in March–April 1971 to Camp Pendleton, California.

=== The Gulf War ===
Deployed during December 1990 with Regimental Landing Team 5, 5th Marine Expeditionary Brigade to Southwest Asia. They participated in the defense of Saudi Arabia until January 1991 and proceeded to participate in the liberation of Kuwait in January–May 1991 operating in Um Guar Al-Juba, Al Wafrah. Following the war they took part in the Bangladesh relief effort Operation Sea Angel in May 1991. The battalion returned on June 29, 1991, to Camp Pendleton, California, and was last the Gulf War combat unit to return stateside.

1998- Battery F was attached to 31st MEU(SOC) BLT 2/4 Battery F Awarded the Armed Forces Expeditionary Medal (with Bronze star) for Combat Operations and Naval Unit Commendations (with Bronze Star), Meritirous Unit Commendation and Sea Service Deployment Ribbon.

The flexibility of the MEU was demonstrated with the Iraq crisis in late 1998 regarding the regime not complying with the U.N. weapons inspections process. All four ARG ships had just completed Exercise Foal Eagle off the coast of Korea, and were heading to various port visits for liberty, when each ship received the call in early Nov 1998 to sail immediately to Okinawa to onload the 31st MEU.

A significant portion of the 31st MEU’s 2000 Marines were engaged in urban warfare training in Guam when their message to return to Okinawa came in November. The rest were still in Okinawa, but approximately a quarter of those were a new infantry battalion, just rotating in from California. The battalion had just two days to gather all their personnel to get ready to deploy.

The 31st MEU and ships' company personnel started their initial onloads to the ships on 9 Nov and completed the morning of 11 Nov. In one night alone, they loaded more than 170 pallets of equipment, weapons, and cargo. In addition, a C-5 Galaxy from Marine Corps Air Station El Toro, originally scheduled to bring maintenance supplies and tools to Okinawa two weeks later, arrived early on 10 Nov 1998 in order to restock the MEU’s Air Combat Element. This evolution was a part of the normal supply rotation, but the shipment arrived a week early – just in time to load onto the ships before they departed.

From Nov 1998 to Feb 1999, the MEU participated in operations in the Persian Gulf and off the coast of Kuwait, including Operation Southern Watch and Operation Desert Fox.

In December 1998 2/4 participated as the Battalion Landing Team (BLT) for the 31 Marine Expeditionary Unit Special Operations Capable (MEUSOC). The operation, named "Desert Fox", was a retaliation to Saddam Hussein's refusal to comply with U.N. Security Council Resolutions that led to a coalition air bombing campaign. The Marines of 2/4 were also set up in a defense at and around Muttla ridge, in Kuwait, to act as a deterrent for any Iraqi attack on Kuwait that might have followed the air campaign.

Operation Continue Hope 1993-1994

Golf Battery deployed January 1994 with the 11th Marine Expeditionary Unit / Special Operations Capable (11th MEUSOC) supporting Battalion Landing Team 2nd Battalion 5th Marines. Golf Battery was mainly aboard the LSD -36 USS Anchorage and landed on the beaches of Somalia via LCACs in participation and support of the amphibious withdrawal of US forces in Mogadishu, Somalia which occurred on 25 March 1994.

Operation Continue Hope, Operation Quick Draw, Operation Distant Runner.

==== Operation Iraqi Freedom ====
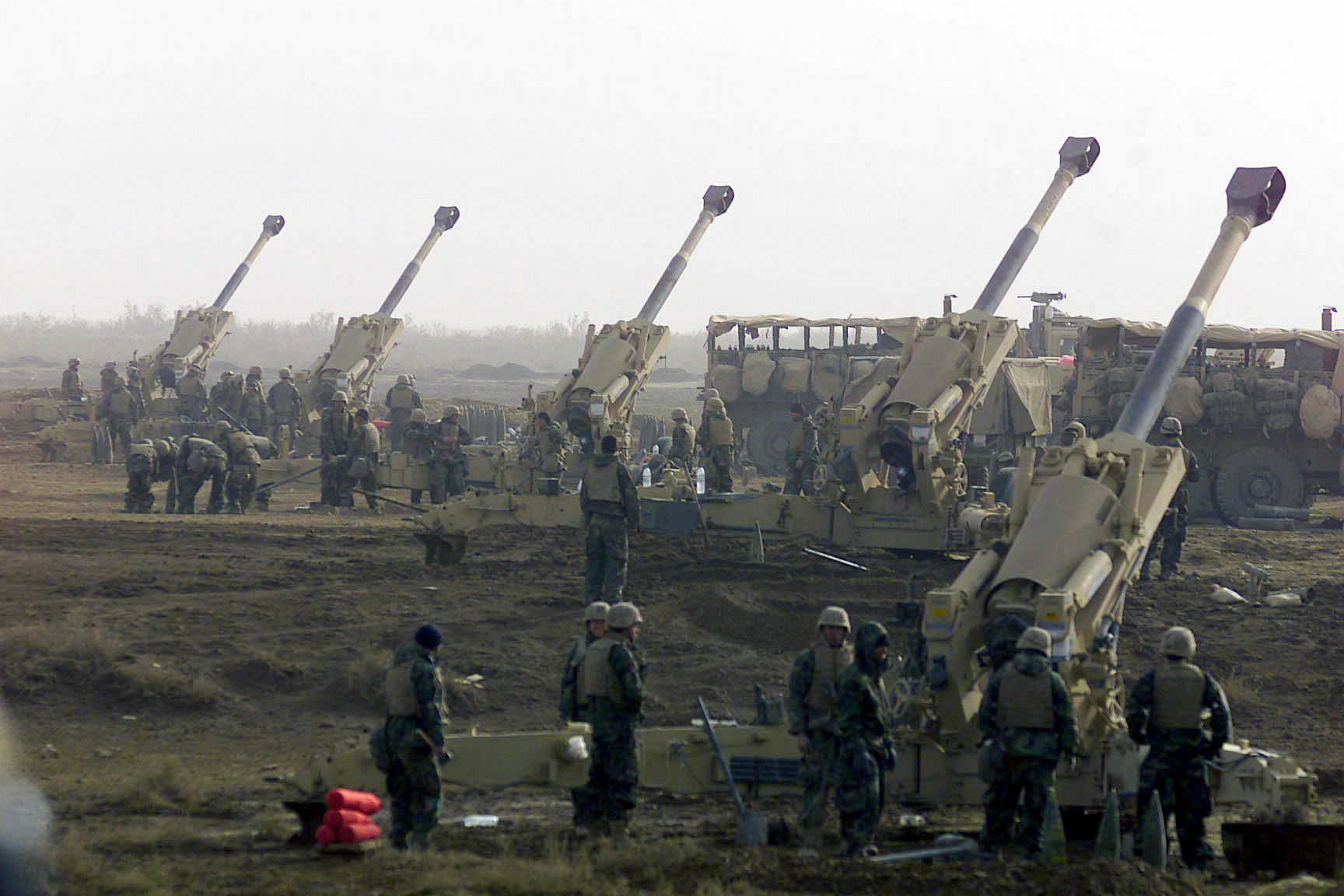
I Battery with RCT-5 in Iraq

2/11 deployed during January 2003 with the 1st Marine Division to Kuwait. They participated in the 2003 invasion of Iraq as part of Regimental Combat Team 5. 2/11 fired tens of thousands of artillery rounds throughout the war. Destroying all buildings, vehicles, and personnel that were in their way. 2/11 were Amongst the ranks of the U.S forces Striking fear into Saddam Hussein, having him offer cash prizes for Iraqi’s who down "enemy" planes and kill or capture invading U.S artillery or troops. Fox Btry (Fury5) had encounter intense firefights with enemy combatants during their push up north, earning Fox battery the Combat Action Ribbon during OIF. The battalion relocated during back to Camp Pendleton, California, in August 2003. In August 2004, the battalion again deployed in support of OIF and operated as a provisional military police with the 1st Marine Division in Ramadi, Iraq. They returned to Camp Pendleton in March 2005. From then to September 2007, individual batteries continued to deploy as both traditional artillery and provisional military police throughout Al Anbar.

From February 2008 through February 2009 the battalion deployed as civil affairs unit to areas of Fallujah, Ramadi and far western Al Anbar Province.

==== Operation Enduring Freedom ====
2/11 deployed to Helmand Province, Afghanistan, in 2011 to support border security operations as part of Task Force Leatherneck operating out of Camp Leatherneck Golf Battery 2/11 operated as a provisional rifle company based at FOB outpost Zebrugee at Kajaki dam. 2/11 Golf engaged enemy forces pushed north during Operation Eastern Storm in Helmand Province. During deployment 2/11 Golf accurately engaged a target with an Excalibur GPS guided round in excess of 25 miles, a current record.

==== Marine Expeditionary Unit ====
2/11 Golf Battery deployed on the 31st MEU in 2013 with BLT 2/5

== Awards ==
- Presidential Unit Citation Streamer with one silver and four Bronze Stars
  - World War II
    - Battle of Guadalcanal – 1942
    - Battle of Peleliu, Ngesebus – 1944
    - Battle of Okinawa – 1945
  - Korean War
    - 1950, 1950, 1957
  - Vietnam War
    - 1966, 1966–1967, 1967–1968
  - Operation Iraqi Freedom – 2003
- Navy Unit Commendation Streamer with three Bronze Stars
  - World War II
    - Cape Gloucester – 1943–1944
  - Korea
    - 1952-1953
  - Southwest Asia
    - 1990-1991
  - OIF 2-2
    - 2003-2004
- Meritorious Unit Commendation Streamer with one Bronze Star
  - Vietnam
    - 1968, 1994
- World War I Victory Streamer
- Second Nicaraguan Campaign Streamer
- American Defense Service Streamer with one Bronze Star
- Asiatic-Pacific Campaign Streamer with one Silver and one Bronze Star
- World War II Victory Streamer
- Navy Occupation Service Streamer with "ASIA"
- China Service Streamer
- National Defense Service Streamer with two Bronze Stars
- Korean Service Streamer with two Silver Stars
- Armed Forces Expeditionary Streamer
- Vietnam Service Streamer with two Silver and two Bronze Stars
- Southwest Asia Service Streamer with two Bronze stars
- Korean Presidential Unit Citation Streamer
- Vietnam Cross of Gallantry with Palm Streamer
- Vietnam Meritorious Unit Commendation Civil Actions Streamer

== See also ==
- List of United States Marine Corps battalions
- Organization of the United States Marine Corps
