= Albu Nasir =

Village in Al Anbar Governate, Iraq

Coordinates: 33°25′N 43°28′E

Albu Nasir is a village in Iraq, which is located in the Al Anbar Governorate north west of the city of Fallujah and east of Ramadi, on a loop of the river Euphrates. To the north lies Albu Bali, to the east Baaran and the Khalidiya Island area. To the south the town of Khalidiya is located.

In 2015/16, during clashes in the area and following Anbar offensive, there was intense fighting in the area between the Iraqi army and ISIL militants. On 4 January 2015, it was reported that Albu Nasir was recaptured from ISIL by Iraqi forces.
