= Al-Nasiriyah Teaching Hospital =

- Dhi Qar Health Directorate

Geography
- Location: Nasiriyah, Dhi Qar Governorate, Iraq

Organisation
- Care system: Public
- Type: Teaching

Services
- Beds: 492

History
- Opened: 12 June 2021

Links
- Lists: Hospitals in Iraq

Al-Nasiriyah Teaching Hospital (Arabic: مستشفى الناصرية التعليمي) is a public teaching hospital in Nasiriyah, the capital of Dhi Qar Governorate, southern Iraq. The hospital operates within the Iraqi public health system and is associated with the Dhi Qar Health Directorate. It has been described by the Iraqi Ministry of Health and sources reporting on its management contract as a 492-bed hospital.

== History ==
The hospital was inaugurated on 12 June 2021 by Iraqi prime minister Mustafa Al-Kadhimi. Contemporary reporting described it as a training and research hospital constructed by a Turkish company in Nasiriyah, with a capacity of approximately 500 beds.

Following its inauguration, the hospital began operating its services progressively. It later developed into a general teaching hospital providing inpatient, outpatient, diagnostic, surgical and emergency services to patients from Dhi Qar Governorate.

In April 2024, the Iraqi Ministry of Health signed an agreement with Elegancia Healthcare, a subsidiary of the Qatar-based Estithmar Holding, for the management, operation and maintenance of the hospital. The agreement identified the facility as a 492-bed hospital and included plans to improve its operational systems, expand medical specialties and provide technical and administrative support.

Preparatory work for the transfer of hospital operations took place during the second half of 2024. According to the operating company, this included infrastructure work, recruitment of medical and administrative staff and updates to hospital systems and regulations. In January 2025, the Iraqi Minister of Health visited the hospital to review the new management arrangements and operational plans.

The Iraqi Ministry of Health continued to monitor the hospital's operation under its modern hospital-management programme during 2025.

== Facilities and services ==
The hospital has been reported as containing 19 medical departments and specialist clinics. Services reported by the Dhi Qar Health Directorate include general and specialist surgery, emergency care, internal medicine, orthopaedics, diagnostic imaging, laboratory services, outpatient consultations and oncology care.

The hospital includes an oncology and radiotherapy centre. The Dhi Qar Health Directorate has reported the provision of radiotherapy sessions through this centre. The hospital also provides emergency, surgical, radiology and laboratory services, with the health directorate publishing periodic statistics on patient visits, surgical procedures and diagnostic examinations.

The hospital is used as a clinical research setting and as an institutional affiliation in medical publications. One prospective observational study conducted at the hospital examined the predictive performance of the STOP-BANG questionnaire for difficult airway management in Iraqi adults undergoing elective surgery.

== Management ==
The hospital forms part of the public healthcare system administered through the Dhi Qar Health Directorate and the Iraqi Ministry of Health. Under the management agreement announced in 2024, its operations were assigned to a healthcare subsidiary of Estithmar Holding while the hospital remained part of Iraq's government health sector.

The Iraqi government also included Al-Nasiriyah Teaching Hospital among several major hospitals covered by contracts for professional management and operation. Government decisions in 2024 referred to the hospital as a 492-bed facility.

== See also ==
- Healthcare in Iraq
- List of hospitals in Iraq
- Nasiriyah
- Dhi Qar Governorate
