= Albu Ubeid =

Village in Iraq

- Village
- Interactive map of Albu Ubeid
- Location in Iraq
- Coordinates: 33°23′4″N 43°31′31″E
- Country: Iraq
- Governorate: Al Anbar
- Intense fighting during the Anbar offensive (2015–16), recaptured by Iraqi forces in August 2016

Albu Ubeid (also: Albou Ubeid, Albou 'Ubeid, Albu 'Ubayd, Albu Obeid) is a village in Iraq, which is located in the Al Anbar Governorate north west of the city of Fallujah and east of Ramadi, on the river Euphrates. To the east lies Albu Bali, to the south Juwaybah. To the west lies Albu Aitha.

In 2016, during the Anbar offensive, there was intense fighting in the area between the Iraqi army and ISIL militants. In August 2016, it was recaptured by Iraqi forces.
