= Mustafa Saadoon =

Mustafa Saadoon may refer to:

- Mustafa Saadoon (footballer, born 1994) (1994–2021), Iraqi football goalkeeper
- Mustafa Saadoon (footballer, born 2001), Iraqi football right back
