= Umm al-Tabul Mosque =

Mosque in Baghdad, Iraq

- Arabic: جامع أم الطبول
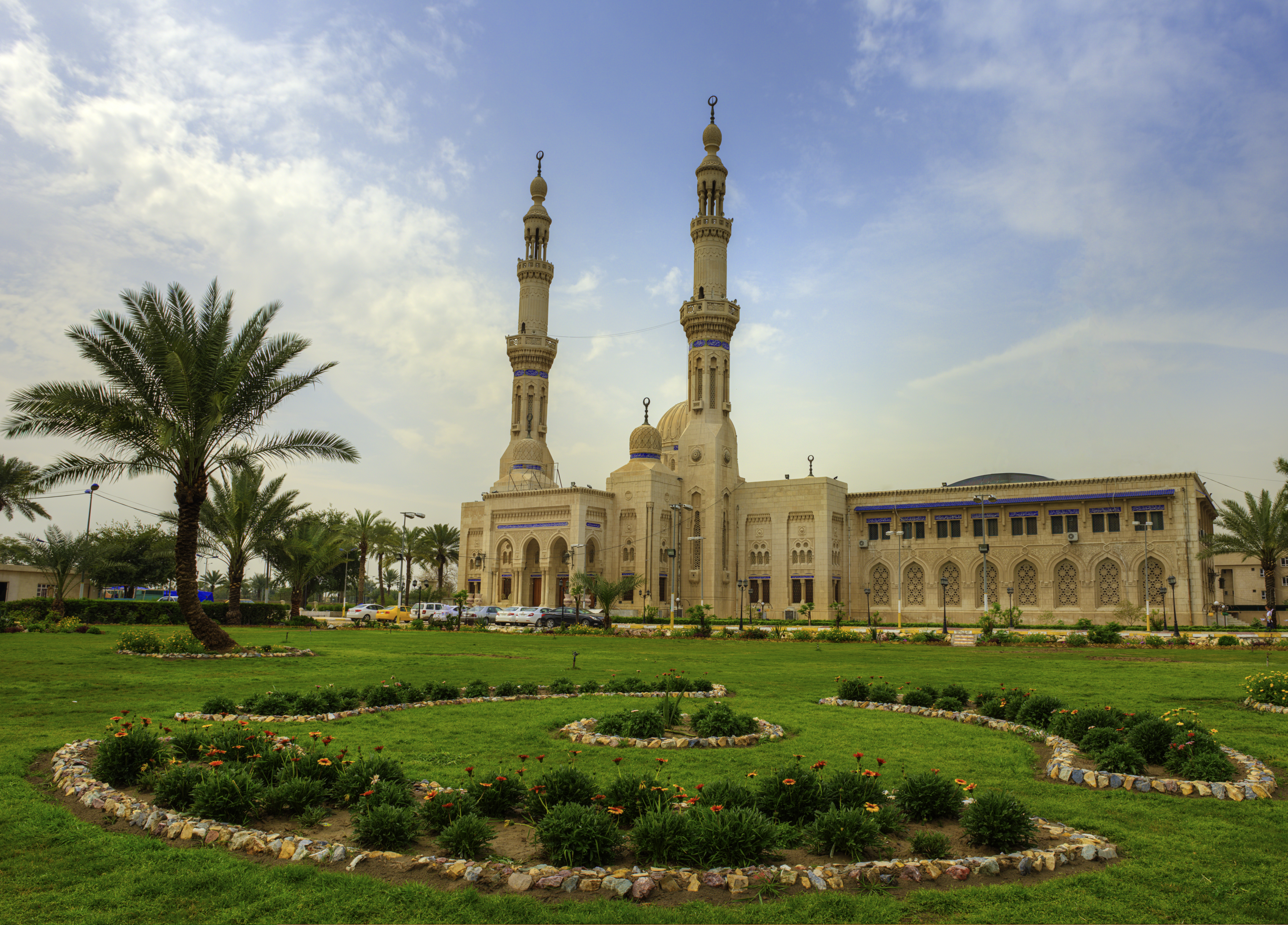
- The mosque in 2016

- Location of the mosque in Baghdad

Religion
- Affiliation: Islam
- Ecclesiastical or organizational status: Mosque
- Governing body: Sunni Endowment Office
- Status: Active

Location
- Location: Baghdad, Baghdad Governorate
- Country: Iraq
- Interactive map of Umm al-Tabul Mosque
- Coordinates: 33°17′13″N 44°20′39″E

Architecture
- Type: Mosque architecture
- Style: Egyptian Islamic
- Founder: Iraqi Council of Ministers
- Groundbreaking: July 16, 1964
- Completed: September 20, 1978

Specifications
- Capacity: 1,500 worshipers
- Length: 100 m (330 ft)
- Width: 50 m (160 ft)
- Interior area: 15,000 m^{2} (160,000 sq ft)
- Dome: Five
- Minaret: Two
- Minaret height: 40 m (130 ft)
- Materials: White marble

The Umm al-Tabul Mosque (Arabic: جامع أم الطبول, romanized: Jami' Umm al-Tabul) is a large mosque located in the Yarmouk neighborhood of Baghdad, in the Baghdad Governorate of Iraq. Built in commemoration of the officers participating in the 1959 Mosul uprising, the mosque is notable for its unique architecture which takes inspiration from Egyptian Islamic architecture, specifically the Citadel of Saladin in Cairo. It is one of the closest mosques to the Baghdad International Airport.

== History ==
=== Planning and construction ===
Before the construction of the mosque, the area used to be an arena outside of Baghdad for training army personnel in shooting. In 1963 as the city was expanding, the Iraqi Council of Ministers authorized the Minister of Municipalities at that time, Mahmud Sheet, in a letter, with the consent to prepare designs and present them to the Council of Ministers and to form a committee headed by the Minister of Municipalities and a representative of the Ministry of Defense and many other Iraqi ministries to supervise implementation of a new neighborhood in the area.

Engineer Abd al-Salam Ahmed was brought in to design the mosque which was based on the Citadel of Saladin in Cairo and was intended to be larger in size. Maps of the area were drawn by artist Arsham George. Iraqi calligrapher Hashem Muhammad al-Baghdadi had also helped make the calligraphy for the mosque. The foundation stone was laid on July 16, 1964, and it was inaugurated on September 20, 1978. The mosque cost 700 thousand dinars and some believe that the wife of the Iraqi Maqam singer, Muhammad al-Qubanchi, helped bear the cost of the mosque's constriction. Three houses were also prepared next to the mosque for the employees. Additionally, the remains of the Free Officers who participated in the 1958 Mosul uprising were also transferred from their former tombs in al-Ghazali to the new tombs of the Umm al-Tabul Mosque.

=== Post establishment and later events ===
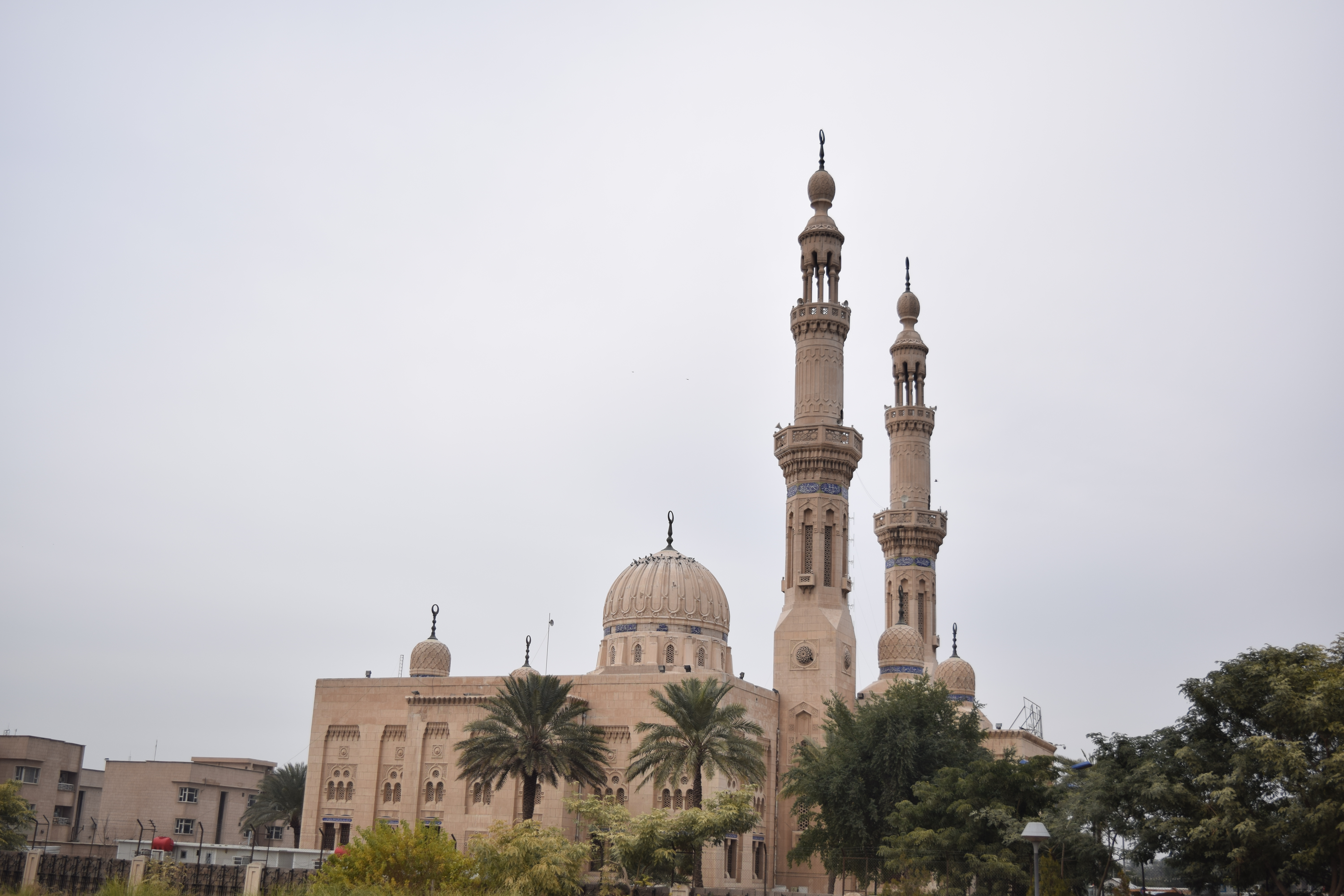
As seen from ground level.

After the mosque's establishment, it not only became a place for worshipping but also a tourist attraction, receiving many foreign tourists and researchers. Many delegations, including Indonesian, Egyptian, and European ones, had visited the mosque before to see the art of modern Islamic architecture and write research on it. The Mosque was included in the 1982 official Iraqi Tourist Guide as a notable landmark with significant architecture recommended for tourists to visit. Albeit the mosque was referred to as the "Martyr's Mosque."

During the US-led invasion of Iraq, American forces stormed the mosque without consent in order to arrest the imam and preacher of the mosque, Mahdi al-Sumaidaie, who was suspected by the American troops due to being a Salafist. The American troops reportedly also tampered with and teared up the Qurans in the mosque as well as throwing them on the ground, as well as smashing the doors of the mosque. The American Command denied the allegations. This event, as well as the unofficial renaming of the mosque to "Ibn Taymiyyah Mosque" by Salafists without the consent of the Sunni Endowment Office, caused a large demonstration which included Sunni Muslims. Protestors reportedly shouted anti-American sentiments.

Due to the Iraq War and the rise of ISIS in the country, millions of Iraqis were displaced from their homes. Many fled into Baghdad and the Umm al-Tabul Mosque saw many of these fleeing into crowded makeshift fabric shelters around the mosque since January 2014, including some refugees from Mosul and areas around the Syrian border. The officials of the mosque estimated that 120 families have moved around the mosque as of 2016.

In 2019, concrete blocks that were put during the Iraq War around the mosque were removed as ordered by the mayor of Baghdad. The area, which has been closed for years, was also cleaned up. The mosque was also once visited by Iranian general Qasem Soleimani.

== Description and architecture ==
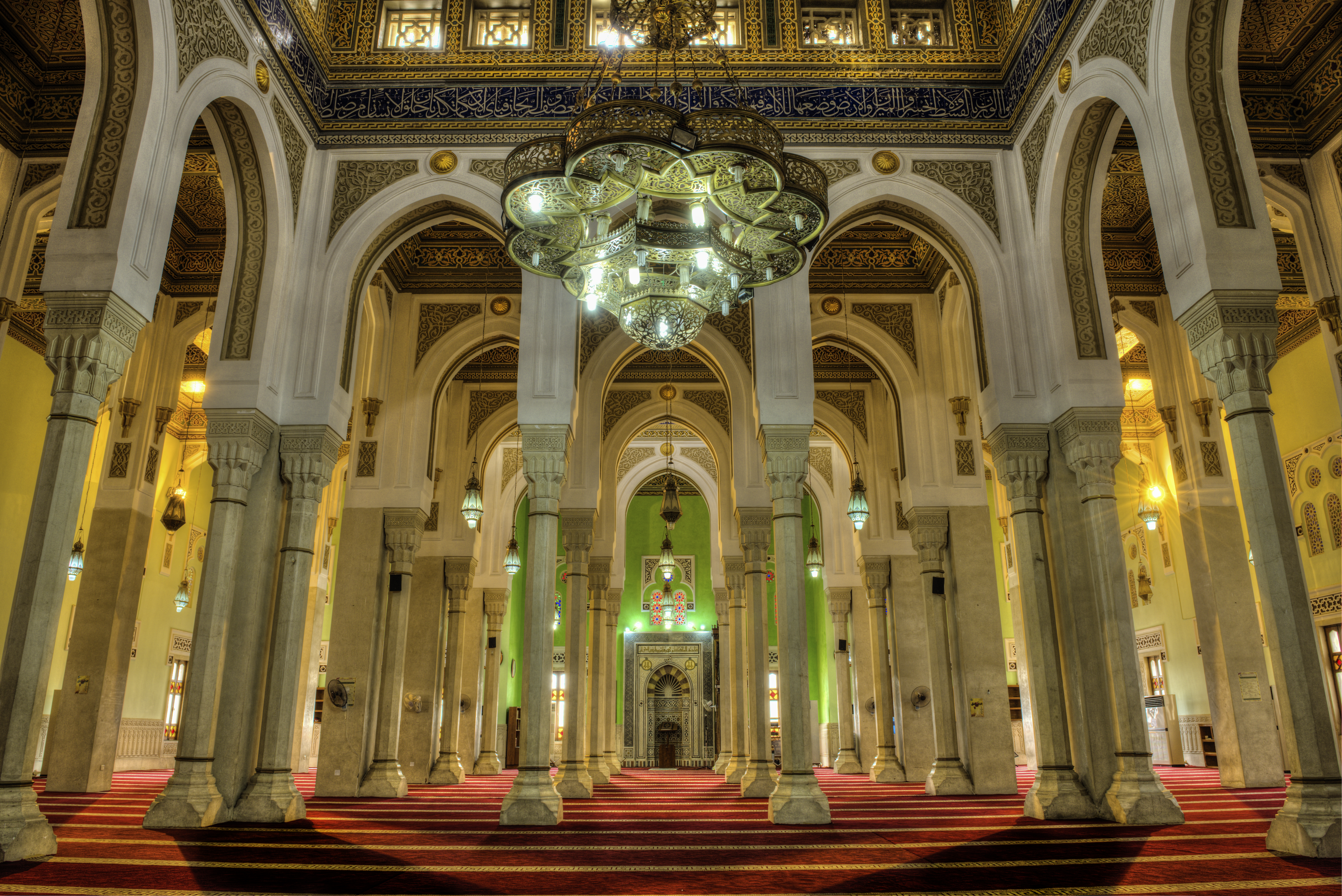
The interior of the mosque.

The area of the Umm al-Tabul Mosque is approximately 15,000 square metres (160,000 sq ft) and can accommodate approximately 1,500 worshipers. The campus around the mosque rises 1.5 metres (4 ft 11 in) above the ground with a wide staircase made of white marble. The main entrance area includes marble columns and luxurious chandeliers with verses of Surat Ya-Sin written on the stone. Above the main entrance are two minarets, each of which is 40 metres (130 ft) highg. The sanctuary of the mosque is rectangular in shape and is 100 metres (330 ft) long and 50 metres (160 ft) wide. Behind is a place for ablution and utilities. The mosque is mediated by 98 arched columns of white marble, and between the columns are several chandeliers. The ceiling contains inscriptions and writings engraved by the hands of Egyptian workers who were brought to help in the construction effort. The interior contains a mihrab and a pulpit made from Egyptian material and a large dome made of marble tops the mosque with other smaller domes around it. The interior also includes bands of verses of Surat ar-Rahman and Ayat al-Kursi written in the handwriting of Hashem Muhammad al-Baghdadi. The mosque contains many chapels, including ones for summer and for women. There are also rooms for the imam and the preacher of the mosque.

== See also ==
- Islam in Iraq
- List of mosques in Baghdad
