= Malahameh =

Coordinates: 33.4166°N 43.55°E

Malahameh is a village in Iraq, which is located in the Al Anbar Governorate north west of the city of Fallujah, north of Habbaniyah and river Euphrates, and north west of Albu Shejel. West of Malahameh lies Khalidiya Island.

It is not to be confused with Malahma, which is located south of Malahameh.
