= Malahma =

Malahma (also: al-Malahma) is a village in Iraq, which is located in the Al Anbar Governorate north west of the city of Fallujah, north of Habbaniyah and river Euphrates, and west of Albu Shejel. West of Malahma lies Khalidiya Island.

It is not to be confused with Malahameh, which is located north of Malahma.

In March 2004, five U.S. soldiers were killed by a roadside bomb in Malahma during the Iraq War.

In September 2015, 20 ISIL fighters were killed by coalition bombardment in the Malahma area.
