= Albu Bali =

Coordinates: 33.440578°N 43.475515°E

Albu Bali is a village in Iraq, which is located in the Al Anbar Governorate north west of the city of Fallujah and east of Ramadi, on a loop of the river Euphrates. The surrounding area is referred to as Albu Bali area. To the east lies Khalidiya Island, to the south the village of Albu Nasir. To the west lies Albu Ubeid.

== History ==
During the Iraq War, in 2007, Operation Forsythe Park was carried out in the area. In 2016, during the Anbar offensive, there was intense fighting in the area between the Iraqi army and ISIL militants. On 4 June, it was reported that 14 ISIL militants were killed and eight booby-trapped vehicles destroyed in the wasteland north of the area. The village was recaptured by August 2016 during an offensive by Iraqi Army in the Khalidiya Island.
