= Yarmouk Hospital =

Al-Yarmouk Teaching Hospital مستشفى اليرموك التعليمي

Geography
- Location: Jinub Street, Baghdad, Al-Karkh, Al-Yarmouk, Iraq
- Coordinates: 33.294120°N 44.352331°E

Organisation
- Type: Teaching

Services
- Emergency department: Yes
- Beds: 700

History
- Opened: 1964

Links
- Lists: Hospitals in Iraq

Al-Yarmouk Teaching Hospital is one of the Iraqi hospitals. Located in Baghdad, Al-Karkh, Al-Yarmouk city, besides Al-Mustansiriya medical college (and is considered the teaching hospital for its students). The hospital was established in 1964 and now represents the second largest Iraqi hospital after Baghdad medical city. It is also the largest emergency facility in the country. It has an emergency department and an outpatient clinic besides the medical, surgical (including orthopedics and burn units), obstetrical, oncology section and gynecological wards. ِAlso associated with the hospital highly sophisticated teaching laboratories, radiology ward, blood bank, the national center of haematology and cancer research center. Collectively with the Central Pediatric Teaching Hospital run by Yarmouk Directorate of Health. The hospital has about 700 beds.

The hospital focused on victims of violence due to war during the 2003-2011 Iraq War, and was one of only five hospitals in Baghdad able to treat war wounded. In 2003 during the American offensive on Baghdad, a tank shell destroyed the generator of the hospital.

== In culture ==
- In 2006, Baghdad: A doctor's story, a BBC documentary of life in the hospital during the 2006-2007 sectarian civil war was filmed and aired.
- Journalist Dahr Jamail's contacts in the hospital during the Iraq War play an important role in his memoir, Beyond the Green Zone: Dispatches from an Unembedded Journalist in Occupied Iraq
