= Ibn Sina Hospital =

Ibn Sina Hospital مستشفى إبن سينا
- Iraq Ministry of Health
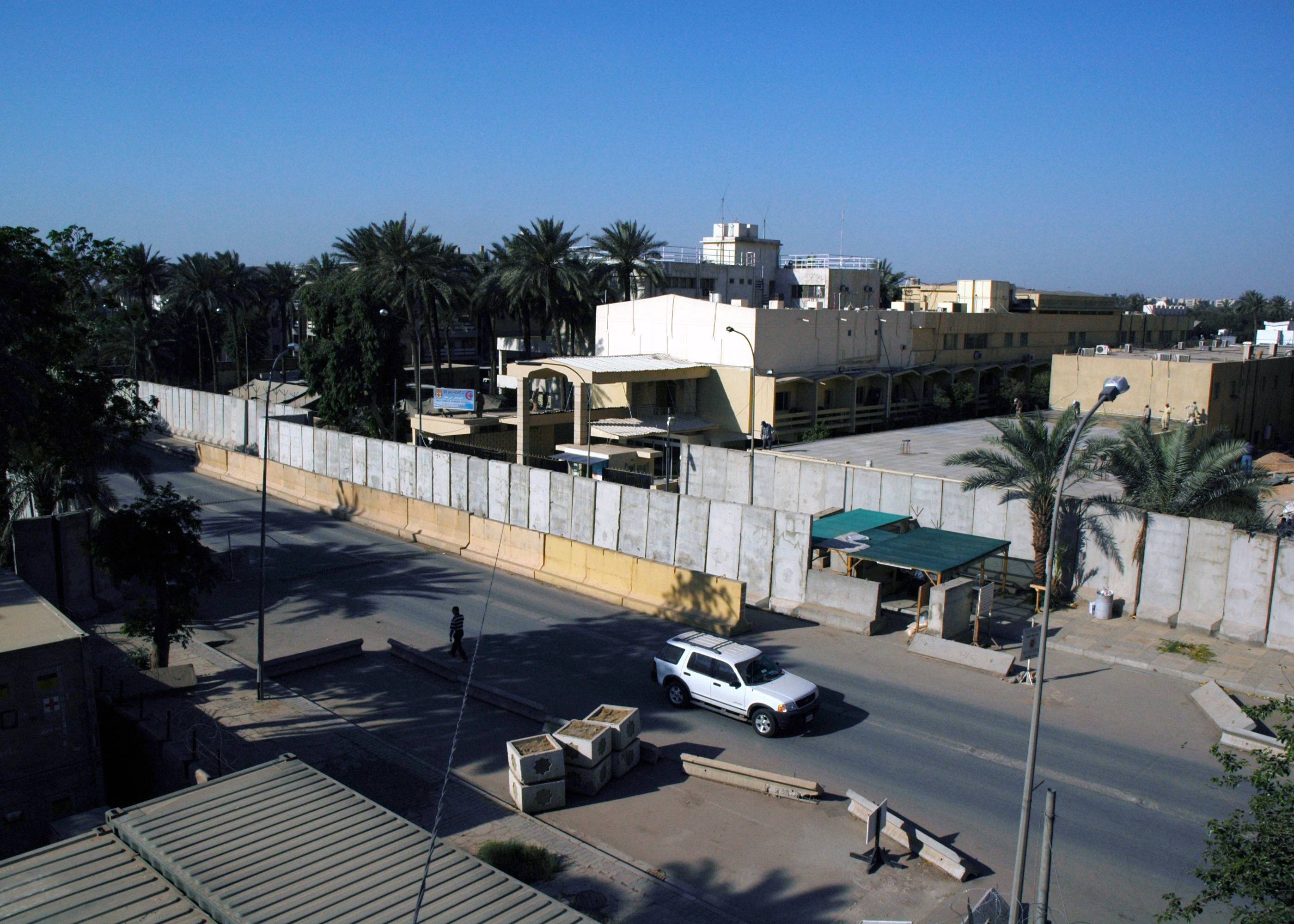
- Ibn Sina Hospital during Operation Iraqi Freedom

Geography
- Location: Baghdad, Iraq
- Coordinates: 33.310654°N 44.404968°E

Organisation
- Type: Teaching

History
- Opened: 1964

Links
- Lists: Hospitals in Iraq

Ibn Sina Hospital is a hospital in Baghdad, Iraq which was opened by four Iraqi doctors – Modafar Al Shather, Kadim Shubar, Kasim Abdul Majeed and Clement Serkis – in 1964. It was purchased for a fraction of its true value by the Iraqi government for use by Saddam Hussein, his family and the Baath Party elite. Uday Hussein was hospitalized there after being wounded in a failed assassination attempt in 1997.

== History ==
The Ibn Sina Hospital in Baghdad was named for the Persian physician Ibn Sina (also known as Avicenna). It was established by four Iraqi physicians in 1964 and became one of the best hospitals in Baghdad. It was seized by Saddam Hussein in 1974 for his own personal and family use.

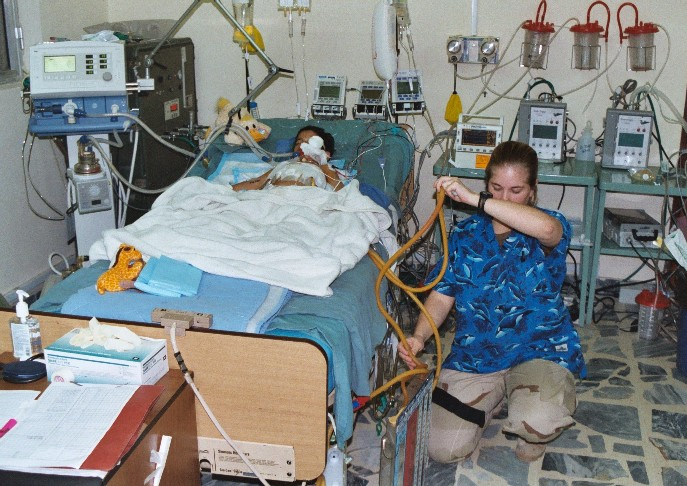
U.S. Army Nurse at the bedside of a young Iraqi boy injured in a roadside blast in Sadr City. Intensive Care Unit, Ibn Sina Hospital, Baghdad, Iraq (April 2004)

During Operation Iraqi Freedom, the hospital was situated in Baghdad's International Zone and was run by the United States Armed Forces from shortly after the downfall of Saddam Hussein in 2003 until 30 September 2009. The hospital was staffed mainly by the US Army and its rotating Combat Support Hospital units as an emergency facility for critically wounded soldiers and civilians, including suspected and confessed insurgents. During the period of US administration of the Ibn Sina, the emergency room saw an average of 300 trauma cases per month.

On 1 October 2009, the hospital was officially handed back to the Government of Iraq as part of the US military drawdown from Baghdad.

The Ibn Sina was made famous through the widely viewed HBO documentary Baghdad ER, which featured the 86th Combat Support Hospital based out of Fort Campbell, Kentucky, home of the 101st Airborne Division (Air Assault), and was one of several Army hospital units to staff the hospital.

== See also ==
- Avicenne Hospital in Paris
