= Al-Mustafa Army in Iraq =

- جيش المصطفى في العراق
- Dates active: 2005–2009
- Dissolved: 2009
- Allegiance: Al-Jama'a al-Islamiyya
- Ideology: Salafi Jihadism

Al-Mustafa Army in Iraq (Arabic: جيش المصطفى في العراق, romanized: Jaysh al-Muṣṭafá fī al-ʻIrāq) was an Iraqi insurgent group during the Iraqi insurgency.

== Attacks and threats ==
In March 2005, Al-Mustafa Army (Under the name of Al-Qaeda in Iraq) claimed responsibility for a car bombing in the neighborhood of Bab al-Mu’adham, Iraq. Then in April 2008, openly called war on the Islamic State of Iraq after some back and forth with the organization. In June 2009, Al-Mustafa threatened Obama after making a speech in Egypt.
