= Healthcare in Iraq =

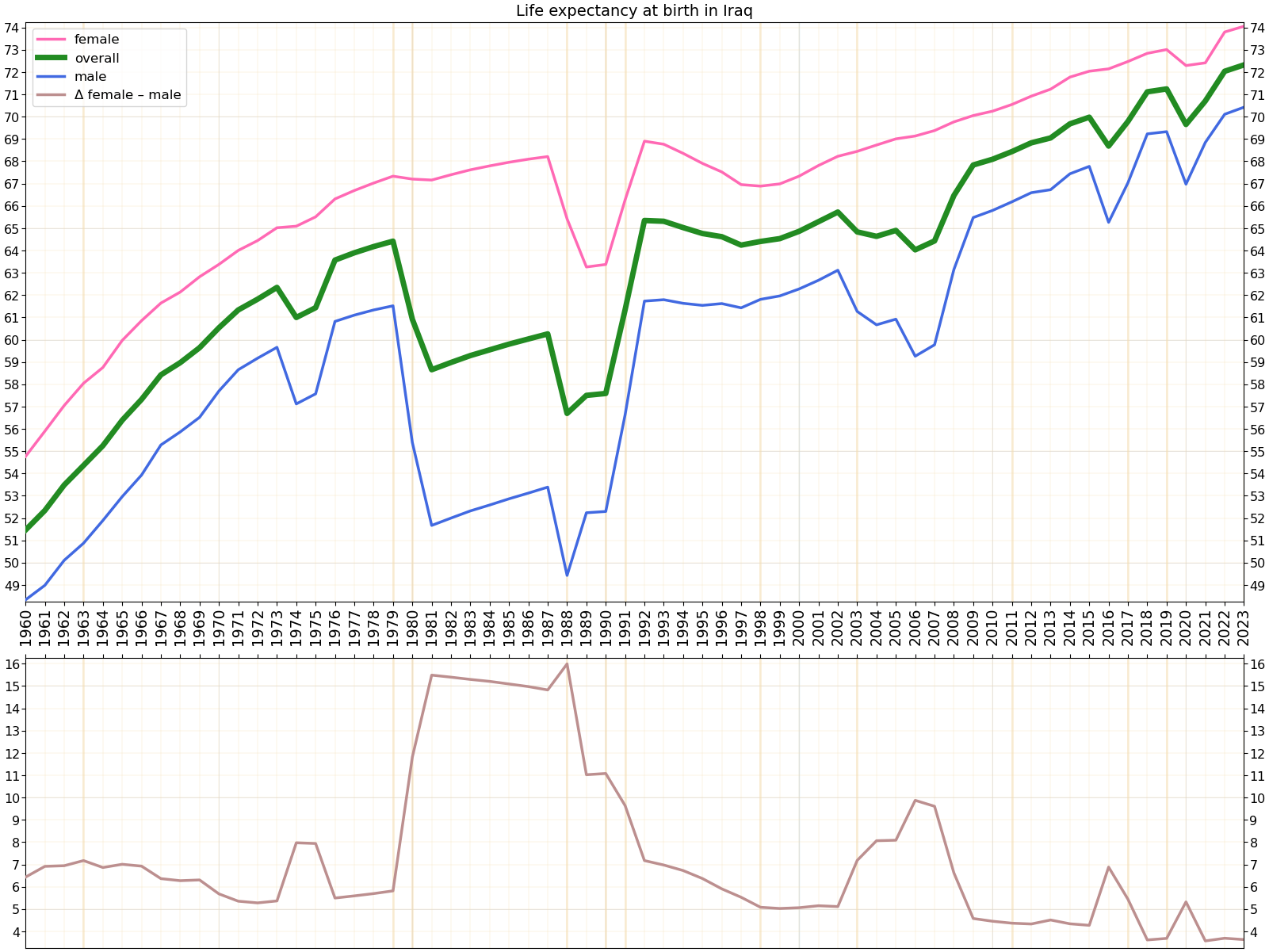
Development of life expectancy in Iraq

Iraq had developed a centralized free and universal healthcare system in the 1970s using a hospital based, capital-intensive model of curative care. The country depended on large-scale imports of medicines, medical equipment and even nurses, paid for with oil export income, according to a "Watching Brief" report issued jointly by the UNICEF and the World Health Organization in July 2003. Unlike other poorer countries, which focused on mass health care using primary care practitioners, Iraq developed a Westernized system of sophisticated hospitals with advanced medical procedures, provided by specialist physicians. The UNICEF/WHO report noted that prior to 1990, 97 percent of the urban dwellers and 71 percent of the rural population had access to free primary health care; just 2 percent of hospital beds were privately managed.

== Funding and fees ==
During the last decade of Saddam Hussein's regime, the United Nations imposed sanctions on Iraq, which greatly limited the importation of medicine and medical equipment into Iraq, with some Iraqi hospitals unable to even hand out basic anti-biotics. During that period, maternal mortality increased nearly threefold, and the salaries of medical personnel decreased drastically. Medical facilities, which in 1980 were among the best in the Middle East, deteriorated. Conditions were especially serious in the south, where malnutrition and water-borne diseases became common in the 1990s. In 2005 the incidence of typhoid, cholera, malaria, and tuberculosis was higher in Iraq than in comparable countries. The conflict of 2003 destroyed an estimated 12 percent of hospitals and Iraq's two main public health laboratories. In 2004 some improvements occurred. Using substantial international funds, some 240 hospitals and 1,200 primary health centers were operating, shortages of some medical materials had been alleviated, the training of medical personnel had begun, and the inoculation of children was widespread. However, sanitary conditions in hospitals remained unsatisfactory, trained personnel and medications were in short supply, and health care remained largely unavailable in regions where violent insurgency continued. In 2005 there were 15 hospital beds, 6.3 doctors, and 11 nurses per 10,000 population. Plans called for US$1.5 billion of the national budget to be spent on health care in 2006.

During the 1980s, Iraqi Healthcare had been free, but as sanctions crippled Iraq, it was changed, with 500 Dinars being the admission fee into public hospitals. This was supposed to cover the cost of all treatment. In February 2016 all public hospitals in Iraq began to charge patients for individual services. The healthcare budget for 2016 has been cut by about 25%.

== Staffing ==
More than 2000 doctors were killed between 2003 and 2014. In 2016, there were fewer than thirty cardiac surgeons left in the country. As of the year 2020, there are 372 hospitals with 53,802 beds in Iraq. The public health care system in Iraq is free and has been free for decades.

== Issues ==
Iraqi doctors report that they have to pretend to resuscitate patients when this is futile because relatives, with militia connections, sometimes demand money if they are dissatisfied with the doctor's efforts. In 2010 the Council of Representatives of Iraq increased sentences for anyone convicted of threatening or attacking a doctor.

Various academic studies estimate that Iraqis have numerous untreated mental health issues, such as; depression, bipolar disorder, anxiety, post-traumatic stress disorder (PTSD alone affects between 20 and 60% of population aged 18 and above), whose cause can be traced to Saddam's human rights abuses, as well as greatly accelerating due to the aftermath of the 2003 invasion of Iraq and the overall consequences of the Iraqi War such as violence, terrorism, displacement and low socio-economic status.

== See also ==
- Health in Iraq
- List of hospitals in Iraq
- Ministry of Health (Iraq)
- List of Iraqi physicians
