= Operation Forsythe Park =

2007 military operation in Iraq

- Part of the Iraq War
Date	26 April - 5 May 2007
Location	Albu Bali, Iraq
Result	Immediate relief of insurgent, Islamic State of Iraq, and other criminal activities in the area

Belligerents
United States; Republic of Iraq	Islamic State of Iraq; Other Iraqi Insurgents

Commanders and leaders
Col. John Charlton	Unknown

Strength
450	Unknown

Casualties and losses
6 killed	Multiple killed

An Operation Forsythe Park (also: Operation Forsyth Park) in Albu Bali, located 15 kilometers northeast of Ramadi, was completed on Wednesday 5 May 2007 in Ramadi, Iraq by approx 450 Iraqi Security and Coalition Forces.

== Mission ==
Al Anbar Provincial Security Force 2, Iraqi Army demolition experts and U.S. Soldiers from 3rd Battalion, 69th Armor Regiment, 1st Brigade Combat Team, 3rd Infantry Division, Task Force Pathfinder (with elements from the 321st Engineer Battalion and C company 397th Engineer company) conducted the weeks long clearing operation, targeting one of the remaining hotspots in the brigade's area of operations. TF Pathfinder spent long hours conducting route clearance, often on mission for more than 24 hours at a time, clearing IED threats so that Provincial Security Force 2 could complete their mission.

Operation Forsythe Park started in the early morning hours of 26 April with multiple Coalition Soldiers being injured in the opening minutes of the Operation by IED's that had been emplaced in strategic areas such as land bridges over canals, with command executed detonations. One such firing point was traced out at over 600 meters and had to be dug out with a pick. This is a prime example of the insurgents having placed these devices months, even years in advance in certain areas designed to keep Coalition Forces out of the area.

"We had seen an increased amount of enemy activity in this region over the last three weeks", said Col. John Charlton, commanding officer for 1BCT. "Once we set the conditions and built sufficient combat power, we took the fight to the enemy and provided much needed relief to the population".

"During the operation, Coalition forces were attacked almost daily by rocket propelled grenades, small arms fire, IED's ranging in size from 10 pounds to 150-200 pounds of explosives. There was also the constant threat of snipers, heavy machine gun fire, and improvised rockets." Said Master Sergeant David Johnson of B Co 321st Engineer Battalion, TF Pathfinder. "We would take over for another team that had been working on clearing the roads, and we would have vehicles blown up by an IED that had been dug into the sides of the elevated roads, that left no visual clues, before we had reached the limit of advance from the previous route clearance team. Speed was a killer, 1-2 miles an hour was a good pace and the Soldiers in the lead vehicles got very good at their jobs of spotting thin copper wire, or what was referred to as a 'snail trail' in the dirt roads, or cracks in paved portions."

== Result ==
The multiple day operation marks the eighth large-scale operation for the brigade this year. The police and soldiers discovered multiple weapon caches, including 28 improvised explosive devices, three 14.5 mm anti-aircraft guns, five mortars, 300 pounds of homemade explosives, 2200 gallons of nitric acid and 200 blasting caps. Six coalition service members, several Iraqi Soldiers and police, along with multiple insurgents were killed during the operation.

== Units ==
United States Units

- 3rd Battalion, 69th Armor Regiment, 1st Brigade Combat Team, 3rd Infantry Division
- Firepower Control Team 6 (Thunder 76), Detachment F, 4th Air Naval Gunfire Liaison Company, II Marine Expeditionary Force (FWD) - Maj Ross "Speedy" Meglathery, Sgt John Fedak, Cpl Ismael Lopez, LCpl Kenny St. Cyr, LCpl Carter Allen
- Task Force Pathfinder ( 321st Engineer Battalion, C/397th Engineers)

Iraq Units

- Provincial Security Force 2, Iraqi Army
- 7th Division Iraqi Army Intelligence Surveillance and Reconnaissance Company
- 7th Division Iraqi Army Explosive Ordnance Disposal Company

== See also ==
- Islamic State of Iraq
- Operation Imposing Law
- Operation Phantom Thunder
- Operation Arrowhead Ripper
