= Nasiriyah Heart Center =

Geography
- Location: Nasiriyah, Thi Qar governorate, Iraq
- Coordinates: 31.081101°N 46.247568°E

Organisation
- Type: Specialist

Services
- Speciality: Cardiology

History
- Opened: 2013

Links
- Lists: Hospitals in Iraq

Nasiriyah Heart Center is a medical center in Nasiriyah, Thi Qar governorate, Iraq, treating heart conditions like ischemic heart diseases, congenital heart defects, and heart valvular malfunction. The facility is government-owned. It consists of 4 departments: a cardiology department, congenital heart defects department, anesthesia department, and cardiac surgery department.

The cardiac surgery department is headed by two senior surgeons, Dr. Aqeel Salman and Dr. Hussein Hashim, two registering surgeons, Dr. Rafid Hameed & Munaf Mohammed, and seven cardiothoracic residents. There is a surgical ward with a capacity of 18 beds, an intermediate ward with 6 beds, a surgical ICU, fully equipped with a capacity of 12 patients, and 4 operating rooms. The surgical department usually does valve replacement surgeries, coronary artery bypass grafting, and repair of congenital heart defects. The department also has teams that help with surgeries and staff development.

The center is a new facility that was constructed by a local company (Forth Dimension). It opened in October 2013. The building is composed of 3 floors: the ground floor contains an outpatient clinic, the congenital heart defects department, and administrative offices. The first floor has 2 wings: the northern wing contains the surgical ward, intermediate ward, ICU, and operating theaters. The southern wing contains the men's cardiology ward, CCU, and catheterization rooms. The second floor contains 2 wings as well: the northern contains doctors' residences, and the southern is divided into the women's cardiology ward and additional doctor's residences.
