= Mustafa Saadoon (footballer, born 1994) =

Iraqi footballer (1994–2021)

- Saadoon with Al-Naft

Personal information
- Full name: Mustafa Saadoon Hantoosh
- Date of birth: 28 January 1994
- Place of birth: Baghdad, Iraq
- Date of death: 23 April 2021 (aged 27)
- Place of death: Baghdad Medical City, Baghdad, Iraq
- Position: Goalkeeper

Youth career
- Al-Quwa Al-Jawiya
- Al-Shorta

Senior career*
Years	Team	Apps	(Gls)
–2015	Al-Kahrabaa		
2015–2021	Al-Naft		
- * Club domestic league appearances and goals

Mustafa Saadoon Hantoosh (Arabic: مصطفى سعدون حنتوش; 28 January 1994 – 23 April 2021) was an Iraqi professional footballer who played as a goalkeeper.

== Club career ==
Saadoon started playing football from a young age, as a goalkeeper with his friends in the streets of Jisr Diyala, a neighbourhood in Baghdad, Iraq. He played for the youth setups of Al-Quwa Al-Jawiya and Al-Shorta before moving to Al-Kahrabaa, where he played for multiple seasons.

Saadoon joined Al-Naft on 17 July 2015, and played in the 2018–19 Arab Club Champions Cup, Al-Naft's first participation in the competition. He played for Al-Naft in the Iraqi Premier League up to and including the 2020–21 season, until his death in 2021.

== International career ==
Saadoun was called up for the Iraq national under-20 team for the 2011 Arab Cup U-20 and for the Iraq national under-23 team for the 2016 AFC U-23 Championship, but did not play a game in either tournament. His only call-up for the senior team came in 2018, as an unused substitute in a friendly against Palestine.

== Personal life ==
In 2020, Saadoon volunteered for German humanitarian organization "Without Borders", providing assistance for people infected with COVID-19.

== Death ==
On 18 April 2021, Saadoon suffered from a sudden stroke during a training session with Al-Naft, and was transferred to the Baghdad Medical City. He died five days later, on 23 April.
