= Baghdad Tower =

Coordinates: 33°18′12″N 44°21′15″E

Baghdad Tower Al-Ma'mun Tower
- برج المأمون (Arabic), Burj Al-Ma'mūn
- Interactive map of the Baghdad Tower; Al-Ma'mun Tower area
- Former names: International Saddam Tower

General information
- Status: constructed
- Type: Mixed use: telecommunication, restaurant, observation
- Location: Baghdad, Iraq
- Completed: 1994
- Renovated: 2010

Height
- Antenna spire: 204.0 m (669 ft)

Baghdad Tower (Al-Ma'mun) (Arabic: برج بغداد, romanized: Burj Baghdad), previously called International Saddam Tower (برج صدام الدولي), is a 204 m (669 ft) TV tower in Baghdad, Iraq. The tower opened in 1994 and replaced a communications tower destroyed in the Gulf War. A revolving restaurant and observation deck are located on the top floor. After the 2003 invasion of Iraq, the tower was occupied by American soldiers and was renamed as Baghdad Tower.

== History ==
The tower's construction began in 1991 adjoining to the al-Ma'mun Telecom Exchange. It was built with a height of 204 meters with a revolving restaurant on top as well as the words "Allah is the Greatest" on the top of the restaurant. The center of the tower consists of seven floors with a modern architectural style and is located on the land of the old pedal. It also became the main international gateway to receive and send all types of communications in Baghdad. Located in the Yarmouk neighborhood west of Baghdad, it was a major tourist site.

On March 27, 2003, a week into the US-led invasion of the country, 4,700-pound bombs destroyed the al-Ma'mun Telecom Exchange and along with it, caused damages to the tower and was abandoned. In 2007, the tower was to be the centerpiece of a short-lived urban renewal project by the Ministry of Communications which ended three years later. During the project, a U.S. State Department advisor noted that it was the "only discernible sign of major building construction in Baghdad." For a while, the tower was once again abandoned as funds for ministry investments became limited due to the rise of ISIS in Northern Iraq. The tower was refurbished in 2016 and since then, many projects and announcements have came up about the opening of the tower but generally have all been delayed or had their process stopped for no clear reason. Interest in the tower was renewed in 2018 when even former-Iraqi President Barham Salih was brought into the occasion. As of 2020, the tower remained closed despite public outcry.

== Gallery ==
The Baghdad Tower, on the right.

Baghdad Tower, July 2007.

Rebuilding the tower and its surroundings.

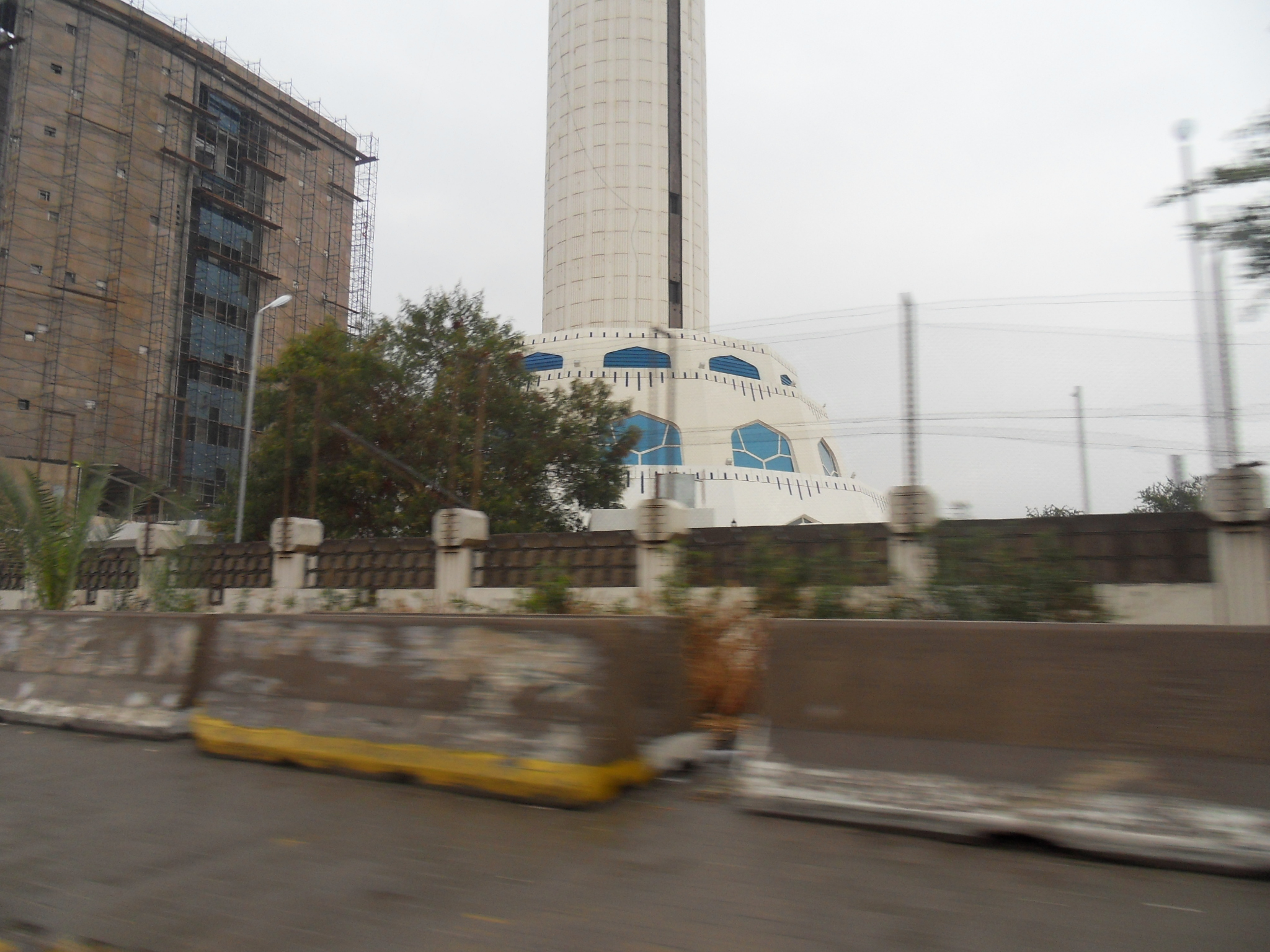
Tower Center, December 2010.

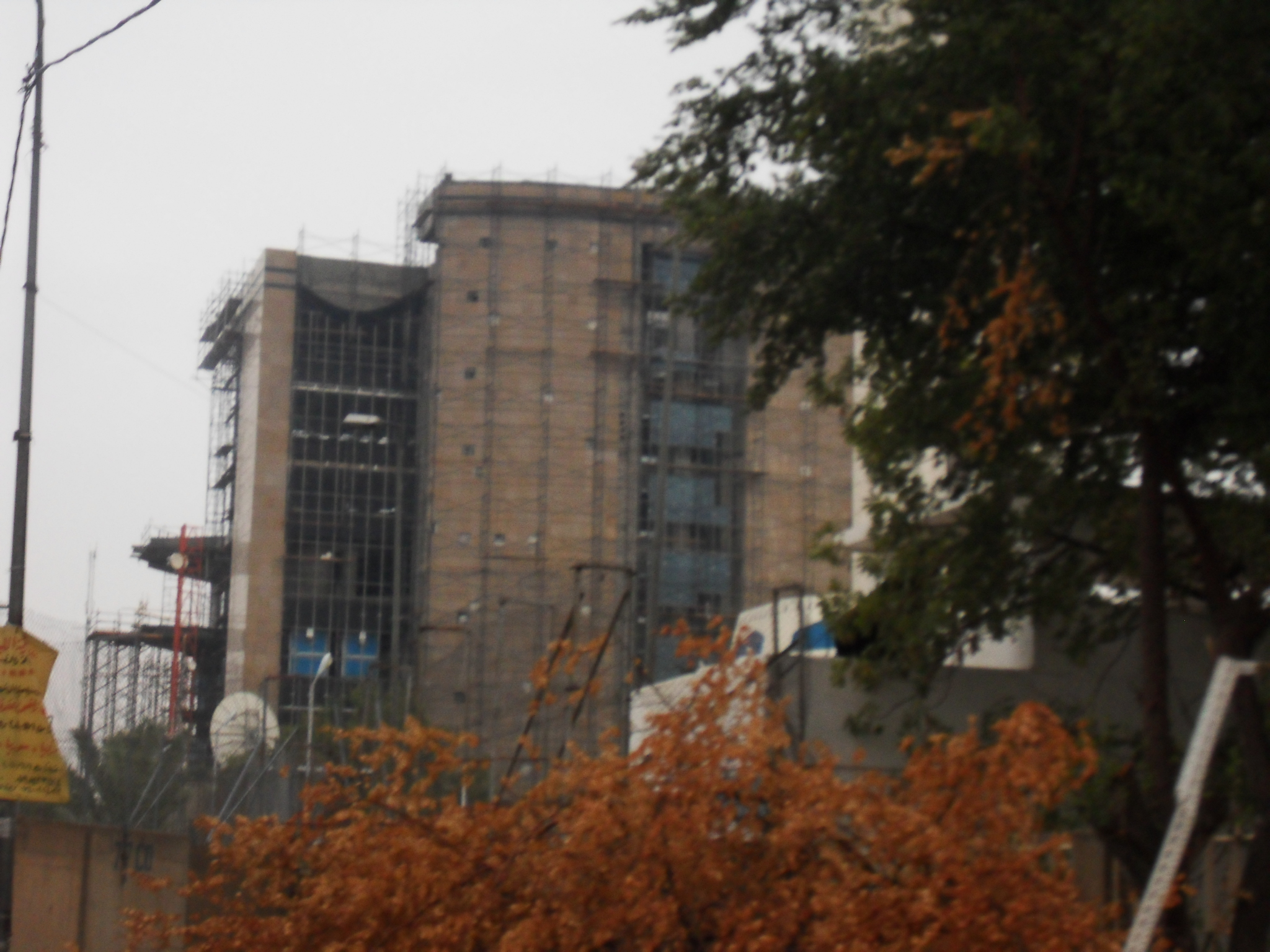
Tower Center (Al Mamoun Communications Center), December 2010.

Al Mamoun Communications Center, Feb 2018.
