= Garden of Ridván, Baghdad =

Garden associated with the Baháʼí Faith

Coordinates: 33°20′42″N 44°22′43″E

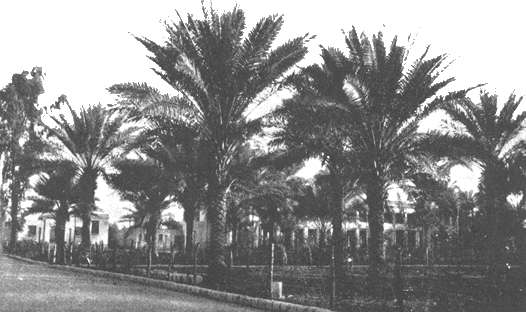
Garden of Ridván, Baghdad

The Garden of Ridván (literally garden of paradise) or Najibiyyih Garden was a wooded garden in what is now Baghdad's Rusafa District, on the banks of the Tigris river. It is notable as the location where Baháʼu'lláh, founder of the Baháʼí Faith, stayed for twelve days from April 21 to May 2, 1863, after the Ottoman Empire exiled him from Baghdad and before commencing his journey to Constantinople. During his stay in this garden, Baháʼu'lláh announced to his followers that he was the messianic figure of He whom God shall make manifest, whose coming had been foretold by the Báb. These events are celebrated annually during the Festival of Ridván.

== Location and appearance ==
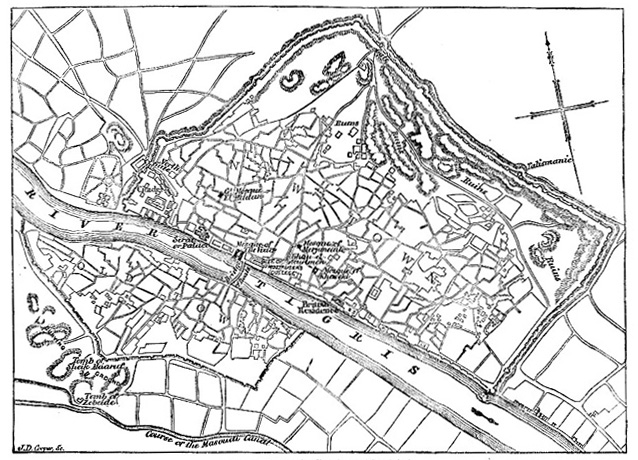
Baghdad in the 1850s. The garden is located at the left of this map, above the Tigris River.

The garden was located in a large agricultural area immediately north of the walls of the city of Baghdad, about 450 metres (1,480 ft) from the city's northern Mu'azzam gate. Located on the eastern bank of the Tigris River in what is now the Bab al-Mu'azzam neighbourhood of Baghdad's Rusafa District, it was directly opposite the district in which Baháʼu'lláh lived during his stay in the city, on the river's western bank.

A ground plan drawn in the 1850s by officers of the Indian Navy (pictured) shows the garden immediately adjacent to the city's citadel, with four avenues meeting at a circular area in the centre. A structure, possibly the garden palace, is located at the edge of the garden near the riverbank. The garden was described as a wooded garden having four "flower-bordered avenues" lined with roses, which were collected by gardeners during Baháʼu'lláh's stay and piled in the center of his tent to be offered to visitors. "So great would be the heap," the chronicler Nabíl-i-Aʻzam relates, "that when His companions gathered to drink their morning tea in His presence, they would be unable to see each other across it." Nightingales were said to sing loudly in the garden, which, together with the fragrance of the roses, "created an atmosphere of beauty and enchantment". (Note: The love of the nightingale for the rose is a common theme in Persian literature, particularly in mystic poetry, where the nightingale's yearning is used as a metaphor for the soul's yearning for God. ("The Rose and nightingale in Persian literature". Archived from the original on 2008-01-22.) One night during his stay in the Garden of Ridván, Baháʼu'lláh is recorded as having spoken the following words: "Consider these nightingales. So great is their love for these roses, that sleepless from dusk till dawn, they warble their melodies and commune with burning passion with the object of their adoration. How then can those who claim to be afire with the rose-like beauty of the Beloved choose to sleep?" (Taherzadeh, Adib (1976). The Revelation of Baháʼu'lláh, Volume 1. Oxford, UK: George Ronald. p. 259. ISBN 0-85398-270-8.)) By the side of the river, upstream from Najib Pasha's palace, was an open space in the garden where one of Baháʼu'lláh's companions raised a tent for him, around which a small village of tents was later raised for the rest of his family.

In travelling to Constantinople, Baháʼu'lláh's caravan would take a road that would bring them by the garden, thus it was a logical choice for them stop there in order to assemble and to receive visitors. Access to the garden from the opposite riverbank was possible by way of a ferry across the Tigris, as in Baháʼu'lláh's case, or by "floating bridge", as in the case of the governor and other friends who followed.

== History ==
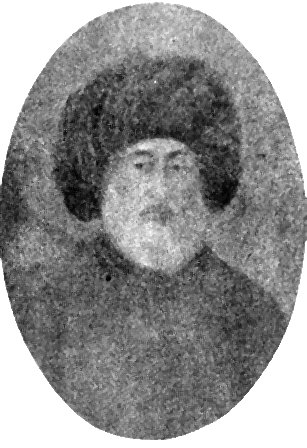
Muhammad Najib Pasha.

The Najibiyyih Garden, as it was first known, was named for Muhammad Najib Pasha, the wāli (governor) of Baghdad from 1842 to 1847, who built the garden and an attached palace in what was originally an agricultural area outside the city. Although Najib Pasha died in May 1851, the garden was presumably in the hands of his heirs when it was used by Baháʼu'lláh, between April through May, 1863.

Despite its importance to the Baháʼí community, the garden was never owned by the Baháʼís. It was purchased by the government in 1870, and was used as a guest house for Nasruddin-Shah—who was responsible for Baháʼu'lláh's imprisonment and exile—when he visited Iraq in 1870. The park was further developed during the governorship of Midhat Pasha (1869–1872), who leveled the road leading to the garden and built another road, approximately 400–500 meters in length. The garden was cleared during the early twentieth century, to make way for the Royal Hospital. (Note: A 1928 map produced by the Public Works Department of the City of Baghdad shows the Royal Hospital on the site where the garden was once located. (National Archives of the United Kingdom)) Baghdad Medical City, a large complex of teaching hospitals, now stands in its place.

=== Ridván ===
Baháʼu'lláh, after being imprisoned in Persia for his involvement with the Bábí community, was exiled to Baghdad by Naser al-Din Shah Qajar, arriving in the spring of 1853. Over the next decade in Baghdad, his influence grew to the point where the Persian government feared he might use it to threaten their sovereignty from abroad. In response, the Persian ambassador in Constantinople demanded Baháʼu'lláh be banished from Baghdad, to which the Ottoman government eventually acceded.

Baháʼu'lláh entered the Najibiyyih Garden on April 22, 1863, in order to receive visitors and allow his family to prepare for his upcoming trip to Constantinople. He crossed the Tigris in a small boat accompanied by his sons ʻAbdu'l-Bahá, Mírzá Mihdí and Mírzá Muhammad ʻAlí, his secretary Mirza Aqa Jan and some others. After their arrival in the garden, Baháʼu'lláh announced his mission and station for the first time to a small group of family and friends. For the next eleven days Baháʼu'lláh received visitors including the governor of Baghdad. Baháʼu'lláh's family was not able to join him until April 30, the ninth day, since the river had risen and made travel to the garden difficult. On the twelfth day of their stay in the garden, Baháʼu'lláh and his family left the garden and started on their travel to Constantinople.

It was Baháʼu'lláh who gave the garden the name of Ridván ("paradise") during his stay, and the name was thereafter applied to the twelve-day Festival of Ridván—known as the "King of Festivals"—celebrated annually by Baháʼís between 21 April and 2 May. Certain days of this festival are tied to major events that took place during the period of Baháʼu'lláh's stay in the garden: the first day celebrates his arrival in the garden; the ninth day, the arrival of his family; and the twelfth day, his caravan's departure towards Constantinople. These three days are major Baháʼí holy days, on which work must be suspended.

== See also ==
- Garden of Ridván, Akka
- Baháʼí gardens

== Notes and references ==
Notes

References

- Smith, P. (1999). A Concise Encyclopedia of the Baháʼí Faith. Oxford, UK: Oneworld Publications. ISBN 1-85168-184-1.
