= Harakat Ahrar al-Iraq =

- قوة أحرار العراق
- Leader: Mahdi al-Sumayda'i
- Dates active: June 2014–present
- Country: Iraq
- Active regions: Iraq; Ba'athist Syria
- Ideology: Sunni Islamism
- Part of: Popular Mobilization Units (since 8 November 2014)
- Wars: the War in Iraq (2013–2017) *American-led intervention in Iraq (2014–2021) *Islamic State insurgency in Iraq (2017–present) *
- Website: Youtube Channel

Harakat Ahrar al-Iraq was formed under the name of Quwat Ahrar al-Iraq (Force of the Free Men of Iraq) on 14 June 2014 according to the fatwa of the Grand Mufti Sheikh Mahdi al-Sumayda'i, the grand mufti of the Republic of Iraq, on the necessity of enlisting and defending Iraq.

Quwat Ahrar al-Iraq was formed in Baghdad and the first battles were in Tikrit and Baiji, and then in Anbar. In addition to these areas, Quwat Ahrar al-Iraq fought in order to liberate Iraq from ISIS in; Anbar: al-Hawz area, al-Mal'ab, Hit, Haditha, al-Baghdadi, Jazirat al-Khalidiya, Jazirat Rawa, Rawa, Anah and Rutba. In Salah al-Din; Tikrit, Baiji, Shirqat. Kirkuk, Mosul, Qayarra and the east of the Tigris River and Rabi'a (Ninawa countryside), as well as Baghdad and al-Mashahadah. According to Anas Mahdi al-Sumayda'i, secretary general of Harakat Ahrar al-Iraq, during these battles Quwat Ahrar al-Iraq had 250 casualties and more than 700 wounded.

Quwat Ahrar al-Iraq was registered in the Popular Mobilization Forces on 8 November 2014 under the 86th Brigade.

According to Anas Mahdi, in 2018 Iraqi parliamentary elections, one of the candidates affiliated with the Quwat Ahrar al-Iraq obtained more than 13,000 votes in Ninawa province "but the votes were taken after modification and the great conspiracy in the elections".

Harakat Ahrar al-Iraq, on 26 June 2022 committed rocket attacks against Turkish Zlikan base, Iraq. Four rockets were used in the attacks. No casualties were recorded.

On 21 July 2022, Harakat Ahrar al-Iraq responded to Zakho resort attack where nine civilians, including two children were murdered by the Turkish military by stating; "Our response will not be ink on paper, but with rockets, marches, missiles. We are among the vengeful criminals."
