= Yarmouk, Baghdad =

Yarmouk اليرموك
- Neighborhood
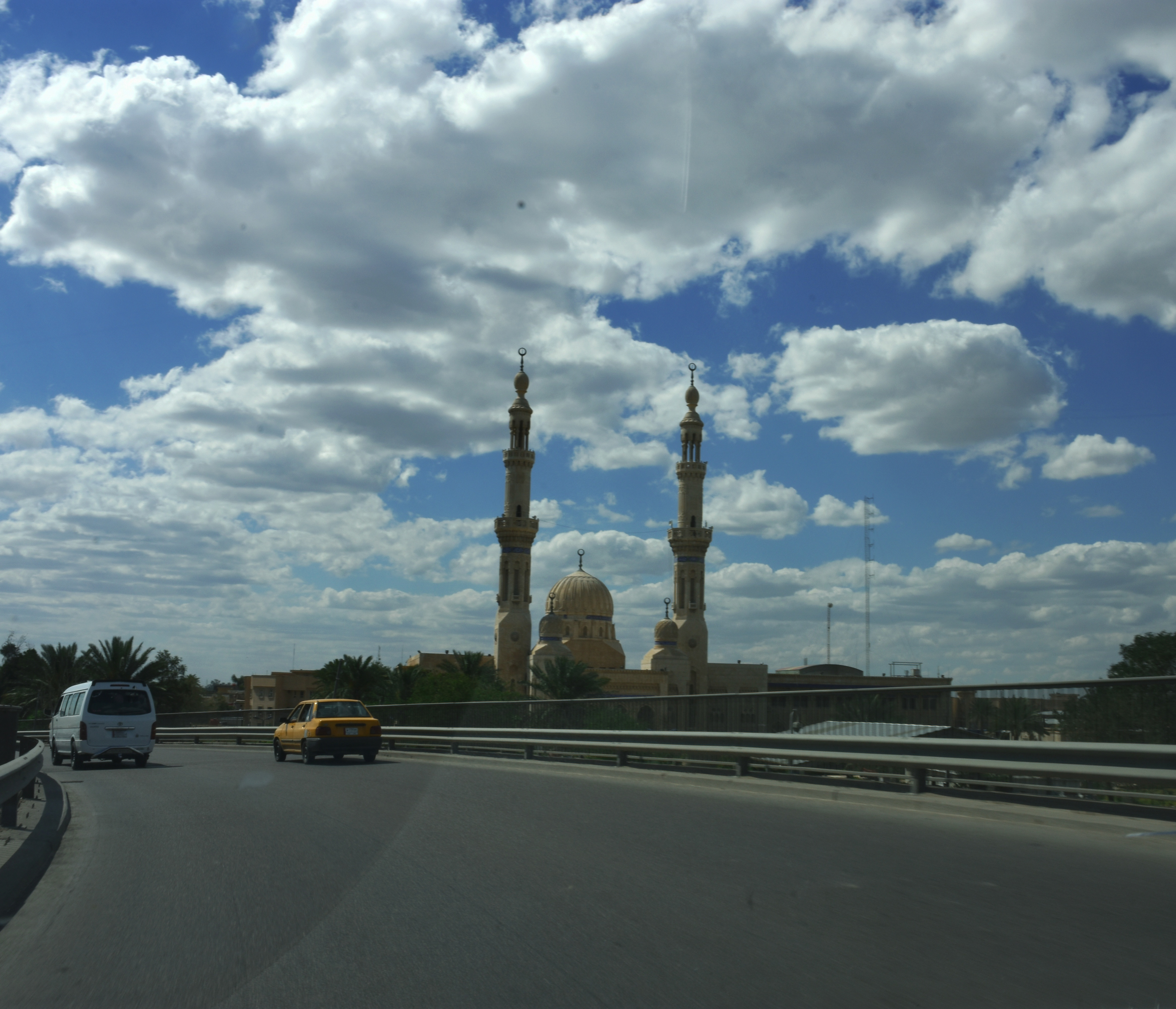
- Umm al-Tabul Mosque, Yarmouk neighborhood, Baghdad
- Interactive map of Yarmouk
- Coordinates: 33.2813°N 44.3457°E
- Country: Iraq
- Governorate: Baghdad Governorate
- District: Mansour district
- ZIP: 10015

Yarmouk (Arabic, اليرموك) is an upmarket neighborhood (67th) located within Mansour district in Baghdad, Iraq. It is adjacent to Baghdad Airport Road. Built in the 1950s, it was once home to numbers of high-ranking officials from Abdul-Karim Qasim's government. Yarmouk is now inhabited by people from both the Shia and Sunni sects, while it used to be the home of many Sunni officials during Saddam Hussein's rule. Al-Yarmouk Teaching Hospital is located in Yarmouk, along with Al Yarmouk University College. The Zip code is 10015.

Yarmouk is bordered by three important urban square—Jordan Intersection, Yarmouk Square and Qahtan Square. The Yarmouk Square is home to a statue of the former president of Iraq Ahmed Hassan al-Bakr.

== History ==
Yarmouk is one of the prominent districts of Baghdad, established during the reign of former Iraqi President Abdul Karim Qasim. The district was developed by the Officers Housing Construction Association, a private organization that catered to Iraqi army officers. The association constructed homes for these officers, allowing them to pay for the houses in installments over a 25-year period. The first housing units were completed and delivered to officers in the early 1960s. Yarmouk is located on the Karkh side of Baghdad, with another district named Officers City situated on the Rusafa side, also developed by the same association.

Initially, the district was called Officers' City, with a major street known as Four Streets Street running through it. Over time, the district's name changed to Al-Yarmouk, and the main street was renamed Adnan Khair Allah Talfah Street. The area became known for housing former officers of the Iraqi army. Yarmouk is administratively affiliated with the Al-Mansour district, which is part of the Al-Karkh region in Baghdad. The district is divided into five areas based on the housing batches delivered to officers, which are referred to as the first, second, third, fourth, and fifth batches.

=== Post-2003 invasion ===
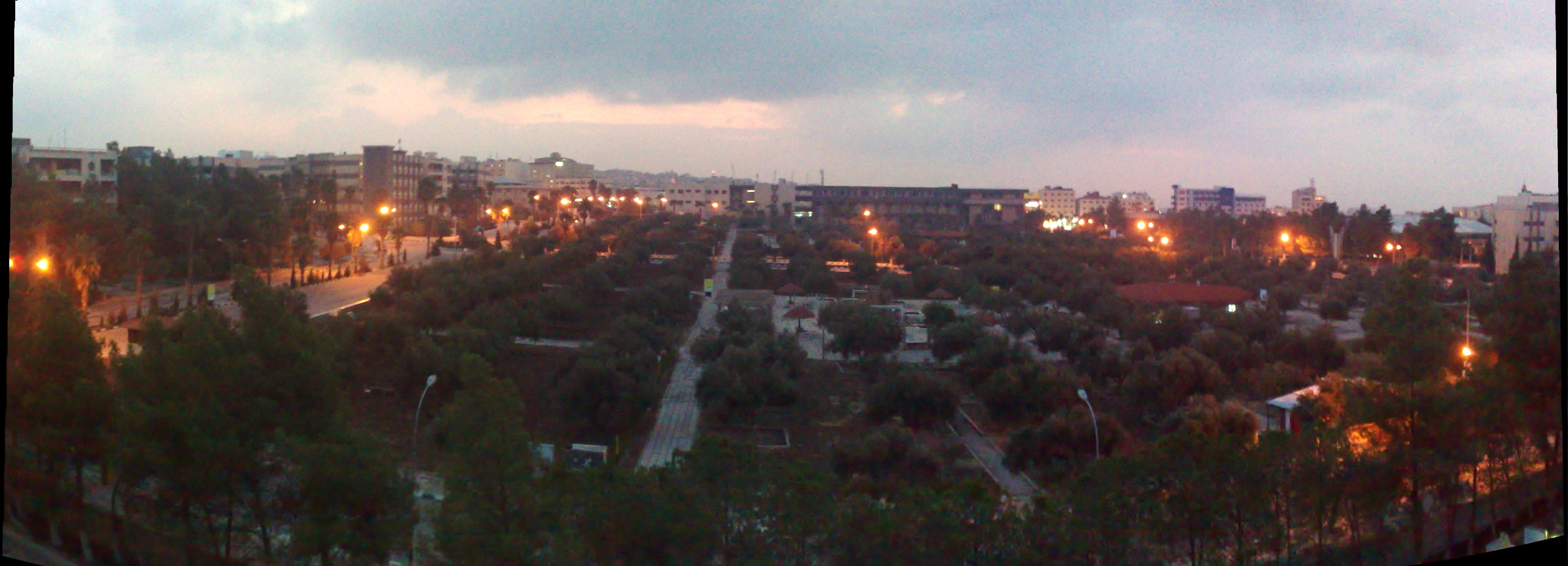
Al-Yarmouk Institute

Following the U.S. invasion of Iraq in 2003, Yarmouk faced severe security challenges. Like many other areas of Baghdad, it suffered from attacks by government militias, often with the support of the occupying U.S. forces. In 2006, the district witnessed violence, including the infamous Nisour Square killings, where Blackwater militia forces were responsible for the deaths of numerous civilians.

== Notable Institutions ==
- Al-Yarmouk Teaching Hospital: A major healthcare facility in the district.
- College of Medicine at Al-Mustansiriya University: A significant medical school in the area.
- Baghdad Tower: is located in Al-Yarmouk

Some of the key mosques in Yarmouk include:

- Al-Mamun Mosque: One of Baghdad’s older mosques.
- Umm Al-Tabool Mosque: A large mosque in the area.
- Bilal Mosque: Located in Qahtan Square.
- Al-Shawwaf Mosque: In the fourth Al-Wajbah area.
- Omar Al-Mukhtar Mosque: A recently built mosque in the first Al-Wajbah area.

=== Educational and Commercial Institutions ===
Yarmouk is home to several schools and markets:

- Schools:
  - Rawdat Al-Naseem
  - 14 Ramadan Mixed Elementary School
  - Al-Yarmouk Girls' High School
  - Al-Kindi Preparatory School
- Markets:
  - Rajab Market
  - Al-Ghazi Market (now known as Sayed Al-Haleeb and Siham Al-Ubaidi).

=== Cultural and Recreational Facilities ===
In the center of Yarmouk is the Cultural and Recreational Center for Officers (also known as the Officers' Club), which houses Al-Ma'mun Library. The area also has sports facilities, including Al-Zuhawi Square and Daham Football Field, which were later used for the establishment of the Yarmouk Youth Center.

== Famous Figures ==
The area was home to many high-ranking officials, including:

- Former President Abdul Rahman Arif
- Major General Abdul Wahhab Sheikh Ali, a leader of the 1941 May Revolution
- Hammad Shihab, Minister of Defense
- Professor Subhi Abdul Hamid, former Minister of Foreign Affairs
- Several notable officials during Saddam Hussein’s era, including Nizar Hamdoun (Iraq’s UN representative) and Adnan Khairallah, the former Minister of Defense.

=== Ministers' Complex ===
Yarmouk also contains the Ministers' Complex, a residential area built for government ministers during Saddam Hussein’s regime.
