= Mahdi al-Sumayda'i =

Iraqi Islamic scholar and politician (born 1955)

Grand Mufti Mahdi al-Sumayda'i
- مهدي الصميدعي
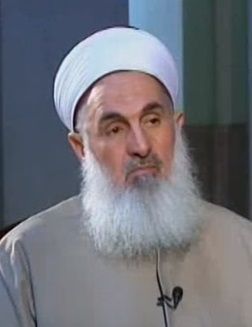
- Al-Sumayda'i on Iraqi television
- Incumbent
- Assumed office February 2014

Religious life
- Religion: Islam
- Denomination: Sunni
- Institute: Mustansiriya University
- Jurisprudence: Shafi'i or Hanbali

Muslim leader
- Post: Grand Mufti of Iraq

Mahdi ibn Ahmad al-Sumayda'i (Arabic: مهدي بن أحمد الصميدعي, romanized: Mahdī ibn ʾAḥmad al-Ṣumaydaʿī; born 1 July 1955) is an Iraqi Islamic scholar and politician who is currently serving as the grand mufti of Sunnis in Iraq since 2014.

Al-Sumayda'i runs the Sunni Fatwa Council in Baghdad, at the Umm-al-Tubul mosque. Since 2014 he has been recognized by the government of Nuri al-Maliki as Grand Mufti of the Sunnis of Iraq, the highest Iraqi Sunni religious authority.

He played an important political role in the events of Iraq, in an attempt to involve part of Salafi Islam in the fight against the Islamic State, alongside the Shia forces. Despite this, he has close ties with the Islamic Republic of Iran.

== Career ==
=== Religious activities ===
During the American occupation of Iraq, Sumayda'i led Harakat Ahrar al-Iraq (The free men of Iraq) , supporting the jihad against the occupation forces. In January 2004, he was arrested by American troops as he exited the mosque in Baghdad after a prayer. Later released, he played a mediating role between the government and Salafist resistance. Following the withdrawal of American troops in December 2011, Sumayda'i was co-opted by the government of Nuri al-Maliki to persuade Salafist Sunni preachers to participate in a unified legal council with the Shias. The attempt, during a conference on the Iraqi resistance in February 2012, was not successful, moreover, due to his support for the Shia government Sumayda'i suffered an attempted attack in August 2012.

=== Grand mufti ===
In February 2014 Sumayda'i is recognized by the government of Nuri al-Maliki as a stranger to the Sunni uprising; the Iraqi government recognized him as the leader of a Sunni Fatwa Council (Dar al-Iftaa Ahl al-Sunna wa Jamaah) in the place of Grand Mufti of the Sunnis, with the aim of involving Sunni citizens in the fight against ISIS alongside the Iraqi army and Popular Mobilization Forces.

=== Declarations and fatwaas ===
- in June 2014 the Grand Mufti condemned the Islamic State, calling it a foreign project and inviting Iraqis to unite to fight it, joining the appeal of Shia Ayatollah Ali al-Sistani.
- in January 2016 he attended the ceremony to promote 500 Sunni recruits of the Popular Mobilization Forces engaged in the war on ISIS.
- in June 2016, in the aftermath of the liberation of Fallujah from ISIS, the spokesman of the Grand Mufti, Sheikh Amer al-Bayati, declared that the liberation of the city by Iraqis of every ethnicity and religion belied the propaganda of ISIS, according to which the civil war is that of "one religious component against the other", joining the statements of the spokesman of the Shiite Ayatollah of Najaf Ali al-Sistani, Sheikh Abdul Mahdi al-Karbalai, and of the president of the Shia Waqf Office, sheikh Sami al-Masudi.
- in December 2016 following a fatwā, the Grand Mufti invited preachers and political leaders who had supported the Anbar Uprising and the Islamic State to leave Iraq, their attempt to obstruct the political process having failed.
- Following the assassination attempt targeted at al-Sumayda'i with a car bomb at the headquarters of the Sunni Dar al-Ifta on January 2, 2017, claimed by Daesh, the Grand Mufti accused Iraqi politicians in collusion with Western countries of being the cause of the continuous attacks in Iraq.
- In March 2017 spokesman al-Bayati declared that Iraqis, after defeating Israelis and Americans in Iraq (as occult supporters of ISIS), will have to go directly against Israel to clean Palestine from the occupiers.
- on March 28, 2017, at the end of an international interreligious conference, the Grand Mufti visited the shrine of Imam Husayn in Kerbela, inviting them to refuse the speeches of preachers and politicians trying to divide the Iraqi nation, while a delegation of Dar al-Ifta, led by Shaykh al-Bayati, visited Mustansiriyya University in Baghdad.
- in February 2018, Grand Mufti Sumayda'i praised the role of Iranian militias in the fight against ISIS, supporting the role of the Islamic Republic in Iraq.
- in August 2018 spokesman al-Bayati denounced the cooperation of some Islamic Gulf Countries such as Saudi Arabia in enforcing US sanctions against Iran and Turkey, declaring that for their collaboration these countries are placing themselves "outside Islam".
- in December 2018 the Grand Mufti obtained from the commander of the Iranian Armed Forces Qasem Soleimani, in the presence of the Deputy Commander of the Popular Mobilization Forces Abu Mahdi al-Muhandis, an important honor for the "firm position in defense of Islam" and the "sincerity of sentiments and the drive towards the liberation of Palestine". According to Israeli sources, the formation of the new government was discussed in the meeting, which took place the day after the elections.
- In December 2018 following the Iraqi government's decision to include Christmas as a national holiday, the Grand Mufti issued a fatwā urging Sunni Muslims not to take part in the celebrations, as this would be tantamount to endorsing Christian belief. The fatwa sparked the protest of the Chaldean patriarch Louis Sako, who urged "peaceful coexistence" and "mutual respect" between religions, and called on the Iraqi government to oppose those who spread divisive ideas, "especially from an official platform". Many Muslims also distanced themselves from the fatwā, including the president of the Sunni Waqf Office al-Heymem, who highlighted that Christians are an "essential component" of the Iraqi nation with "deep roots" in the country's history. The president of the Ministry of Religious Affairs of the autonomous region of Kurdistan, asked for legal action to be taken against the Grand Mufti.
- in June 2019 al-Sumayda'i asked for a ban on the sale of alcohol in Iraq, specifically bringing back a three-year bill that was no longer in the Iraqi law.
- In January 2020 following the American attack on the head of the Quds Forces in Iraq, General Qassem Suleimani, al-Sumayda'i spoke in one with the Iraqi authorities claiming Iraqi national sovereignty and joining the call for the withdrawal of foreign troops from Iraq.
