= Khalidiya Island =

River peninsula in Al-Anbar Province, Iraq

Khalidiya Island (Arabic: جزيرة الخالدية Jazīrat al-Khāldiyat, Jazirah al-Khaldiyah, Jazeera Khaldiya, Jazirah al-Khalidiyah, Khalediya Island) is a river peninsula and populated area in Al-Anbar Province, in central Iraq.

== Geography ==
Khalidiya Island is located in a loop and on the northern banks of river Euphrates. It is situated north west of Habbaniyah, west of the villages of Malahameh and Malahma, east of Albu Bali and to the north east of the town of Khalidiya, after which it is named. In the north west the village of Baarayn is located. There are further villages within the Khalidiya Island area.

== History ==
During Anbar offensive, the Iraqi army and its allies started to liberate the area from ISIL in March 2016, after there had been fighting in the area before in January and February. Because there was still resistance in the area, the army started a new offensive on 25 May 2016. On 2 June, an Iraqi official reported the killing of "tens" of ISIL militants in the course of international coalition air raids on Khalidiya Island. On 31 July, Anbar Provincial Council said that the island had been fully liberated from ISIL control. The Ministry of Interior in early August announced that Iraqi forces had captured more than 150 km^{2} of the Khalidiya Island from ISIL and killed more than 180 of their members. After the capture of Khalidiya Island, Iraqi forces, carried out search operations and more than 700 ISIL members were announced to have been killed by the middle of August. By August 20, Commander of Anbar Operations Ismail Mahlawi also announced that the area had fully liberated after Iraqi forces regained control of Albu Canaan, the last ISIL stronghold in the area. On 27 August, Iraqi Prime Minister Haider al-Abadi that Khalidiya island had been completely liberated and the military operations in the area had come to an end. According to Secretary General of Badr Organization, Hadi al-Ameri, over 1,200 ISIL militants were killed in the operation.
