= Bab al-Mu'adham =

Neighborhood in Central Baghdad, Iraq

Bab al-Mu'adham باب المعظم
- Neighborhood
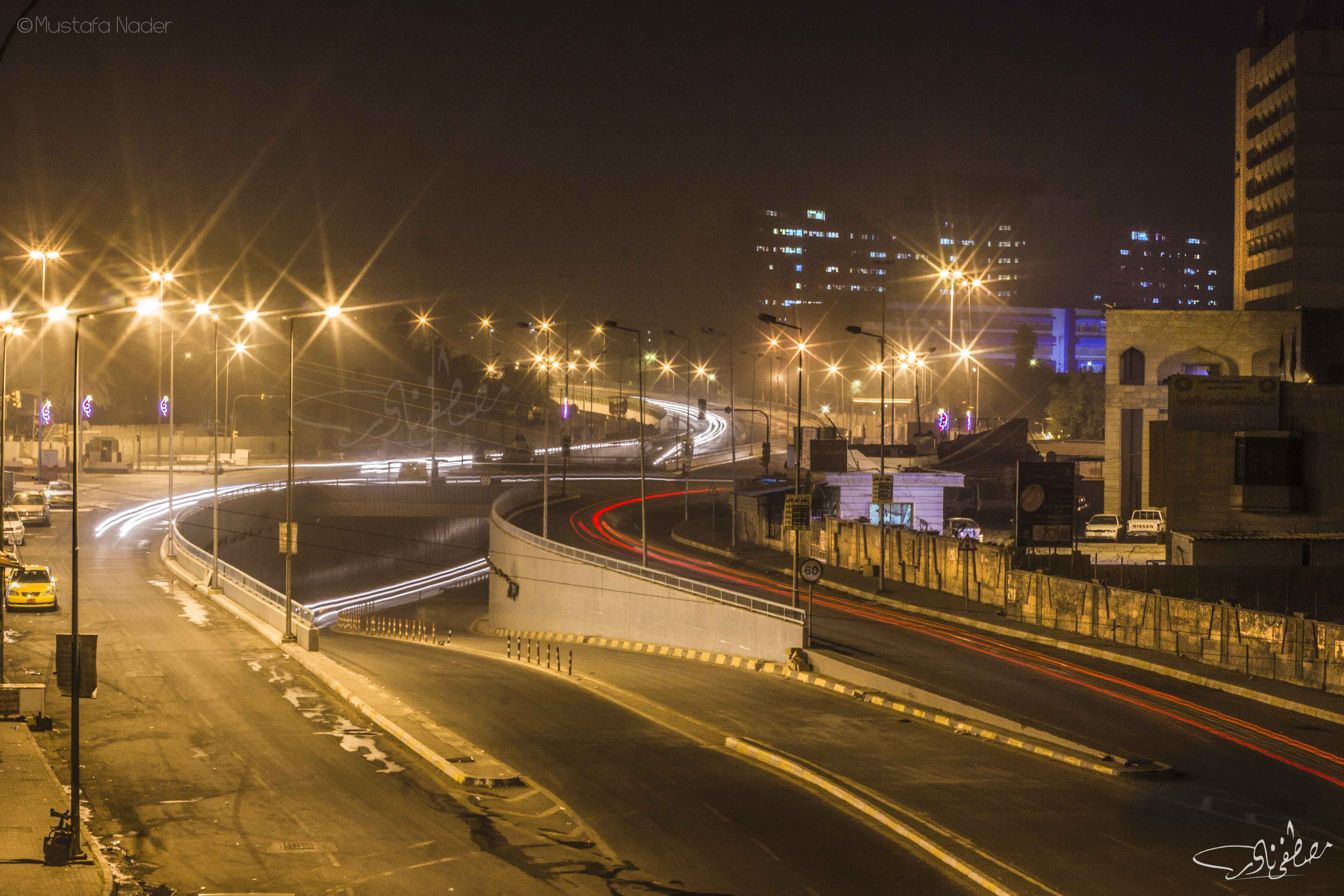
- A picture of the Bab al-Mu'adham intersection and tunnel in 2015
- Interactive map of Bab al-Mu'adham
- Location within Iraq
- Coordinates: 33°21′15″N 44°23′27″E
- Country: Iraq
- Governorate: Baghdad
- District: Rusafa
- Time zone: UTC+3 (AST)

Bab al-Mu'adham (Arabic: باب المعظم; also written as Bab al-Moatham or Bab al-Mu'azzam) is a prominent landmark in Baghdad, Iraq. Bab al-Mu'adham was previously and historically one of the gates of Baghdad during the Ottoman Empire, leading to the mosque of Abu Hanifa, a renowned Islamic scholar. The neighborhood lies to the north of central Baghdad, between the Sarafiya Bridge and al-Sinak Bridge, not far from the Tigris River.

== Name ==
The name "Bab al-Mu'adham" is said to originate from the Imam al-A'dham Mosque (also known as the Abu Hanifa Mosque), which is located near the area.

== Historical background ==
The area of Bab al-Mu'adham is rich in historical significance, with buildings dating back to the late Abbasid era, and it continued to be a vital area during the Ilkhanate, Jalayirid, Ottoman, and later Kingdom of Iraq periods, all the way up to the Republic of Iraq. In the past, it was sometimes referred to as Bab al-Sultan (Gate of the Sultan), a name linked to the Turkish Sultan Toghrul Beg. The gate was demolished in either 1923 or 1932, and its location is now near the old Ministry of Defense, between the Sha'ab Hall and the Uzbek Mosque.

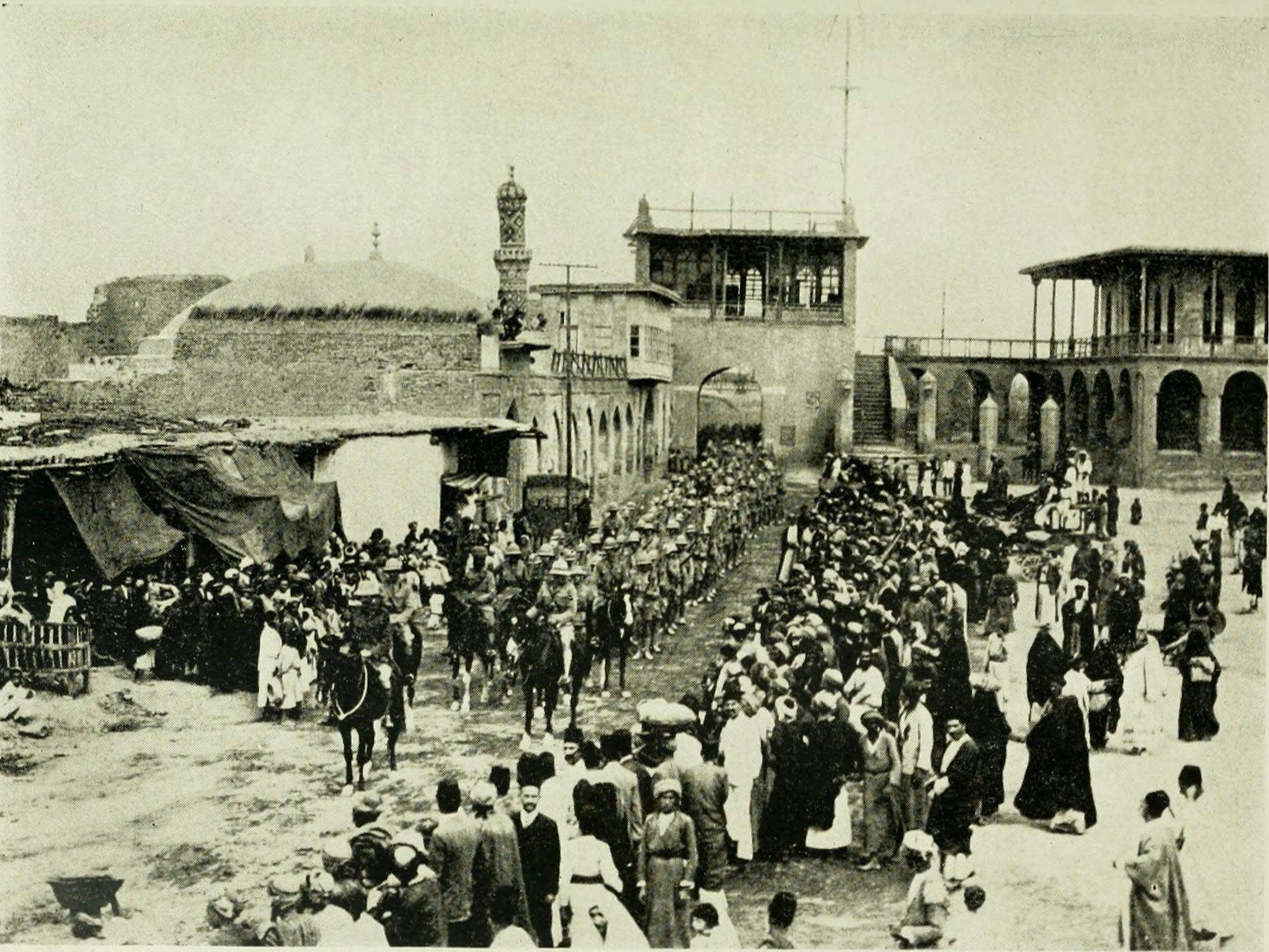
Bab al-Mu'adham in March 1917, when Stanley Maude entered Baghdad

During the British occupation of Iraq, there was an attempt to rename Bab al-Mu'adham as the "North Gate" and Bab al-Sharji as the "South Gate." However, the original Arabic names persisted, and these names were recorded in English as "north gate" and "south gate".

The neighborhood is also home to several significant institutions, including the Iraq National Library and Archive, a campus of the University of Baghdad, and Baghdad Medical City, which are landmarks of modern Baghdad. Additionally, it once contained the famous Garden of Ridván, which was a popular site in the city before its transformation over time.

== Religious significance ==
=== In the Baháʼí Faith ===
The area was home to the wooded garden of the original Garden of Ridván, also known as the . It is notable as the location where Baháʼu'lláh, founder of the Baháʼí Faith, stayed for twelve days from 21 April to 2 May 1863, after the Ottoman Empire had wanted to exile him from Baghdad and before commencing his journey to Constantinople. The garden was located on the banks of the Tigris river. Also by the side of the river, upstream from Najib Pasha's former palace, was an open space in the garden where one of Baháʼu'lláh's companions raised a tent for him. During his stay, Baháʼu'lláh announced to his followers that he was the messianic figure of He whom God shall make manifest, whose coming had been foretold by the Báb. Although the garden no longer exists, the events are celebrated by Baháʼis as the twelve-day festival of Ridván.

=== Al-Muradiyya Mosque ===
An old mosque in the area, located near the Iraq National Library and Archive. It was built during the rule of Governor Murad Pasha.

=== The Uzbek Mosque ===
A historic mosque near the Ministry of Defense, originally built in 1296 AH (1879 AD).

== Important Landmarks of Bab Al-Moatham ==
- Al-Maidan: The remains of a horse racing field, originally established by Caliph Abu Ja'far al-Mansur when Baghdad was founded as the City of Peace.
- Medical City: The largest hospital complex in Iraq, originally named Saddam Medical City during the era of president Saddam Hussein.
- Sha'ab Hall Previously known as King Faisal II Hall.
- Iraq National Library and Archive A major cultural institution preserving Iraq’s historical records.
- Natural History Museum A museum affiliated with the University of Baghdad.
- Ministry of Defense The old ministry headquarters, in use from 1932 to 2003.
- Ministry of Health The headquarters of the Iraqi Ministry of Health.
- Ministry of Religious Endowments Functioned as the ministry's headquarters before 2003.
- Bab Al-Mu'adham Garage A major transportation hub in Baghdad, located between the Bab Al-Moatham complex and the College of Engineering.

=== Educational Institutions ===
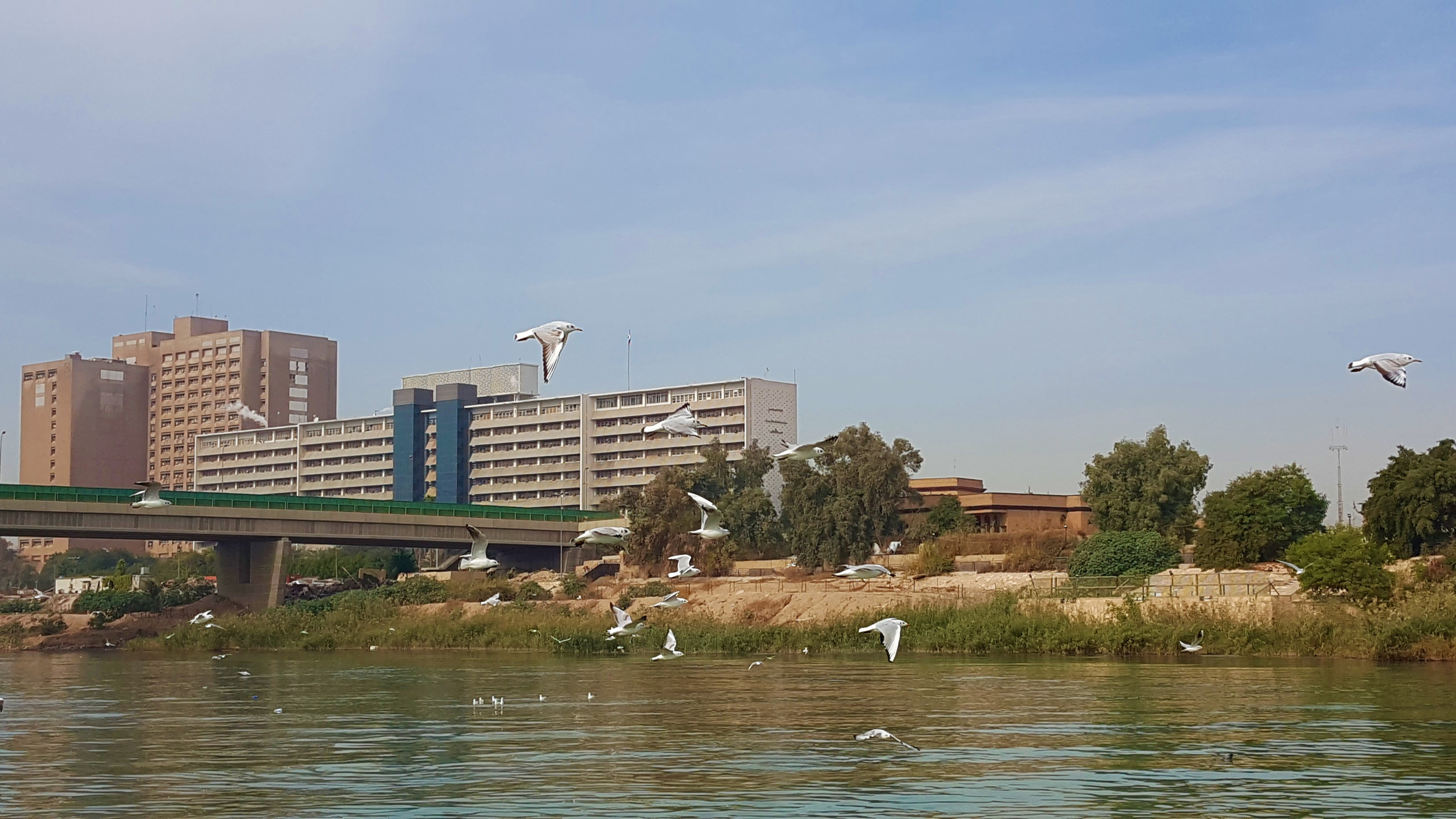
Baghdad Medical City, a major hospital complex in Bab al-Mu'adham, Baghdad.

- University of Baghdad Colleges Complex:
- College of Medicine, University of Baghdad
- College of Dentistry, University of Baghdad
- College of Education, University of Baghdad
- College of Sharia, University of Baghdad
- College of Arts, University of Baghdad
- College of Languages, University of Baghdad
- College of Media, University of Baghdad
- College of Pharmacy, University of Baghdad
- College of Fine Arts, University of Baghdad
- Institute of Administration
- University of Baghdad College of Dentistry
- Mustansiriyah University College of Engineering
- Arab Academics University
