= Baghdad Medical City =

Hospital in Iraq

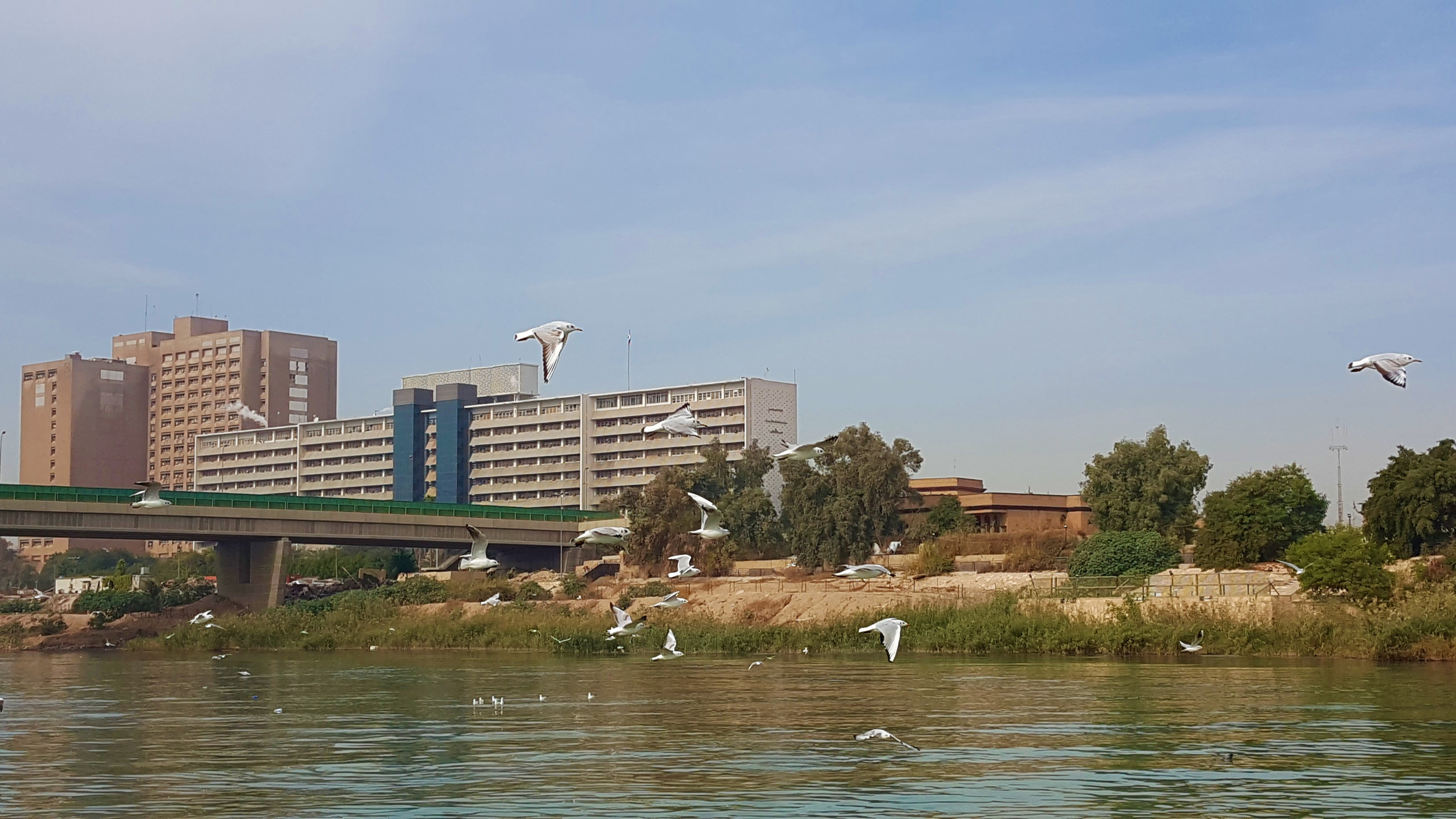
- Baghdad Medical City in 2017

Geography
- Location: Bab Al-Moatham, Baghdad, Baghdad Governorate, Iraq
- Coordinates: 33.347°N 44.379°E

Organisation
- Care system: Public
- Type: Teaching, Specialized
- Affiliated university: University of Baghdad College of Medicine

Services
- Emergency department: Yes
- Beds: 1000+

Helipads
- Helipad: No

History
- Former names: Saddam Medical City (1983–2003); Medical City Teaching Hospital (1973–1983)
- Opened: 1973

Baghdad Medical City (مدينة الطب) formerly known as Saddam Medical City from 1983–2003 and before that known as Medical City Teaching Hospital from 1973–1983 is a complex of several teaching hospitals in Bab Al-Moatham, Baghdad, Iraq. The complex stands where the former Garden of Ridván of Baghdad was.

The Medical City includes the Baghdad University College of Medicine. The largest hospital in the complex is the Surgical Specialties Hospital built in 1980. The second largest is the Baghdad Teaching Hospital, opened in 1970, which contains the out patient clinics and the emergency department. The complex has over a thousand beds for patients.

== Facilities and Buildings ==
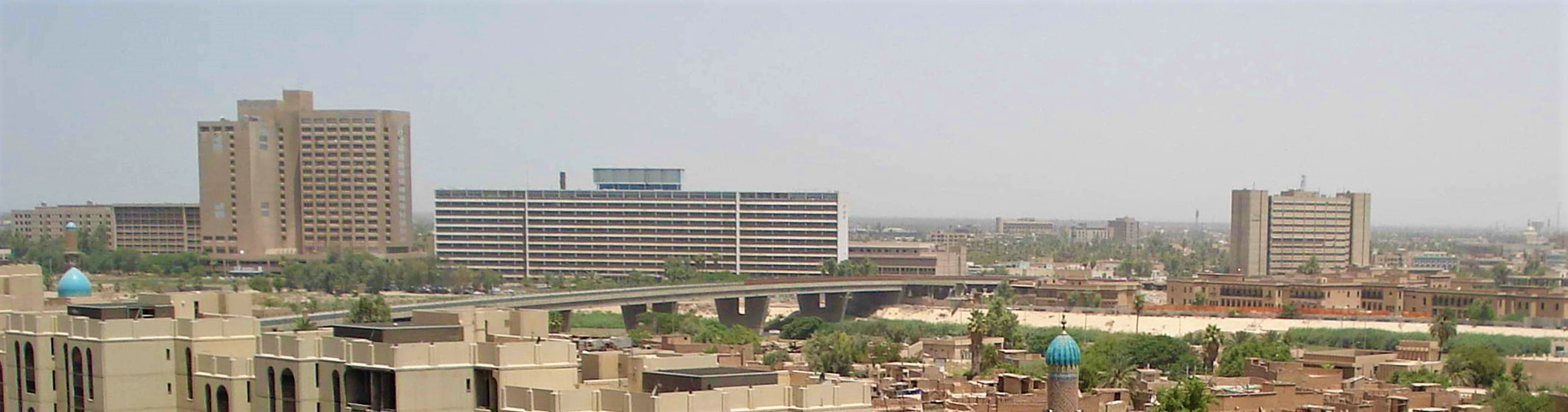
Baghdad Medical City in 2007

=== Hospitals ===
- Baghdad Teaching Hospital
- Surgical Specialties Hospital (includes the Iraqi Center for Cardiac Diseases, Toxicology Center, and Kidney Transplant Center)
- Private Nursing Home Hospital
- Child Protection Teaching Hospital (includes the Bone Marrow Transplant Center)
- Specialized Burn Hospital
- Oncology Teaching Hospital

=== Medical Departments and Centers ===
- Medical City Department (General Management Department)
- Central Laboratories
- Institute of Radiology
- Pasteur Institute
- Tuberculosis Health Center (TB and Chest Institute)
- National Center for Blood Transfusion
- Gastroenterology and Hepatology Center
- Medicolegal Center (Forensic Pathology Department)

=== Educational and Support Facilities ===
- Medical and healthcare schools
- Medical and health libraries with internet centers
- Residency housing for doctors and medical specialists
- Physiotherapy departments (linked to the rehabilitation department in the Ministry of Health)

=== Other Facilities ===
- Police Department

== Financial crisis ==
In 2008 there was only one working elevator, out of ten, in the 18 storey building and no air-conditioning.

In February 2016, the hospital, like all public hospitals in Iraq, began to charge patients for individual services. It was expected that supplies of advanced medical equipment like pacemakers and stents will run out during 2016.

== See also ==
- List of hospitals in Iraq
- Ministry of Health (Iraq)
