= List of hospitals in Iraq =

This is a list of hospitals in Iraq derived from World Health Organization and other records.

== Baghdad (The Capital) ==
Baghdad Governorate
Name	Subdistrict	Directorate of Health	Governorate	No. of Beds
Shahid Ghazi al Harery Surgical		Baghdad Medical City	Baghdad	672
Baghdad teaching hospital	Bab Al-Moatham	Baghdad Medical City	Baghdad	998
Private Nursing Home Hospital	Bab Al-Moatham	Baghdad Medical City	Baghdad	289
Al Kindi General Teaching Hospital	Rusafa	Yarmouk	Baghdad	333
Al Yarmuk General Teaching	Yarmouk	Yarmouk	Baghdad	770
Ibn Rushd Psychiatry & Addiction Hospital	Al Andulus	Rusafa	Baghdad	74
Al-Rashad Psychiatric Hospital		Rusafa	Baghdad	1335
Ibn Al Haitham Teaching Eye Hospital	Karrada, Andulus Square	Rusafa	Baghdad	400
Al Nuaman General Hospital	Adhamiyah	Rusafa	Baghdad	220
Al Qadisiya General Hospital	Sadr City	Rusafa	Baghdad	490
Martyr Sadr Hospital	Sadr City	Rusafa	Baghdad	256
Saddam Maternity Hospital	Sadr City	Rusafa	Baghdad	288
Ibn Al balady Maternity & Children's Hospital	Sadr City	Rusafa	Baghdad	284
fatmih alzahraa Maternity Hospital	Sadr City, Habibiya	Rusafa	Baghdad	
Dar alshifa hospital	Alwaziriya	Rusafa	Baghdad	200
Al Alwaiya Maternity Teaching	Alwaiya, Karadah	Rusafa	Baghdad	332
Al Alwaiya Children Teaching Hospital	Alwaiya, Karadah	Rusafa	Baghdad	125
Al-Imamian Al-Kadhimiyain Medical City	Kadhimiya		Baghdad	630
Al Kadhmiya Hospital for Children	Kadhimiya	Karkh	Baghdad	135
Al Karkh General Hospital	Karkh	Karkh	Baghdad	198
Ibn Al Nafis Vascular and Cardiac Hospital	Rusafa	Yermouk	Baghdad	170
Saddam Center for Cardiology	Karkh		Baghdad	166
Saddam Center for Reconstructive & Plastic Surgery (Al Wasiti)	Andalus		Baghdad	126
Al Noor General Hospital	Kadhimiya	Karkh	Baghdad	211
Al Karama Teaching Hospital	Sheik Maaruf	Karkh	Baghdad	445
Ibn Sina Hospital	Green Zone		Baghdad	
Al-Liquia Maternity Hospital	Karkh		Baghdad	128
Saddam Maternity Hospital	Sadr City	Rusafa	Baghdad	288
Central Pediatric Teaching Hospital	Al-Iskan	Karkh	Baghdad	333
Radiology and Nuclear Medicine Institute		Yarmouk	Baghdad	73
Neurosurgery Teaching Hospital		Baghdad/ AlRissafa	Baghdad	101
Ibn Al Khatib Infectious Diseases Hospital	East Karradah (Al-Jiser)	Rusafa	Baghdad	208
Ibn Zuhr for Chest Disease Hospital (for Infectious Diseases)	East Karradah	Rusafa	Baghdad	292
Al-Za'franiya General Hospital	Al-Za'franiya	Rusafa	Baghdad	
Al Mada'in	Al-Mada'in	Rusafa	Baghdad	56
Al Mahmodia General Hospital	Mahmudiya	Karkh	Baghdad	59
Abu Ghraib General Hospital	Abu Ghraib	Karkh	Baghdad	45
al Furat General Hospital	Abbas Ibn Firnas Square (near)	Karkh	Baghdad	96
Welfare Children's Hospital	Bab Al-Moatham	Baghdad Medical City	Baghdad	

=== Military Hospital ===
- Hammad Shahab Hospital
- Al-Rasheed Military Hospital
- Air Force Military Hospital
- Ibn Al-Kuff Military Hospital for Spinal Cord Injuries with Prosthetic Center/Factory

=== Private Hospitals ===
- Al Rahibat
- Al Rafidain
- Dar Al Najat
- Dar alshifa
- Baghdad
- Al Jarah
- Babel
- Qaisa
- Al Khaial
- Al Alusi
- Abdul Majeed
- Al Emam
- Dejla
- Al Razi
- Al Dhergham
- Al Jaibaji
- Al Zahraa
- Al Arabi
- Al Jami'a
- Dar Al Salam
- Al Rhma Hospital
- Al Mustansriya
- Al Amal
- Al Muaiyad
- Al Bisharah
- Al Furat
- Al Haidary Maternity
- Red Crescent
- Al Hayat Maternity
- Al Huda
- Al Harthiya
- Al Jadriya
- Surgery Red Crescent
- Al Wazirya
- Al Karada
- Al Sa'doon
- Al Salama Private
- Al Ferdaws
- Kamal Al Samerra'y
- Janin Private
- Risafa h
- Al Karch Hospital Group
- Z. Al Badri Dermatology and Cosmetics Clinic
- Al Shefaa Private
- Al Rawi
- Al Dahwi
- Al Mukhutar private hospital
- Al Khadria private hospital
- alzayton private hospital

== Basra ==
=== Public Hospitals ===
- Teaching Hospitals
  - Al Basrah General Teaching Hospital (Formerly, Al Jomhouri Hospital)
  - Al Sadir Teaching Hospital (Formerly, Sadaam Hospital)
  - Al Mawani General Teaching Hospital
  - Al Basrah Maternity & Children's Teaching Hospital (Formerly, Ibn Gazwan Hospital)
  - Al Fayhaa General Teaching
- General Hospitals
  - Om Qasir General Hospital (Om Al Maarik)
  - Al Zubair General Hospital
  - Al Midaina General Hospital
  - Al Qurna General Hospital (Saddamiya)
  - Al Fao General Hospital
  - Abu Al-Khaseeb General Hospital

Private Hospitals

- Mossawi hospital
- Mowasat hospital
- Al Saadi Private Hospital
- Al Noor Private Hospital
- Ibn Al Baitar Private Hospital
- Dar Alshifaa Private Hospital
- Al Mawada Private Hospital

== Dhi Qar ==
- Al-Hussein Teaching Hospital
- Al-Refaai General Hospital
- Souq Al-Sheyoukh General Hospital
- Al Shatera General Hospital
- Al Chebaiesh General Hospital
- Al Rabia Private Hospital
- Al Amal Private Hospital
- Al Habobi Specialized Hospital
- Bint Al Huda Maternity & Children Hospital
- Nasiriyah Heart Center
- Al-Rahman privet Hospital
- Al-Nasiriyah Teaching Hospital
- Mohammad AlMousawi Children Hospital

== Anbar ==
The following hospitals are located in the Al Anbar Governorate.

- Hit/Heet General Hospital
- Al-Faluja General Hospital
- Anah General Hospital
- Rawah General Hospital
- Haditha General Hospital
- Al Rutba General Hospital
- Al Qa'im General Hospital
- Al Ubaidi
- Gynaecology, Obstetrics & Children
- Al-Faris Al-Arabi
- Saddam Teaching Hospital
- Al Mustafa Private Hospital
- Apollo Hospitals

== Babil/Babel ==
The following hospitals are found in the Babil Governorate:

- Al Hilla Teaching Hospital
- Al Mahawil General Hospital
- Al Hashimiya General Hospital
- Al Musaib General Hospital
- AL Noor pediatric hospital
- Al Alexsandriay General Hospital
- Al Faiha' Private Hospital
- Al Hayat Private Hospital
- Babil Private Hospital
- Babel Maternity & Children
- Eben Saif Al Jenabi (Maternity & Children)
- Merjan Medical City for Internal Medicine and Cardiology
- Imam Sadiq Educational/Teaching Hospital
- Thi Alkifil teaching hospital

== Diyala ==
The following hospitals are in the Diyala Governorate:

- Ba'quba General Hospital, teaching hospital
- Al Muqdadiyah General Hospital
- Al Khales General Hospital
- Khaniqin General Hospitals
- Baladrus General Hospital
- Jalawlaa General Hospital (Al Shahid Muhamed Abdulah)
- Fevers Private Hospital
- Diyala Private Hospital
- Al Batool Maternity & Children Specialized Hospital
- Al Zahra'a Maternity & Children Specialized Hospital
- Al Razi Infectious Diseases Specialized Hospital
- Al-Shefa private specialized hospital

== Duhok ==
- Rozana Hospital
- Azadi Teaching Hospital (formerly Saddam Hussein Hospital, internal medicine)
- "Baroshki" Emergency Teaching Hospital (trauma, surgery)
- Hevi Pediatrics Teaching Hospital
- Zakho General Hospital
- Akre General Hospital
- Amadiya Hospital
- Duhok Burns and Plastic Surgery Hospital
- Vin hospital and medical complex
- Shilan Private Hospital
- Duhok Private Hospital
- Jiyan Private Hospital
- Par Hospital
- German Private Hospital (Duhok )
- Wan Global International Hospital

== Erbil ==
- Serdem Private Hospital
- Rapareen teaching Hospital for pediatrics, center (in Public sector)
- Maternity teaching Hospital, center (in Public sector)
- Rizgary teaching Hospital, center (in Public sector)
- West Emergency Hospital, center (in Public sector)
- East Emergency Hospital, center (in Public sector)
- Central Emergency Hospital, center (in Public sector)
- Nanakali Hospital for blood diseases and cancer, center (in Public sector)
- Hawler teaching Hospital, center (in Public sector)
- Hawler psychiatric teaching Hospital, center (in Public sector)
- Cardiac Center, center (in Public sector)
- Perman General Hospital, Permam district (in Public sector)
- Shaqlawa Hospital, Shaqlawa district (in Public sector)
- Shaheed Mulazim Kareem Hospital, Shaqlawa district, Salahaddin (in Public sector)
- Hareer Hospital, Shaqlawa district, Hareer (in Public sector)
- Soran general Hospital, Soran district, Diana (in Public sector)
- maternal and child Hospital, Soran district, Diana (in Public sector)
- Rawanduz Hospital, Soran district, Rawanduz (in Public sector)
- Choman Hospital, Choman (in Public sector)
- Mergasoor Hospital, Mergasoor district (in Public sector)
- Ble Hospital, Ble district, Barzan direc. (in Public sector)
- Zheen International Hospital (ZIH)
- ZANKO PRIVATE HOSPITAL
- CMC Private Hospital
- Swedish Specialist Hospital in Erbil
- Arbil Hospital, center
- Par Private Hospital
- Shar Private Hospital

== Kerbala/Karbala ==
The following hospitals are in the Kerbala Governorate:

- Al Hussain General Hospital, teaching hospital
- Ain Al Tamar General Hospital
- Al Hindiya General Hospital
- Specialized Pediatric Teaching Hospital
- Specialized Gynecology & Obstetric Teaching Hospital
- Private Alkafeel Super Specialized Hospital
- Zain Al Abdin Private Hospital
- Imam Al-Hujjah Hospital (private charity)
- Abbas Private Hospital
- Khatam Al Anbea'a Private Hospital (under construction in ?)
- Al Waeli Private Hospital (under construction in ?)

== Kirkuk ==
- Kirkuk General Hospital
- Azadi General Hospital
- General Hospitals Huzairan/for Ministry of Oil
- General Hospitals Al Hawija
- General Hospitals Al Wattan
- General Hospitals Al Taamem General
- General Hospitals Al-Daqoq
- Private Hospital Dar Al Hekmah Private
- Private Hospital Dar Al Salam Private
- Specialized Hospital Pediatric Hospital
- Kirkuk Military Hospital

== Maysan ==
- General Hospitals Al-Sadr General
- General Hospitals Ali Al Gharbi
- General Hospitals Qalaa Saleh
- General Hospitals Al Maimona
- General Hospitals Al Majar
- General Hospitals Al Humayyat (obsolete)
- Private Hospital Al Rahmah Private (obsolete)
- Specialized Hospital Al Zahrawi

== Al Muthanna ==
- Al-Hussain teaching hospital
- General Hospitals Al Rumatha
- General Hospitals Al Khedher
- Maternity & Children teaching Hospital

== Al Najaf ==
- General Hospitals Al Sader General Teaching
- General Hospitals Al-Furat Al-Awsat Teaching
- Najaf General Hospitals Al Najaf Teaching
- Najaf General Hospitals Al zahraa Teaching
- Al-manatherah general hospital
- Al-haidaria general hospital
- Al-amal hospital
- Al-meshkhab hospital
- Al-qadesia hospital

== Ninawa ==
- General Hospital Talla'fer (Telafer General Hospital)
- General Hospital Sinjar
- Sinuni General Hospital
- General Hospital Al Shikhan
- General Hospital Al Hamdania
- General Hospital Tellafer
- Private Hospital Al Rabi' Private
- Private Hospital Al Rahmah Private
- Private Hospital Ninawa Private
- Private Hospital Al Zahrawi Private
- Specialized Hospital Al Batool for Gynaecology & Obstetrics
- Specialized Hospital Eben Al Athir for Children (Ibn Alatheer)
- Specialized Hospital Al Khansaa Maternity & Children
- Specialized Hospital Al Kamaliya (Specialized)
- Specialized Hospital Hazem Al Hafez (Oncology and Nuclear Medicine)
- Teaching Hospital Saddam General Teaching, now called Al-Salam Teaching Hospital.
- Teaching Hospital Eben Sina Teaching (Ibn Seena Teaching Hospital)
- Teaching Hospital Al Zahrawi for Surgery Teaching (Al-Jamhuri Teaching Hospital)
- Mosul Military Hospital, now called Mosul General Hospital.
- Al Shifaa Hospital for Infectious Diseases

== Al Qadisiyyah ==
- General Hospitals Saddam General
- General Hospitals Al Shaheed Mahdi Tarrad
- General Hospitals Al Hamzah
- General Hospitals Al Shaheed Khalid Al Bider General Hospital
- General Hospitals Khalid Al-Bader
- General Hospitals Afek
- General Hospitals Al-Shamiya
- Private Hospital Al Diwaniah Private
- Private Hospital Al Shafaa Private
- Specialized Hospital Maternity and Children
- Specialized Hospital Fevers & Chest Diseases
- Specialized Hospital Infection Disease Hospital

== Salah ad Din ==
=== Samarra ===
- General Hospitals Samerraa

=== Tikrit ===
- General Hospital Salahuddin
- Dijlah Rehabilitation Centre/Prosthetics
- Tikrit Teaching Hospital
- General Hospital Dijlah

=== Baiji ===
- General Hospitals Beji

=== Balad ===
- General Hospitals Baled

=== Al-Sherqat ===
- General Hospitals Al Sherqat

=== Touzkhermato ===
- Tuze of General Hospital

== Sulaymaniyah ==
Governmental Hospitals:

- Sulaimanyah Teaching Hospital
- Sulaimanyah General Hospital
- Sulaimanyah Pediatric Hospital
- Sulaimanyah Gynecological and obstetric Hospital
- Shaheed Aso Eye Hospital
- Emergency Hospital
- Shorsh General Teaching Hospital
- Sulaimanyah Maternity Hospital
- Hewa Oncological Hospital
- Shar hospital (400 Bed)
- Kurdistan Gastrointestinal and hepatology center
- Sulaimanyah Cardiac catheterization center
- Sulaimanyah Cardiac surgery center
- Breast care center

Private Hospitals:

- Baxshin Private Hospital
- Faruk Medical City
- Anwar Sheikha medical city
- Sulaimanyah private Hospital
- Ashty private Hospital
- Kurdistan Private Hospital
- Tooemaleek Private Hospital
- Hatwan Private Hospital
- Harem Private Hospital
- Azmir Private Hospital
- Soma Private Hospital
- Keo private Hospital
- Zhyan Private Hospital

Safin Private Hospital

== Wasit ==
- General Hospitals Al Zahraa(previously:Saddam)General
- General Hospitals Al Karama
- General Hospitals Al Nu'maniya
- General Hospitals Al Hay
- General Hospitals Al Suwaira
- General Hospitals Al Kut Cooperative
- General Hospitals Al Azizia
- Private Hospital Eben Sina Private
- Specialized Hospital Al Kut Surgery (Emergency)
- Specialized Hospital Al Zahaf Al Kabeer Maternity
- Specialized Hospital Haj Jalal

== See also ==
- Al-'Adudi Hospital (981–1258)
- List of cities in Iraq
- List of neighborhoods and districts in Baghdad
- Iraqi Ministry of Health
