= Albu Shajal =

Village in Iraq

Albu Shajal (also: Albu Shejel, Albu Shijil) is a village in Iraq, which is located in the Al Anbar Governorate north west of the city of Fallujah between Habbaniyah and Saqlawiyah, on the north bank of the river Euphrates.

In February 2016, during the Anbar offensive, the village was recaptured by the Iraqi army from ISIL, dozens of ISIL militants were killed during the operation. On 29 May 2016, during Operation Breaking Terrorism, the Iraqi forces reportedly repelled an ISIL attack on Albu Shajal, killing "dozens" of militants.
