= Anbar campaign (2015–2016) =

Military campaign

- Part of the War in Iraq (2013–2017)
- Location of the Al Anbar Governorate in Iraq
Date	July 13, 2015 – 30 June 2016 (11 months, 2 weeks and 3 days)
Location	Anbar Governorate, Iraq
Result	Major Iraqi Government victory
Territorial changes	The Iraqi Army recaptures Ramadi, Hīt, Ar-Rutbah, and Fallujah from ISIL.; 20 percent of the Anbar Province, and 25 percent of Anbar's population remained under ISIL control

Belligerents
Iraq: Iraqi security forces; Armed Forces; Federal Police; Local Sunni tribes; Shia militias (not directly involved); Support: United States; Air support: United States; United Kingdom; Australia; France; Canada	Islamic State of Iraq and the Levant

Commanders and leaders
(Iraq) Safaa Al-Sarai †	Abu Bakr al-Baghdadi (Leader); Abu Mohammad al-Adnani (ISIL Spokesman); Abu Omar al-Shishani † (Military Chief); Dohan al-Rawi † (ISIL War Minister); Abu Waheeb † (Top ISIL Commander in Anbar); Khaled al-Sadoun † (ISIL Governor of Anbar Province) Abu Bakr (POW) (Top ISIL commander in Ramadi)

Units involved
Quwat al-Shaheed al-Sadr al-Awal; Saraya al-Jihad Harakat Ahrar al-Iraq	Military of ISIL

Strength
13,000+ fighters: 2,500+ Iraqi tribal fighters; 3,000+ Shi'ite militiamen (Not involved in Ramadi city)	Several thousand fighters

Casualties and losses
6,000–19,000 killed	150,00–42,555 killed
- 15+ civilians killed 505,300+ civilians displaced 143+ civilians killed

The Anbar campaign (2015–2016) was a military campaign launched by the Iraqi Armed Forces and their allies aimed at recapturing areas of the Anbar Governorate held by the Islamic State of Iraq and the Levant (ISIL), including the city of Ramadi, which ISIL seized earlier in 2015. The United States and other nations aided Iraq with airstrikes.

== Background ==
On May 17, 2015, ISIL captured the city of Ramadi, after launching an assault which included mortars, rockets, multiple waves of suicide attacks with vehicles, and other indirect fire during a sandstorm. This heavy pressure killed an estimated 500, and caused Iraqi forces to retreat from the city.

Reacting to the setback, the Iraqi government publicly announced an operation to retake Anbar province. On 26 May 2015, it launched a coordinated offensive combining army units, paramilitary forces (including the mainly‐Shiite Hashd al‑Shaabi), Sunni tribal fighters and local police to reclaim lost ground. Thus the Anbar campaign officially commenced in 2015.

== The offensive ==
=== Initial assault ===
On the dawn of July 13, the Iraqi Army, backed by the Shiite and Sunni pro-government militias, launched an assault on several fronts in Anbar, including on Ramadi. According to the police sources in the province, the Iraqi forces pushed towards Ramadi from the west and the south. According to ISIL supporters, the advances of the Iraqi forces were repelled by militants. By the afternoon, the Iraqi Army retook the Ramadi Olympic stadium in western Ramadi and reached the eastern part of the city. According to Iraqi officials, pro-government fighters also pushed the extremists from the areas east of Ramadi. On July 20, the Olympic stadium was destroyed by ISIL militants with remotely detonated explosives. According to military officials said that there may have been number of Shiite militia fighters may have been inside the stadium at the time of its destruction, but they did not offer casualty figures. On July 23, Iraqi government announced that it had deployed United States-trained Iraqi troops for the first time to retake Ramadi. The Shiite militia commanders said that currently the initial main focus was on retaking Fallujah rather than Ramadi and the Iraqi government indicated that will not be used to liberate Ramadi. On July 26, pro-government forces took back the complete control of University of Anbar from ISIL fighters. It was retaken by forces from Iraq's Counter Terrorism Services with support from the Iraqi army and air support from the international coalition and Iraqi aircraft. On July 29, 12 Iraqi soldiers were killed when ISIL suicide attackers rammed 2 explosive-laden Humvees into forces deployed outside the university's compound.

On August 11, a senior official with the US-led Coalition said that Iraqi forces had surrounded the city and were preparing for a final assault to retake it. On August 23, 23 Iraqi soldiers including 17 Iraqi military soldiers and 6 allied Sunni fighters were killed by ISIL in an attack that involved the use of suicide bombers and artillery. On August 25, Iraqi forces repelled an ISIL suicide attack west of Ramadi by destroying three booby-trapped vehicles and killing everyone inside them. On August 27, 2 Iraqi army generals and 3 soldiers were killed in a suicide attack while 10 other soldiers were wounded. On September 10, an airstrike by the US-led coalition destroyed an ISIL operating base and staging area in a stadium near Ramadi. On September 15, it was reported that a force of 160 US troops had arrived at Habbaniyah air base and were expected to help the Iraqi army retake Ramadi. The unconfirmed reports also claimed that USA agreed to take part in ground combat against ISIL if the Popular Front forces withdrew from Anbar. However, these reports were dismissed by an Iraqi army spokesman who said that the US troops at the air base were there to simply provide military advice and coordinate raids against ISIL targets. Popular Front spokesman Karim Al-Nouri also dismissed these reports saying that the Popular Front militia was still deployed in Anbar.

=== Offensive stalls ===
By late September, the operation to retake Ramadi was considered to have stalled, with Iraqi security forces positioned on the outskirts of Ramadi, but unable to mount an incursion into the city. Political squabbles between Iranian backed militias and the Abadi administration were also hampering potential offensives. On September 25, the United States urged the Iraqi Army to hasten the operation, acknowledging that "...the Iraqis have not made any significant forward movement recently".

=== Renewed operations ===
On October 7, Iraqi forces renewed their operations in Ramadi, capturing several areas to the north and west, including the main road west of Ramadi. By October 13, Iraqi troops had advanced 15 kilometers and encircled the city according to US officials. Further Iraqi military reinforcements including artillery batteries and tanks arrived in the nearby town of Khaldiyah on November 10, in preparation for another assault on Ramadi. Iraqi forces recaptured the emergency directorate headquarters in Ramadi on November 14.

=== Battle for Ramadi ===
On November 25, Iraqi forces launched the offensive to recapture Ramadi, cutting ISIL's last supply line into the city of Ramadi, via the Euphrates River, by seizing the strategic Palestine Bridge.

On December 8, Iraqi forces pushed into the city, and Iraqi forces captured Tamin, a key district in the south-western area of Ramadi. The Iraqi Army also recaptured the Anbar Operation Control Center, near the Palestine Bridge. On December 10, ISIL forces blew up the Warrar Dam, which linked the Anbar Operations Control Center to northwestern Ramadi city, leaving the Qassim Bridge as the last working bridge in Ramadi.

On December 22, Iraqi forces advanced into the center of the city of Ramadi, and headed towards the main government complex. The attack was launched from al-Tamim and al-Humaira Districts in the southwest and south, northwards on 3 axes into the central al-Hoz District, and the Andalus and al-Malab Districts further east. On December 27, the Iraqi Army captured the government complex, after which they declared victory in Ramadi, and claimed to be in full control of the city center. However, on the following day, it was confirmed ISIL was still in control of 30 percent of the city. On December 30, 2015, the Iraqi Prime Minister visited Ramadi and raised the Iraqi flag at the government complex. ISIL casualties during the battle were reportedly high, while Iraqi Army casualties were low.

On January 3, 2016, the Iraqi Government declared that it had recaptured 80% of Ramadi city, and that the only pockets of ISIL resistance remaining were located in the al-Malab and 20th Street areas of the city. On January 20, the city of Ramadi was reportedly cleared of ISIL forces, after over 6 months of fighting. Iraqi forces began moving eastward to Khalidiya Island, after clearing ISIL-held neighborhoods near the area. On January 21, US Vice President Joe Biden congratulated the Iraqi Security Forces for liberating the city of Ramadi from ISIL control, during a meeting with Iraqi Prime Minister al-Abadi.

On January 22, Iraqi forces fully entered the Sajjariyah District, and they also entered the ISIL-held areas in the Joabah and Husaiyah Districts, to the east of Ramadi. On January 23, ISIL launched suicide attacks in the Kilo 70 area west of Ramadi, and in the Tal Msheheidah east of Ramadi, as well as areas to the north of Ramadi; the ensuing clashes and airstrikes led to the deaths of 62 ISIL militants and 48 Iraqi fighters. On January 24, Iraqi Defense Minister said that the Iraqi Army was preparing for an offensive on Mosul, stating that the Iraqi Army and Coalition forces had defeated ISIL in Ramadi. Later on the same day, 190 people suspected of collaborating with ISIL were arrested in Ramadi, even as fighting shifted to the Husaiybah District, to the east of Ramadi. On January 26, the Iraqi Army found and destroyed the ISIL headquarters in eastern Ramadi, in the al-Sofiyah District, killing at least 6 ISIL militants.

During the next week, as the Iraqi Army closed in on the Sajjariyah District, the last area in Ramadi held by ISIL, ISIL launched multiple waves of suicide attacks in the Ramadi area, killing dozens of Iraqi soldiers. On February 4, 2016, the Iraqi Army recaptured the Sajjariyah District, fully expelling ISIL from Ramadi. The 2015–2016 Battle of Ramadi was the first time since the Fall of Mosul in which the Iraqi Army played the primary role in combating ISIL.

=== Khalidiya Island offensive ===
On February 1, the Iraqi Army launched an offensive on the Khalidiya Island area, which is the region located between the villages Albu Nasir and Albu Shajal, situated between Ramadi and Fallujah. On the same day, the Iraqi Army managed to capture the villages of Albu Shalib and Albu Shajal, to the northwest of Fallujah. On February 2, the Iraqi Army fully severed the last supply lines between the Khalidiya Island region and the city of Fallujah, completely besieging the city. This led to concerns that an estimated 30,000 civilians trapped in Fallujah would starve, due to the lack of airdropped supplies into the city. On February 4, after Ramadi city was recaptured from ISIL, offensive operations shifted further eastward to the Khalidiya Island area.

On February 8, the Iraqi Army recaptured the Juwaybah District, to the east of Ramadi, east of the Sajjariyah District. On February 9, Iraqi forces entered the center of Husaiybah, the last ISIL-held village to the east of Ramadi. Later on the same day, the Iraqi Army fully recaptured the Husaiybah Al-Sharqiyah District, about 10 kilometers (6 miles) east of Ramadi, thus fully expelling ISIL from the environs of Ramadi. Dozens of ISIL militants were killed in the clashes in Husaiybah. The Iraqi Army also began evacuating 1,500 civilians from the Husaiybah Al-Sharqiyah District. Afterwards, the Iraqi Government reopened the Ramadi-Habbaniyah Highway. ISIL militants were still holed up in some farmlands in Khalidiya Island, to the north of the town of Al Khalidiya. On February 10, it was reported that the Iraqi Army had fully recaptured the Khalidiya District, including the Khalidiya Island area, but there was renewed fighting in Khalidiya Island area since March 2016. Because there was still resistance in the area, the army started a new offensive on May 25, 2016.

On February 14, an Iraqi airstrike killed an ISIL commander in the Kartan area of the Khalidiya District, along with 14 other ISIL militants. Later on the same day, the Iraqi Government reported that the Sedikiyah area in the eastern Khalidiya District was ready for the return of displaced civilians, after IEDs left behind by ISIL in the area had been dismantled. On February 16, the Iraqi Army launched a clearing operation in the Hamidiyah District, to the northeast of Ramadi's Albu Ghanem District. On February 19, the Iraqi Army completely cleared the Hamidiyah District from ISIL forces, killing dozens of ISIL fighters. On February 21, the US-led Coalition bombed an ISIL gathering in Khalidiya Island, killing 7 ISIL leaders.

=== Siege of Fallujah ===
From February 15 to 19, the Iraqi Army launched an offensive into the town of Al-Karmah, to the northeast of Fallujah, killing dozens of ISIL militants.

On February 18, a large number of local Sunni tribesmen revolted against ISIL, after ISIL beat a woman, among other restrictive practices enforces by ISIL's Al-Hisbah secret police, amid an ongoing siege. ISIL was reported to have withdrawn into Fallujah city, after local Sunnis burned the Al-Hisbah headquarters and clashes spread. On February 20, the clashes began to die down as ISIL began carrying out mass arrests, and it was reported that there were still some Sunni fighters who were pinned down in parts of Fallujah, who would likely be massacred if the Iraqi Government or the US-led Coalition does not intervene. On February 21, the Iraqi Army began shelling ISIL positions on the outskirts of Fallujah, in support of the Sunni tribal fighters. Late on February 21, ISIL crushed the revolt, and detained 180 men. However, on the same day, the Iraqi Army deployed reinforcements to Fallujah, in preparation to storm the city.

On February 23, the Iraqi Army fully recaptured the town of Al-Karmah, after they destroyed ISIL's last stronghold in the town. On February 25, the Iraqi Governor of Anbar stated that the battle for Fallujah would begin soon, and that it would be much shorter than the battle for Ramadi.

On February 27, the Iraqi Government reported that 600 ISIL fighters had managed to flee Fallujah to nearby areas, and to the city of Mosul. On February 28, the Shi'ite militia forces repelled an ISIL attack on Al-Karmah, which was described as one of the largest attacks on the town. Later on the same day, Iraqi government forces repelled a massive ISIL suicide attack in Abu Ghraib and western Baghdad, which was the largest attack carried out by the group in the area in nearly 2 years. The assault left 30 ISIL militants and 30 Iraqi soldiers dead. The Iraqi army carried out an offensive on the city of Fallujah liberated the hospital and captured al-Karmah on May 23, 2016. On June 26, 2016, the Iraqi Army liberated Al-Fallujah after liberating the last ISIS held neighborhood of Al-Jolan.

=== Hīt offensive ===
On February 19, it was revealed that the next target of Iraqi operations in the Anbar Province was going to be the town of Hīt, with an estimated 12,000 civilians and 300–400 ISIL militants in the town, and many more ISIL militants in the surrounding area. On February 23, the Iraqi government deployed reinforcements to the Ain al-Assad airbase near Hīt, in preparation for a future offensive to recapture both Kabisa and the Hīt District from ISIL. On the same day, clashes erupted between local Sunni tribesmen and ISIL forces in the Hīt District. On the next day, the US-led Coalition destroyed the ISIL headquarters in Hīt and Kabisa, killing multiple ISIL militants. On February 28, the Iraqi government warned the civilians in Kabisa and the Hīt District to leave within 48 hours, to avoid an imminent offensive to recapture those areas.

On March 12, the Iraqi Government launched the offensive to recapture the Hīt District, also known as Operation Desert Lynx. On the same day, U.S.-led Coalition forces conducted several airstrikes within Hīt, killing a number of ISIL leaders and militants, which Iraqi officials confirmed.

On March 17, Iraqi Security Forces and their allies drove ISIL forces out of al-Mohammadi, located southeast of Hīt. On March 21, the Iraqi Army came within 1 kilometer of the eastern outskirts of Hīt. On the same day, Iraqi forces paused offensive operations, to give the remaining civilians in the district time to flee. On March 19, the Iraqi Army recaptured the town of Kabisa, to the west-southwest of Hīt.

On April 1, the Iraqi Army recaptured the northern edge of the city. The offensive was reported to have been delayed earlier, because hundreds of roadside bombs littering the surrounding area slowed progress for days. Furthermore, it was reported that a significant number of troops had been pulled out of Al Anbar Governorate earlier to protect protesters in Baghdad, which also resulted in delays.

On April 5, it was reported that the Iraqi Security Forces had recaptured more than 70% of the Hīt District. The state TV reported a local commander saying that the military had routed ISIL from the city, but that fighting was still going on. The Iraqi Army's control of the town appeared to be incomplete and fragile. An Iraqi commander informed that the insurgents had tried to retake a main street but were repelled. Iraqi forces also managed to seize the government compound and raised the Iraqi flag on a main building, after ISIL militants withdrew from the downtown and eastern part of the town.

On April 8, Iraqi forces recaptured the Hit town center, and expelled ISIL forces from most of the city, but fighting still continued in the city. At least 30 Iraqi soldiers were killed, and more than 50 were wounded in the clashes.

On April 14, Iraqi forces fully recaptured the town of Hīt, along with the remainder of the Hīt District.

=== Ar-Rutbah offensive ===
On March 13, a senior Iraqi general reported that ISIL has fully withdrawn from the city of Ar-Rutbah to Al-Qa'im, after they began leaving the night before. The withdrawal was confirmed by a member of Anbar's security council. It was also reported that ISIL had abandoned the town of Kabisa as well, and they had also withdrawn from Hīt to some degree, with Iraqi warplanes bombing the retreating militants. This was the first time that ISIL has withdrawn from a major urban area without an actual fight, and the retreat came after recent losses on the battlefield for ISIL in Syria and in the Anbar Province, including a recent offensive on Hīt. However, ISIL returned to the town on the following day.

On May 16, the Iraqi Army launched an offensive to recapture the town of Ar-Rutbah, and the rest of the Ar-Rutba District. The Iraqi Army attacked the town from three directions. A US official stated that Ar-Rutbah wasn't as well defended by ISIL as Ramadi or Fallujah, and that there were 100 to several hundred ISIL militants based in the town. On May 17, the Iraqi Army fully recaptured Ar-Rutbah, and the surrounding areas in the Ar-Rutbah District. During the clashes, at least 4 Iraqi soldiers were killed and 5 more were wounded, and around 100 ISIL fighters were killed.

=== Battle of Fallujah ===
On May 22, 2016, the Iraqi Army published a statement and asked residents of the battlefield to leave the area through secured routes. The Iraqi Army also said that local residents who could not move should raise white flags on top of their roofs.

Haider al-Abadi ordered to beginning the operation on the early Monday of 23 May. "The Iraqi flag will be raised high over the land of Fallujah." al-Abadi said. On May 23, 2016, it was reported the city of Al-Karmah was recaptured by Shiite militias of PMF. Photos published by a PMF media shows Iran's Quds Force commander Qasem Soleimani and other PMF commanders discussing Fallujah battle strategies. On the first day of the offensive 11 further villages and districts near Fallujah were recaptured, which forced ISIL fighters to retreat to the interior of the strategically important city. The offensive was slowed down because in the outskirts hundreds of improvised explosive devices were found.

The Popular Mobilization Forces declared on 23 May that they had captured Al-Karmah, about 16 kilometers (10 miles) northeast of Falluja, which brings most of the territory east of Falluja under government control. They also announced the liberation of al-Harariyat, al-Shahabi and al-Dwaya and the killing of 40 ISIL militants during the military operation. Iraqi government announced that pro-government fighters had captured the villages of Luhaib and Albu Khanfar on 24 May.

On 25 May, 16 villages and districts on the eastern outskirts of Fallujah were cleared by the Iraqi Security Forces. Included in this were the gains from a column in the North-East, which liberated the town of Sejar days after the capture of Al-Karmah. These clashes resulted in the death of 40 ISIL militants. An additional 163 ISIL militants, 15 civilians and 35 Iraqi forces and militiamen were killed in clashes which gained the Iraqi army control over the remaining districts in the South-East, allowing them to create a corridor that cut the ISIL-controlled-zone in two. During the day, it was reported an Iranian Basij member was killed in fighting near Fallujah. According to Qasm Araji, a member of the defense committee, the advancing forces are continuously gaining ground and "nearing Fallujah's Eastern gate."

On 27 May, the US-led coalition conducted airstrikes in and around the city. US-led coalition air and artillery strikes airstrikes in and around Fallujah killed 70 ISIS fighters in Fallujah, including the top commander in the area, Maher Al-Bilawi On 28 May, the Iraqi Army declared the start of an operation to liberate Fallujah's city center, considered to be ISIL's stronghold in the western province of Anbar.

Early on 30 May, the Iraqi forces began entering the city of Fallujah from 3 directions, and captured the village of Saqlawiyah. However, the Iraqi forces faced very stiff resistance from the ISIL forces inside of the city, slowing their advance. By June 26, Fallujah had been declared "fully liberated" by the Iraqi army.

From June 29 to 30, the US-led Coalition and the Iraqi Air Force bombed large convoys of ISIL vehicles fleeing the Ramadi, Khalidiya Island, and Fallujah areas, after ISIL's recent defeat in Fallujah. The airstrikes destroyed over 150 vehicles and killed at least 360 ISIL militants.

== Aftermath ==
Iraqi Army along with the local tribes launched a new offensive on 5 January 2017 to capture the remaining areas under ISIL control in Anbar with the main targets being the towns of Aanah, Rawa and Al-Qaim. The operation was however suspended after retaking of Sagra and Zawiya because of preparations for recapturing the western bank of Mosul. Iraqi forces began a new offensive to dislodge the group from the area along the border in September 2017.

== See also ==
- Military intervention against ISIL
  - American-led intervention in Syria
- Fall of Mosul
- First Battle of Tikrit
- Siege of Amirli
- Sinjar massacre
- Siege of Fallujah
- Siege of Kobanî
- Fall of Hīt (2014)
- Derna campaign (2014–2016)
- Battle of Baiji (October–December 2014)
- Battle of Baiji (2014–2015)
- December 2014 Sinjar offensive
- Mosul offensive (2015)
- Second Battle of Tikrit (March–April 2015)
- Al-Hawl offensive
- November 2015 Sinjar offensive
- Tishrin Dam offensive
- Al-Shaddadi offensive (2016)
- List of wars and battles involving ISIL
- Anbar campaign (2017)
