= Ministry of Health (Iraq) =

Government ministry of Iraq

Republic of IraqMinistry of Health
- وزارة الصحة

Agency overview
- Formed: 1920
- Jurisdiction: Government of Iraq
- Headquarters: Baghdad (Iraq)
- Agency executive: Abdul-Hussein al-Mousawi
- Website: Official website

The Ministry of Health is a central government ministry of Iraq tasked to provide health and medical services to every Iraqi citizen in normal times as well as times of emergency.

Since 14 May 2026 the minister of health is Abdul-Hussein al-Mousawi.

== Vision ==
The Ministry's mission is to respond to the needs of the public regarding healthcare services by developing organisational structures that facilitate sustainability and decentralisation. Additionally, the Ministry delivers and develops policies, strategies, regulations, laws and frameworks in order to improve and reform the healthcare system. Furthermore, the Ministry works to establish a healthy working environment that encourages continuous professional development. Finally, the Ministry seeks to improve scientific research output for the purpose of promoting the healthcare services in Iraq.

== Organizational structure ==
- First Deputy
  - Blood Transfusion Center
  - Health Education Dept.
  - Finance & Auditing Dept.
- Second Deputy
  - Liver Center
  - Cosmetics Center
  - Heart Center
  - Cancer Center
  - Forensic Medicine
  - International Health Dept
  - Diabetes Center
  - Poisoning Info. Center
  - Bone Marrow Center
  - Impotence Center
- Popular Clinic Directorate
- Baghdad Health Directorate / Rusafa
- Baghdad Health Directorate / Karkh
- Saddam Medical City Directorate
- Yarmouk Medical Directorate
- Directorates of Health in all Governorates
- Directorate of Health Planning
  - Manpower Dept
  - Nursing Dept.
  - Statistics Dept.
  - Finance & Planning Dept
  - Training of Staff Dept.
  - Training of Staff Dept.
  - Building Planning Dept.
  - Self finances Dept.
- Technical Affair Directorate
  - Laboratory Dept.
  - Pharmacy Dept.
  - Oral Health Dept.
  - Medical Committee Dept.
  - Curative Dept.
  - Quality Control Dept.
  - Consultation Dept.
- Admin & Legal Affairs
  - Legal Dept.
  - Administration Dept.
  - Finance Dept.
  - Personnel Dept.
- KIMADIA Company
  - Planning Dept.
  - Admin. Dept.
  - Drug Dist. Dept.
  - Drug Information Dept.
  - Finance Dept.
  - Printing Dept.
  - Technical Dept.
  - Vaccine & Sera Dept.
  - Equipment Dist. Dept.
  - Legal Dept.
  - Warehouses Dept.
  - Import Dept.
  - Repair Dept.
- Inspection
  - Governmental Fac. Dept.
  - Non Governmental Fac. Dept.
  - Claims Dept.
  - Evaluation Dept.
  - Drug & Equipment Dept.
  - Technical Dept.
  - Industrial Security Dept.
- Prevention
  - Public Health Lab.
  - PHC
  - Nutrient Dept.
  - Health Inspection Dept.
  - Aids Center
  - CDC

== See also ==
- Ministry of Health (Kurdistan)
- List of hospitals in Iraq
- The New Iraqi Journal of Medicine
