= Battle of Hit (2016) =

Iraqi offensive to capture the town of Hīt

- Part of the War in Iraq and the Anbar campaign (2015–16)
Date	12 March – 14 April 2016 (1 month and 2 days)
Location	Hīt District, Anbar Governorate, Iraq
Status	Iraqi government victory: Iraqi forces recapture the town of Kabisa, Hīt, and the Hīt District from ISIL

Belligerents
Iraq: Iraqi security forces; Armed Forces; Federal Police; Local Sunni tribes; Shi'ite militias; Air support: United States; United Kingdom; Australia	Islamic State of Iraq and the Levant

Commanders and leaders
Haider al-Abadi (Prime Minister of Iraq); Suhaib al-Rawi (Governor of Anbar); Mohanad Zbar (Mayor of Hīt district)	Raed Mounir al-Zubaidi † (Top ISIL commander of Hīt District) Isaq al-Libyan † (ISIL commander of Kabisa District)

Strength
5,000+ fighters (two brigades)	1,000+ fighters (300–400 fighters in Hīt)

Casualties and losses
62+ killed, 50+ wounded	339+ killed 40 arrested
- 5 civilians executed by ISIL
- 25,000 civilians trapped in Hīt, another 20,000 fled the Hīt District; 1,500+ civilians evacuated

The Battle of Hit, code named Operation Desert Lynx by Iraqi forces, was an offensive launched by the Iraqi Government during the Anbar offensive, with the goal of recapturing the town of Hīt and the Hīt District from ISIL. After the Iraqi forces recaptured the city of Ramadi, Hīt and Fallujah were the only cities still under the control of ISIL in the Al Anbar Governorate. Iraqi Forces fully recaptured Hīt and the rest of the Hīt District on 14 April 2016.

== Background ==
On 19 February, it was revealed that the next target of Iraqi operations in the Anbar Province the town of Hīt, with an estimated 12,000 civilians and 300–400 ISIL militants in the town, and many more ISIL militants in the surrounding area. On 23 February, the Iraqi government deployed reinforcements to the Al Asad Airbase near Hīt, in preparation for a future offensive to recapture both Kabisa and the Hīt District from ISIL. On the same day, clashes erupted between local Sunni tribesmen and ISIL forces in the Hīt District. On the next day, the US-led Coalition destroyed the ISIL headquarters in Hīt and Kabisa, killing multiple ISIL militants. On 28 February, the Iraqi government warned the civilians in Kabisa and the Hīt District to leave within 48 hours, to avoid an imminent offensive to recapture those areas. On 8 March, ISIL forces abandoned the Zankourah district, without any resistance against Iraqi government fighters.

== The offensive ==
On 12 March, the Iraqi Government launched the offensive to recapture the Hīt District from ISIL. On the same day, U.S.-led Coalition forces conducted several airstrikes within Hīt, killing a number of ISIL leaders and militants, which Iraqi officials confirmed.

On 13 March, ISIL reportedly pulled out most of its fighters from the Hīt area, on which security forces were advancing, a military spokesman said. “The majority of Daesh (ISIS) fighters in Hīt, Rutba and Kubaysa have fled through the desert to other regions,” Yahya Rasool, Iraq’s top security spokesman, told the press. Earlier, an army general and a mayor said that ISIL had also pulled its fighters out of Ar-Rutba, a desert town in Anbar, and headed to al-Qaim.

On 14 March, an armed group of young people in Hīt district opened fire on a detachment belonging to ISIL, near a house inhabited by ISIL members, killing six ISIL members and burning their vehicle.

On 17 March, Iraqi Security Forces and allied Sunni tribal paramilitary units, backed by Iraqi aircraft, fought with ISIL militants and drove them out of al-Mohammadi, which is located northwest of Ramadi and southeast of Hīt. Sources said that Iraqi soldiers killed at least 21 militants in the battles, and raised the Iraqi flag on a building in the village. Meanwhile, more troops and Sunni tribal units, backed by U.S.-led coalition and Iraqi aircraft, advanced during the day in two routes from the Al Asad Airbase, towards Hīt and the nearby town of Kabisa.

On 19 March, the Iraqi Army recaptured the town of Kabisa, to the west-southwest of Hīt. On the same day, ISIL beheaded 5 civilians, considering them to be Iraqi government spies, in front of their families.

On 20 March, according to Al-Manar, at least 20 ISIL fighters were killed during a battle with Iraqi forces near Hīt.

On 21 March, the Iraqi Army came within 1 kilometer of the eastern outskirts of Hīt. On the same day, Iraqi forces paused offensive operations, to give the remaining civilians in the district time to flee.

On 22 March, at least 10,000 residents of Hīt abandoned the city, with another estimated 25,000 still left inside it.

Between 25–30 March, the US-led Coalition, launched 17 airstrikes against ISIL positions, in and around Hīt.

On 31 March 17 ISIL militants were killed in the Hīt by Coalition airstrikes. Eight Iraqi soldiers were also killed after an ISIL suicide car bomber detonated explosives, near an Iraqi Army convoy advancing towards the town of Hīt. The Iraqi Army managed to recapture areas to the south and west of Hīt on the same day. A security source announced that another 60 ISIL militants were killed in an aerial bombing by Iraqi F-16 fighter jets on their strongholds and gatherings, in the districts of Sharqat and Hīt.

On 1 April, the Iraqi Army recaptured the northern edge of the city. The offensive was reported to have been delayed earlier, because hundreds of roadside bombs littering the surrounding area slowed progress for days. The Iraqi troops worked to encircle the city. Furthermore, it was reported that a significant number of troops had been pulled out of Al Anbar Governorate earlier to protect protesters in Baghdad, which also resulted in delays.

On 2 April, Iraqi Government forces carried out a string of counter-terrorism operations in close proximity to the town of Hīt, and managed to recapture the regions of Basateen, Mourour, Saklat, and Askari. Nearly 100 ISIL fighters and 15 Iraqi soldiers were killed during the offensive. Iraqi fighter jets also bombed an ISIL base and killed 13 terrorists elsewhere in Anbar, while a weapons depot and a tunnel were destroyed in the al-Sen and Tal al-Marg Districts of Hīt. Iraqi Security Forces and allied paramilitary Sunni tribal fighters and managed to seize the al-Ma'mil District on the eastern edge of the town, after heavy clashes with ISIL militants. Iraqi troops killed 14 ISIL militants and destroyed a booby-trapped vehicle during the clashes, which also resulted in the killing of three soldiers and the wounding of four others.

On 2 April, Iraqi officials reported, that around 1,500 prisoners, mostly civilians, were freed from an ISIL underground prison near Hīt. This was denied a day later by Major General Ali Ibrahim Daboun, the army commander responsible for the area. He said that no prison was found, but that civilians, mostly families, had been "evacuated" from Hīt. Other officials confirmed that. On 3 April, Iraqi forces recaptured the Hīt Training Camp from ISIL, along with the surrounding areas, reducing ISIL control of the Hīt District to the town of Hīt.

On 5 April, it was reported that the Iraqi Security Forces had recaptured more than 70% of the Hīt District. The state TV reported a local commander saying that the military had routed ISIL from the city, but that fighting was still going on. The Iraqi Army's control of the town appeared to be incomplete and fragile. An Iraqi commander informed that the insurgents had tried to retake a main street but were repelled. Iraqi forces also managed to seize the government compound and raised the Iraqi flag on a main building, after ISIL militants withdrew from the downtown and eastern part of the town.

On 8 April, Iraqi forces recaptured the Hit town center, and expelled ISIL forces from most of the city, but fighting still continued in the city. At least 30 Iraqi soldiers were killed, and more than 50 were wounded in the clashes.

On 10 April, Iraqi soldiers took control of the Al-Qal'a and Ummal Districts. Six Iraqi soldiers were killed, and 13 others were injured during one incident, as eight landmines exploded while an Iraqi Army convoy was passing through Hamam Street in central Hīt, destroying four military vehicles. US-Coalition warplanes also bombarded an ISIL post in the area of Gesierat, close to the town of Khan al-Baghdadi, killing 16 ISIL militants.

On 11 April, Iraqi forces had raised the Iraqi flag over the local municipal building, and confirmed they were in complete control of the city center. Abdul Ghani al-Assadi, head of Iraq's Counter-Terrorism Service claimed that they were in complete control of the town. He said his forces still needed to clear a few neighborhoods where fighting was ongoing, but insisted that the ISIL militants were fleeing.

On 12 April, Iraqi Security Forces managed to recapture the Hīt Teaching Hospital and the al-Jamayia neighborhood in central Hīt, after fierce battles against ISIL fighters, resulting in the killing of 40 ISIL fighters. On the same day, the commander of the 3rd special operations brigade in the Anti-Terrorism Directorate Sami Kadim al-Aredi announced the liberation of al-Zohour, al-Qadisiyyah, and al-Shohada neighbourhoods in Hīt, with the backing by the Iraqi Army's 16th Brigade. Commander of Anbar Operations Command, Maj. Gen. Ismail al-Mahalawi, announced the killing of four ISIL militants, including a suicide bomber, in the Hīt District on the same day.

On 13 April 33 ISIL militants were killed during an operation to liberate a neighborhood in central Hīt. British warplanes carried out airstrikes on the same day that helped in destroying one of the last remaining strongpoints of the militants on the eastern outskirts of the town and struck an ISIL machine-gun position. The airstrikes allowed Iraqi forces to enter the town's hospital where they found a booby-trapped ambulance which was later destroyed by RAF jets.

On 14 April, Iraqi forces fully recaptured the town of Hīt, along with the remainder of the Hīt District. British warplanes destroyed boats that were being used to evacuate ISIL fighters from the town.

== Aftermath ==
40 ISIL members who were trying to escape from the town were arrested by Iraqi security forces on 16 April. On 23 April, Iraqi army liberated the Albu Naim area to the west of the Hīt District. Dozens of ISIL militants were killed during the operation.

On 29 April, Iraqi security forces and allied paramilitary Sunni tribal units, backed by Iraqi and U.S.-led coalition aircraft, freed the villages of Khazraj and Nuwy'im in west of the town of Heet, resulting in the killing of 13 IS militants and two soldiers and the wounding of five others. Meanwhile, Iraqi troops killed another suicide bomber wearing an explosive vest near the police station in the town of Kubaisa. Also on the same day, Islamic State has issued a news release claiming to have carried out a suicide attack on a police station in the same town, killing over 50 police officers and soldiers. According to the terrorist group’s statement, four ISIS militants attacked the station; two detonated their explosives and two returned to ISIS headquarters.

On the afternoon of 2 May, US-led Coalition aircraft bombed ISIL gatherings and strongholds in the Falij al-Sharqiya area in the Hīt District, killing 11 ISIL members. Iraqi Security Forces were able to dismantle 200 explosive devices in the eastern axis of the Hīt District, as well as destroying a 23 mm machine gun and a rocket launcher.

On 8 October, the Iraqi Army’s Seventh Division as well as the police and tribal forces managed to liberate the villages of Ebla, Abu al-Ela, al-Sawer and al-Judafiya near Khan al Baghdadi, killing of 23 ISIL militants.

== See also ==
- Al-Hawl offensive
- Battle of Baiji (2014–15)
- Battle of Baiji (October–December 2014)
- December 2014 Sinjar offensive
- Derna Campaign (2014–15)
- Fall of Hīt (2014)
- Fall of Mosul
- First Battle of Tikrit
- List of wars and battles involving ISIL
- Military intervention against ISIL
  - American-led intervention in Syria
- Mosul offensive (2015)
- November 2015 Sinjar offensive
- Second Battle of Tikrit (March–April 2015)
- Siege of Amirli
- Siege of Kobanî
- Sinjar massacre
- Tishrin Dam offensive
- Siege of Fallujah (2016)
- Al-Shaddadi offensive (2016)
- Mosul offensive (2016)
- Ar-Rutbah offensive (2016)
- List of wars and battles involving ISIL
