= Battle of Fallujah =

Battle of Fallujah may refer to:

- Capture of Fallujah (1917), by British forces during the Mesopotamian campaign of World War I
- 1941 Battle of Fallujah during the Anglo-Iraqi War
- First Battle of Fallujah, April 2004 operation by US forces against Iraqi guerillas
- Second Battle of Fallujah, joint American, Iraqi government, and British offensive in November and December 2004
- Fall of Fallujah, winter 2013–14 offensive of the Islamic State of Iraq and the Levant (ISIL) against the Iraqi government
- Siege of Fallujah (2016), February to May 2016 offensive of the Iraqi government against ISIL
- Third Battle of Fallujah, offensive by the Iraqi government against ISIL in May and June 2016

== See also ==
- Fallujah during the Iraq War (2003)
- War in Iraq (2013–2017), war between Iraq and ISIL
- Gulf War (1990–91)
