= Falahat =

Falahat الفلاحات
- Village
- Interactive map of Falahat
- Location in Iraq
- Coordinates: 33°20′35″N 43°39′28″E
- Country: Iraq
- Governorate: Al Anbar
- Under ISIL control as of July 2016
- Time zone: UTC+3 (AST)
- In 2016, intense fighting occurred during the Siege of Fallujah and Battle of Fallujah.

Falahat (also: Fallahat, al-Fallahat, Mintaqat al Falahat) is a village in Iraq, which is located in the Al Anbar Governorate west of the city of Fallujah, south of the river Euphrates, and south of the road of highways 10, 11, and 12. The town of Habbaniyah is located in the north west of the village.

In 2016, during the Siege of Fallujah and the following battle, there was intense fighting in the area between the Iraqi army and ISIL militants. On 11 May, coalition warplanes bombed the area resulting in the death of 8 militants. 12 ISIL militants were killed and four vehicles and a mortar detachment destroyed by international coalition aviation in the area on 2 June. As of July 2016 the city is under ISIL control.
