= Third Battle of Fallujah =

Battle between the Iraqi government and the Islamic State

- Part of the War in Iraq (2013–2017), the war on terror, the Anbar campaign (2015–2016), and the aftermath of the Siege of Fallujah (2016)
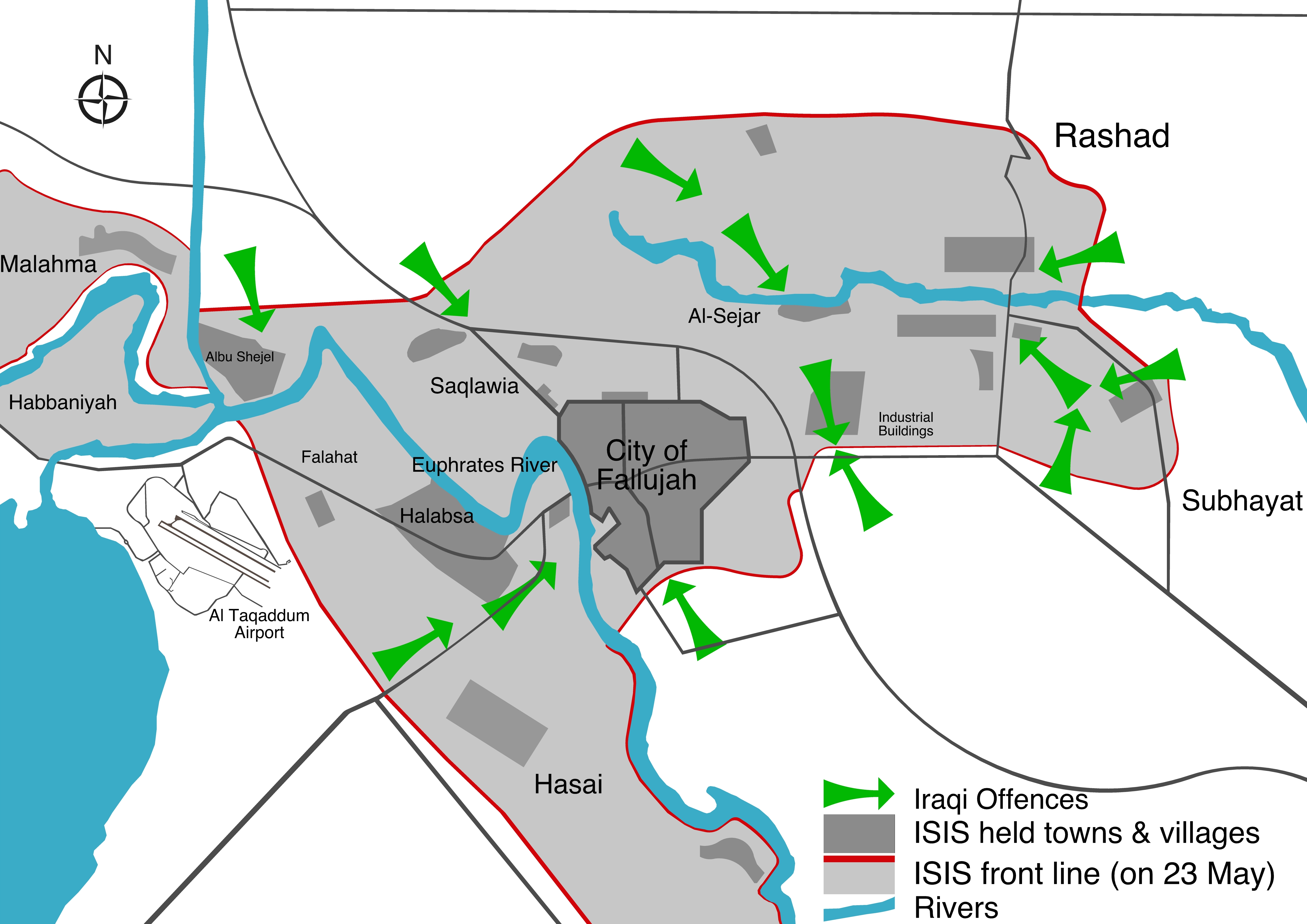
- Fallujah operations on 22–23 May
Date	22 May – 29 June 2016 (1 month and 1 week)
Location	Fallujah and Al-Karmah, Anbar Governorate, Iraq 33.3667°N 43.7667°E
Result	Iraqi government victory
Territorial changes	Iraqi forces recapture the entire city of Fallujah and its suburbs

Belligerents
Iraq; Support: CJTF-OIR (Air support)	ISIL

Commanders and leaders
(Iraq) Haidar al-Abadi (Prime Minister) (Iraq) Khaled al-Obaidi (Defense Minister) (Iraq) Lt. Gen. Abdel-Wahab al-Saadi (Overall commander of the operation) (Iraq) Lt. Gen. Raed Shaker Jawdat (Chief of the Iraqi Federal Police) (Iraq) Maj. Gen. Fadhil Barwari (ICTS commander) (Iraq) Staff Maj. Gen. Ismail al-Mahalawi (Iraq) Lt. Col. Hashim Ismail † (1st Division's Commando Regiments commander) (Iraq) Esa al-Esawi (Mayor of Fallujah)	Maher al-Bilawi † (Fallujah top commander); Ahmed Majeed † (Fallujah security chief); Abu Ubaydah al-Ansari †

Units involved
Iraq Armed Forces; Army; Counter-Terrorism Service (CTS); Air Force; Army Air Corps; Federal Police; Popular Mobilization Forces; Saraya Ansar al-Aqeeda	Military of ISIL: Al-Hisbah (Religious Police)

Strength
11,000–14,500 fighters: 7,000–10,500 Iraqi soldiers; 4,000 PMF militiamen	3,500–4,000 militants

Casualties and losses
394–900+ killed, 3,308 wounded	2,500+ killed, 2,186 captured
- 112 civilians killed 85,000+ civilians displaced

The Third Battle of Fallujah, code-named Operation Breaking Terrorism (Arabic: عملية كسر الإرهاب) by the Iraqi government, was a military operation against ISIL launched to capture the city of Fallujah and its suburbs, located about 69 kilometres (43 mi) west of Baghdad, the capital of Iraq. The operation began on 22 May 2016, three months after the Iraqi forces had started the total siege of Fallujah. On 26 June, Iraqi forces recaptured the city of Fallujah, before recapturing the remaining pocket of ISIL resistance in Fallujah's western outskirts two days later.

== Background ==
Fallujah was the first city seized by ISIL in Iraq in January 2014. Iraqi forces completely surrounded the western city after they recaptured Ramadi in February 2016.

Fallujah was considered to be the second most important stronghold of ISIL in Iraq, after Mosul.

== Preparations ==
The Iraqi Army published a statement on 22 May 2016, and asked residents of the battlefield to leave the area through secured routes. The Iraqi Army also said that local residents who could not move should raise white flags on top of their roofs.

Prior to the Battle of Fallujah, some Shia militias framed the impending campaign using extreme rhetoric, referring to the city as a "tumor" to be eradicated, as "Fallujah the whore," and as a "nest of traitors and criminals." The fight to retake Fallujah was often portrayed sectarian terms: for instance, one Shia militia launched rockets at the city painted with the word "Nimr" – referring to Nimr al-Nimr, the Shia cleric executed by Saudi Arabia earlier that year.

== Offensive ==
=== Capturing the outskirts ===
Haider al-Abadi ordered to begin the operation early on Monday, 23 May. "The Iraqi flag will be raised high over the land of Fallujah," said al-Abadi. On 23 May 2016, it was reported the city of Al-Karmah was recaptured by Shiite militias belonging to the Popular Mobilization Forces (PMF). Photos published by a PMF source show Iran's Quds Force commander Qasem Soleimani and other PMF commanders discussing Fallujah battle strategies. On the first day of the offensive 11 further villages and districts near Fallujah were recaptured, which forced ISIL fighters to retreat to the interior of the strategically important city. The offensive was slowed down due to the discovery of hundreds of improvised explosive devices in the outskirts of the city.

The Popular Mobilization Forces declared on 23 May that they had captured Al-Karmah, about 16 kilometres (9.9 mi)northeast of Fallujah, which brings most of the territory east of Fallujah under Iraqi government control. They also announced the seizure of al-Harariyat, al-Shahabi and al-Dwaya and the killing of 40 ISIL militants during the military operation. The Iraqi government announced that pro-government fighters had captured the villages of Luhaib and Albu Khanfar on 24 May.

On 23 May, 16 villages and districts on the eastern outskirts of Fallujah had been cleared by the Iraqi Security Forces. Included in this were the gains from a column in the northeast, which took the village of Sejar days after the recapture of Al-Karmah. These clashes resulted in the death of 40 ISIL militants. By 25 May, a total of 163 ISIL militants, 15 civilians and 35 members of the Iraqi forces and militiamen were killed in clashes which gained the Iraqi army control over the remaining districts in the southeast, allowing them to create a corridor that cut the ISIL-controlled zone in two. During the day, it was reported an Iranian Basij member was killed in fighting near Fallujah. According to Qasm Araji, a member of the defense committee, the advancing forces are continuously gaining ground and "nearing Fallujah's Eastern gate."

On 27 May, the US-led Coalition conducted airstrikes in and around the city. US-led Coalition air and artillery strikes in and around Fallujah killed 70 ISIL fighters in Fallujah, including the militants’ top commander in the area, Maher Al-Bilawi. On 28 May, the Iraqi Army declared the start of an operation to take Fallujah's city center. Iraq's Counter-Terrorism Service (CTS) was the first unit to break into the city.

On 29 May, the Iraqi forces reportedly repelled an ISIL attack on Albu Shajal, killing "dozens" of militants. On the same day, Iraqi troops seized a key bridge between Zaghareed and Saqlawiyah, in order to facilitate the entry of the security forces from the international highway road into the center of Saqlawiyah.

=== Battle for Fallujah city ===
Early on 30 May, the Iraqi forces began entering the city of Fallujah from three directions and captured the village of Saqlawiyah. However, the Iraqi forces faced very stiff resistance from the ISIL forces inside of the city, slowing their advance. By 31 May, only 3,000 civilians had managed to escape Fallujah. The Iraqi forces entered Fallujah city through the southern village of Nuamiyah, entering the Shuhadaa neighborhood, on the way to the city center. Iraqi forces repelled a four-hour attack by the Islamic State in the south of the city of Fallujah on Tuesday. The militants deployed snipers and six cars carrying explosives which were destroyed before reaching the troops.

The Iraqi Army's advance into Fallujah stalled on Wednesday, 1 June, due to fierce resistance from ISIL fighters and concerns over protecting tens of thousands of civilians still trapped inside the strategic city, officials said. Civilians, including families, were moved to the city center and used as human shields by ISIL. With the operation in its second week, convoys of special forces could only inch forward on the dusty southern outskirts of the city as a handful of airstrikes sent up plumes of white smoke above clusters of low buildings on the fringes of the city's dense urban terrain.

The Fars News Agency reported that, due to the offensive, ISIL commanders had moved cash and jewelry worth US$8 million from Fallujah to the more secure region of Mosul.

On 2 June, the commander of Fallujah operations, Lieutenant General Abdel Wahab al-Saadi, reported further advances of Iraqi forces and the killing of 50 ISIL members in the areas of al-Shuhadaa and al-Nuaimiya in southern Fallujah. In addition, 12 ISIL militants were killed and four vehicles and a mortar detachment destroyed by international coalition aviation in the area of Falahat west of Fallujah.

On 3 June, Iraqi forces moved into a southern neighbourhood of Fallujah. "The security forces have advanced from Naimiya neighbourhood to Shuhada," Lieutenant General Abdel Wahab al-Saadi, the operation's overall commander, told AFP. On the same day, Shi'ite militias uncovered a 6-kilometer-long (4 mi) tunnel in Saqlawiyah, linking the town to Fallujah, which had been used by ISIL militants to stall the offensive and evade airstrikes. On 4 June, Iraqi forces captured the town of Saqlawiyah and stormed a neighborhood in southern Fallujah. A Coalition airstrike killed all the ISIL militants trying to escape from Saqlawiyah on a raft. According to reports, 70 ISIL terrorists were killed during the capture of Saqlawiyah, including several foreign combatants. By 5 June, Iraqi forces had secured the southern edge of Fallujah, capturing the Naymiah neighborhood. A leader of the Popular Mobilization Units said that part of the western bank was the only area of Fallujah's outskirts that hadn't been secured by pro-government forces. Iraqi forces captured the neighbourhood of Al-Shuhada Al-Thaniya on 8 June. Five members of the Iraqi security services were injured during the fighting on that day. The move to capture the outlying area went quickly and forced Islamic State fighters to retreat into the heart of the city, the spokesman, Sabah al-Noman, told state television. Government forces were regrouping before beginning their next advance, he added.

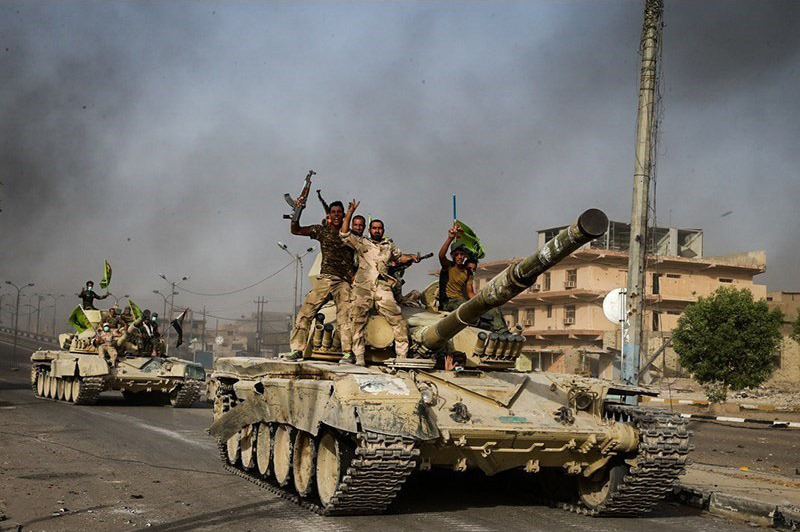
Iraqi T-72 in Fallujah

On 10 June, Iraq's elite counter-terrorism service reportedly moved within three kilometers of central Fallujah, and consolidated positions in the south of the city.

ISIL attacked a military barracks to the east of Fallujah on 11 June. Fifty members of the Iraqi military and allied Shiite paramilitaries and 12 members of ISIL were killed in the attack. Meanwhile, government forces reached Street 40, two miles from Fallujah's city center.

On 12 June, the Iraqi Army said that it had secured the first safe exit route for civilians to leave the Islamic State's besieged stronghold of Fallujah, and the aid group Norwegian Refugee Council said thousands of people had already used it to flee on the first day it was open. The new exit route, known as al-Salam (Peace) Junction, was secured on Saturday, southwest of Fallujah, Joint Operation Command spokesman Brigadier Gen. Yahya Rasool told Reuters. "There were exit routes previously, but this is the first to be completely secured and it's relatively safe," said Rasool. About 4,000 people had fled the city over the past 24 hours through the al-Salam Junction, said Karl Schembri, a spokesman in Iraq for the Norwegian Refugee Council, which has been assisting people who escape the city.

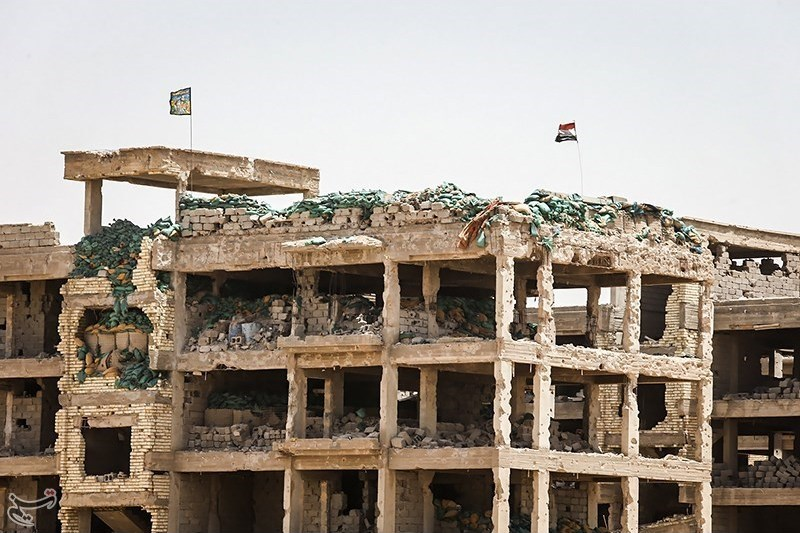
Iraqi flag over the building

On 13 June, 546 militants who were fleeing the city disguised as civilians were arrested by the Iraqi military.

Iraq's police chief said on 14 June that the forces cleared the Fallujah Barrage of ISIL forces and hoisted the Iraqi flag on the crest of the dam. Brigadier Shakir Jawdat said Iraqi forces are now in full control of the barrage, which is located south of Fallujah on the Euphrates River. The Iraqi forces also seized control over three villages of Za’anatha, Ziban, and Atr east of Fallujah. They also recaptured Abbas Jamil Bridge to facilitate the advance on the eastern neighborhoods of the city.

On 16 June, the Federal Police announced it had retaken 25% of the city, capturing al-Khadra, al-Resala, Jubail, Fallujah Barrage, Nazim, al-Shuhada, the sewage station and a gas factory during the current phase to retake the city, during which 232 more ISIL militants were killed. On the same day, Lt. Gen. Raed Shaker Jawdat of Iraqi Federal Police said that ISIL militants had begun a "mass escape" from the city to areas of Halabisa and Albu Alwan west of Fallujah. He saw a "total collapse" among the ranks of ISIL. On the same day, Iraqi army started advancing from Fallahat vicinity to those areas in the western axis of Fallujah, killing 20 ISIL members and opening three routes for the passage of tanks and armored vehicles. At the same time, 900 families were evacuated.

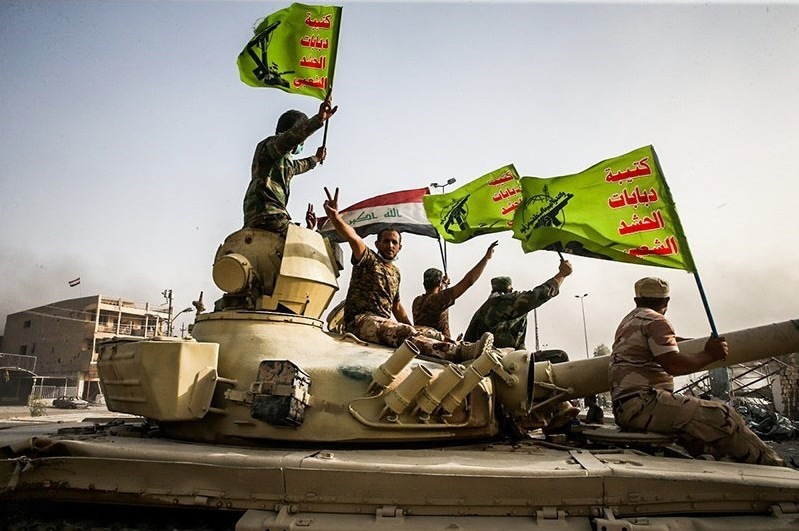
Raising flags after defeating ISIS

The government headquarters of Fallujah was captured by Iraqi forces on 17 June, after they retook several of the city's neighbourhoods in quick succession. During the battle, they faced little resistance from ISIL militants. The operation's commander Lieutenant General Abdul Wahab al-Saadi claimed that Iraqi forces were in control of 70% of the city. In the evening of 17 June, the Iraqi army reported on state television that Fallujah had been fully liberated, though the commander of special forces reported that 80 percent of the city had been recaptured, with ISIL fighters concentrated in four northern districts. Fighting was also still going on at nearby central hospital. On Iraqi state television, Prime Minister Haider al-Abadi congratulated the troops on their victories. The central hospital was recaptured by Iraqi forces on 18 June. The following day, the UN stated that about 80,000 civilians had managed to flee the city in the previous four weeks, many after ISIL reversed its policy of preventing civilians from escaping in mid-June. From 18 to 19 June, it was also reported that the remaining ISIL forces in Fallujah were beginning to collapse. On 19 June, it was reported that 50 ISIL militants had been killed in coalition air strikes and 15 others had been killed in clashes with Iraqi security forces. Also, more than 300 soldiers had died over the previous two days.

Later on 21 June, a US commander claimed that Iraqi forces had only cleared 30% of Fallujah of ISIL militants, with fighting still going on in other areas. Iraqi forces captured the police district of Shurta and the military district of Askari by 21 June. The capture of the districts left only the neighborhoods of Golan and Jughaifi as well as the outlying part of Fallujah on the western bank of the Euphrates river under ISIL control. Brig. Gen. Haider al-Obeidi told the Associated Press that 2,500 militants had been killed during the operation and the districts of Shurta and Jughaifi were captured by Iraqi forces by 22 June.

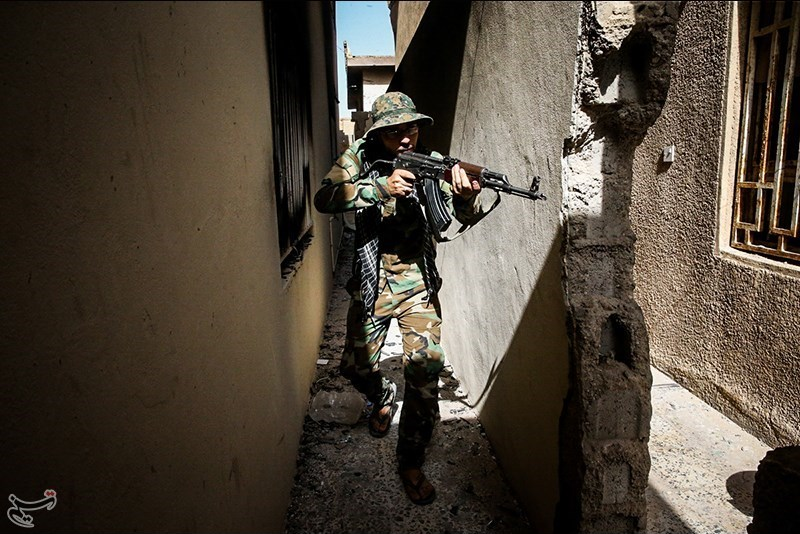
Iraqi soldier searching builds for remaining ISIS militants

On 23 June, al-Obeidi claimed that Iraqi forces were in control of 90% of the city. Clashes were still ongoing with ISIL as Iraqi forces made no significant advancement during the day. ISIL was in control of only the Golan neighborhood and a few scattered pockets. The last of the ISIL fighters were reported to be in Jolan and Al-Mualemin neighborhoods. The neighborhood of Al-Mualemin was fully captured and cleared of ISIL militants on 25 June. Iraqi forces also raised the Iraqi flag on a medical centre they captured in the Jolan neighborhood.

On 26 June, Iraqi forces recaptured the rest of Fallujah, with an Iraqi commander stating that the entire city was under Iraqi control and declared the operation was over.

A Joint Operations Command spokesperson confirmed the full capture of the city and added that fighting was ongoing against pockets of ISIL resistance northwest of Fallujah. Iraqi Prime Minister Haider al-Abadi visited Fallujah after its recapture. In a televised address, Abadi appeared outside Fallujah's main hospital waving an Iraqi flag and urged Iraqis to celebrate the day of Fallujah's recapture from ISIL.

On Monday, 27 June, the Iraqi Army advanced into Fallujah's western outskirts, to eliminate Islamic State militants holed up in the farmland west of Fallujah, to keep them from launching counterattacks on the city a day after Baghdad declared victory over ISIL there. Backed by airstrikes from the U.S.-led Coalition, Iraqi artillery bombarded targets, as troops closed in on up to 150 militants in areas along the southern bank of the Euphrates River Colonel Ahmed al-Saidi, who participated in Monday's advance, said ground forces were moving cautiously to avoid triggering roadside bombs planted by ISIL. "They (holed-up militants) have two options: either they surrender or they get killed. We want to prevent them catching their breath and attacking our forces with car bombs." Early on 28 June, the Iraqi Government reported that 80% of areas of al-Halabisa, Albu Alwan and Albu Herat had been recaptured. Later on the same day, the Iraqi Army captured the Halabisa and Albu Alwan areas, fully recapturing Fallujah's western suburbs.

On 29 June, Iraqi jets targeted a convoy of militants and their supporters fleeing from Fallujah's villages under cover of a dust storm. The Iraqi Air Force claimed that about 426 vehicles carrying up to 2,000 militants were hit in the airstrikes.

Later that day, the U.S.-led coalition conducted airstrikes against retreating ISIL convoys on the outskirts of Fallujah, killing at least 250 militants and destroying 40 vehicles. Overall, 348 militants were killed and more than 200 vehicles were destroyed throughout the day. This large-scale air attack diverted US fighter jets from a concurrent offensive on Abu Kamal, launched by US-backed Syrian rebel forces in Syria, causing the Syrian rebel forces to lose to ISIL.

== War Crimes ==
The Battle of Fallujah (2016), part of the larger campaign against the Islamic State of Iraq and the Levant (ISIL), was marked by allegations of war crimes committed by both ISIL and Iraqi state forces, including allied militias. These violations, which included extrajudicial killings, torture, and the use of human shields, caused significant civilian suffering and raised concerns about adherence to international humanitarian law.

=== Iraqi State Forces ===
Iraqi forces were accused of carrying out summary executions and torturing detainees suspected of being ISIL affiliates. Reports documented instances where Sunni civilians, fleeing ISIL-held areas, were subjected to beatings, mistreatment, and, in some cases, execution without trial. Human rights organizations reported that these actions disproportionately targeted Sunni individuals, further exacerbating sectarian tensions. Sunni men and boys were reportedly detained en masse during the operation, with hundreds disappearing after being taken into custody by Iraqi forces and allied militias. Families often received no information about the whereabouts or fate of their detained relatives. Iraqi state forces were accused of conducting airstrikes and artillery shelling in civilian areas of Fallujah, resulting in non-combatant casualties. These actions violated the principles of proportionality and distinction, key tenets of international humanitarian law. Following the liberation of certain areas, some Iraqi forces and militias were alleged to have looted homes, businesses, and public facilities. Reports also indicated deliberate destruction of Sunni mosques and private property, further heightening sectarian animosity.

=== ISIL Forces ===
ISIL used civilians as human shields to deter airstrikes and ground assaults. Civilians were confined in buildings near ISIL positions or forcibly moved to frontline areas, endangering their lives during the fighting. ISIL carried out mass executions of civilians accused of collaborating with Iraqi forces or attempting to flee the city. Public executions, including beheadings and other forms of torture, were documented as part of ISIL's efforts to maintain control through fear. ISIL forcibly recruited children to serve as fighters, suicide bombers, and scouts. The use of child soldiers constitutes a war crime under international law. ISIL deployed improvised explosive devices (IEDs), mortar fire, and snipers in civilian areas, causing casualties among residents and displaced persons. These attacks targeted civilians indiscriminately, further exacerbating the humanitarian crisis.

== Impact on Civilians ==
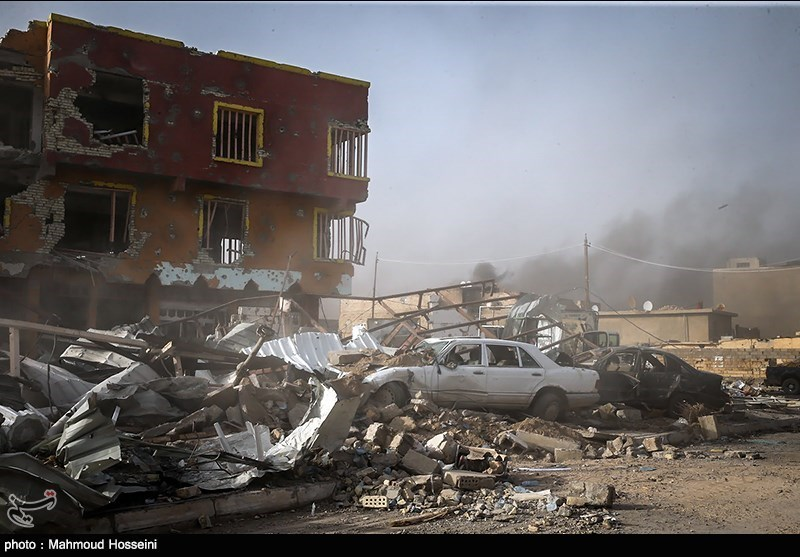
Destroyed buildings in Fallujah after the battle

The battle resulted in significant civilian displacement, with tens of thousands forced to flee Fallujah. Civilians trapped in the city faced starvation and a lack of access to medical care due to ISIL-imposed blockades and the ongoing conflict. Reports highlighted instances where fleeing civilians were caught in crossfire or targeted by both sides during the fighting.

== Aftermath ==
The Federal Police Command announced dismantling a large laboratory for booby-trapped vehicles and manufacturing of explosives in central Fallujah. The laboratory contained tons of explosives, it added.

The Federal Police Chief Lieutenant General Raed Shaker Jawdat said, "Today the security forces discovered a large laboratory for booby-trapped vehicles and explosives' manufacturing at Nezal in central Fallujah during the search operations carried out in the liberated areas. The booby-trapping laboratory that was found in Nezal was completely dismantled, while tons of explosives and detonators were found inside it."

Anbar Provincial Council informed that the security forces secured the old road that links Ramadi with Fallujah and this will be used for the movement of military convoys only. Member of the security committee in Anbar Provincial Council Rajee Barakat al-Eissawi, in said, "The security forces secured the old road linking Ramadi and Fallujah. The road was secured after liberating some areas in Khalidiya from ISIS control."

Eissawi added, "The security forces managed to liberate the international highway three days ago and managed to open the old road that extends to 44 km towards the new bridge of Fallujah."

== See also ==
- Fall of Fallujah (2014)
- Fallujah during the Iraq War
- Mosul offensive (2016)
- 2016 Abu Kamal offensive
- Northern Raqqa offensive (May 2016), a simultaneous offensive against ISIL-held Raqqa, Syria
- Manbij offensive (2016)
- Pledging Conference in Support of Iraq
- Timeline of ISIL-related events (2016)
- Highway of Death
