= Al Azrakiyah =

- Village
- Location within Iraq
- Country: Iraq
- Governorate: Al Anbar

Al Azrakiyah (also: Mintaqat Al Azrakiyah) is a village in Iraq, which is located in the Al Anbar Governorate west of the city of Fallujah, on the river Euphrates. On the southern banks of river Euphrathes lies Halabisah.

In 2016, during the Anbar offensive and the Third Battle of Fallujah, there was intense fighting in the area between the Iraqi army and ISIL militants. On 4 June, 20 Iraqi soldiers and Sunni tribal fighters died in an ISIL car bombing on Azrakiyah main road, as the Iraqi army was closing in on Fallujah after the capture of nearby Saqlawiyah.
