= Abdullah al-Janabi =

Chief of the Mujahideen Shura Council in Iraq

- عبد الله الجنابي
- Born: c. 1951; Fallujah, Iraq
- Title: former Sunni chief of the Mujahideen Shura Council in Fallujah, Iraq
- Criminal charge: the Central Criminal Court issued an arrest warrant for him in 2005

Abdullah al-Janabi (Arabic: عبد الله الجنابي; born c. 1951) is the former Sunni chief of the Mujahideen Shura Council in Fallujah, Iraq. He gained power following his involvement in the insurgency at the First Battle of Fallujah in which the insurgents captured Fallujah.

He was present at the eventual loss of the city at the Second Battle of Fallujah, but he managed to evade capture by American forces and fled the city.

On 9 January 2005, the Central Criminal Court issued an arrest warrant for him.

After the Fall of Fallujah to the Islamic State of Iraq and the Levant and other anti-government Sunni forces in January 2014, Janabi returned to Fallujah, and began making weekly sermons at the Saad bin Abi Waqas mosque in northern Fallujah. At the mosque Janabi told worshippers that "Blood is on the hands of all policemen. Police buildings were used to torture and to extract confessions ... and must be cleansed." Referring to the Iraqi Army, he also claimed that "We swear by God almighty and the blood of martyrs that the Safavid army will not enter the city of Fallujah except over our dead bodies." He also distributed leaflets announcing a new "Committee for the Promotion of Virtue and Prevention of Vice" to enforce its strict Islamic code.

During his sermons, about 200 masked ISIL militants using looted police vehicles guarded the road leading to the mosque, where worshippers were checked for weapons.

As of 2015, he was a preacher and a "Sharia Council" member for the Islamic State.
