= Albu Huwa =

Coordinates: 33.257°N 43.836°E

Albu Huwa (also: Albu Hawa, Qaryat Albu Hawa) is a village in Iraq, which is located in the Al Anbar Governorate south of the city of Fallujah and north of Amiriyah Fallujah, in a loop of the river Euphrates.

In 2016, during the Siege of Fallujah, there was intense fighting in the area between the Iraqi army and ISIL militants. There were reports that 2,000 families were trapped in two villages, Albu Huwa and Hasai, and used as human shields.
