= Fallujah (disambiguation) =

Fallujah is a city in Iraq. It may also refer to:

- Fallujah District, a district of Iraq.
- Fallujah (band), an American death metal band.
- Fallujah Barrage, a barrage in Iraq.
