= Halabisah =

Village in Anbar province, Iraq

Coordinates: 33.3374°N 43.7100°E

Halabisah (also: Halabisa, Al-Halabsa, Halabsah, Al-Halabesa, Qaryat al Halabisah, Qaryat al Ḩalābisah) is a village in Iraq, which is located in the Al Anbar Governorate west of the city of Fallujah and south of the river Euphrates. The road of highways 10, 11, and 12 passes through the village.

In 2016, during the Siege of Fallujah, there was intense fighting in the area between the Iraqi army and ISIL militants. On 11 May, coalition warplanes bombed the area resulting in the death of 8 ISIL militants. During the Third Battle of Fallujah, on 16 June, many ISIL militants fled to Halabisah area, where they were attacked by Iraqi army.
