= Hasi =

Hasi may refer to:

- Has (region), a region in Albania and Kosovo
- Hasai, a village in Iraq
- Hasi Goat, an Albanian goat breed
- Besnik Hasi (born 1971), an Albanian coach

== See also ==
- Asi (disambiguation)
- HASI (disambiguation)
- Hasie
- Hassi
- Hazi
