= Anbar campaign (2013–2014) =

2014 campaign in Anbar province, Iraq

- Part of the War in Iraq (2013–2017)
- Map showing the 2014 situation in Anbar. For a war map of the current situation of Iraq, see here.
Date	30 December 2013 – 25 June 2014 (5 months, 3 weeks and 5 days)
Location	Anbar Governorate, Iraq
Result	ISIL victory
Territorial changes	By late June 2014, at least 70% of the Anbar Province was under ISIL control, including the cities of Fallujah, Al-Qa'im, Ar Rutbah, Abu Ghraib and half of Ramadi.

Belligerents
Islamic State of Iraq and the Levant Military Council of Anbar's Revolutionaries: Naqshbandi Army; General Military Council for Iraqi Revolutionaries; Anbar Tribal Council	Iraq: Iraqi military; ISOF; Iraqi Police; Shia Muslim Militias; Awakening Councils; Pro-government tribes; Ba'athist Syria; Supported by: Iran; United States

Commanders and leaders
Abu Bakr al-Baghdadi; Abu Muslim al-Turkmani; Abu Ibrahim al-Hashimi al-Qurashi; Abu Abdulrahman al-Bilawi; Abu Waheeb; Abdullah al-Janabi Izzat Ibrahim ad-Douri; Ali Hatem al-Suleiman Al-Dulaimi	(Iraq) Nouri al-Maliki (Iraq) Saadoun al-Dulaimi (Iraq) Ali Ghaidan Majid (Iraq) Babaker Shawkat B. Zebari (Iraq) Ahmed Abu Risha (Iraq) Governor Ahmed Khalaf Dheyabi (Iraq) Saeed Fleih al-Osman † (Iraq) Maj. Gen. Fadhil Barwari (ISOF commander)

Units involved
Unknown	1st Division; 2nd Division; 7th Division; ISOF

Casualties and losses
300 killed 528 captured	6,000 killed 12,000 deserted
- 1,168 civilians killed, 480,000 IDPs (UNHCR estimate)

Beginning in December 2012, Sunnis in Iraq protested against the Maliki government. On 28 December 2013, a Sunni MP named Ahmed al-Alwani was arrested in a raid on his home in Ramadi. Alwani was a prominent supporter of the anti-government protests. This incident led to violence in Al Anbar Governorate between the Iraqi Army and a loose alliance of tribal militias and other groups fighting alongside the Islamic State of Iraq and the Levant (ISIL).

In January 2014, the anti-government forces took control of Fallujah, and there was heavy fighting in Ramadi. In March, the Iraqi army secured Ramadi and attempted to regain Fallujah. In June, ISIL launched a major offensive in Anbar in conjunction with their assault on northern Iraq. By 23 June, they controlled at least 70% of Anbar.

== Background ==
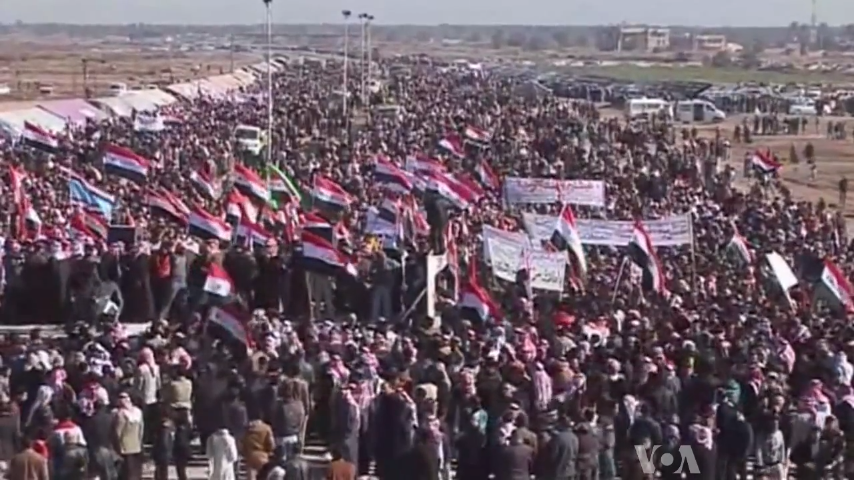
Demonstrators protesting against Maliki in Ramadi in the Square of Pride and Dignity (Al-Bu Farraj)

Prior to the campaign, Sunnis in Al Anbar Governorate, including members of the Dulaim tribe, held anti-government rallies and demonstrations from December 2012 to December 2013. The protests began on 21 December 2012 following a raid on the home of Sunni Finance Minister Rafi al-Issawi and the arrest of 10 of his bodyguards. The protests were driven by Sunnis who felt marginalized in post-Saddam Iraq, and who claimed that anti-terrorism laws were being abused and used to arrest and harass Sunnis. The growth of the protests, however, led the initial demands to be expanded, and eventually one of the main requests of the protesters was the resignation of Prime Minister Maliki. Other issues often cited were the abuse of De-Baathification laws and unfair confiscation of property of former Baathists, and Iranian interference in Iraqi affairs.

=== Groups involved ===
The tribes of Dulaim, Zoba, Al-Jumeilat, and Al-Bu Issa tribal fighters were the main component in fighting the Iraqi army.

There were several groups comprising the non-ISIL armed opposition. Army of the Men of the Naqshbandi Order (JRTN) were also said to be part of the Sunni opposition to the Iraqi government. The Military Council of the Tribal Revolutionaries (MCIR), the largest of the non-ISIL groups, appeared to include a number of groups previously involved in the Iraqi Insurgency including the JRTN, 1920 Revolution Brigades, the Islamic Army in Iraq, the Jaish al-Rashideen, Iraqi Hamas, and the former Mujahideen Shura Council of Abdullah al-Janabi.

A second group, known as the Anbar Tribes Revolutionary Council was headed by Sheikh Ali Hatim al-Suleiman. This group, unlike the MCTR, did not actively advocate the overthrow of the Iraqi government, but instead was limited in ambition to defending Anbar from what it saw as aggression from the Iraqi central government.

The final group is known as the Army of Pride and Dignity, although the group is distinct from the group of the same name formed by Sheikh Ali Hatem Suleiman following the 2013 Hawija clashes.

== 2013 ==
=== December ===
Clashes in western Iraq began on 30 December 2013 when Iraqi security forces arrested Sunni MP Ahmed al-Alwani and clashed with some of his relatives from the Albo-alon clan of the Dulaim tribe, the largest tribe in Anbar. on the second day Iraqi security forces tore down a year-old Sunni protest camp in Ramadi. Tribal militias battled against the Iraqi Army in Ramadi and Fallujah. After the Iraqi Army withdrew from Anbar province to cool the situation on 31 December, tribal militants took over Fallujah and Karma and most of the city of Ramadi. Shortly after, militants from the Islamic State of Iraq and the Levant (ISIL) entered some of the neighborhoods of Ramadi and other parts of Anbar. Following the arrival of ISIL, some tribal militias allied themselves with ISIL forces.

On 30 December 2013, Iraqi Prime Minister Nuri al-Maliki said that Iraqi Army soldiers would depart to restive cities in Al Anbar Province, but reversed that decision the following day.

== 2014 ==
=== January–February – Fall of Fallujah and the Battle of Ramadi ===
Army forces, as of 2 January, remained outside Ramadi. On 3 January, al-Qaeda-linked militants took over several police stations in Fallujah. In the early morning, tribal and ISIL fighters advanced into areas in central Ramadi and deployed snipers on one street, a police captain said. A police colonel said the army had re-entered into areas of Fallujah, between Ramadi and Baghdad, but that around a quarter of it remained under ISIL and tribal control. However, another senior officer, a police lieutenant colonel, said that while soldiers had been deployed around the city, they had yet to enter Fallujah. More than 100 people were killed during the day as Iraqi police and tribesmen battled militants.

On 4 January, the Iraqi government lost control of Fallujah to ISIL. The Iraqi Army also shelled Fallujah with mortars to try to wrest back control from the militants and tribesmen, killing at least eight people, according to unnamed tribal leaders and officials. Unnamed medical sources in Fallujah said another 30 people were wounded in the shelling.

On 3 January ISIL began distributing leaflets announcing a new "Committee for the Promotion of Virtue and Prevention of Vice" whose purpose was to enforce the group's strict Islamic code, similar to how the city was governed from 2005 to 2006 under the Mujahideen Shura Council. Two days after the fall of Fallujah Abdullah al-Janabi, the former Chief of the Mujahideen Shura Council, returned to the city, making an appearance on 4 January at the Saad bin Abi Waqas mosque in northern part of the city. At the mosque Janabi told worshippers that "Blood is on the hands of all policemen. Police buildings were used to torture and to extract confessions ... and must be cleansed." Referring to the Iraqi Army, he also claimed that "We swear by God almighty and the blood of martyrs that the Safavid army will not enter the city except over our dead bodies." During the appearance about 200 masked militants using looted police vehicles guarded the road leading to the mosque, where worshippers were checked for weapons before Janabi's sermon at weekly prayers.

On 6 January, Iraqi security forces, backed by tribal fighters, regained control of the centre of Ramadi. However, clashes continued in the surrounding areas the next day, while in the city centre, government offices, hospitals and markets reopened. On 7 January, Iraqi missile strikes on Ramadi killed 25 militants. On the same day, unidentified gunmen also killed seven police officers, including a captain, in an attack at a security checkpoint on a highway north of the city of Samarra. Though no group claimed responsibility for the attack, police officials suspected the ISIL militants. As of 8 January, in addition to Fallujah, ISIL had control of the Anbar cities of Al-Karmah, Hīt, Khaldiyah, Haditha, Al Qaim and parts of Ramadi and Abu Ghraib, along with numerous smaller settlements in Anbar.

On 8 January, an unnamed Iraq police captain confirmed that an overnight offensive by security forces and tribal fighters aimed at dislodging ISIL from south Ramadi was repulsed by the insurgents after seven hours of heavy fighting. On 9 January, Iraqi security forces, backed by tanks, engaged in heavy fighting with ISIL militants in the Albubali area, between Ramadi and Fallujah. On 10 January, clashes erupted between Iraqi special forces and ISIL in al-Bubali village between Fallujah and Ramadi. On the same day, tribesmen and police retook two areas of Ramadi. On 14 January, Sunni fighters, including ISIL, overran several more areas of Ramadi. On 16 January, the Iraqi army, backed by Sunni tribesmen, managed to retake the city of Saqlawiyah in a counterattack against ISIL.

On 17 January, the ISIL militants in Fallujah called on people to join them in their fight against the government, but earlier in the day, Iraqi media reported that security forces had retaken several key areas of Ramadi. On 19 January, the Iraqi army launched an operation in Ramadi. The advance was halted after eight police and tribal militia members were killed in clashes. The next day, an unnamed Iraqi official suggested that the ISIL had sufficient heavy weaponscapability to threaten Baghdad. On 21 January, the Iraqi army, backed by Sunni tribesmen, continued to attack key neighbourhoods of Ramadi in attempt to retake control from ISIL. The next day, the defence ministry claimed that at least 50 militants were killed in air strikes against militant targets in Anbar.

On 26 January, according to witnesses, ISIL militants were reported to have captured five Iraqi soldiers near Fallujah. ISIL also seized six army Humvees and set fire to some of them after clashes with security forces near Fallujah. It was further reported that at least seven people were killed by Iraqi army airstrikes and artillery fire. On 30 January, Iraqi Defense Ministry spokesman Mohammad al-Askari said that security forces and their allied tribal fighters regained control of Albu Farraj, north of Ramadi, as well as Al-Nasaf, on the western outskirts of Fallujah; he called these areas an "important base" for ISIL. On 31 January, according to a statement by the Ministry of Defence, the 39th Brigade of the Iraqi army, reinforced by the Iraqi Air Force with support from tribal fighters, killed 40 militants and captured ISIL's headquarters in Fallujah.

On 1 February, the Iraqi army and police, with the support of pro-government militias, launched another offensive against ISIL in Ramadi and Fallujah. At least 35 militants were killed and large amounts of weaponry were seized in the clashes in the militant-held neighborhoods of Malaab, Dhubat, and Street 60 in Ramadi. On 3 February, the Ministry of Defence reported that the Iraqi army and its allied tribesmen killed 57 ISIL militants in advance of a possible assault on Fallujah, which was held by the rebels. On 8 February, Anbar Governor Ahmed Khalaf Dheyabi sent an ultimatum to ISIL calling on them to surrender within a week.

On 9 February, 13 ISIL members were killed in Ramadi's Malab area. On 12 February, a senior ISIL leader, Abo Majid al-Saudi, was killed alongside seven other members of the group in eastern Ramadi. On 15 February, the Iraqi Joint Command announced that during a raid in the al-Milahma, Albu Shihab and Khalidiya areas several ISIL members were killed. On 18 February, 45 ISIL gunmen were killed, including Syrian and Afghan fighters. On 19 February, an ISIL leader, Abd Khaliq Mahedi, turned himself to the Chairman of Sons of Iraq Council, Mohamed al-Hayis, and declared his support to the security forces in combating ISIL. On 28 February, a bomb attack in Haditha killed the pro-government Sunni tribal Sheikh and councilman Fleih al-Osman and six of his fighters, while five civilians were wounded, according to police chief Colonel Farouq al-Jughaifi.

=== March–May – Government counter-attack ===
On 16 March, Iraqi Security Forces recaptured Ramadi and parts of Fallujah.

On 13 April, pro-government tribal fighters took control of the Fallujah Dam.

On 7 May, reports emerged that Iraqi Security forces were planning a major strike to reclaim territories in Fallujah, Garma, Duwylieba and Jurf al-Sakhar. At this time, it was confirmed that ISIL took full control of Fallujah.

On 9 May, the military launched its offensive and by 18 May, security forces regained control of the international expressway east of Fallujah and captured 16 villages and towns around the city.

=== June – ISIL offensive ===
On 3 June, at least 18 people were killed and 43 wounded in shelling of Fallujah.

On 7 June, gunmen linked to ISIL took students at the University of Anbar hostage after killing a number of guards and destroying "a bridge leading to the main gate." The crisis was resolved when students were permitted to leave several hours later, departing the campus in buses provided by the local government. No students were reported to have been injured during the incident.

On 12 June, an Iraqi Border Patrol battalion stationed along the Syrian border abandoned its positions in the face of advancing ISIL forces to break out to the relative safety of the Kurdish-controlled town of Sinjar in Nineveh. However, the convoy of 60 trucks and hundreds of border police were thrown into disarray and panic when a small force of ISIL vehicles attacked them en route. By the time Kurdish forces arrived, the police force had been completely routed and decimated with an unknown number of killed and captured, while others fled into the desert leaving all their vehicles behind. Only two policemen managed to arrive at Sinjar on foot.

On 15 June, ISIL captured Saqlawiyah where army helicopters were hovering over the town to provide cover for retreating troops. During the fighting a helicopter was shot down.

On 17 June, Syrian rebels, made up of the Free Syrian Army and the Al-Qaeda-affiliated Al-Nusra Front, captured the Al-Qaim border crossing between Syria and Iraq.

On 19 June, ISIL captured Hussein's Al Muthanna Chemical Weapons Facility near Lake Tharthar, roughly 45 miles northwest of Baghdad, in an area which had firmly come under rebel control by this point. Later in the evening, fighting broke in Al-Qaim, near the border with Syria, and lasted until around noon the next day with most of the town coming under militant control. 34 members of the Iraqi security forces were killed in the clashes. The insurgent assault on the town started with a major artillery barrage which was followed by a major assault.

Two days later, ISIL captured the Al-Qaim border crossing with Syria after Syrian rebels retreated. The town itself and the surrounding area had also been fully secured by ISIL. 11 soldiers and 20 militants were killed and 20 soldiers were wounded during fighting for Al-Qaim the previous day. ISIL then advanced further in the province and captured the towns of Rawa, Ana and Huseiba. The Iraqi army's regional command headquarters near Rawa and Ana had also become surrounded and much of Ramadi was reported to be militant-controlled. Overall, an entire Iraqi Security Force brigade was reportedly destroyed in the Al-Qaim area in the previous days. Late in the evening, ISIL captured Rutba.

The next morning, ISIL forces captured the Al Jazeera Command Center in the town of Rasa and two new border crossings, one with Syrian and one with Jordan.

On 23 June, government forces recaptured the Al-Waleed border crossing with Syria after militants retreated without resistance. The crossing with Jordan was also recaptured a day later.

On 24 June, Syrian warplanes struck several areas in Western Iraq, killing at least 57 civilians, in what US officials claimed were strikes on ISIL positions. However, there had not been an official statement from the Syrian government.

On 25 June, insurgents advanced towards the Haditha Dam, the second-largest in Iraq, and reached Burwana, on the eastern side of Haditha. Government forces engaged them in an attempt to halt their advance.

== Aftermath – autumn 2014 continued fighting ==
In late September and early October 2014, IS launched an offensive aimed at fully occupying Anbar province. Between 14 and 22 September, IS militants successfully laid siege to Saqlawiyah, resulting in its fall and the deaths of hundreds of soldiers. On 4 October, IS seized the town of Kubaysah following the capture of most of nearby Hit. On 13 October, the Iraqi army fully retreated from Hit. IS fighters looted three armored vehicles and at least five tanks. The fighting over Hit displaced up to 180,000 people, the U.N. estimated. On 23 October, IS militants seized the Iraqi village of Albu Nimr, after overcoming weeks of fierce resistance by its namesake Sunni tribe.

Between 28 and 31 October, the militants from IS killed from 46 to 220 members of the Sunni tribes who opposed IS and which fought on the side of the Iraqi government against IS.

On 2 November, Iraq's government said that IS militants killed 322 members of the Iraqi Sunni tribe and four days later, a leader of the Albu Nimr tribe stated that 540 of its members had been killed by IS. On 10 November, 70 more members of the Albu Nimr tribe were executed by IS near Hit.

Fighting broke out in the provincial capital Ramadi, on 21 November.

On 23 November, an airstrike on the town of Hit killed civilians. A family of four were killed, including two children. It is unclear who carried out the strike.

== Humanitarian consequences ==
There were over 380,000 internally displaced persons by mid-March 2014, 300,000 of whom were displaced mostly during the previous six weeks. According to the UNHCR, most people were displaced "due to insecurity around Fallujah and Ramadi" and had "fled to outlying communities in Anbar province," though "60,000 persons have fled to more distant provinces." There were a total of 336 killed and 1,562 injured, as of the same date.

== Response ==
The U.S. confirmed in January 2014 that to assist with the fight against groups in this area, they were speeding up supply of equipment to Iraq, including Hellfire missiles, ScanEagle UAVs, and Raven UAVs. In June 2014, foreign involvement in Iraq became more direct as both an American-led intervention and a parallel Iranian intervention began.

== See also ==
- Anbar campaign (2015–2016)
- Battle of Ramadi (2014–2015)
