= Hasai =

Hasai (also: Hasi) is a village in Iraq, which is located in the Al Anbar Governorate south of the city of Fallujah and in the north west of Amiriyah Fallujah, about 3km from a loop of the river Euphrates. It is a farmer's village.

During Iraq War in November 2003, a U.S. Chinook helicopter was shot down near Hasai.

In 2016, during the Siege of Fallujah, there was intense fighting in the area between the Iraqi army and ISIL militants. There were reports that 2,000 families were trapped in two villages, Albu Huwa and Hasai, and used as human shields.
