= Battle of Samarra (2004) =

2004 battle

Battle of Samara
- Part of the Iraq War
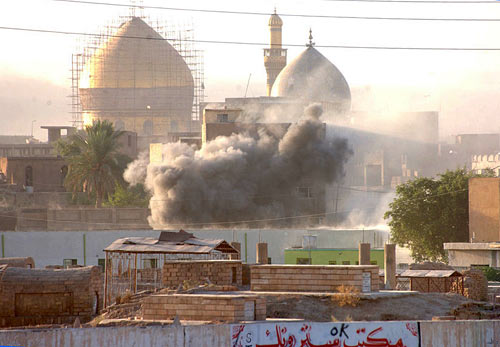
- Smoke rises from near the Golden Mosque during the battle of Samarra, 1 October 2004.
| Date | 1–3 October 2004 |
| Location | Samarra, Iraq |
| Result | Coalition victory |

Belligerents
| Jama'at al-Tawhid wal-Jihad; Islamic Army in Iraq | United States; Iraq |

Commanders and leaders
| Haitham Shaker Badri | (Iraq) Adnan Thabit |

Units involved
| Unknown | (United States) 1st Infantry Division: 2nd Brigade CT; (United States) 25th Infantry Division: 2nd Brigade CT; (Iraq) 7th Iraqi Army Battalion (Iraq) 202nd Iraqi National Guard Battalion (Iraq) Iraqi 36th Commando Battalion |

Strength
| 500–1,000 insurgents | (United States) 3,000 troops (Iraq) 2,000 security forces |

Casualties and losses
| 127 killed 60 wounded 128 captured | (United States) 1 killed (Iraq) 4 killed |
- 20 civilians killed 61 civilians wounded

The Battle of Samarra, also called Operation Baton Rouge, took place in 2004 during the Iraq War. The city of Samarra in central Iraq had fallen under the control of insurgents shortly after insurgents had seized control of Fallujah and Ramadi. In preparation for an offensive to retake Fallujah, on 1 October, 5,000 American and Iraqi troops assaulted Samarra and secured the city after three days of fighting.

== Losing control ==
During the month of September, negotiations with local commanders produced a city council which was to govern the city. However, insurgents soon seized control and the agreement fell apart. The city government was infiltrated by insurgents and the city came under the control of the Iraqi insurgency. Fighters loyal to the insurgents, including but not particularly Abu Musab Zarqawi, roamed the streets, confiscating music cassette tapes, which were condemned as haram. Attacks on American and Iraqi forces in the vicinity of the city greatly increased. American commanders decided to re-take the city as a precursor to the upcoming battle to retake Fallujah.

== Battle ==
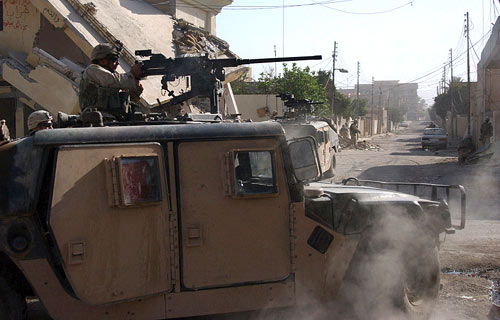
An American soldier in the turret of a Humvee fires a .50-caliber machine gun in Samarra, Iraq, 1 October 2004

On the morning of 1 October, the Iraqi 36th Commando Battalion seized the Golden Mosque inside the city, capturing 25 insurgents and uncovering weapons caches. The Golden Mosque is considered the third-holiest shrine in Shia Islam, and any damage to it would have aroused significant controversy. Other Iraqi troops secured the Great Mosque of Samarra, a valued historic and cultural site.

That same day, American troops with 1-26th INF along with 1–14 INF secured the main bridge across the Tigris River. American forces encountered insurgents transporting and unloading weapons using speedboats and opened fire, destroying the boats.

American and Iraqi forces were supported by M1 Abrams tanks, M2 Bradley armored fighting vehicles, one platoon of cannon artillery (155mm M109A6 Paladin howitzers) from the North Carolina Army National Guard 30th bct A btry 2nd platoon 1-113, 25th ID 2nd BCT, 1-14th INF and the 1st ID 2nd BCT, C Co. 2/108 INF 27th BCT (NYARNG), B Co. 2/108 INF 27th BCT (NYARNG), 1-26th INF Task Force that was responsible for securing Samarra. Additional forces from 1-18th IN TF, 1-77th AR TF, 1–4 Cav, and the 9th Engr Bn supported this operation and smoke support from 12th Chemical Co. They focused on capturing major government and police buildings. After heavy street fighting, American and Iraqi forces controlled about half the city after the first day of fighting. CNN reporter Jane Arraf entered the city with US troops and covered the battle live. Fighting continued for two more days before the entire city was secured.

Around 90 weapons caches were captured during the course of the operation.

== Aftermath ==
After the battle, American forces began a program to provide security, build up the local police forces, and spent tens of millions of dollars on public works projects and hospitals. These initiatives brought some measure of security to the city, however, this did not prevent the bombing of the Golden Mosque in February 2006.
