= Siege of Fallujah (2016) =

Offensive that the Iraqi government launched against ISIL

Coordinates: 33.4167°N 43.3000°E

- Part of the War in Iraq and the Anbar campaign (2015–16)
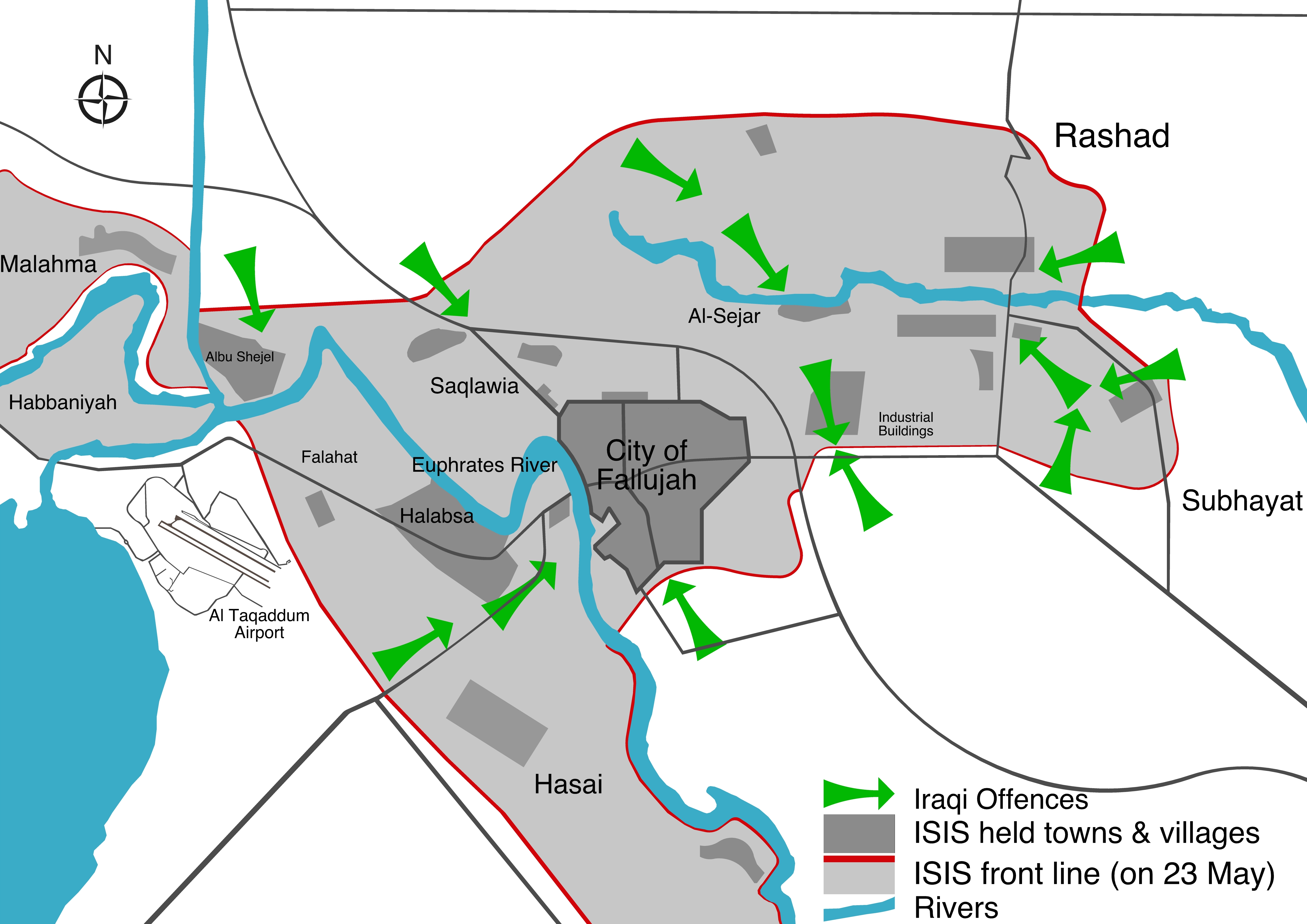
- The beginning of the Operation Breaking Terrorism in the next phase of the struggle for Fallujah.
Date	2 February 2016 – 22 May 2016 (3 months, 2 weeks and 6 days)
Location	Fallujah and Al-Karmah, Anbar Governorate, Iraq
Result	Fallujah is fully besieged by Iraqi government forces; Iraqi forces capture Al-Karmah; On 22 May 2016, the Iraqi Army and its allies launch an offensive to recapture the city; Iraqi Armed forces recapture Fallujah on 26 June 2016

Belligerents
Iraq; Iraqi security forces; Armed Forces; Federal Police; Shi'ite militias; Local Sunni tribes; Iran; Quds Force; Air support: United States; United Kingdom; France; Australia	Islamic State of Iraq and the Levant

Commanders and leaders
Haider al-Abadi (Prime Minister of Iraq); Maj. Gen. Fadhil Barwari (ICTS commander); Suhaib al-Rawi (Governor of Anbar); Issa Sayyar Al Isawi (Mayor of Fallujah); Sayeer al-Essawie (Iraqi Major of Fallujah) (Iran) Qasem Soleimani (Head of the Quds Force)	Abu Waheeb † (Top ISIL commander in Anbar); Hussein Alawi † (ISIL commander in south Fallujah); Ayad Marzouk al-Anbari † (Senior ISIL Fallujah commander)

Units involved
Saraya al-Jihad; ISOF	Military of ISIL: Secret Police Force (Al-Hisbah)

Strength
11,000–14,500 fighters: 7,000–10,500 Iraqi soldiers; 4,000 Shi'ite militiamen	4,000 militants

Casualties and losses
180+ Iraqi tribesmen captured, and 10 executed	248+ killed (By 20 May)
- 140 civilians dead from starvation Hundreds of people executed
- 90,000 civilians are besieged in Fallujah (April 2016 estimate): Iraqi forces capture Al-Karmah; Iraqi Armed forces recapture Fallujah on 26 June 2016; Abu Waheeb (executed) (Top ISIL commander in Anbar); Hussein Alawi † (ISIL commander in south Fallujah) Ayad Marzouk al-Anbari † (Senior ISIL Fallujah commander)

The siege of Fallujah was an offensive launched in February 2016 by the Iraqi government against the Islamic State of Iraq and the Levant (ISIL) in al-Karmah and in the city of Fallujah, with the aim of enforcing a siege of the latter. During the early stages of the operation, local Sunni residents revolted against ISIL for a period of three days. On 22 May, after completing preparations around the city, the Iraqi Army and supporting Shi'ite militias launched the third Battle of Fallujah.

== Background ==
On 4 January 2014, ISIL, then known as the al-Qaeda-affiliated Islamic State of Iraq, captured the city of Fallujah after Iraqi government forces withdrew from the city following a five-day battle. This victory allowed ISIL to capture its first city on Iraqi soil and also allowed them to establish a stronghold only 40 kilometers (25 miles) from the Iraqi capital of Baghdad.

From April to May 2015, the Iraqi Army launched an offensive in and around the town of al-Karmah. During the offensive, the Iraqi Army made some limited gains in the al-Karmah area by capturing some territory in the town. In addition, the Iraqi Army built a base for a future assault to fully recapture both Fallujah and al-Karmah.

In mid-May 2015, ISIL captured Ramadi after a large series of suicide attacks during a sandstorm prompted Iraqi forces to abandon the city to ISIL. Two months later, the Iraqi security forces recovered from their loss in the Anbar's provincial capital, and on 13 July 2015, launched an offensive to recapture Anbar Province. During the offensive, ISIL suffered a major blow after they lost Ramadi to Iraqi government forces in February 2016.

On 1 February, the Iraqi Army launched an offensive on the Khalidiya Island area, which is the region located between the villages Albu Nasir and Albu Shajal, situated between Ramadi and Fallujah. On the same day, the Iraqi Army managed to capture the villages of Albu Shalib and Albu Shajal, to the northwest of Fallujah.

== The offensive ==
=== Total siege begins ===
On 2 February, the Iraqi Army fully severed the last supply lines between the Khalidiya Island region and the city of Fallujah, completely besieging the city. This led to concerns that an estimated 30,000–60,000 civilians trapped in Fallujah would starve, due to the lack of airdropped supplies into the city. On 10 February, it was reported that the Iraqi Army had fully recaptured the Khalidiya District, including the Khalidiya Island area.

=== Fallujah revolt and al-Karmah offensive ===
From 15 to 19 February, the Iraqi Army launched an offensive into the town of al-Karmah, located northeast of Fallujah, killing dozens of ISIL militants.

On 18 February, a large number of local Sunni tribesmen revolted against ISIL, after ISIL beat a woman, among other restrictive practices enforced by ISIL's Hisbah secret police, amid the ongoing siege. ISIL was reported to have withdrawn into Fallujah city, after local Sunnis burned the Hisbah headquarters and clashes spread. On 20 February, the clashes began to decrease as ISIL began carrying out mass arrests, and it was reported that there were still some Sunni fighters who were pinned down in parts of Fallujah, who would likely be massacred if the Iraqi government or the US-led CJTF–OIR coalition did not intervene. On 21 February, the Iraqi Army began shelling ISIL positions on the outskirts of Fallujah, in support of the Sunni tribal fighters. Late on 21 February, ISIL crushed the revolt, and detained 180 men. On the same day, the Iraqi Army deployed reinforcements to Fallujah in preparation to storm the city.

On 23 February, the Iraqi Army fully recaptured the town of al-Karmah after they destroyed ISIL's last stronghold in the town.

On 24 February, a CJTF–OIR coalition airstrike killed 30 ISIL militants in the Karama sub-district, just east of Fallujah.

=== Tightening the siege ===
On 25 February, the Iraqi governor of Anbar province stated that the battle for Fallujah would begin soon, and that it would be much shorter than the battle for Ramadi. On the same day, the Iraqi Army tightened their siege on Fallujah, pushing into the outskirts of the city and securing all of the bridges leading into the city. On the same day, the Iraqi Army cleared the Albu Daeig district in southern Fallujah, killing 19 ISIL militants. It was also reported that ISIL was using food as a weapon in Fallujah, denying food supplies to the people it suspected of having links to the rebel tribesmen or being non-ISIL sympathizers.

On 27 February, the Iraqi government reported that 600 ISIL fighters had managed to flee Fallujah to nearby areas, and to the city of Mosul. After the defections, local sources estimated that there were only 400 ISIL militants remaining inside Fallujah city. On 28 February, the Shi'ite militia forces repelled an ISIL counterattack on al-Karmah, which was described as one of the largest attacks on the town. Later on the same day, Iraqi government forces repelled a massive ISIL suicide attack in Abu Ghraib and western Baghdad, which was the largest attack carried out by the group in the area in nearly two years. The assault left 48 ISIL militants and 23 Iraqi soldiers dead.

On 4 April, Iraqi security forces killed 150 ISIL fighters near Fallujah. CJTF–OIR coalition spokesman Col. Steve Warren said that US forces in Iraq could not confirm the number of extremist fighters killed, but some 100 militants were killed on the same day by airstrikes conducted by the coalition, which could have been part of the tally.

On 6 April, eight Iraqi soldiers were killed in an attack launched by ISIL on a military barracks in al-Ma'amel village, east of Fallujah. On 9 April, ten civilians were killed and 25 others were injured after Iraqi Army airstrikes and artillery shelling targeted the al-Fallujah market and Nezal district in the downtown area of the city. On 10 April, six ISIL militants were killed by Iraqi Army artillery shelling in the area of Falahat, west of the city.

On 21 April, the US-led coalition conducted an airstrike on an ISIL gathering in the Ahsi area near Amiriyah Fallujah, killing the top ISIL commander in southern Fallujah, along with six of his assistants. On 26 April, warplanes bombarded a number of areas in al-Resala, central Fallujah, resulting in the death of eight civilians, including three children, and wounding 13 others. On 27 April, six ISIL militants were killed and five others were wounded, when the Iraqi Army bombarded ISIL positions in the city with artillery. On 28 April, coalition aircraft conducted three airstrikes on ISIL headquarters in the al-Rofah area, north of al-Karma District, killing 15 ISIL terrorists, including three leaders, named Khattab al-Halabusi, Aush al-Shami, and Mosadaq Abdel Galil. Meanwhile, an ISIL vehicle carrying machine guns was also destroyed.

On 30 April, unidentified fighters attacked a gathering of ISIL militants near the Alwa area in the al-Joulan neighborhood, in central Fallujah, killing seven ISIL militants. On 2 May, Iraqi security forces carried out a large-scale military operation targeting ISIL gatherings in the al-Falahat area, killing 15 ISIL members and injuring ten others, as well as bombing a laboratory for manufacturing booby-trapped vehicles.

On 3 May, the Iraqi Army and allied militia forces launched an offensive in the southern Fallujah area, capturing the areas between Amiriyah and Fallujah city. By the next day, Iraqi government forces had come within 3 kilometers of Fallujah's southern entrance, capturing four villages, killing 100 ISIL militants, and destroying ten ISIL tunnels.

On the morning of 5 May, violent clashes broke out between two ISIL factions belonging in Nazzal neighborhood, in central Fallujah, after the theft of 700 million dinars that were deposited with one of the ISIL leaders called Jabbar Auf, resulting in the killing of ten ISIL members and injuring eight others. Meanwhile, Anbar Operations Commander Major General Ismail Mahlawi told Anadolu Agency that the Iraqi Army had captured five areas of the city.

On 7 May, Iraqi security forces conducted operations that targeted the headquarters and gatherings of ISIL in the areas of al-Hur and Zebin al-Hanshl in the vicinity of Amiriyah Fallujah, resulting in the death of 25 ISIL elements.

On 8 May, coalition warplanes carried out an airstrike on ISIL positions in south of Fallujah, killing 14 ISIL militants. Warplanes also destroyed three car bombs and killed their suicide bombers as they were trying to attack Iraqi security forces in the same area near Fallujah.

On 9 May, the Iraqi Air Force bombarded two ISIL buildings, two caches of weapons, and 60 rocket launchers in the area of Albu Shehab and Amiriyah Fallujah. Earlier on the same the day, 20 ISIL militants were killed during an aerial bombardment in south of Fallujah. Between 4–9 May, 140 ISIL militants were killed in clashes in the western and southern suburbs of Fallujah.

On 10 May, it was reported that 2,000 families were trapped in two villages, Albu Huwa and Hasai, and were being used as human shields by ISIL.

On 11 May, eight ISIL militants were killed and two more were wounded, as coalition warplanes conducted two airstrikes against a booby-trapped ISIL vehicle near the Fallahat and Halabisah villages.

On 14 May, ISIL forces claimed to have killed 100+ Iraqi forces in a large suicide attack at the residential compound in Amiriyah Fallujah. Another report put the death toll at 70 soldiers and one policeman.

== Aftermath – late May offensive ==
On 22 May, after the prolonged siege, the Iraqi Army announced that it was building up its forces around Fallujah, in preparation for a large-scale assault on the city that would soon be initiated. According to Iraqi military leaders, these plans were in place to build on the momentum from a recent victory against ISIL in the town of Rutbah and were also in place to degrade ISIL's ability to conduct suicide bombings in Baghdad; the recent Baghdad attacks that killed up to 200 civilians were widely believed to have come out of Fallujah. The army sent messages to besieged residents to "be prepared to leave Fallujah through secured routes that will be announced later." According to the UNHCR, 80 families had managed to escape before 24 May, however, the danger was made clear through civilian contacts who said that ISIL death squads "will kill anybody in Fallujah who leaves their house or waves a white flag."

The Popular Mobilization Forces declared on 23 May that they had captured Sejar and fully captured al-Karmah, about 16 kilometers (10 miles) northeast of Fallujah, bringing most of the territory east of Fallujah under government control. They also announced the liberation of al-Harariyat, al-Shahabi and al-Dwaya and the killing of 40 ISIL militants during the military operation. The Iraqi government announced that pro-government fighters had captured the villages of Luhaib and Albu Khanfar on 24 May.

On 25 May, 16 towns and districts on the eastern outskirts of Fallujah were cleared by Iraqi security forces. An additional 123 ISIL militants, 15 civilians and 35 Iraqi forces and militiamen were killed in clashes which gained the Iraqi army control over the remaining districts in the southeast, allowing them to create a corridor that cut the ISIL-controlled zone into two sections. According to Qasm Araji, a member of the defense committee, the advancing forces were continuously gaining ground and "nearing Fallujah's Eastern gate."

== Humanitarian impact ==
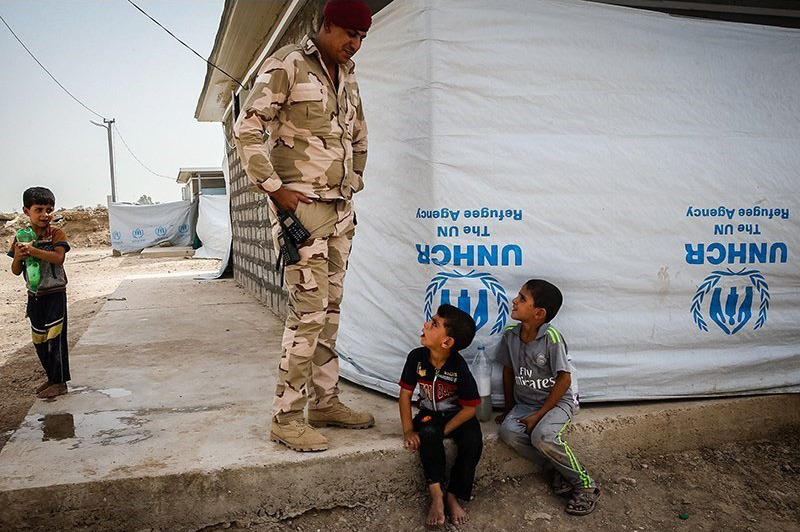
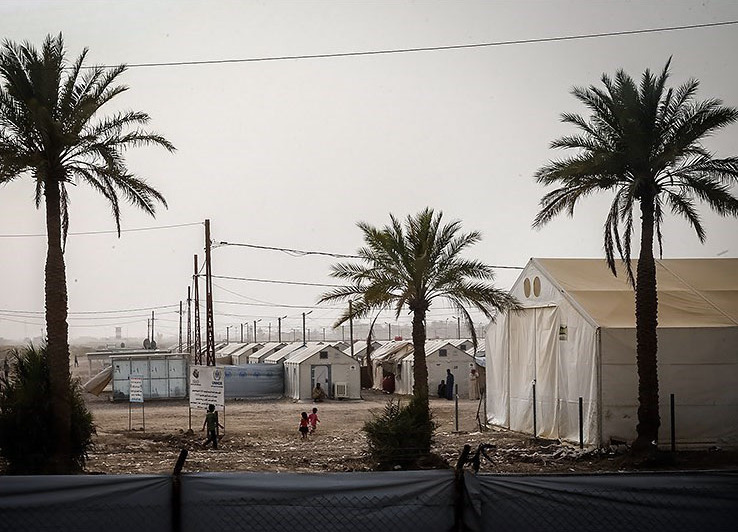
The refugees in Abu Ghraib camp

As the siege tightened and shortages intensified, tens of thousands of Iraqis trapped in Fallujah were left without regular access to food and medicine. While Iraqi authorities stated that there were 50,000 people left in the city during the siege, local sources said the number was as high as 196,000. Many human rights experts deemed the situation in Fallujah as a humanitarian disaster, and the situation only became more dire after 22 May 2016, when the Iraqi Army launched a direct assault on the city.

Supplies were available in some stores, but only for ISIL fighters or sympathizers, according to local reports. Iraqi officials said that negotiations led by the International Red Cross were ongoing in an attempt to get ISIL to allow some aid teams to enter into the city and provide basic assistance. Hekmat Sulaiman, the spokesperson for the governor of Anbar province, said that the Iraqi Army had tried to deliver food to the civilians, but that ISIL had blocked the efforts. A senior federal security official confirmed that negotiations were ongoing, but declined to specify whether the talks were happening with ISIL leaders inside the city, or elsewhere.

The Iraqi government did not prepare the residents of Fallujah with assistance before cutting off supply lines at the start of the siege. The destruction of the city's infrastructure by airstrikes only intensified the humanitarian disaster. Houses, schools, sewage pipes, and electric and water lines became increasingly unusable by the residents left in the city, and there were documented reports that women and children were forced to sleep outside in the harsh weather. Some residents reported that they had no fuel to heat themselves during the cold winter. Many residents were unable to access the medical care and supplies they needed, an issue which intensified after Fallujah hospital was shelled during the subsequent offensive in late May.

=== Enforced disappearances and executions ===
As the Iraqi Army tightened its siege of the city, local reports indicated that ISIL grew bloodier and more desperate, terrorizing and increasing its aggression against Fallujah's residents. ISIL death squads were reportedly roaming the streets, saying they will kill anybody in Fallujah who leaves their house or waves a white flag.

On 30 March, a commander of the Popular Mobilization Forces units, Colonel Mahmoud Mardi Jumaili, said ISIL killed 35 people in the central district of Fallujah after accusing them of attempting to escape from the city. On 4 April, ISIL reportedly burned 15 civilians to death for trying to escape Fallujah. On 14 April, a security source said ISIL militants began a massive offensive in the al-Halabese and al-Bualawan areas of Western Fallujah, abducting at least 100 Iraqi civilians. ISIL elements took the abducted civilians to the organization's prisons in the city.

Iraqi pro-government militia groups also participated in systematically abducting and executing civilians who fled the area, claiming that they were associated with ISIL. It has since become clear that the Shia militia groups (associated with the Popular Mobilization Forces) deliberately targeted families who were known to be Sunni Arabs for the furtherance of their sectarian agenda. In several instances, entire families were either disappeared or executed, which lent evidence to the fact that fighting ISIL was often a pretext for sectarian violence. Most of those civilians abducted by the militias were disappeared; to this day, their locations and whereabouts remain unknown.

In 2020, the United Nations Assistance Mission in Iraq (UNAMI) and the Office of the United Nations High Commissioner for Human Rights (OHCHR) published a report regarding the enforced disappearances from Anbar province during this time. Evidence included in the report estimated that around 1,000 civilians were subject to enforced disappearances and "related violations." However, there is credible evidence that the number of individuals forcibly disappeared from Fallujah and surrounding areas, both during the siege and in the subsequent battle, is much higher. The report also notes that little progress has been made in locating forcibly disappeared civilians.

For more information on violations in 2015-2016 in the Anbar province, see Third Battle of Fallujah.

== See also ==
- Al-Hawl offensive
- Battle of Baiji (2014–15)
- Battle of Baiji (October–December 2014)
- December 2014 Sinjar offensive
- Derna Campaign (2014–15)
- Fall of Hīt (2014)
- Fall of Mosul
- First Battle of Tikrit
- List of wars and battles involving ISIL
- Military intervention against ISIL
  - American-led intervention in Syria
- Mosul offensive (2015)
- November 2015 Sinjar offensive
- Second Battle of Tikrit (March–April 2015)
- Siege of Amirli
- Siege of Kobanî
- Sinjar massacre
- Tishrin Dam offensive
- Al-Shaddadi offensive (2016)
- Hīt offensive (2016)
- Ar-Rutbah offensive (2016)
