= HASI (disambiguation) =

HASI was a non-legal Basque political party.

HASI may also refer to:

- 18110 HASI, a main-belt asteroid
- Hubbard Association of Scientologists International, a scientology organization founded in 1954
- Hasi (company) focused on investments in "sustainable infrastructure".

== See also ==
- Hasi (disambiguation)
