= Fallujah Barrage =

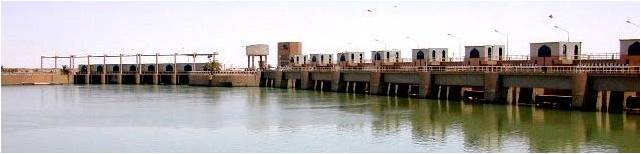

- Location within Iraq
- Interactive map of Fallujah Barrage
- Location: Al Anbar Governorate, Iraq
- Coordinates: 33°18′31″N 43°46′21″E
- Opening date: 1985

Dam and spillways
- Impounds: Euphrates

The Fallujah Barrage is a barrage on the Euphrates near Fallujah in Al Anbar Governorate, Iraq. Construction of the barrage was completed in 1985. Unlike many other dams in the Euphrates, the Fallujah Barrage does not include a hydroelectric power station and its main function is to raise the water level of the river for irrigation. The barrage consists of two separate parts. The main stretch of the barrage has ten gates measuring 16 by 8.5 metres (52 ft × 28 ft), allowing a maximum discharge of 3,600 cubic metres (130,000 cu ft) per second. The second part on the left bank of the river has eight gates that are 6 metres (20 ft) wide. These gates divert water toward two separate irrigation channels. Their maximum discharge is 104 cubic metres (3,700 cu ft) per second.

The construction of the Fallujah Barrage was first proposed in 1923 as part of a large project to increase the production of cotton in Iraq. Construction of the barrage did however start only much later. The barrage was constructed adjacent to the actual Euphrates channel so that the water did not have to be diverted during construction. The Euphrates flow was only diverted toward the barrage in 1985 when it was completed. It was intended that 225,000 hectares (560,000 acres) would be irrigated as part of this project. After the 2003 invasion of Iraq, repairs have been carried out at the Fallujah Barrage.

During the Islamic State of Iraq and the Levant's attack on Fallujah in January 2014, ISIL militants took control of the barrage and closed its floodgates for several days which briefly deprived downstream areas of water. The gates were later opened likely due to flooding in upstream areas and excessive reservoir levels. The militants also opened the dam in an attempt to flood oncoming Iraqi forces.
