= Khan al Baghdadi =

- Location within Iraq
- Coordinates: 33°51′9″N 42°32′51″E
- Country: Iraq
- Province: Al-Anbar

Population (2008)
  - Total: 5,000
- Time zone: UTC+3 (GMT+3)
- Postal code: 31014

Khan al-Baghdadi (Arabic: خان البغدادي Ḫān al-Baġdādī) or al-Baghdadi is an Iraqi city on the Euphrates River in al-Anbar province (Hīt District). Its inhabitants are mostly Sunni Arabs.

It is the closest village to the U.S. Military's Al Asad Airbase, (formerly known as Qadisiyah Airbase under Saddam Hussein's rule). It was the site of a major battle with the Islamic State in February 2015. IS captured most of the town by 14 February 2015. On 6 March 2015, Iraqi forces managed to recapture the town from IS.
