= Hit District =

Hīt District قضاء هيت
- District
- Interactive map of Hīt District
- Country: Iraq
- Governorates: Al Anbar Governorate
- Time zone: UTC+3 (AST)

Hīt (Arabic: قضاء هيت) is a district in Al Anbar Governorate, Iraq. It is centered on the city of Hīt, this district has between 75,000 and 90,000 inhabitants.

== Cities ==
- Hīt (35,000)
- Kabisa (10,000)
- Al Baghdadi (15,000)
- Al Furat (4,000)
- Al Mhamdy (1,000)
- Al Khuthah (3,000)
- Aqabah (7,000)
- Azwaiha (5,000)
- Jebbeh (4,000)
- Hawija Heat (1,000)
