= Highway 12 (Iraq) =

Road in Iraq

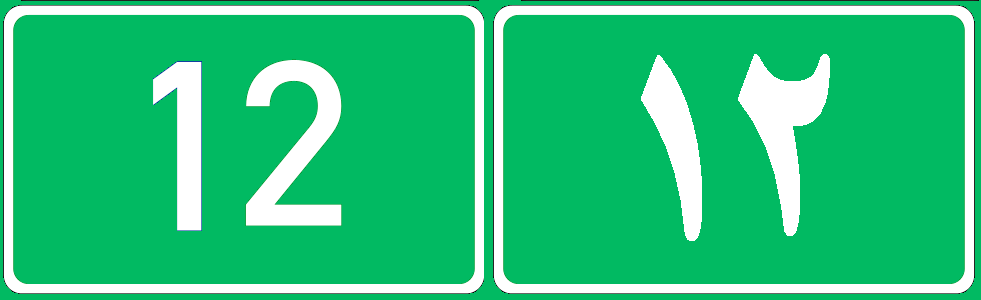
Highway 12
- ١٢ طريق رقم

Location
- Country: Iraq

Highway system
- Highways in Iraq

Highway 12 is an Iraqi highway which connects Baghdad to Syria. It extends from Al Ramadi, through Hīt, Haditha, Al-Karābilah, to the Syria frontier (Abu Kamal).
