= 36th Commando Battalion =

1st Commando Battalion
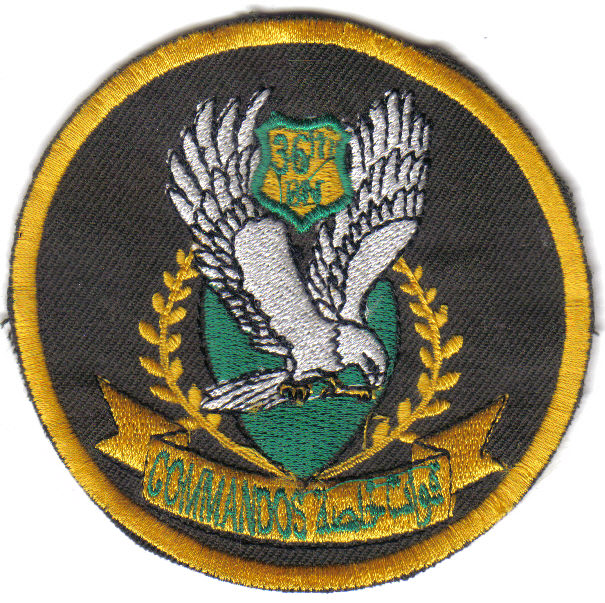
- 36th Commando Battalion patch
- Active: 26 December 2003 – present
- Country: Iraq
- Branch: ISOF
- Type: Commando
- Size: ~ 400 (2004)
- Part of: 1st Special Operations Forces Brigade, Iraqi Counter Terrorism Service
- Nicknames: 36th CDO BN; 1st CDO BN
- Engagements: Iraq War; Iraqi insurgency; War in Iraq (2013-2017)

Commanders
- Notable commanders: Fadhil al-Barwari (Commander 2003-2004) Hussam Sami Al Kinany (Commander 2003-2006) Talib Shgati Al Kinany (Commander 2003-2004 Abdulghani Al Assadi (Commander 2003-2004)

The 1st Commando Battalion (1st CDO BN) is a commando battalion unit of the 1st Special Operations Brigade (ISOF-1) and part of the Iraqi Counter Terrorism Service (CTS), and one of several Iraqi special forces units created after the fall of the Saddam Hussein.

Originally part of the Iraqi Special Operations Forces Brigade (ISOF BDE), the unit has a role comparable to that of the United States' 75th Ranger Regiment (Army Rangers). The unit was formerly designated as the 36th Commando Battalion, part of the Iraqi Special Operations Forces Brigade (ISOF BDE).

The unit was formerly known as the 36th Iraqi Civil Defense Corps Battalion.

== History ==
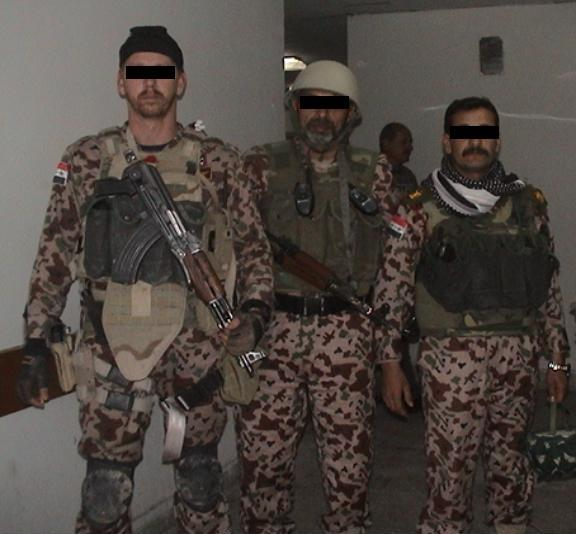
Left to right: MSG Ron, C co SGM and C co. Commander (Identities censored for security reasons)

On 25 November 2003, a decision was made between the Coalition Provisional Authority (CPA), the Commander United States Central Command (CDRCENTCOM), the Commander Combined Joint Task Force 7 (CDR CJTF-7), and the Iraqi Governing Council (IGC). These elements agreed to form a Baghdad-based, 500-man battalion by integrating militiamen from five (5) Political Parties: Iraqi National Accord (INA), Iraqi National Congress (INC), Kurdish Democratic Party (KDP), Patriotic Union of Kurdistan (PUK), and Supreme Council for Islamic Revolution in Iraq (SCIRI). The idea was to create a special forces unit that would be composed of Iraqis from various ethnic and religious groups.

In late 2003, the CJSOTF-AP (Combined Joint Special Operations Task Force-Arabian Peninsula) made plans to put the 36th CDO BN under the control of the Iraqi Counter Terrorism Force (ICTF). Initial recruits sent to be trained with the 36th CDO BN were given table tennis paddles to publicly hide their activities that they were going for SOF training. Recruits who changed their mind to join the battalion were taken off the roster. The unit changed its name to the 1st Commando Battalion after the Iraqi Special Operations Forces (ISOF) Brigade was created in July 2005.

During the war against the Islamic State in 2017, the battalion was known to be militarily and politically reliable as they fought ISIL fighters instead of abandoning their positions unlike other military units like the Iraqi Army's 2nd Division.

== Operations ==
36th CDO BN forces were involved in Najaf in August 2004, nearly raiding Sadr's hideout if he did not choose to give up. In November 2004, 36th CDO BN forces were deployed to Fallujah alongside US Marines to flush out anti-government insurgents, taking control of a hospital from insurgents. They were also involved in Samarra, engaged in counterinsurgency and counterterrorism operations in September 2004.

The 1st CDO BN was involved in anti-ISIL operations, engaging ISIL fighters in Mosul in 2017.

== Organization ==
The 36th CDO BN was organized based on the structure of the US Army Special Forces.

In 2004, the 36th CDO BN had 400 operators, trained by 17 US Special Forces advisors.

As of 2023, the unit is under the command of the Iraqi Counter Terrorism Service.
