= Fadhil Barwari =

Iraqi military officer

Fadhil Jamil Barwari
- فاضل جميل برواري
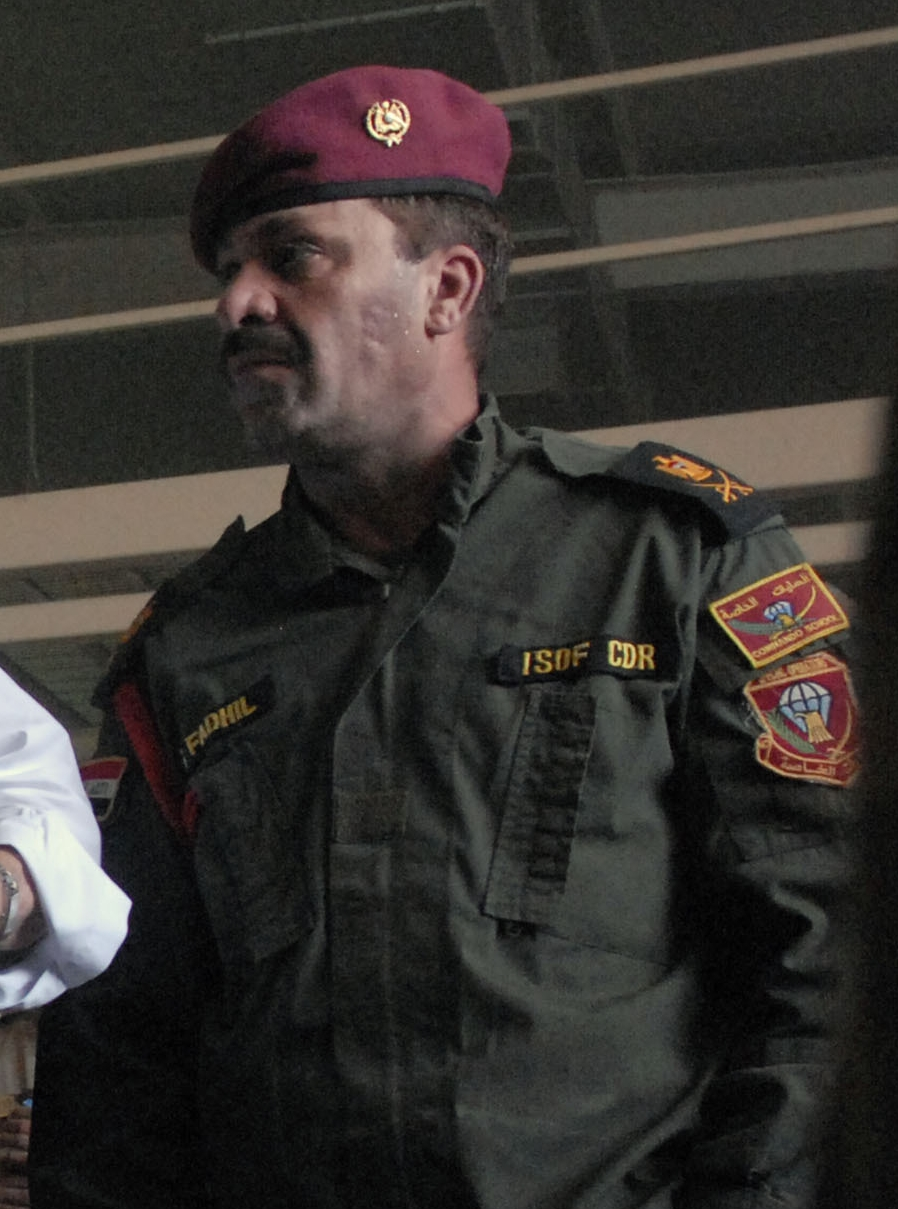
- Barwari in 2009
- Born: 1 April 1966; Dohuk, Iraqi Republic
- Died: 20 September 2018 (aged 52); Erbil, Kurdistan Region, Iraq
- Military career
- Allegiance: (Kurdistan Region) Peshmerga (1980s–2003); Iraq (2003–2018)
- Branch: ISOF
- Service years: 1980s–2018
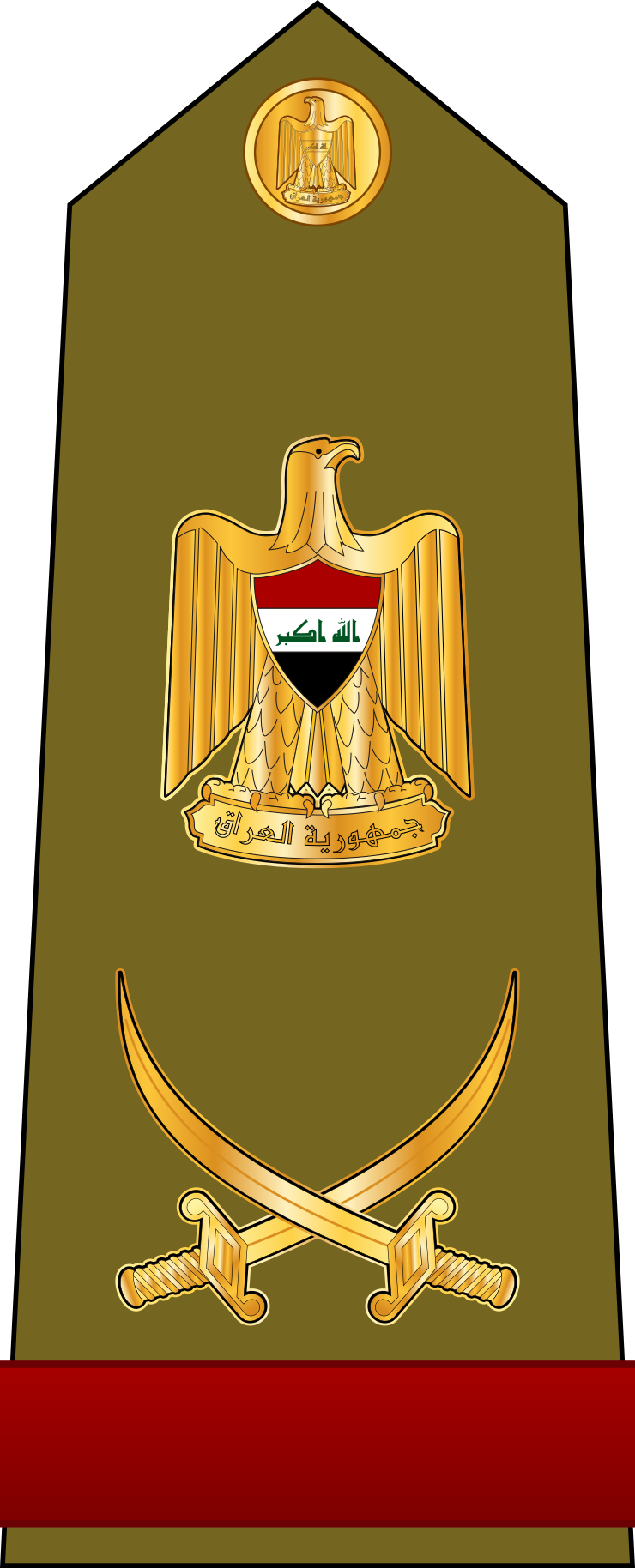
- Rank: Major General
- Unit: 36th Commando Battalion
- Conflicts: Iraq War; 2004 Battle of Samarra; Operation Sayeed; Second Battle of Fallujah; Ninawa campaign; 2008 Iraq spring fighting; Battle of Basra; Iraqi insurgency (2003–2011); 2010 Baghdad church attack; War in Iraq (2013–2017); 2014 Anbar Campaign; Battle of Mosul (2016–17)

Fadhil Jamil Barwari (1 April 1966 – 20 September 2018) was an Iraqi army general who served as the commander of the ISOF-1 brigade of the Iraqi Counter Terrorism Service. Prior to that, he served as the commander of the 36th Commando Battalion. In November 2017, Barwari was implicated in a corruption scandal to "cheat the US State Department out of millions of dollars". He died of a heart attack in 2018.

Barwari was a graduate of the Second Iraqi Military Academy in Zakho.

== Early life and education ==
Barwari was born in Duhok in 1 April 1966, to a Kurdish family. Prior to joining the Peshmerga, a Kurdish resistance movement that opposed the Ba'athist government, he attended and graduated from the Second Iraqi Military Academy in Zahko.

He started out as a Lieutenant in 1988, 1st Lieutenant in 1991, Captain in 1992 and Major in 1994 in the Peshmerga. After rejoining, in the new Iraqi Army he became a Lieutenant Colonel in 2003, Colonel in 2005, Brigadier General in 2007 and finally Major General in 2008.

== Career ==
Barwari rejoined the new Iraqi Army in 2003 after the U.S. invasion. He quickly rose through the ranks of the military ladder, becoming the commanding officer of the Iraqi 36th Commando Battalion in 2004. In 2005, the first Iraqi Special Operations Forces Brigade (ISOF-1) was formed, and the 36th Commando Battalion was incorporated into the brigade. The 36th Commando Battalion was then renamed the 1st Commando Battalion, and Barwari then subsequently became the commander of ISOF-1 Brigade.

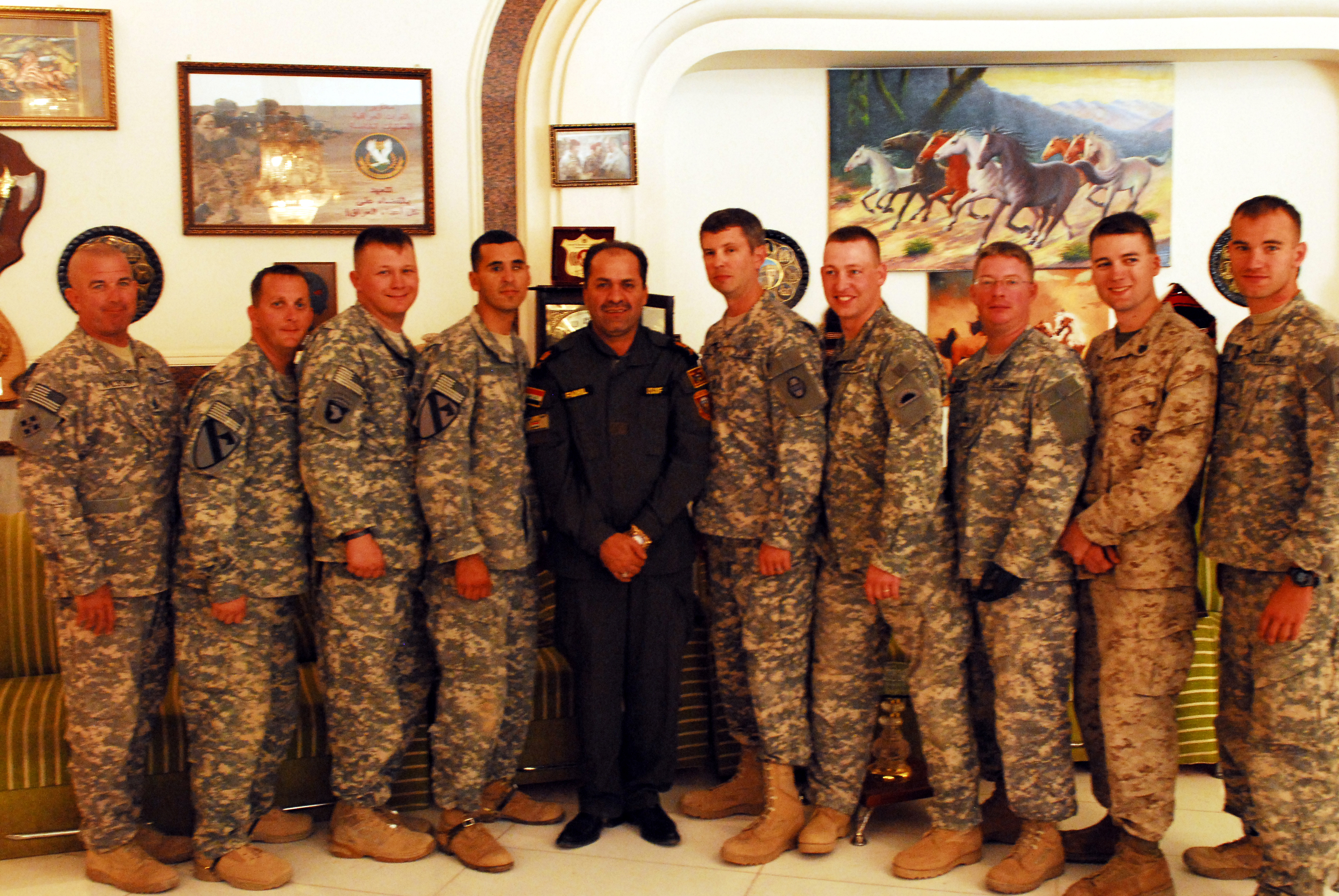
Maj. Gen. Fadhil Barwari (center) with combat veterans and Multi-National Force-Iraq Command Sgt. Maj. Lawrence Wilson (far left) during a visit to Baghdad on Oct. 16, 2009.

In 2007, ISOF-1 was incorporated into the newly founded Iraqi Counter Terrorism Service (ICTS), which is an elite security agency composed of a number of ISOF brigades trained by the Green Berets and equipped with American weaponry.

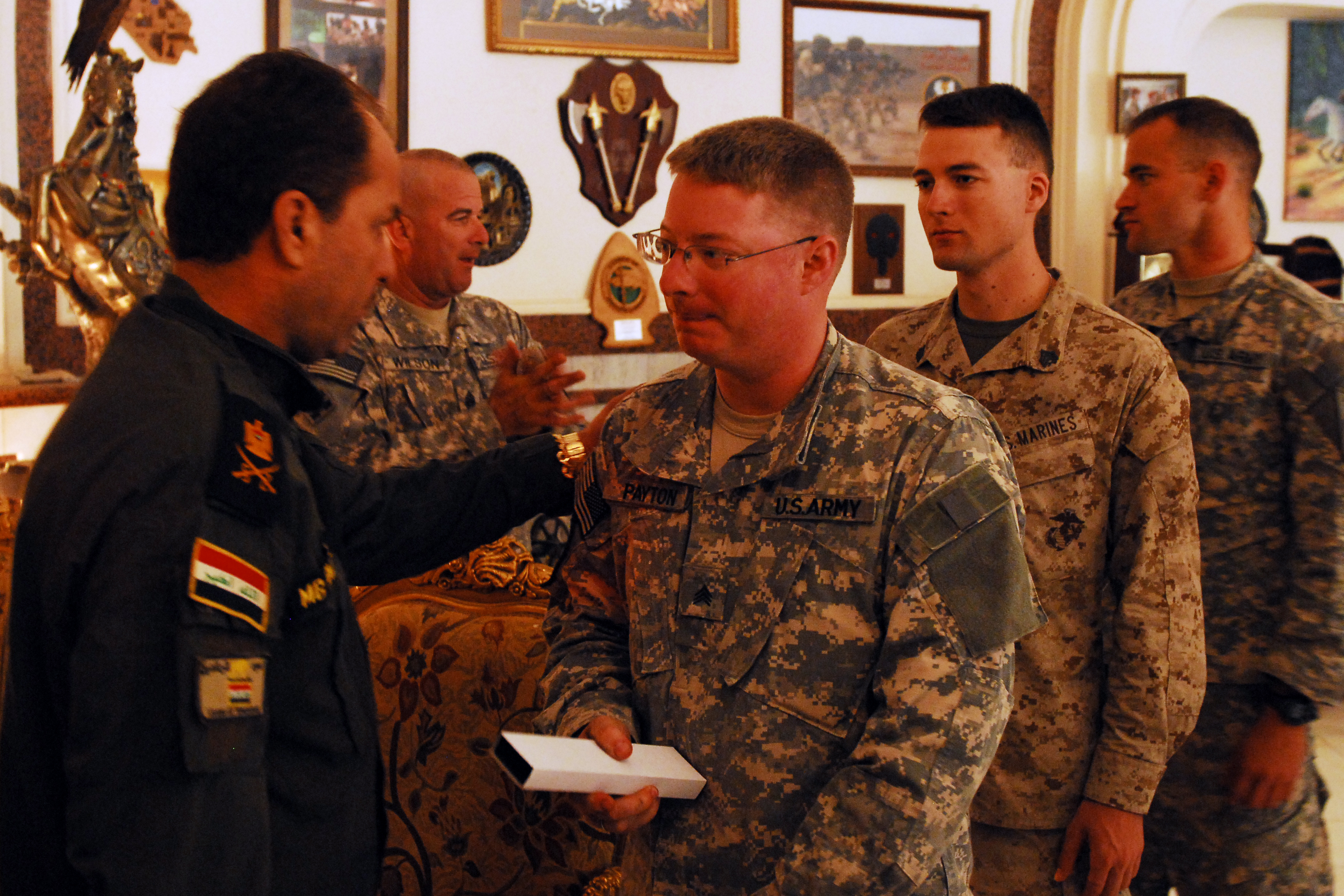
Maj. Gen. Fadhil Barwari (left) presents Sgt. Ethan Payton with a token of appreciation in Baghdad on Oct. 16, 2009. Payton lost his left arm in a 2004 ambush.

In April 2012 he was removed from the post of commander of ISOF-1 due to health issues and instead became the advisor to the head of the ICTS at the time, Talib Shaghati. In August 2013 he returned to his previous position as commander of ISOF-1. In this capacity, he directed ISOF-1 in the 2014 Anbar campaign. In August 2014 he led the brigade in the Mosul Dam offensive which saw Mosul Dam retaken by a joint Iraqi-Kurdish offensive. Barwari also led ISOF-1 in Ramadi, Tikrit, Samarra and Fallujah during the 2014-2016 battles against ISIL militants. In 2016 Barwari led the ISOF-1 brigade in tandem with other Iraqi government forces, including ISOF-2 brigade led by Maj. Gen. Ma’an al-Saadi in the liberation of Mosul which was the last ISIS stronghold in Iraq.

== Controversy ==
In November 2017, two former DynCorp workers testified in an Alexandria, Virginia federal court that Barwari paid them hundreds of thousands of dollars to arrange an overpriced lease of land the general owned near the Baghdad airport, starting in 2011.

== Alleged poisoning ==
Barwari died on 20 September 2018 from a heart attack. His sudden death was regarded by some as peculiar, arousing suspicions of foul play. According to an anonymous "noteworthy source" in Kurdistan Region, Barwari was allegedly poisoned after a loud verbal exchange with a Kurdish "senior security advisor" working for the Kurdistan Regional Government.

== See also ==
- Iraq War
- War on terror
- War in Iraq (2013-2017)
