= Pledging Conference in Support of Iraq =

The Pledging Conference in Support of Iraq took place in Washington, D.C., on July 20, 2016, and was co-hosted by the United States, Japan, Germany, the Netherlands, and Kuwait. The humanitarian pledging conference was announced by the United States Department of State on June 22, 2016, after a humanitarian crisis unfolded in Fallujah, Iraq due to the military operation to rid the city of Islamic State militants. Secretary of State, John Kerry, appealed the 26 country attendees for $2 billion US dollars to address four areas; immediate stabilization, expanding stabilization, dismantling of explosive devices, and humanitarian assistance.
