= Highway 11 (Iraq) =

Road in Iraq

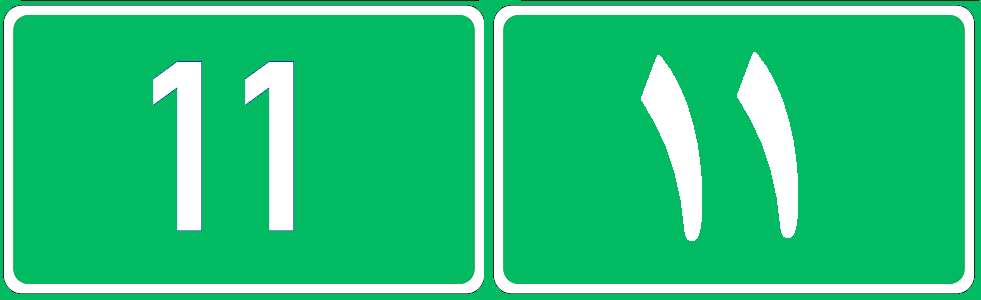
Highway 11
- ١١ طريق رقم

Location
- Country: Iraq

Highway system
- Highways in Iraq

Highway 11 is an Iraqi highway which extends from Baghdad to Syria along a southern route. It passes through Al Fallujah, Al Ramadi, Al Habbaniyah and Ar Rutbah.
