= Kabisa =

Kabisa كبيسة
- Location within Iraq
- Coordinates: 33°35′34″N 42°36′56″E
- Country: Iraq
- Province: Al-Anbar

Population
  - Total: 8,000
- Time zone: UTC+3 (GMT+3)
- Postal code: 31018

Kabisa or Kubaysah (Arabic: كبيسة) is an Iraqi city in the Hīt district of Al-Anbar province.

On 4 October 2014 it was captured by Islamic State forces. On 25 March 2016 it was recaptured by Iraqi Security Forces.
