= Amiriyah Fallujah =

Amiriyah Fallujah العامرية
- City
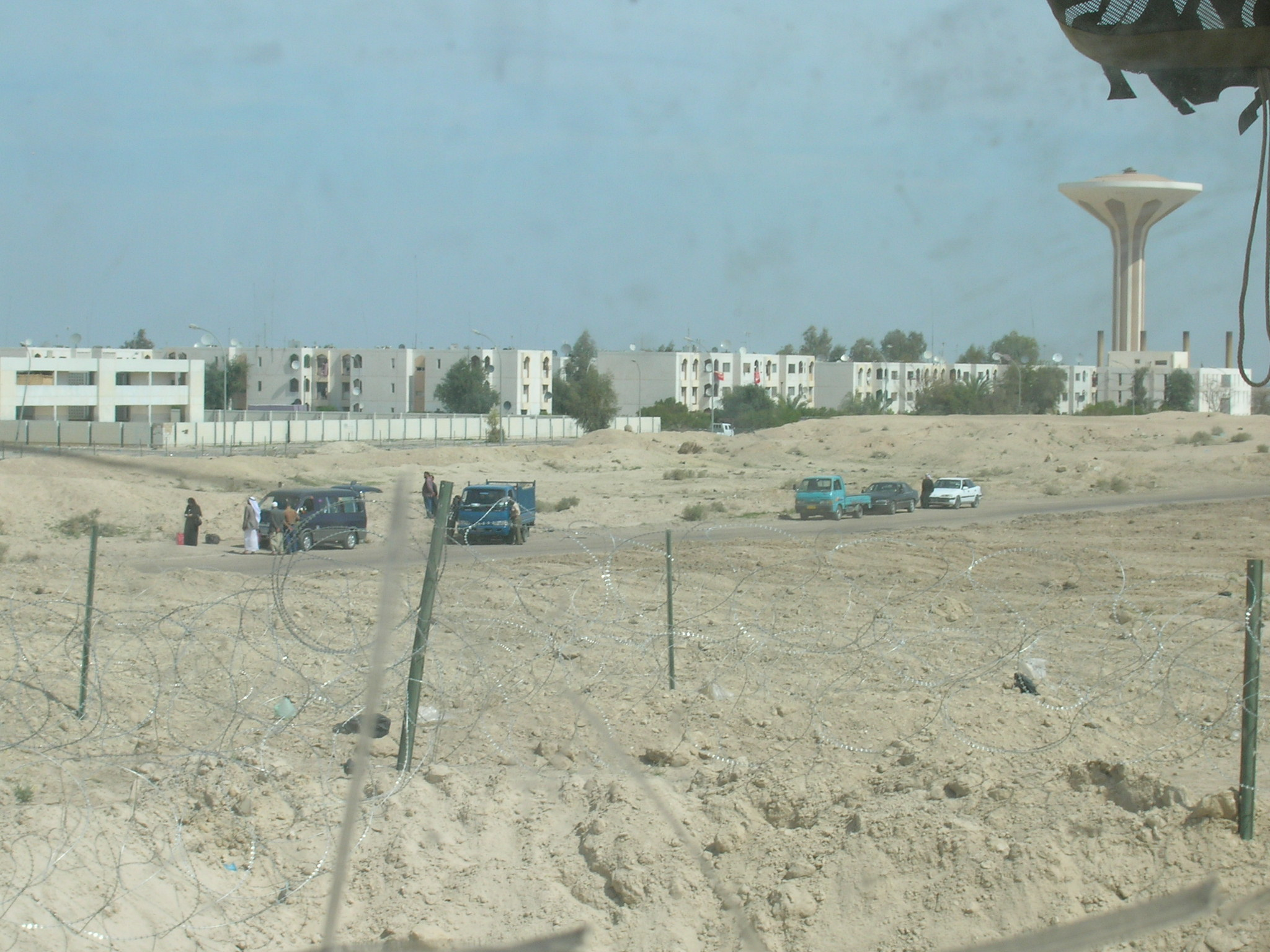
- Landscape of Al-Fares neighborhood of Amiriyah
- Interactive map of Amiriyah Fallujah
- Location in Iraq
- Coordinates: 33.165289°N 43.86549°E
- Country: Iraq
- Governorate: Al Anbar Governorate
- District: Fallujah District
- Seat: Amiriyah Fallujah

Population (2018)
  - Total: 24,000
- Majority from Dulaim tribe, specifically Albu Issa
- Time zone: UTC+3 (AST)
- Hosts 31 displaced persons camps (11,661 people as of 2019). Site of hostage crisis during the Gulf War and heavy clashes in the Iraq War and Siege of Fallujah (2016).

Al-Amiriyah (Arabic: العامرية al-ʻāmiriyyah) or Amiriyah Fallujah, also Ameriyah, Amiriyyah, Ameriya, Amiriyat, Ameriyat and the like, is a city in the Fallujah District of Al Anbar province, about 30 km (18 mi) south of the city of Fallujah, in Iraq, with a population of 24,000 as of 2018. Amiriyah residents belong mostly to the Albu Issa subtribe, part of the Dulaim tribe.

The city was named Amiriyah Fallujah after the American occupation of Iraq because it hosts a large number of displaced persons from the city of Fallujah. As of June 2019, the total population of all 31 of the displaced persons camps of Amiriyah Fallujah was 11,661 according to UN estimates.

During the lead up to the Gulf War in 1990, several Western hostages were held as a human shield at a suspected ammunition factory in the area from September 1990 until their release 6 December 1990. These included a crew member from British Airways Flight 149. Nationals of Britain, Japan, France, and Serbia were held on the site. Only the British were detained until December, the French and Japanese being released in October and November 1990 respectively. The nature of their internment makes it difficult to pinpoint the exact location, but they were told by their Iraqi minders that they were at "a factory in Amiriyah"

During the Iraq War, the city witnessed violent clashes such as those seen in the cities of Fallujah and Ramadi, as well as explosions and car bombs with chlorine attacks, but by 2007 the Anbar police had taken control over the city.

In 2016, during the Siege of Fallujah, there was intense fighting in the area between the Iraqi army and IS militants. Several suicide attacks by IS were also reported.
