= Hit, Iraq =

Hit هيت
- City
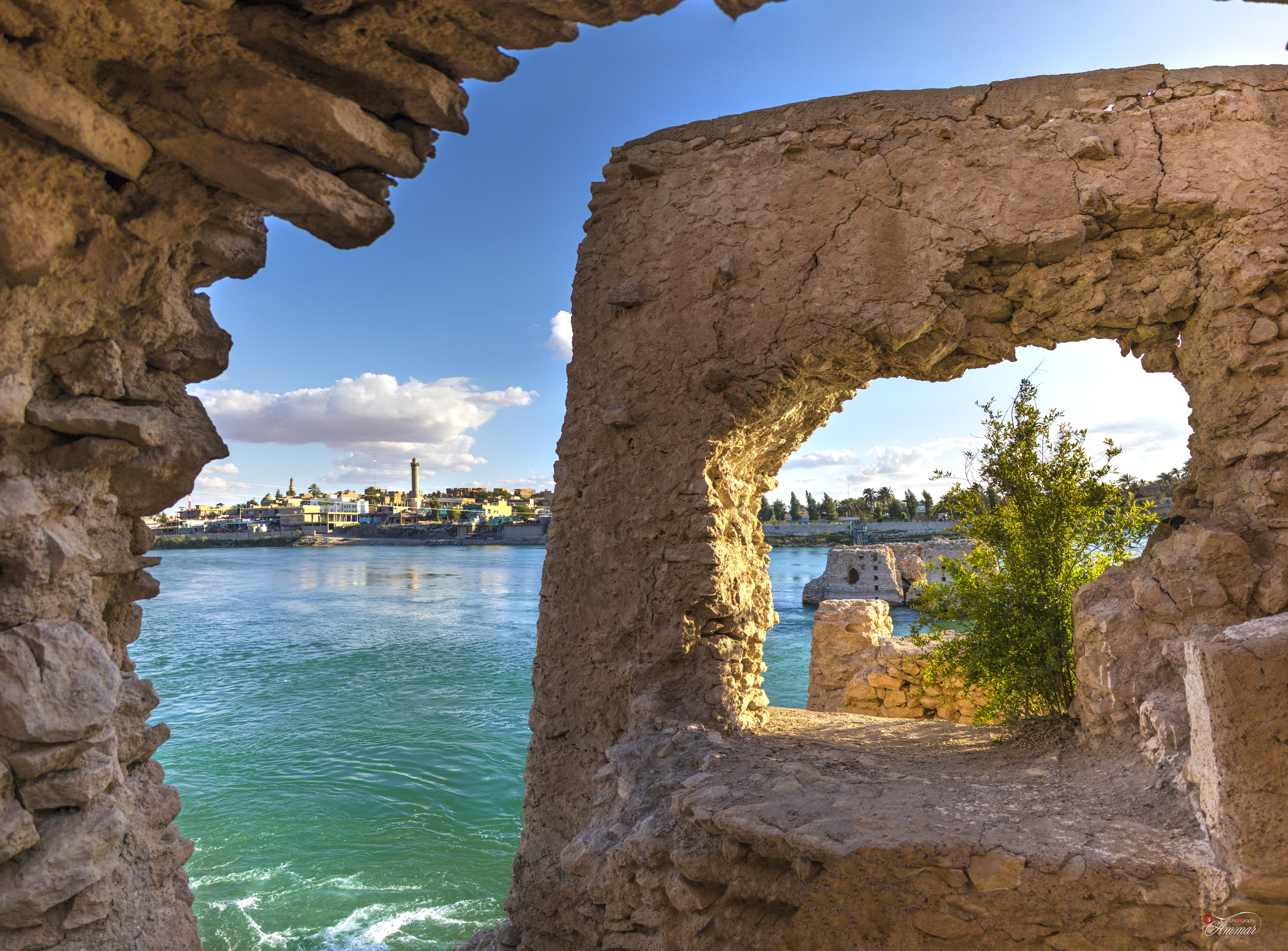
- Hit in 2020

- Location within Iraq
- Coordinates: 33°38′42″N 42°49′35″E
- Country: Iraq
- Province: al-Anbar
- District: Hīt District

Population (2024)
  - Total: 70,052
- Time zone: UTC+3 (GMT+3)
- Postal code: 31007
- Ancient name: Is

Hit or Heet (Arabic: هيت, Hīt) is a city in Al Anbar Governorate of Iraq. Situated on the banks of the Euphrates River, it lies northwest of Ramadi, the provincial capital. The city is administrative capital for Hit District. A major city in the central region, it has a population over 100,000.

Straddling the Euphrates, the city of Hit was originally a small walled town surrounded by a halt moat and built on two mounds on the site of the ancient city of Is. In ancient times, the town was known for its bitumen wells; bitumen from the wells was used in the construction of Babylon over 3000 years ago, and for tasks such as caulking boats. Hit also became a frontier fortress for Assyria. Now, Hit is a marketplace for agricultural produce. Oil pipelines to the Mediterranean Sea cross the Euphrates there. It was regarded as the head of navigation on the river before the decline in river traffic.

Hit marks the beginning of the high sedimentary plain on the Euphrates, and it contains a number of hot springs. The city of Hit is also famous for its ancient yet still functioning norias, a kind of water wheel that used to play an important role in the irrigation of fields and palm groves, particularly when water levels of the Euphrates receded. The walled town, which had already suffered extensive damage during the Ottoman Empire, was abandoned in the 1920s, leading to its rapid deterioration.

== History ==
In ancient times, the area around Hit was very fertile and was used for agriculture. During the Early Dynastic Period the Sumerians discovered bitumen wells in the region, which they used in building the Ziggurats. They also used it in shipbuilding, to waterproof their boats. During the era of the Akkadian Empire, when Sargon of Akkad (2334–2279 BC) unified ancient Iraq by conquering many Sumerian cities, he established a city near modern-day Hit which he called Tutul, meaning "City of Buckets".

This is the first name which is known for this city. Its importance was attested by Sargon himself, who said that the god Dagon gave him the area which comprised Tutul and Mari, capital of the Amorites. There is also an inscription by Naram-Sin which mentions Tutul, as one of the cities bequeathed to him by Dagon. The Akkadian kings after Naram-Sin were weak, which led to the establishment of a renewed Sumerian kingdom in 2120 BC. This kingdom included Tutul, and lasted until about 1950 BC.

In 1850 BC, the city-state of Eshnunna, which had begun in the Diyala Valley, took control of Tutul. Babylonia achieved preeminence in the area for a time, and was followed by Assyria. The Assyrian king Tiglath-Pileser I (r. 1114–1076 B.C.) changed the name of Tutul to Eru. During the era of Aramean expansion in the 11th century BC, they settled in Eru for a time before moving to southern Iraq. When the Neo-Assyrian Empire was established in 911 BC, they reasserted control of Eru. Cuneiform tablets from the time of Tukulti-Ninurta II (891–884 BC) mention the city and its bitumen wells. During this period the city was known as Atum or Hitum, meaning bitumen. The modern name Hit comes from Hitum. Hitum remained part of the Bablyonian-Chaldean empire until its fall in 539 BC.

The Greek historian Herodotus used the name Is (Ἴς) for the city, while other Greeks called it Isiopolis. Jewish scholars considered the Hit to be adjacent to the Land of Kir. During the era of the Parthian Empire, it was a waystation on the road to Ctesiphon. It was sacked multiple times during the Byzantine–Sasanian wars. During Julian's Persian War in 363, the Roman army encamped at Hit and destroyed much of the city. It was rebuilt by Shapur II.

As part of the Muslim conquest of Persia, Hit was conquered by the Arab army in 636. The defenders dug a moat around the city, but the Muslim army was able to penetrate it. In 639, the Muslim commander al-Harith ibn Yazid al-Amiri built the city's first mosque, Farouq Mosque.

Hit prospered during the medieval period. Ibn Hawqal remarked on its large population, and Hamdallah Mustawfi counted over 30 villages as its dependencies. The city produced a great deal of fruit; its noted agricultural products included nuts, dates, oranges, and eggplants. However, the neighboring bitumen springs produced an overpowering stench that made Hit unpleasant to live in.

In October 2014, the city had fallen to the Islamic State, but was recaptured after a military offensive by the Iraqi Army in April 2016.

Hit is mostly populated by the Al-Sawatra tribe.

== Climate ==
Hit has a hot desert climate (Köppen climate classification BWh). Most rain falls in the winter. The average annual temperature in Hit is 21.9 °C (71.4 °F). About 115 mm (4.53 in) of precipitation falls annually.

Climate data for Hit
Month	Jan	Feb	Mar	Apr	May	Jun	Jul	Aug	Sep	Oct	Nov	Dec	Year
Mean daily maximum °C (°F)	14.1 (57.4)	17.7 (63.9)	22.4 (72.3)	28.2 (82.8)	35.2 (95.4)	40.3 (104.5)	42.8 (109.0)	42.7 (108.9)	39.2 (102.6)	32.5 (90.5)	23.5 (74.3)	16.2 (61.2)	29.6 (85.2)
Mean daily minimum °C (°F)	3.2 (37.8)	4.6 (40.3)	8.7 (47.7)	13.9 (57.0)	19.1 (66.4)	22.8 (73.0)	25.4 (77.7)	24.8 (76.6)	21.0 (69.8)	15.5 (59.9)	9.1 (48.4)	4.5 (40.1)	14.4 (57.9)
Average precipitation mm (inches)	15 (0.6)	18 (0.7)	20 (0.8)	27 (1.1)	1 (0.0)	0 (0)	0 (0)	0 (0)	0 (0)	3 (0.1)	14 (0.6)	17 (0.7)	115 (4.5)
Source: Climate-Data.org, Climate data

== Gallery ==
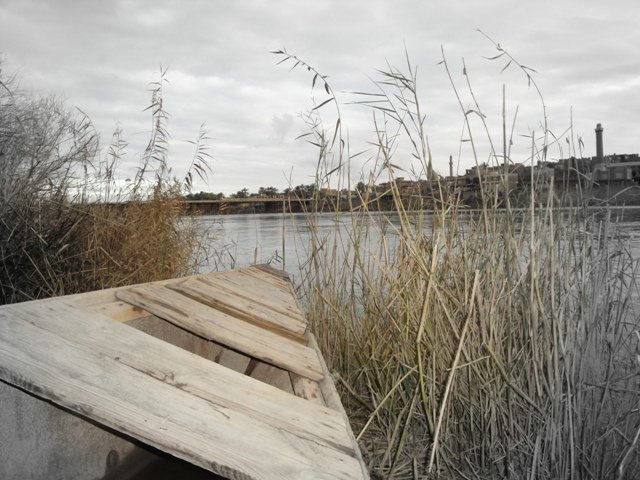
Hit, Iraq, 2004

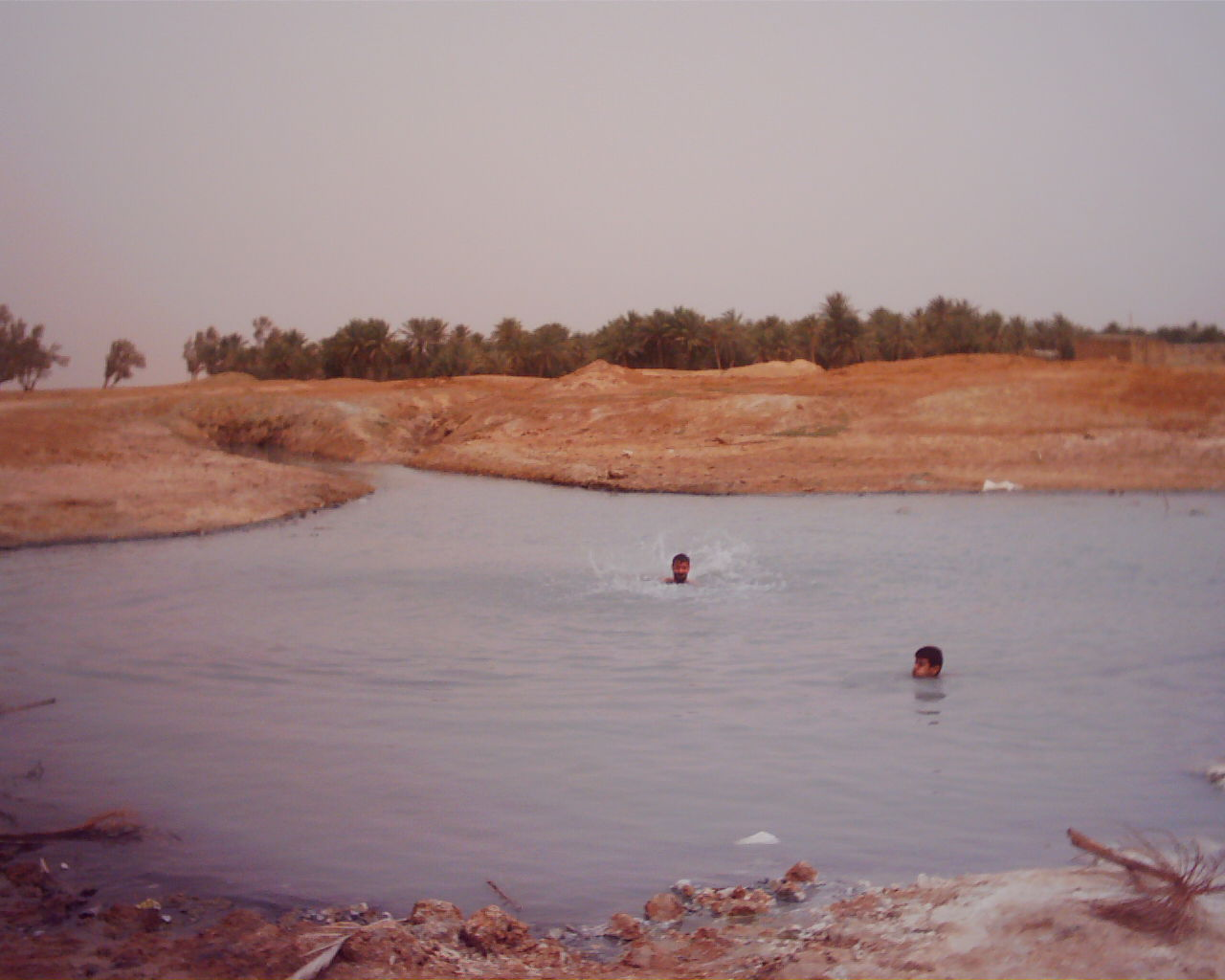
Kubaisa Oasis, 2003

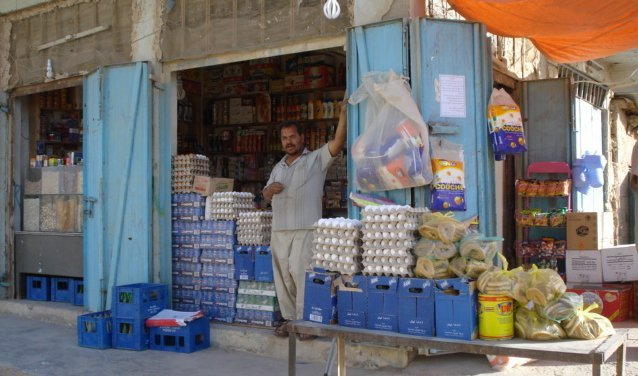
A shop in Hit, 2008

== Sources ==
- Le Strange, Guy (1905). The Lands of the Eastern Caliphate: Mesopotamia, Persia, and Central Asia, from the Moslem Conquest to the Time of Timur. Cambridge: Cambridge University Press. OCLC 458169031.
