= Fall of Fallujah =

Battle that took place from late 2013 to early 2014

- Part of the Anbar campaign (2013–2014), the War in Iraq (2013–2017) and the war on terror
Date	30 December 2013 – 4 January 2014 (5 days)
Location	Fallujah, Iraq 33.3667°N 43.7667°E
Result	Major ISIL victory, beginning of the War in Iraq (2013–2017)
Territorial changes	ISIL captures and takes control of Fallujah.

Belligerents
Islamic State of Iraq and the Levant: Military of ISIL General Military Council for Iraqi Revolutionaries Anbar Tribal Council	Republic of Iraq: Iraqi Armed Forces; Iraqi Police

Strength
200–300 fighters	10,000+ soldiers

Casualties and losses
50+ fighters killed	458+ soldiers killed or executed

The fall of Fallujah was a major battle in the city of Fallujah in western Iraq that took place from late 2013 to early 2014, in which Islamic State of Iraq and the Levant (ISIL) militants and other Sunni insurgents including Anbar tribal militias captured the city of Fallujah. It was one of the first Iraqi cities to fall out of the control of the Iraqi Government, and resulted in the Anbar campaign.

== Battle ==
On 30 December 2013, Iraqi forces dismantled a Sunni protest camp, which angered many people. Gunmen proceeded to attack deployed army patrols on the highway.

On 2 January 2014, ISIL militants seized control of parts of the town, as well as nearby Ramadi. After the army withdrew from the area, ISIL fighters and its tribal allies entered both cities. Many videos showed ISIL forces clashing with police forces, and ISIL attacks and seizures on the main police station. 100 inmates were freed, weapons and ammunition were seized, and most police forces abandoned their posts.

On January 3, Fallujah was reportedly under the control of ISIL jihadists, but Iraq said the city remained contested. The jihadists raised their black flag in Fallujah, took over all police stations, and military posts after security forces left the city, set police vehicles ablaze and brandished their weapons.

On January 4, the town was taken by ISIL jihadists and tribal fighters. The Iraqi army shelled the city with mortars in an attempt to wrestle back the town, but resulted in the deaths of 8 people and wounded 30, while 60% of the town was reported to be under militant control. Much later, Prime Minister Nouri al-Maliki vowed to eliminate "all terrorist groups" in a statement on national television. The police chief of the Anbar said that Iraqi forces were in control of the outskirts of Fallujah, but the city itself was held by ISIL and its allies. Sunni tribesmen refused to let Iraqi forces into the city, but held negotiations with them. Iraqi forces proceeded to shell the city from a nearby military base, before eventually withdrawing.

== Aftermath ==
Five months later, the War in Iraq of 2013 to 2017 escalated during ISIL's June 2014 offensive. Two years later, Iraqi government forces recaptured the city of Fallujah in 2016.

== See also ==
- Fall of Mosul
- Second Battle of Tikrit
- Anbar campaign (2015–2016)
- Battle of Ramadi (2014–2015)
- Battle of Ramadi (2015–2016)
- List of wars and battles involving the Islamic State
