= Timeline of the War in Iraq (2014) =

The Military situation in (February 6, 2026 - 27 November 2024) Controlled by Syrian opposition Controlled by Syrian government Controlled by Iraqi government Controlled by the Islamic State in Iraq and Syria (ISIS) Controlled by Syrian Kurds Controlled by Iraqi Kurds

The Timeline of the War in Iraq covers the War in Iraq, a war which erupted that lasted in Iraq from 2013 to 2017, during the first year of armed conflict.

== Chronology ==
=== January ===
- Fall of Fallujah and Battle of Ramadi (2013–2014): ISIL militants were in control of more than half of the Iraqi city of Fallujah and parts of Ramadi. Tribesmen held parts of the other half, according to an interior ministry official. A witness in the city west of Baghdad said that militants had set up checkpoints each manned by six to seven people in central and south Fallujah. "In Ramadi, it is similar – some areas are controlled by ISIL and other areas are controlled by" tribesmen, the interior ministry official said, referring to the Al Anbar Governorate capital, which lies farther to the west. A journalist in Ramadi saw dozens of trucks carrying heavily armed men driving in the city's east, playing songs praising ISIL. Clashes broke out in the Ramadi area as security forces tore down the country's main Sunni Arab anti-government protest site, and continued for two more days. On Wednesday, militants in the city sporadically clashed with security forces and torched four police stations, but the clashes had subsided by Thursday, the Agence France-Presse journalist said. The violence also spread to Fallujah, where police abandoned most of their positions on Wednesday and militants burned some police stations.

Minister of the Interior Nouri al-Maliki said that Iraqi soldiers would depart restive cities in Anbar Province, but reversed that decision the following day. Army forces on Thursday remained outside Ramadi.

- ISIL militants advanced into gained ground and took over several police stations in Fallujah. In early morning, ISIS fighters advanced into areas in central Ramadi and deployed snipers on one street. A police colonel said the army had re-entered into areas of Fallujah, between Ramadi and Baghdad, but that around a quarter of it remained under ISIL control. Soldiers and armed tribesmen held the rest and had also surrounded the city, he said.

However, another senior officer, a police lieutenant colonel, said that while soldiers had deployed around the city they had yet to enter Fallujah.

- Iraqi government lost control of the city of Fallujah to ISIL militants, a senior security official in Al Anbar Governorate said. Fallujah is under the control of ISIL. Earlier on Friday, more than 100 people were killed as Iraqi police and tribesmen battled Al-Qaeda–linked militants who took over parts of two cities in Anbar, declaring Fallujah an Islamic state.

On the same day, the Iraqi Army shelled the western city of Fallujah with mortar bombs overnight to try to wrest back control from Sunni Muslim militants and tribesmen, killing at least eight people. Fallujah has been held since by militants linked to Al-Qaeda and by tribal fighters united in their opposition to Prime Minister Nouri al-Maliki, in a serious challenge to the authority of his Shi'ite-led government in Anbar province. Medical sources in Fallujah said another 30 people were wounded in shelling by the army.

- At least 20 people killing in new wave of bombings which hit on the Iraq's capital, Baghdad.
- Iraqi missile strikes on Ramadi killed 25 militants. Also in same day, unidentified gunmen killed seven police officers, including a captain, in an attack at a security checkpoint north of the Iraqi capital Baghdad. The deadly incident took place on a highway north of the city of Samarra.

No group claimed responsibility for the attack, but police officials say the main suspects are militants linked to Al-Qaeda.

- Gunmen attacked a military site north of the Iraqi capital, killing 12 soldiers and wounding four. The militants stormed a building at the site in the Al-Adhim area, then bombed it. Militants opposed to the Iraqi government frequently target members of the security forces with bombings and shootings.
- A suicide bomber killed 23 Iraqi Army recruits and wounded 36 in Baghdad on Thursday, officials said, in an attack on men volunteering to join the government's struggle to crush Al-Qaeda–linked militants in Anbar province. Brigadier General Saad Maan, spokesman for the Baghdad Security Operations Centre, said the bomber blew himself up among the recruits at the small Muthenna Airbase, used by the army in the capital. Maan put the death toll at 22 but health ministry officials said morgue records showed 23 had died.

No group immediately claimed responsibility for the attack, which occurred a day after Prime Minister Nouri al-Maliki said he would eradicate the "evil" of al Qaeda and its allies.

- A car bomb exploded outside a bus station in central Baghdad, killing at least nine people and wounding 16. No group immediately claimed responsibility for attack on bus terminal Alawi al-Hilla. Also on Sunday, bombing targeting a general in northern Iraq outside his home in eastern Sulaimaniyah, damaged his vehicle but left him unharmed.
- Four car bombs killed at least 25 people in Shi'ite Muslim districts of Baghdad, in violence that coincided with a visit to the Iraqi capital by U.N. Secretary-General Ban Ki-moon. Although no group claimed responsibility, the bombings appeared to be part of a relentless campaign by al Qaeda linked Sunni Muslim militants to undermine Prime Minister Nouri al-Maliki's Shi'ite-led government.
- Bombings and shootings killed at least eight people in and around the Iraqi capital, including a judge. Gunmen in a speeding car opened fire at the judge, killing him and his driver. Later in the afternoon a sticky bomb attached to a mini-bus exploded in the Shiite neighborhood of Sadr City, killing three passengers and wounding eight.
- Bomb attacks and shootings killed at least 75 people in Iraq, police and hospital sources said, making it one of the bloodiest days in months, but troops reclaimed a town west of Baghdad.
- The bodies of 14 Sunni Muslim tribesmen were found in date palm groves north of Baghdad, a day after they were kidnapped by uniformed men in security forces vehicles. The victims, all from the Albu Rawdas tribe, had been abducted while they were attending a funeral in the town of Tarmiya, 25 km (16 miles) north of the Iraqi capital.
- Five bombings in Baghdad, including an attack on a glitzy new shopping mall in the west of the capital, killed 14 people and wounded several others. The blasts struck in the neighbourhoods of Mansur, Nahda, Taubchi, Sarafiyah and Amriyah—all across the capital.
- Seven bomb explosions killed 26 people and wounded 67 in the Iraqi capital, as security forces battled Sunni Muslim militants around the western cities of Fallujah and Ramadi.

No group claimed responsibility for the blasts. On same day, a senior Iraqi official claims ISIL fighters hunkered down in a city they seized late last month west of Baghdad have enough heavy weapons to allegedly take the country's capital.

- Two soldiers and three would-be suicide bombers were killed and 18 other soldiers wounded in separate violent attacks in eastern and central Iraq. On the same day, security forces thwarted coordinated predawn attacks by ISIL militants in eastern Diyala Governorate when the troops came under arms fire near the provincial capital city of Baqubah, some 65 km northeast of Baghdad, prompting a fierce clash with the attackers, killing three of them and seized three of their explosive vests.
- Iraqi Armed Forces in Al Anbar Governorate killed scores of ISIL militants as the army continues its fight against terrorists. According to Iraqi Defense Ministry, the air forces carried airstrikes to bases Takfiri militants in western Anbar province and killing scores militants.
- January 25 – Three mortar shells landed in the village mainly populated by Shia Muslims near the Iraqi city of Baqubah killed six people. On the same day, double bombing has killed a soldier and his entire family in their home in town Muqdadiyah in 90 kilometers (60 miles) north of Baghdad.
- At least four people were killed and 14 wounded in the afternoon when almost simultaneously three car bombs detonated in northern Iraq, in city Kirkuk, some 250 km north of Baghdad. On the same day, head of a city council and two of councillors were killed by gunmen who attacked their convoy near the town of Wajihiyah in eastern Diyala Governorate also in al-Rashdiyah northern suburb Baghdad, gunmen killed an ex-officer of Saddam Hussein's army and his wife.
- Seven members of Iraq's security forces killed on during an armed attack north of Baghdad, the latest in a surge in violence fuelling fears the country is slipping back into all-out conflict.
- At least 13 people were killed and 39 others wounded in violent attacks in the Iraqi capital of Baghdad. According to UNAMI in Iraq in 2013 were killed a total of 8,868 Iraqis, including 7,818 civilians and civilian police personnel.
- Security officials said militants stormed an office of Ministry of Human Rights (Iraq) in northeast Baghdad and took a number of civil servants hostage. The attack was mounted by eight armed men. Later, security forces kill to all attackers and free hostages.

=== February ===
- During the first month of war (January), in terrorist attacks and other violence across Iraq, 1,013 people, including 795 civilians, 122 soldiers and 96 policemen, were killed during some form of violence.
- At least 20 people were killed and 68 others wounded in violent attacks in and around the Iraqi capital of Baghdad. The deadliest attack occurred in the area of Abu Dusher in southern Baghdad when two car bombs exploded, leaving four people killed and 16 others wounded.
- At least 16 people were killed in a string of bombings in the Iraqi capital, Baghdad. On the same day, Iraqi officials said up to 32 people were also killed during two more attacks in crowded places in Baghdad.
- Iraqi officials said at least nine people were killed and 22 were wounded in a string of car bombings that hit commercial areas in the Baghdad's eastern neighborhood of Jamila and northern neighborhood of Kazimiyah.
- Attacks in Baghdad and north of the capital killed nine people, including a supporter of powerful Shiite cleric Moqtada al-Sadr, who was standing in parliamentary elections to be held in April. On the same day, another five were also killed and dozens more injured in Tuz Khurmatu, east of Tikrit in Saladin Governorate.
- At least 19 people were killed and 19 wounded in violent attacks across Iraq. Attacks occurred at a marketplace in the Shiite district of Sadr City in the eastern part of the Iraqi capital of Baghdad, as well as in the town of Mahmoudiyah, some 30 km south of Baghdad. Violence also claimed lives in the southwestern part of city of Baqubah, capital of Diyala Governorate.
- At least 22 insurgents, including a suicide bomber were killed and 15 injured when a car bomb mistakenly went off in a militant compound north of Baghdad.
- 15 soldiers were killed in a pre-dawn assault on an army camp guarding an oil pipeline near Hamam al-Alil in the north of Nineveh Governorate, one of the most violent parts of Iraq.
- At least 17 civilians, including soldiers, were killed across Iraq by car bombs and roadside explosives.

No terrorist groups claimed responsibility for these attacks.

- Talib Hameed Mustafa, mayor of the city Sulaiman Bek, reported that gunmen seized the town, some 90 km east of Tikrit after clashes with security forces.
- Talib Mohammed mayor of the city Sulaiman Bek said, that Iraqi troops backed by helicopter gunships regained ground in the northern town of Sulaiman Bek, a day after parts of it were overrun by ISIL militants. At least 12 ISIL militants were killed by the army.
- 17 soldiers and policemen were killed and 12 others wounded in separate attacks targeting the security forces across Iraq.
- At least 13 people were killed and 65 injured in consequence of the explosion of seven car bombs in central Iraq.
- 16 people were killed and 32 others wounded in separate violent attacks, mainly targeting Iraqi security forces across the country.
- At least 20 people were killed and 35 wounded in Iraq when three mortar rounds struck a crowded market in a mainly Shi'ite Muslim town of Mussayab, 60 km south of the Baghdad.
- 21 people were killed and 26 others wounded in violent attacks across Iraq.
- February 27 – At least 42 people were killed as a motorcycle rigged with explosives detonated in Baghdad's Sadr City and militants targeted mostly Shi'ite neighbourhoods around the country.

=== March ===
- March 1 – The UNAMI said a total of 703 people were killed in Iraq in February. The figure excluded deaths from the ongoing fighting between the Iraqi forces and ISIL militants in the western Al Anbar Governorate. Some 564 civilians and 139 members of security forces were killed in the violence in the country, while 1,381 people, including 1,179 civilians, were injured.
- March 5 – Up to 26 people were killed and 87 others wounded in violent attacks across Iraq, including a series of car bombs in Baghdad.
- March 6 – At least 37 civilians killed in the series of bombings on commercial areas in central Iraq.
- March 9 – At least 50 people killed and more than 150 wounded on the suicide bombing at a crowded checkpoint south of the city Baghdad.
- March 18 – At least 18 people were killed and 24 others wounded in separate attacks across Iraq.
- March 19 – At least 37 people killed and 40 people injured due to outbreaks of violence across Iraq, including shelling and clashes in a militant-held city on Baghdad's doorstep.
- March 21 – The militants seized a village Sarha in north of Iraq and also 27 people killing including at least 10 policemen and more than 50 injured in consequence of attacks nationwide.
- March 25 – More than 80 people were killed in a series of attacks in Iraq, with the heaviest death toll in the Baghdad area. At least 41 of the victims were Iraqi Army soldiers, who suffered a major ambush near Taji that killed 22 and injured 15 others. An earlier suicide bombing near the city killed another 5 soldiers and wounded 14 others, while an attack on a base in Tarmiyah killed 8 soldiers and injured 14 others.
- March 27 – Iraqi authorities say that 19 people were killed and 52 wounded in bombings targeting a commercial street and a market have in the same neighborhood northern Baghdad.

=== April ===
- 2 April, at least 25 people were killed and 23 wounded in separate attacks mainly targeting soldiers of the Iraqi security forces across Iraq.
- 3 April, the Interior Ministry's spokesman Saad Maan Ibrahim said that more than 40 ISIS militants and one officer of Iraqi security forces died in clashes near Baghdad. Later more five people dead and seventeen injured elsewhere in the country in consequence the attacks.
- 5 April, at least 18 soldiers killed in an explosion and ensuing gunfight at booby-trapped house near the city of Fallujah.
- 8 April, at least 15 people dead in attacks in Iraq while security forces said they killed 25 militants near Baghdad amid worries insurgents are encroaching on the capital weeks ahead of elections.
- 9 April, at least 24 people were killed and 48 wounded in a series of car bombs has hit several mostly Shiite neighborhoods in Baghdad.
- 10 April, at least 25 people were killed and 31 others wounded in separate violent attacks across Iraq.
- 12 April, at least 21 people were killed and 45 others wounded in separate violent attacks across Iraq.
- 13 April, at least 36 people were killed and 28 others wounded in separate violent attacks across Iraq.
- 16 April, at least 36 people were killed and 53 others wounded in separate attacks across Iraq.
- 17 April, at least 30 people, including Iraqi soldiers, have been killed and dozens more injured in consequence separate terrorist attacks across Iraq.
- 19 April, at least 69 people were killed about half of them were militants and 73 civilians and security personnel were wounded in during ongoing violence across Iraq.
- 20 April, at least 79 people were killed and 112 more were wounded in during ongoing violence across Iraq.
- 21 April, 33 people were killed and some 50 others wounded in separate attacks, including two suicide bombings across Iraq.
- 23 April, militants wearing military uniforms carried out an overnight attack against a balloting centre in a remote area of the country's north and killed 10 guards.
- 26 April, at least 31 people were killed and 56 others wounded in two car bomb attacks at a parliamentary election rally in Baghdad.
- 27 April, a bombing by the Iraqi Air Force of a fuel-tanker convoy on the Syrian–Iraqi border took place when the convoy attempted to penetrate Iraq's border from Syria. According to the Brigadier General Saad Maan, an interior ministry spokesman, "The army struck eight tanker trucks in Wadi Suwab inside Syrian territory as they were trying to enter Iraqi territory to provide the (jihadist) Islamic State of Iraq and the Levant (ISIL) with fuel." Eight militants were killed in the incident.
- 28 April, nearly 60 people including 27 members of the Iraqi security forces were killed and 50 others injured in a series of bomb attacks across Iraq while as the country prepared for parliamentary elections.
- 29 April, a total of 35 people were killed and 69 others wounded in separate attacks across Iraq.

=== May ===
- 4 May, officials said that more than 30 people killed within 24 hours in consequence violence in Iraq, including shelling in a militant-held city and an attack targeting Shiite pilgrims.
- 6 May, 24 people were killed and 29 wounded in separate violent incidents across of Iraq.
- 11 May, a total of 41 people were killed, including 20 soldiers the Iraqi Army and 30 people injured across Iraq in separate insurgent attacks that mainly targeted security forces.
- 16 May, at least 29 people killed and dozens wounded during bombings and shootings around Iraq's capital, including an attack involving militants using a fake checkpoint to kill army officers.
- 28 May, over 60 people were killed and scores of others injured across Iraq.
- 29 May, at least 74 people were killed and 52 injured in a series of attacks across Iraq, including the capital, Baghdad.

=== June ===
- In early June, following its large-scale offensives in Iraq, ISIL was reported to have seized control of most of Mosul, the second most populous city in Iraq, a large part of the surrounding Nineveh Governorate, and the city of Fallujah. ISIS also took control of Tikrit, the administrative center of Saladin Governorate, with the ultimate goal of capturing Baghdad, the Iraqi capital. ISIS was believed to have only 2,000–3,000 fighters up until the Mosul campaign, but during that campaign, it became evident that this number was a gross underestimate.
- Also in June, there were reports that a number of Sunni groups in Iraq that were opposed to the predominantly Shia government had joined ISIL, thus bolstering the group's numbers. However, the Kurds—who are mostly Sunnis—in the northeast of Iraq, were unwilling to be drawn into the conflict, and there were clashes in the area between ISIL and the Kurdish Peshmerga.
- 5 June: ISIL militants stormed the city of Samarra, Iraq, before being ousted from the city by airstrikes mounted by the Iraqi military.
- 6 June: ISIL militants carried out multiple attacks in the city of Mosul, Iraq.
- 7 June: ISIL militants took over the University of Anbar in Ramadi, Iraq and held 1,300 students hostage, before being ousted by the Iraqi military.
- 9 June: Mosul fell to ISIL control. The militants seized control of government offices, the airport, and police stations. Militants also looted the Central Bank in Mosul, reportedly absconding with US$429 million. More than 500,000 people fled Mosul to escape ISIS. Mosul is a strategic city as it is at a crossroad between Syria and Iraq, and posed the threat of ISIL seizing control of oil production.
- 11 June: ISIL seized the Turkish consulate in the Iraqi city of Mosul, and kidnapped the head of the diplomatic mission and several staff members. ISIL seized the Iraqi city of Tikrit.
- 12 June: Human Rights Watch, an international human rights advocacy organization, issued a statement about the growing threat to civilians in Iraq.
- 13 June: Navi Pillay, UN High Commissioner for Human Rights, expressed alarm at reports that ISIL fighters "have been actively seeking out—and in some cases killing—soldiers, police and others, including civilians, whom they perceive as being associated with the government."

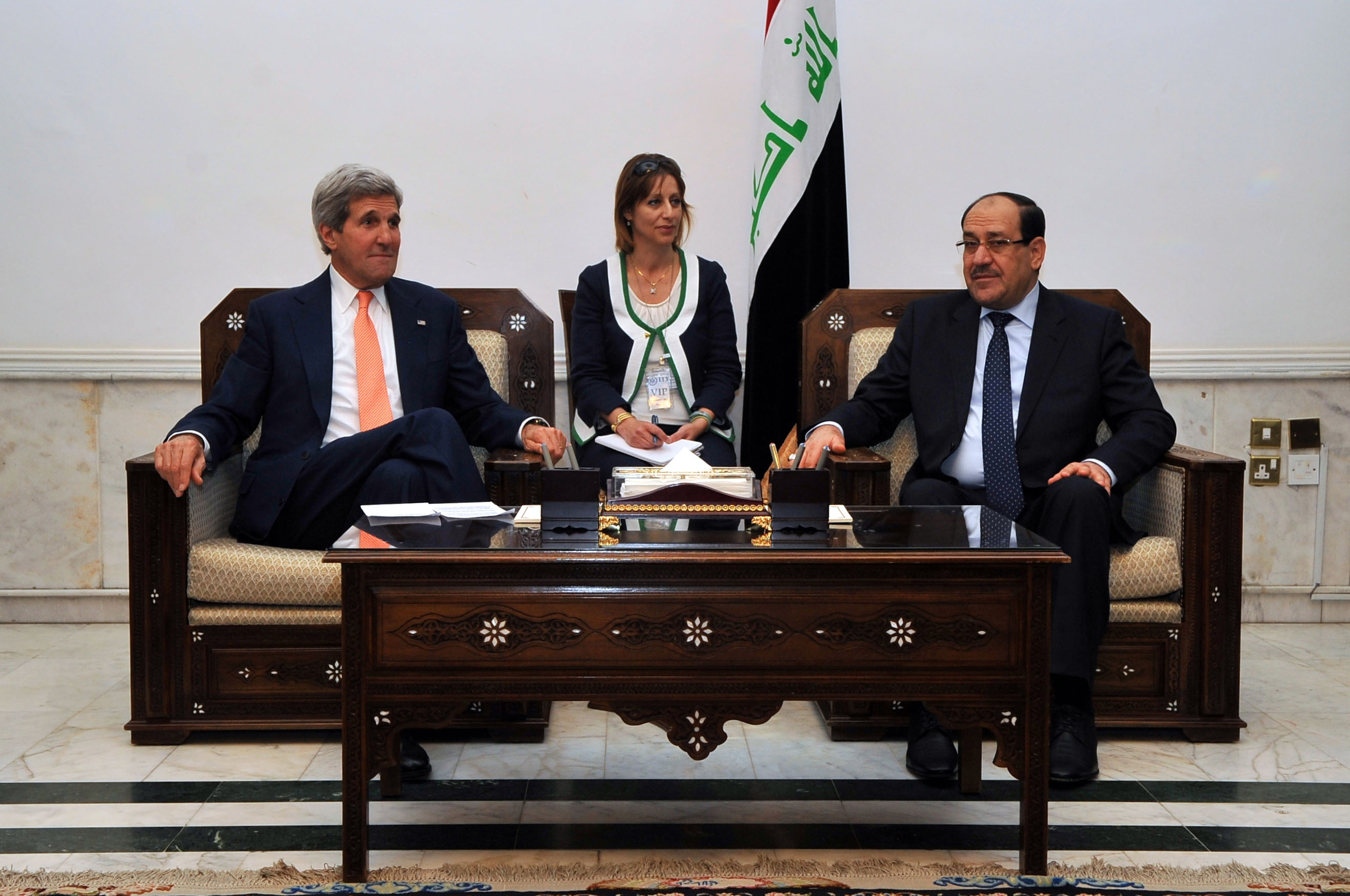
US Secretary of State John Kerry and Iraqi Prime Minister Nouri al-Maliki in Baghdad on 23 June 2014

- 15 June: ISIL militants captured the Iraqi city of Tal Afar, in the province of Nineveh. ISIL claimed that 1,700 Iraqi soldiers who had surrendered in the fighting had been killed, and released many images of mass executions via its Twitter feed and various websites.
- 22 June: ISIL militants captured two key crossings in Anbar, a day after seizing the border crossing at Al-Qaim, a town in a province which borders Syria. According to analysts, capturing these crossings could aid ISIL in transporting weapons and equipment to different battlefields.
- 24 June: The Syrian Air Force bombed ISIL positions in Iraq. Iraqi Prime Minister Nouri al-Maliki stated: "There was no coordination involved, but we welcome this action. We welcome any Syrian strike against Isis because this group targets both Iraq and Syria."
- 25 June: The al-Nusra Front's branch in the Syrian town of Abu Kamal pledged loyalty to ISIL, thus bringing months of fighting between the two groups to a close.
- 25 June: In an interview with the BBC Arabic service, Prime Minister Nouri al-Maliki said that Iraq had purchased used Sukhoi fighter jets from Russia and Belarus to battle ISIL militants, after delays in the delivery of F-16 fighters purchased from the US. "[If] we had air cover, we would have averted what happened", he said.
- 26 June: Iraq launched its first counterattack against ISIL's advance with an airborne assault designed to seize back control of Tikrit University.
- 28 June: The Jerusalem Post reported that the Obama administration had requested US$500 million from the US Congress to use in the training and arming of "moderate" Syrian rebels fighting against the Syrian government, in order to counter the growing threat posed by ISIL in Syria and Iraq.
- 29 June: ISIL announced the establishment of a new caliphate. Abu Bakr al-Baghdadi was appointed its caliph, and the group formally changed its name to the Islamic State.

=== July ===
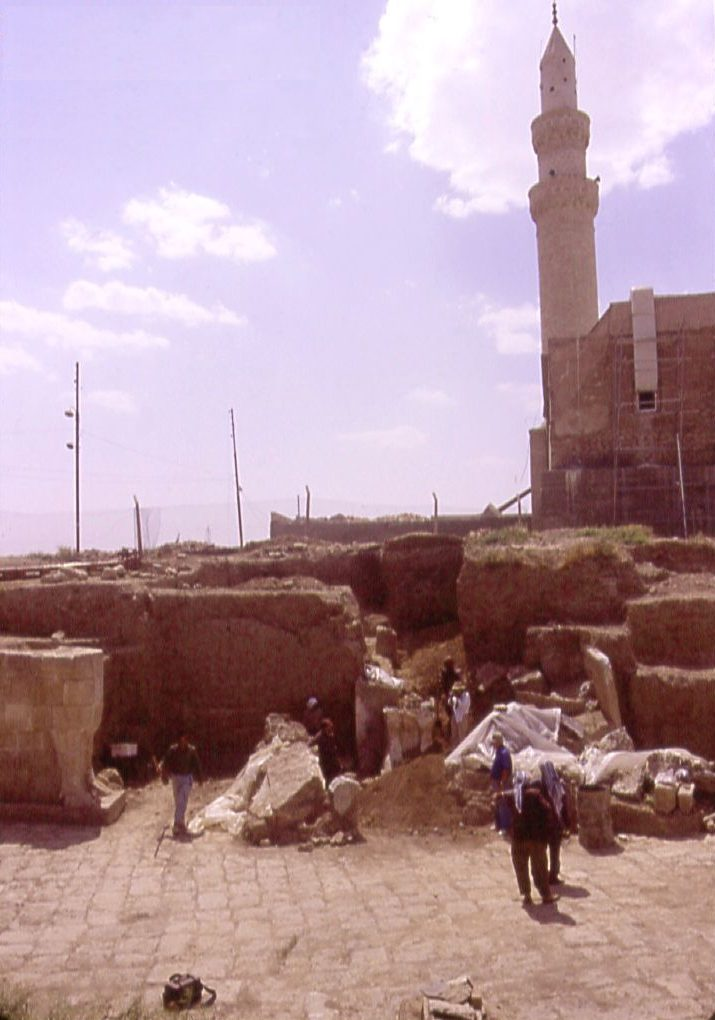
Prophet Yunus Mosque before being destroyed.

- 2 July: Abu Bakr al-Baghdadi, the self-proclaimed caliph of the new Islamic State, said that Muslims should unite to capture Rome in order to "own the world." He called on Muslims the world over to unite behind him as their leader.
- 19 July: ISIL claimed responsibility for a suicide bombing, which killed 33 people and left more than 50 wounded. The explosion occurred in Baghdad's Kadhimiya district, which is the site of a major Shia shrine.
- 24 July: ISIL blew up the Mosque and tomb of the Prophet Yunus (Jonah) in Mosul, with no reported casualties. Residents in the area said that ISIL had erased a piece of Iraqi heritage. Johah's tomb was also an important holy site in the Jewish heritage as well.
- 26 July: ISIL blew up the Nabi Shiyt (Prophet Seth) shrine in Mosul. Sami al-Massoudi, deputy head of the Shia endowment agency which oversees holy sites, confirmed the destruction and added that ISIL had taken artifacts from the shrine to an unknown location.
- 28 July: To mark the Muslim holy festival of Eid al-Fitr, which ends the period of Ramadan, ISIL released and circulated a 30-minute video showing graphic scenes of mass executions.
- The UN reported that of the 1,737 fatal casualties of the Iraq conflict during July, 1,186 were civilians.

=== August ===
U.S. F/A-18 fighters bomb Islamic State artillery targets on August 8

- 1 August: The Indonesian BNPT declared ISIS a terrorist organization.
- 2 August: The Iraqi Army confirmed that 37 loyalist fighters had died during combat with Islamic State militants south of Baghdad, and in Mosul. The Patriotic Union of Kurdistan (PUK) claimed that "hundreds" of IS militiamen had died in the action.
- 2 August: ISIS and its al-Nusra Front allies invade Lebanon in and around the town of Arsal, sparking a five-day battle between them and the Lebanese army, who push ISIS back across the border into Syria. Over a hundred fighters were killed, and scores of civilians were killed or wounded.
- 3 August: IS fighters occupied the city of Zumar and an oilfield in the north of Iraq, after a battle against Kurdish forces.
- 5 August: Al Jazeera reported that an IS offensive in the Sinjar area of northern Iraq had forced 30,000–50,000 Yazidis to flee into the mountains, fearing they would be killed by the IS. They had been threatened with death if they refused conversion to Islam. A UN representative said that "a humanitarian tragedy is unfolding in Sinjar."
- 6 August: The Islamic State kidnapped 400 Yazidi women in Sinjar to sell them as sex slaves.

U.S. President Barack Obama delivers an update on the situation and U.S. position on Iraq, authorizing airstrikes against ISIL and humanitarian aid for religious minorities trapped on a mountain.

- 7 August: IS fighters took control of the town of Qaraqosh in the province of Nineveh in northern Iraq, which forced its large Christian population to flee. President Obama authorized targeted airstrikes in Iraq against ISIL, along with airdrops of aid. The UK offered the US assistance with surveillance and refuelling, and planned humanitarian airdrops to Iraqi refugees.
- 8 August: The US asserted that the systematic destruction of the Yazidi people by the Islamic State was genocide. The US military launched indefinite airstrikes targeting Islamic State fighters, equipment and installations, with humanitarian aid support from the UK and France, in order to protect civilians in northern Iraq. The Islamic State had advanced to within 30 km of Erbil in northern Iraq. The UK is also considering joining the US in airstrikes.
- 10 August: France's Foreign Minister Laurent Fabius said that Iraq's Kurds must be equipped to fight against ISIL and indicated that France would consider providing arms aid "in liaison with the Europeans". Islamic State militants buried an unknown number of Yazidi women and children alive, in an attack that killed 500 people, in what has been described as ongoing genocide in northern Iraq.
- 11 August: The Arab League accused the Islamic State of committing crimes against humanity. The UK decided not to join the US in airstrikes and instead stepped up its humanitarian aid to refugees.
- 12 August: The parents of kidnapped American journalist James Foley received an email from his captors. The US announced that it would not extend its airstrikes against the Islamic State to areas outside northern Iraq, emphasizing that the objective of the airstrikes was to protect US diplomats in Erbil. The US and the UK airdropped 60,000 litres of water and 75,000 meals for stranded refugees. The Vatican called on religious leaders of all denominations, particularly Muslim leaders, to unite and condemn the IS for what it described as "heinous crimes" and the use of religion to justify them.

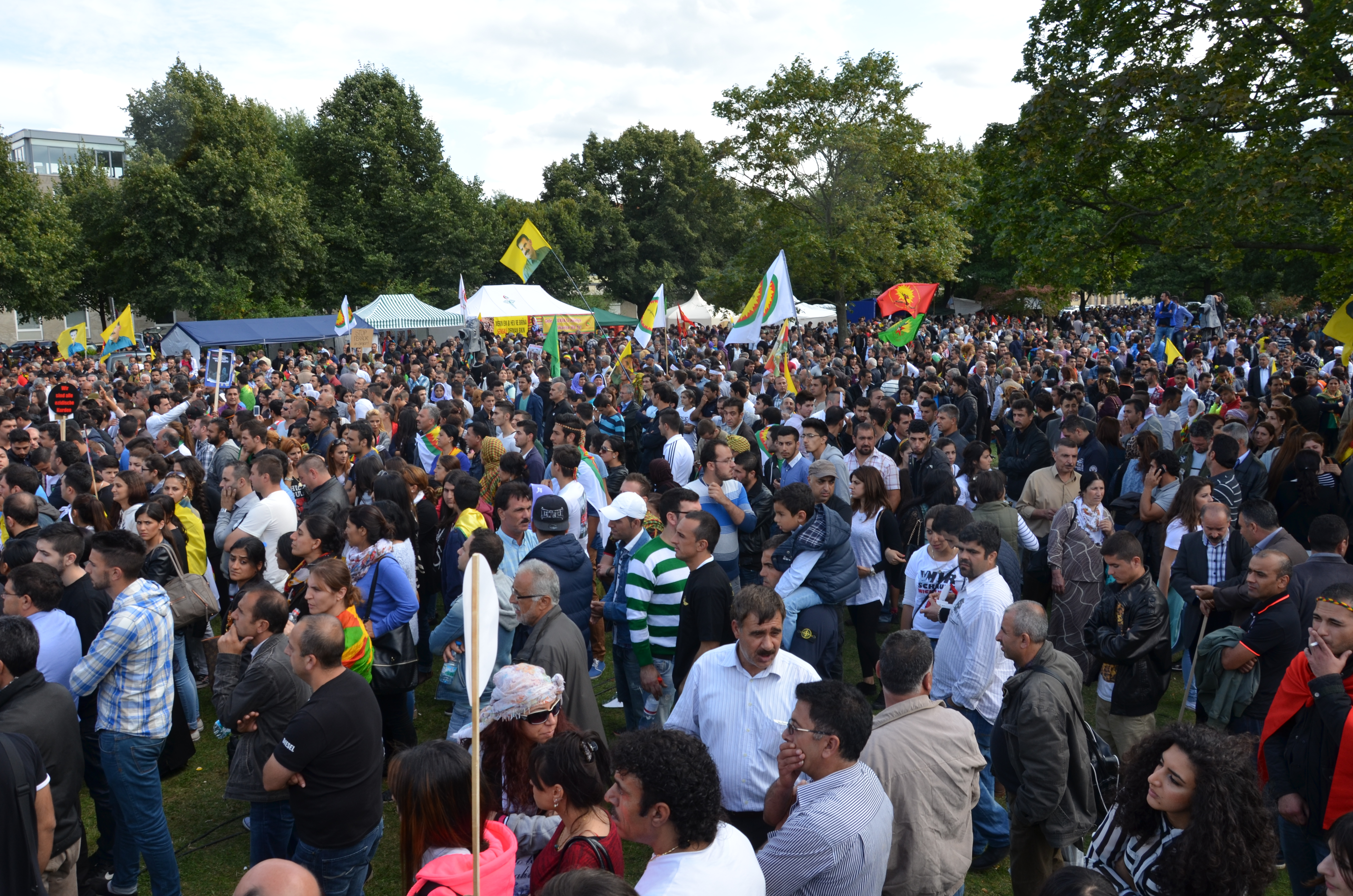
More than 10,000 Kurds in Hanover protest against the terror of ISIS in Iraq, 16 August 2014

- 14 August: Prime Minister Nouri al-Maliki announces his resignation. His designated successor is Haider al-Abadi.
- 15 August: The United Nations Security Council issued a resolution which "deplores and condemns in the strongest terms the terrorist acts of ISIL (Islamic State) and its violent extremist ideology, and its continued gross, systematic and widespread abuses of human rights and violations of international humanitarian law."
- 16 August: The Islamic State massacred 80 Yazidis. The EU agreed to supply Kurdish forces with arms, and US military forces continued to attack Islamic State fighters in the area around Iraq's crucial Mosul Dam.
- 17 August: Peshmerga troops, aided by the US air campaign, began an offensive to take back the strategic Mosul Dam from the Islamic State, amid fears that the destruction of the dam might unleash a 65-foot wave of water that could engulf the northern city of Mosul, and even flood Baghdad.
- 18 August: Pope Francis, leader of the world's 1.2 billion Roman Catholics, said that the international community would be justified in stopping Islamist militants in Iraq. He also said that it should not be up to a single nation to decide how to intervene in the conflict. The Dutch send fighter jets to strike ISIL Iraq when needed.
- 19 August: According to the Syrian Observatory for Human Rights, the size of the Islamic State's forces had grown to more than 50,000 fighters in Syria. American journalist James Foley was beheaded by the Islamic State on video tape.
- 20 August: US President Obama denounced the "brutal murder of Jim Foley by the terrorist group ISIL."
- 21 August: The US military admitted that a covert rescue attempt involving dozens of US Special Operations forces had been made to rescue James Foley and other Americans held captive in Syria by Islamic State militants. The air and ground assault, involving the first known US military ground action inside Syria, had the authorization of President Barack Obama. The ensuing gunfight resulted in one US soldier being injured. The rescue was unsuccessful, as Foley and the other captives were not in the location targeted. This was the first known engagement by US ground forces with suspected Islamic State militants. US Defense Secretary warned that the Islamic State are tremendously well-funded, "they have no standard of decency, of responsible human behavior," and are an imminent threat to the US.
- 22 August: The US is considering airstrikes on ISIL in Syria, which would draw US military forces directly into the Syrian Civil War, as President Obama develops a long-term strategy to defeat the Islamic State.
- 23 August: Al Jazeera America reports that Iranian troops had crossed into Iraq and were fighting alongside the Peshmerga and Iraqi troops.
- 28 August: American drones select new target data on August 28
- 31 August: the United States, France, United Kingdom and Australia began humanitarian aid drops, like food, water and medical supplies, to help prevent a potential massacre against the Shi'a Turkmen minority in Amirli. The US also carried out air strikes on ISIL positions around and near Amirli. Iraqi officials stated that they had reached Amirli and broken the siege and that the military was fighting to clear the areas around the town. This is known to be the first major turning point against the ISIS in Iraq.

=== September ===
- 2 September: The United States sends an additional 250 US troops to protect American personnel.
- 3 September: A video is released by ISIL(S) on social media of a second American reporter being beheaded by a masked man, believed to be "Jihad John", the same man who beheaded American journalist James Foley; David Hawthorne Cains was also presented in the video and the masked man stated that if America and its allies do not stop and withdraw from Iraq, then the English hostage will be the 3rd person to be beheaded. Australia delivers a load of armaments to Kurdish forces in Northern Iraq, to help fight against ISIL(S).
- 7 September: The United States launches new airstrikes on ISIL(S) in western Iraq, in an effort to protect the Haditha Dam.
- 10 September: U.S. President Barack Obama authorises $25 million for "immediate military assistance" to the Iraqi government and Kurdistan Regional Government. He also outlines plans to expand US operations against ISIL(S) to Syria in a televised address to the nation. RSA Muslims condemn ISIS.
- 14 September: 400 Australian Air Force personnel, up to eight Super Hornet aircraft, an early warning and control aircraft and an aerial refuelling aircraft were also pledged on the 14th.
- 19 September: First French airstrikes occur. Belgian participation for one month was authorized by the country's Chamber of Representatives in the afternoon of September 19, after more than 3½ hours of debate. The Belgian military contingent was said to number 120, including eight pilots and an unknown amount of F-16 multirole fighters, to be based in Jordan, Defense Minister Pieter De Crem said.
- 22 September: Australian police call for calm after terrorist inspired 'Isis' graffiti attack in the city of Cairns on September 22.
- 23 September: A pair of U.S. Air Force F-15E Strike Eagles fly over northern Iraq after conducting airstrikes in northern Syria, in the morning of September 23, 2014. Reuters Cruise missiles hit Al Raqqar in Syria. A refinery, the GPO, power station and army recruit center were hit on September 23.
- 24 September: As a result of a United Nations General Assembly meeting, various nations have decided that they will provide military support against ISIS.
- 25 September: U.S. and Arab airstrikes target ISIL-held oil facilities in Syria and Iraq.
- 26 September: Large numbers staged protests in Europe and the United States in solidarity with the mostly Kurdish people of Kobane in Syria, coinciding with the first US airstrikes on the city’s outskirts on Saturday against Islamic State (IS or ISIS) forces. Sit-ins and protests took place on Friday and Saturday in cities in Germany, the Netherlands, Denmark, Britain, Austria and the United States. Danish Prime Minister Helle Thorning-Schmidt announced that Denmark would be deploying 250 pilots and staff, three reserve jets on the 26th. 4 combat jets were added later that day. Danish Prime Minister Helle Thorning-Schmidt announced that Denmark would be deploying 250 pilots and staff, three reserve F-16 fighter jets and four F-16 fighter jet combatant planes on the 27th
- 28 September: 6 Aussie F/A-18F Super Hornets, a E-7A Wedgetail and a KC-30A were sent in. An Airbus Voyager in flight refueling aircraft was also in used a second sortie over Northern Iraq on 28 September.
- 29 September: A mortar shells hit near the Turkey/Syria border crossing of Mursitpinar, close to a group of journalists and Turkish security forces, and another shell landed near a refugee camp, about one kilometer inside Turkey. Canada's parliament debates doing airstrikes in Iraq on September 29.
- 30 September: A British Panavia Tornado jet dropped a Paveway IV bomb on "a heavy weapon position" operated by ISIS in northwest Iraq, thus marking the first engagement of the British military against IS targets. 2 RAF Tornados used a Paveway IV bomb to blow up an ISIS truck in northern Iraq. Australia offers 200 special forces to the Kurds on September 30 600 Aussie troops land in the UAE on Sept 14th

=== October ===
- 1 October: America sends Apache helicopters and crews to Iraq.
- 2 October: The Russian news agency RT reported on 2 October that some British jihadists had threatened an "imminent" terror attack to avenge UK airstrikes on ISIS in Iraq. The Times revealed that three deceased ISIL members from Britain were originally from Tower Hamlets' Bangladeshi district. A fourth British casualty, Ibrahim Kamara, was a 19-year-old student from Brighton. Canada joined the anti-ISIL air strikes on October 2. The six-month mission was planned to include CF-18 fighter jets and refueling and surveillance aircraft, but not ground troops.
- 3 October: The "Iraq III No!" anti-war activists rallied in Central London to protest against British airstrikes on Islamic State positions in Iraq on October 3. Australia authorized its special forces troops to go to Iraq as part of the anti-ISIL coalition that day, as well as authorizing airstrikes. The White House praised Australia over its decision to join airstrikes in Iraq and to send special forces military trainers to the country on October 3. PM Mr Abbott gives RAAF planned airstrikes the go-ahead. Australia's cabinet approved Australia's Super Hornets to start bombing raids against Islamic State extremists in the near future, supported by 400 RAAF personnel. The RAAF will deploy 6 Super Hornets, a Wedgetail surveillance aircraft and an in-flight refueller. About 200 special forces members will train and advise Iraqi forces, but are awaiting final legal approval before deploying. Any airraids are planned to support Iraq's government against ISIS. The PM of New Zealand and the PM of PNG offered political support to Australia.
- 4 October: Manchester's leading Muslims condemn the murder of British aid convoy volunteer Alan Henning. Naved Siddiqi of the Islamic Society of Britain, said there were "very clear distinctions" between the jihadists and ordinary Muslims on October 4. Islamic State also threatened to kill the American aid worker Peter Kassig that day, after releasing a video of murder of British hostage Alan Henning. The ISIS fighter says in the video: "Obama, you have started your aerial bombardment in [Al-] Sham. So it's only right we continue to strike the necks of your ."
- 14 October: ISIS forces capture the city of Hīt, after the 300-strong Iraqi Army garrison has abandoned and set afire its local base and supplies and about 180,000 civilians (including refugees of the previous Anbar offensive) have fled the area.
- 24 October: Operation Ashura is launched by Iraqi forces and Iranian-backed Shia militias, scoring a major victory and retaking the strategic town of Jurf al-Sakhar near Baghdad, and secured the way for millions of Shia pilgrims who are going to Karbala and Najaf in the Day of Ashura. Kurdish forces, meanwhile, recapture Zumar.

=== November ===
- On 7 November, Iraqi forces retake control of most part of the strategic city Baiji from the Islamic State. So now government troops hold more than 70 percent of the city—including neighborhoods in the south, east and north—and are battling to capture the rest.
- Fighting erupts in Ramadi, capital of Al Anbar Governorate, on November 21.
- Iraqi and Kurdish forces make gains in Diyala Governorate. Kurdish forces retake Jalawla, and government forces retake Saadiya.
- Kurdish Peshmerga forces retake 5 key villages in an area known as Gweir and Makhmour.

=== December ===
- On 17 December, Peshmerga forces launched the December 2014 Sinjar offensive from Zumar and managed to break the siege of Mount Sinjar, recapture more than 700 square kilometers of territory, close in on Tal Afar, clear areas north of Mount Sinjar, and push into the city of Sinjar. As of 27 December 2014, the offensive is ongoing.
- At December 19, 2014, Fox News confirms through Pentagon officials that the top leaders of ISIL was killed in a U.S. airstrikes, including a deputy to ISIL leader Abu Bakr al-Baghdadi.

== See also ==
- 2014 in Iraq
- Terrorist incidents in Iraq in 2014
- Timeline of ISIL-related events (2014)
- Timeline of the Iraq War (2015)
- Timeline of the Iraq War (2016)
- Timeline of the Iraq War (2017)
