= Hīt shooting =

Terrorist incident in Iraq

- Part of War in Iraq (2013–2017)
- Location of Al Anbar Governorate in Iraq
- Location: Hīt, Iraq
- Date: 30 October 2014
- Attack type: Shooting
- Weapon: Gun
- Deaths: 75
- Injuries: 0
- Perpetrator: Islamic State of Iraq and the Levant

The Hīt shooting occurred on 30 October 2014 when insurgents from the Islamic State of Iraq and the Levant (ISIL) killed at least 75 members of the Albu Nimr tribe in Hīt, a town in Al Anbar Governorate.

Earlier in October, the Fall of Hīt to ISIL had cut off the road leading to nearby Haditha.

== See also ==
- American-led intervention in Iraq (2014–present)
- Fall of Hīt (2014)
- List of terrorist incidents in July–December 2014
- List of terrorist incidents linked to ISIL
- List of mass car bombings
- Military intervention against ISIL
- Number of terrorist incidents by country
- Timeline of ISIL-related events (2014)
- List of Islamist terrorist attacks
- Timeline of the War in Iraq (2014)
- War on terror
