= Timeline of the Islamic State (2014) =

In early 2014, the jihadist group Islamic State of Iraq and the Levant (ISIL or ISIS) captured extensive territory in Western Iraq in the Anbar campaign, while counter-offensives against it were mounted in Syria. Raqqa in Syria became its headquarters. The Wall Street Journal estimated that eight million people lived under its control in the two countries.

In June the group proclaimed a "worldwide caliphate" and shortened its name to just "Islamic State" (IS).

== Timeline ==
=== January 2014 ===
- 3 January: ISIL proclaims itself as an Islamic state in Fallujah. After prolonged tensions, the newly formed Army of Mujahedeen, the Free Syrian Army and the Islamic Front launched offensives against ISIL in the Syrian provinces of Aleppo and Idlib. These groups, proclaiming a "second revolution", attacked ISIL in many village areas, attacking up to 80% of those in Idlib and 65% in Aleppo.
- 4 January: Fallujah was captured by ISIL after several days of fighting which left more than 100 dead. ISIL claimed responsibility for the car-bomb attack on 2 January that killed four people and wounded dozens in the Beirut suburb of Haret Hreik, a town that acts as headquarters to Hezbollah.
- 6 January: Syrian rebels managed to expel ISIL from the city of Raqqa, ISIL's largest stronghold and the capital of the Raqqa province.
- 8 January: Islamists of several Syrian rebel brigades expelled most ISIL forces from the city of Aleppo. However, ISIL reinforcements from Deir ez-Zor province managed to retake several neighbourhood of the city of Raqqa. By this date ISIL had captured Al-Karmah, Hīt, Khaldiyah, Haditha and Al Qaim and several smaller towns in Al Anbar Governorate, while fighting raged in Ramadi and Abu Ghraib. By mid-January ISIL fighters had retaken the entire city of Raqqa, while rebels expelled ISIL from the city of Aleppo and the villages west of it.
- 13 January: Fallujah Dam was taken by pro-government tribes. In the previous week ISIL militants had used the dam to flood area around the city with the waters of the Euphrates which also caused the lowering of water levels in the southern provinces.
- 16 January: The Iraqi Army and allied Sunni tribes recaptured Saqlawiyah from ISIL.
- 22 January: Over 50 ISIL militants were killed by Iraqi Air Force strikes in Al Anbar Governorate.
- 25 January: ISIL announced the creation of its new Lebanese arm, pledging to fight the Shiaa militant group Hezbollah in Lebanon.
- 29 January: Turkish aircraft near the border fired on an ISIL convoy inside Aleppo province in Syria, killing 11 ISIL fighters and one ISIL emir.
- 30 January: ISIL fired on border patrol soldiers in Turkey. The Turkish Army retaliated with Panter howitzers and destroyed the ISIL convoy. Iraqi forces and their tribal allies recaptured Albu Farraj and Al-Nasaf near Ramadi.
- In late January, Haji Bakr, ISIL's then second-in-command, was reported to have been assassinated by Syrian militants. Haji Bakr had previously been head of al-Qaeda's military council and a former military officer in Saddam Hussain's army. They were unaware that they had killed the strategic head of the group calling itself "Islamic State".

=== February 2014 ===
- 3 February: al-Qaeda's general command broke off its links with ISIL, reportedly to concentrate the Islamist effort on unseating President Bashar al-Assad.
- By mid-February, al-Nusra Front had joined the battle in support of rebel forces, and expelled ISIL forces from the Deir ez-Zor province in Syria.
- 19 February: An ISIL leader, Abd Khaliq Mahedi, surrendered to the Chairman of Sons of Iraq Council, due to disagreement with other ISIL leaders on the killing of Iraqi soldiers and bombing of civilian houses.
- 23 February: ISIL carried out a suicide attack in Aleppo, killing a commander of Ahrar ash-Sham (Abu Khalid al-Suri) and six other members of the group.
- 28 February: The pro-government Sunni tribal Sheikh and councilman, Fleih al-Osman, and six of his men were killed by a suicide bomber in Haditha.

=== March 2014 ===
- By March, ISIL forces had fully retreated from Syria's Idlib province after battles against the Syrian rebels.
- 4 March: ISIL retreated from the Turkey border town of Azaz and nearby villages, choosing instead to consolidate around Raqqa, in anticipation of an escalation of fighting with al-Nusra.
- 8 March: Iraqi Prime Minister Nouri al-Maliki accused Saudi Arabia and Qatar of openly funding ISIL.
- 15 March: The number of internally displaced persons in Al Anbar Governorate, especially from Fallujah and Ramadi, reached 300,000. The number of people recorded killed by this date was 336, with 1,562 more wounded.
- 16 March: Iraqi Security Forces recaptured Ramadi and parts of Fallujah.
- 20 March: In Niğde city in Turkey, three ethnic Albanian members of ISIL opened fire while hijacking a truck, killing one police officer and one gendarmerie officer and wounding five people. Shortly after their arrest, Polis Özel Harekat teams launched a series of operations against ISIL in Istanbul. Two Azerbaijanis were arrested.

=== April 2014 ===
- 16 April: ISIL is reported to have killed Abu Muhammad al Ansari, the Al-Nusra Front emir of Idlib province, Syria. The ISIL assassination team killed his wife, his 2 children, and both of his brothers, who were in his house.
- 27 April: Iraqi helicopters reportedly destroyed an ISIL convoy inside Syria. This may be the first time that Iraqi forces have struck outside their country since the Gulf War.

=== May 2014 ===
- 1 May: ISIL carried out a total of seven public killings in the city of Raqqa in northern Syria. Pictures that emerged from the city show how ISIL had been carrying out public crucifixions in areas under its control. In most of these crucifixions, the victims were shot first and their bodies were then displayed, but there were also reports of crucifixions preceding the victims being shot or decapitated.
- 9–18 May: The Iraqi Army retook 16 villages and towns around Fallujah.

=== June 2014 ===
- In early June, ISIL was reported to have seized control of most of Mosul, the second most populous city in Iraq, a large part of the surrounding Nineveh Governorate, and the city of Fallujah. ISIL also took control of Tikrit, the administrative centre of the Salah ad Din Governorate, with the ultimate goal of capturing Baghdad, the Iraqi capital. ISIL was believed to have only 2,000–3,000 fighters up until the Mosul campaign, but during that campaign, it became evident that this number was a gross underestimate.
- Also in June, there were reports that a number of Sunni groups in Iraq that were opposed to the predominantly Shia government had joined ISIL, thus bolstering the group's numbers. However, the Kurds—who are mostly Sunnis—were unwilling to be drawn into the conflict, and there were clashes in the area between ISIL and the Kurdish Peshmerga.
- 5 June: ISIL militants stormed the city of Samarra, Iraq, before being ousted by airstrikes mounted by the Iraqi military. According to army officials, 12 policemen, 80 ISIL militants and several civilians were killed. The Commander of the Nagshabandiya Movement, Khalil al-Hayeeti, was killed in a clash with government forces in Al Anbar Governorate. Abu Abdulrahman al-Bilawi, the chief of the general military council for the Iraqi provinces of the Islamic state, was killed is Mosul by the Iraqi security forces.
- 6 June: ISIL militants carried out multiple attacks in the city of Mosul, Iraq.
- 7 June: ISIL militants took over the University of Anbar in Ramadi, Iraq, killed guards and held 1,300 students hostage, before being ousted by the Iraqi military.
- 8 June: An ISIL bombing in Jalula killed 18 members of the Kurdish security forces. ISIL forces captured Hawija, Zab, Riyadh, Abbasi, Rashad and Yankaja near Kirkuk.
- 9 June: Mosul fell to ISIL control. The militants seized control of government offices, the airport, and police stations. Militants also looted the Central Bank in Mosul, reportedly absconding with US$429 million. More than 500,000 people fled Mosul to escape ISIL, including 400 Christian families, nearly the entire Christian element of the population of Mosul. Mosul is a strategic city as it is at a crossroad between Syria and Iraq, and poses the threat of ISIL seizing control of oil production. At the same time, hundreds of Christian families fled from the Nineva Plains in face of the ISIL advance. 15 captured Iraqi soldiers were killed while captive by ISIL near Kirkuk.
- 10 June: ISIL killed 670 Shia inmates of Badush prison in Mosul. The 4th-century Mar Behnam Monastery was seized by ISIL, which forced its monks to leave without taking anything with them. Sixty UN staff were evacuated from Baghdad to Jordan.
- 11 June: ISIL seized the Turkish consulate in the Iraqi city of Mosul, and kidnapped the head of the diplomatic mission and several staff members. Baiji, Iraq was captured by ISIL forces, except for its surrounded oil refinery. Tikrit also fell to ISIL, which attacked Samarra as well, without succeeding in conquering it. 46 Indian nurses were stranded in Tikrit (they were released and flown back to India at the beginning of July)
- 12 June: ISIL captured ten towns in Saladin Governorate and routed an Iraqi Border Patrol battalion heading towards Sinjar with 60 trucks. Some of the 4,000–11,000 cadets and soldiers who had been ordered to leave Camp Speicher base were captured by ISIL; of these 1,095–1,700 were killed over the next three days. Human Rights Watch issued a statement about the growing threat to civilians in Iraq. Twelve imams were killed in Mosul for refusing to swear loyalty to ISIL. The imam of the Grand Mosque of Mosul, Muhammad al-Mansuri, was killed for the same reason. ISIL laid siege to the town of Amirli, where 13,000 Turkmen civilians were trapped.
- 13 June: ISIL captured two towns in Diyala Governorate and several villages around the Hamrin Mountains. Navi Pillay, UN High Commissioner for Human Rights, expressed alarm at reports that ISIL fighters "have been actively seeking out and killing soldiers, police and civilians, whom they perceive as being associated with the government". Kurdish Peshmerga forces occupied the city of Kirkuk, abandoned by the retreating Iraqi Army in face of the ISIL offensive. Kurdish forces also secured Jalula after it had been abandoned by Iraqi Army.
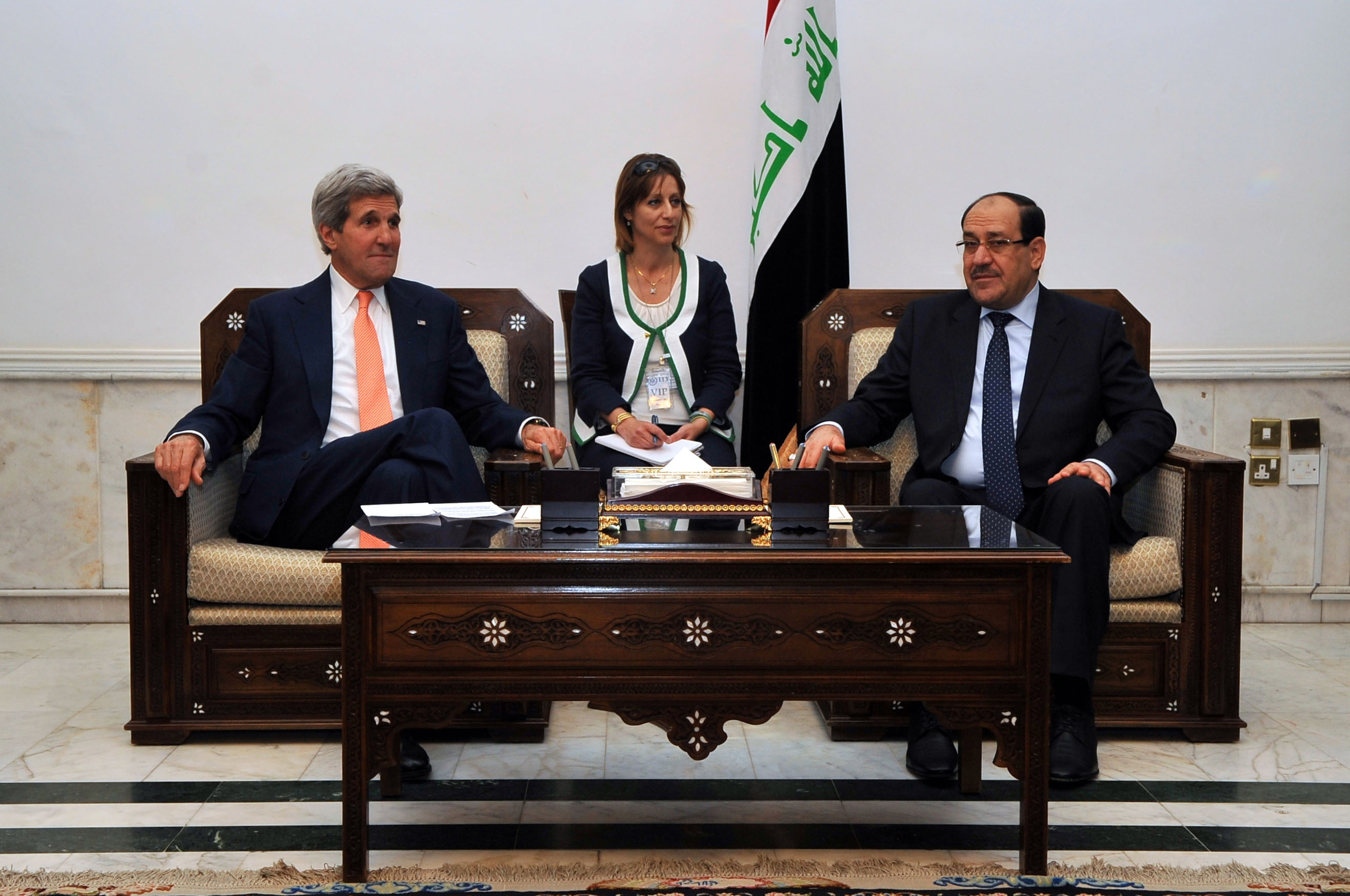
  US Secretary of State John Kerry and Iraqi Prime Minister Nouri al-Maliki in Baghdad on 23 June 2014
- 14 June: The Iraqi Army recaptured the town of Al-Mutasim near Samarra. The bodies of 128 Iraqi soldiers and policemen who had been killed in the battle of Mosul were retrieved.
- 15 June: ISIL militants captured the Iraqi city of Tal Afar, in the province of Nineveh, and its air base—18 ISIL militants, ten civilians and presumably a heavy number of defenders were killed—and also two villages in Adhaim. The Iraqi Air Force claimed to have killed 278 ISIL militants in airstrikes. Iraqi Army retook the town of Ishaqi, where the burned bodies of 12 policemen were found.
- 16 June: ISIL ambushed a convoy of Shia militia and killed 28–29 Shia volunteers near Samarra. ISIL also captured Saqlawiyah and shot down a helicopter. Iraqi police killed 44 Sunni prisoners before retreating from Baqubah.
- 17 June: The Iraqi Army recaptured the lost districts of Baqubah. Syrian rebels captured the Al-Qa'im border crossing from Iraqi forces. The bodies of 18 Iraqi soldiers, killed while captive, were found near Samarra.
- 18 June: ISIL captured three villages in Salaheddin province; 20 civilians were killed during the fighting.
- 19 June: ISIL captured the Al Muthanna Chemical Weapons Facility near Lake Tharthar.
- 21 June: After the agreed desertion of 400 Iraqi soldiers, ISIL captured Iraq's largest oil refinery in Baiji. Thousands of Shia militia members from all over Iraq rallied in a show of strength. Clashes between ISIL and allied Sunni militants left 17 dead in Hawija.
- 22 June: One day after seizing the border crossing at Al-Qaim, a town in a province which borders Syria, ISIL forces captured the towns of Rawa, Ana, Huseiba and Rutba. An entire Iraqi Security Forces brigade was reportedly destroyed in the battles raging in the area. Two more border crossings, one with Syria—Al-Waleed—and one with Jordan—Turaibil,— were taken by ISIL. During the fighting 21 leaders of Iraqi towns in the area were killed.
- 23 June: ISIL captured Tal Afar airport. Iraqi forces recaptured the Al-Waleed border crossing.
- 24 June: The Syrian Air Force bombed ISIL positions in Iraq for the first time. Iraqi Prime Minister Nouri al-Maliki stated: "There was no coordination involved, but we welcome this action. We welcome any Syrian strike against ISIS because this group targets both Iraq and Syria." Iraqi forces recaptured from ISIL the Turaibil border crossing.
- 25 June: Al-Nusra Front's branch in the Syrian town of Abu Kamal pledged loyalty to ISIL, thus bringing months of fighting between the two groups to a close. Syrian airstrikes and missile launches killed 50 and wounded 132 in Ar-Rutba.
- 25 June: Prime Minister Nouri al-Maliki said that Iraq had purchased used Sukhoi fighter jets from Russia and Belarus to battle ISIL militants, after delays in the delivery of F-16 fighters purchased from the US. "[If] we had air cover, we would have averted what happened," he said.
- 26 June: Iraq launched its first counterattack against ISIL, an airborne assault to seize back control of Tikrit University. ISIL captured the town of Mansouriyat al-Jabal with its four natural gas fields.
- 27 June: The Iraqi Army reconquered Al-Alam and Mansouriyat al-Jabal.
- 28 June: The Jerusalem Post reported that the Obama administration had requested US$500 million from Congress to use in the training and arming of "moderate" Syrian rebels fighting against the Syrian government, in order to counter the growing threat posed by ISIL in Syria and Iraq.
- 29 June: ISIL announced the establishment of a new caliphate. Abu Bakr al-Baghdadi was appointed its caliph, and the group formally changed its name to the "Islamic State".
- 30 June: Iraqi army recaptured the town of Mukayshifah, killing 40 IS members and capturing 13. Iraqi Army attempts to recapture Tikrit were repelled by IS, which lost 215 men according to Iraqi government sources.
- According to the UN, during the month of June at least 1,531 civilians and 886 members of the security forces were killed in Iraq—excluding Al Anbar Governorate—and 1,763 civilians and 524 were wounded; this was the highest number of casualties in Iraq since May 2007.

=== July 2014 ===
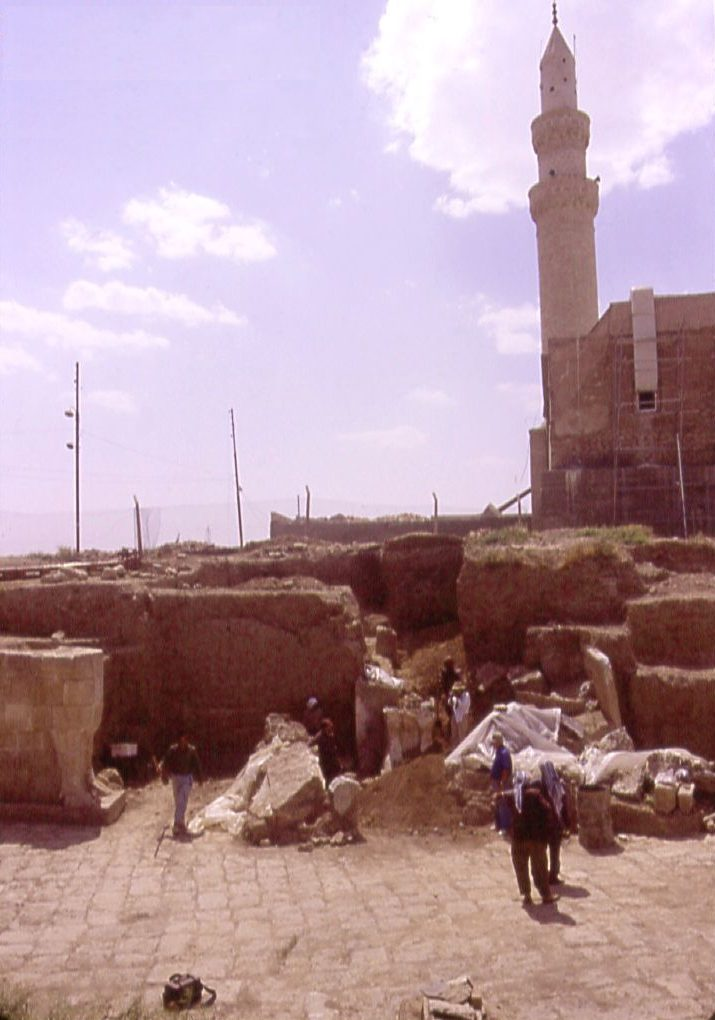
Prophet Yunus Mosque before being destroyed.

- 1 July: French intelligence services arrested a man suspected of planning an attack on French territory. He was back from Syria where he trained with IS.
- 2 July: Abu Bakr al-Baghdadi, the self-proclaimed caliph of the new "Islamic State" (IS), said that Muslims should unite to capture "Rome" in order to "own the world". He called on Muslims around the world to unite behind him as their leader.
- 3 July: IS captured Syria's largest oilfield, the al-Omar oilfield, from al-Nusra Front, which put up no resistance to the attack. The Iraqi Army recaptured the town of Awja near Tikrit.
- 7 July: IS abducted 11 civilians from the village of Samra near Tikrit for allegedly providing information to the Iraqi Army.
- 8 July: A candidate in the April general election and a judge of the Misdemeanour Court were abducted by IS in Ninewa.
- 9 July: IS kidnapped at least 60 former Iraqi Army officers in areas around Mosul.
- 11–12 July: IS members killed about 700 Turkmen civilians in the village of Beshir.
- 13 July: The bodies of 12 men, presumably killed while captive, were found in Tawakkul village northeast of Baquba.
- 16 July: Forty-two captured Iraqi soldiers were killed by IS in Awenat, south of Tikrit.
- 15 July: A new attempt by the Iraqi Army to recapture Tikrit was repelled; 52 Iraqi soldiers and 40 IS members were killed in the fighting.
- 17 July: Syria's Shaer gas field in Homs Governorate was seized by IS. According to the Syrian Observatory for Human Rights (SOHR), at least 90 National Defence Force guards defending the field were killed, as were 21 IS fighters. The SOHR later put the death toll from the fighting and the killing of prisoners at 270 soldiers, militiamen and staff, and at least 40 IS fighters.
- 19 July: IS claimed responsibility for a suicide bombing which killed 33 people and left more than 50 wounded. The explosion occurred in Baghdad's Kadhimiya district, which is the site of a major Shia shrine.
- 22 July: the Sunni Imam Abdul Rahman al-Jobouri was killed in Baquba for having denounced IS.
- 24 July: IS blew up the Mosque and tomb of the Prophet Yunus (Jonah) in Mosul, with no reported casualties. Residents in the area said that IS had erased a piece of Iraqi heritage. Jonah's tomb was also an important holy site in Jewish heritage.
- 25 July: IS captures a Syrian 17th Division base near Raqqa and beheads several captured soldiers, whose heads are displayed in Raqqa. 32 jihadists and 42 Syrian Army members were overall killed on this day in clashes between IS and Syrian Army in Hasakeh, Raqqa and Aleppo provinces. The remains of 18 Iraqi policemen, presumably killed while captive, were found in Abbasiyah, south of Tikrit.
- 26 July: IS blew up the Nabi Shiyt (Prophet Seth) shrine in Mosul. Sami al-Massoudi, deputy head of the Shia endowment agency which oversees holy sites, confirmed the destruction and added that IS had taken artefacts from the shrine. Syrian Army recaptured the Shaer gas field from IS.
- 27 July: about 40 bodies, presumably of Iraqi soldiers killed while captive, were found in a ditch near Jumela village. IS abducted 20 young students and a Sufi Muslim leader in al-Muhamadiya Mosque in Mosul.
- 28 July: To mark the Muslim holy festival of Eid al-Fitr, which ends the period of Ramadan, IS released a video showing graphic scenes of a large scale killing of captives.
- 29–30 July: 43 Shabak families were abducted by IS in villages near Mosul.
- The UN reported that of the 1,737 fatal casualties of the Iraq conflict during July, 1,186 were civilians and 551 security forces members. A further 1,511 civilians and 467 security forces members were wounded. The figures did not include Al Anbar Governorate.

US President Obama delivers an update on the situation and US position on Iraq, authorising airstrikes against IS and humanitarian aid for religious minorities trapped on a mountain.

=== August 2014 ===
- 1 August: The Indonesian National Counterterrorism Agency (BNPT) declared IS a terrorist organisation.
- 2 August: The Iraqi Army confirmed that 37 loyalist fighters had died during combat with IS south of Baghdad and in Mosul. The Patriotic Union of Kurdistan (PUK) claimed that "hundreds" of IS militiamen had died in the action.
- 2 August: IS and its al-Nusra Front allies invaded Lebanon in and around the town of Arsal, sparking a five-day battle with the Lebanese Army, which pushed IS near to the border with Syria. Over 100 fighters were killed and scores of civilians were killed or wounded.
- 3 August: IS fighters occupied the Iraqi city of Zumar and an oilfield in the north of Iraq, after a battle against Kurdish forces. Also the Yazidi city of Sinjar was captured, prompting a massacre of its inhabitants. More than 12 Yazidi children died of hunger, dehydration and heat on Jabar Sinjar. Ten Yazidi families fleeing from al-Qahtaniya area were attacked by IS, which killed the men and abducted women and children. 70 to 90 Yazidi men were shot by IS members in Qiniyeh village. 450–500 abducted Yazidi women and girls were taken to Tal Afar; hundreds more to Si Basha Khidri and then Ba'aj.
- 4 August: IS attacked Jabal Sinjar, killed 30 Yazidi men and abducted a number of women. Two Yazidi children and some elderly or people with disabilities died on Jabal Sinjar. 60 more Yazidi men were killed in the village of Hardan, and their wives and daughters abducted. Other Yazidi women were abducted in other villages in the area. Yazidi community leaders stated that at least 200 Yazidi had been killed in Sinjar and 60–70 near Ramadi Jabal.
- 5 August: An IS offensive in the Sinjar area of northern Iraq had forced 30,000–50,000 Yazidis to flee into the mountains. They had been threatened with death if they refused conversion to Islam. A UN representative said that "a humanitarian tragedy is unfolding in Sinjar". (See Genocide of Yazidis by IS.) The number of Yazidi children who died of hunger and dehydratation on Jabal Sinjar reached 40.
- 6 August: IS captured the town of Tal Keif. Between 3 and 6 August more than 50 Yazidi were killed near Dhola village, 100 in Khana Sor village, 250–300 in Hardan area, more than 200 between Adnaniya and Jazeera, dozens near al-Shimal village and on the road from Matu village to Jabal Sinjar, and more than 200 children had died from thirst, starvation and heat while fleeing to Jabal Sinjar; about 500 Yazidi women and children were abducted from Ba'aj and more than 200 from Tal Banat. Many of them were sold as sex slaves. More than 80,000 people, mostly Yazidi, fled Sinjar district.
- 7 August: IS took control of the town of Qaraqosh in the Iraqi province of Nineveh, which forced its large (50,000) Christian population to flee. Also the towns of Bartella, Tel Keppe, Karemlash and Makhmour fell to the IS on the same day. IS killed in Sinjar about 100 captive Shia Turkmen displaced from Tal Afar. A total of 200,000 Christian Assyrians fled from these cities and from villages in the Nineva plains.
- 7 August: US President Obama authorised targeted airstrikes in Iraq against IS, along with airdrops of aid. The UK offered the US assistance with surveillance and refuelling, and planned humanitarian airdrops to Iraqi refugees.
- 8 August: The US asserted that the systematic destruction of the Yazidi people by IS was genocide. The US military launched indefinite airstrikes targeting IS, with humanitarian aid support from the UK and France, in order to protect civilians in northern Iraq. IS had advanced to within 30 km of Erbil in northern Iraq. The UK is also considering joining the US in airstrikes.
- 10 August: The Battle for Tabqa Air base, the last bastion for Syrian military forces in the Raqqa province, began. France's Foreign Minister Laurent Fabius said that Iraq's Kurds must be equipped to fight against IS and indicated that France would consider providing arms aid. IS militants buried an unknown number of Yazidi women and children alive, in an attack that killed 500 people, in what has been described as ongoing genocide in northern Iraq. Kurdish forces retook the towns of Makhmour and al-Gweir.
- 11 August: The Arab League accused IS of committing crimes against humanity. The UK decided not to join the US in airstrikes and instead stepped up its humanitarian aid to refugees. The commander of the Sahwa militia in Hawija was abducted by IS.
- 12 August: The parents of kidnapped American journalist James Foley received an email from his captors. The US announced that it would not extend its airstrikes against IS to areas outside northern Iraq, emphasising that the objective of the airstrikes was to protect US diplomats in Erbil. The US and the UK airdropped 60,000 litres of water and 75,000 meals for stranded refugees. The Vatican called on religious leaders of all denominations, particularly Muslim leaders, to unite and condemn the IS for what it described as "heinous crimes" and the use of religion to justify them. An Iraqi helicopter involved in the rescue of Yazidis on Mount Sinjar crashed near Sinjar, killing Major General Majid Ahmed Saadi and injuring 20 people, including Yazidi Member of Parliament Vian Dakhil and a New York Times reporter.
- 13 August: The Syrian Observatory for Human Rights reported that IS had seized control of six villages near the Turkish border in the northern province of Aleppo in Syria.
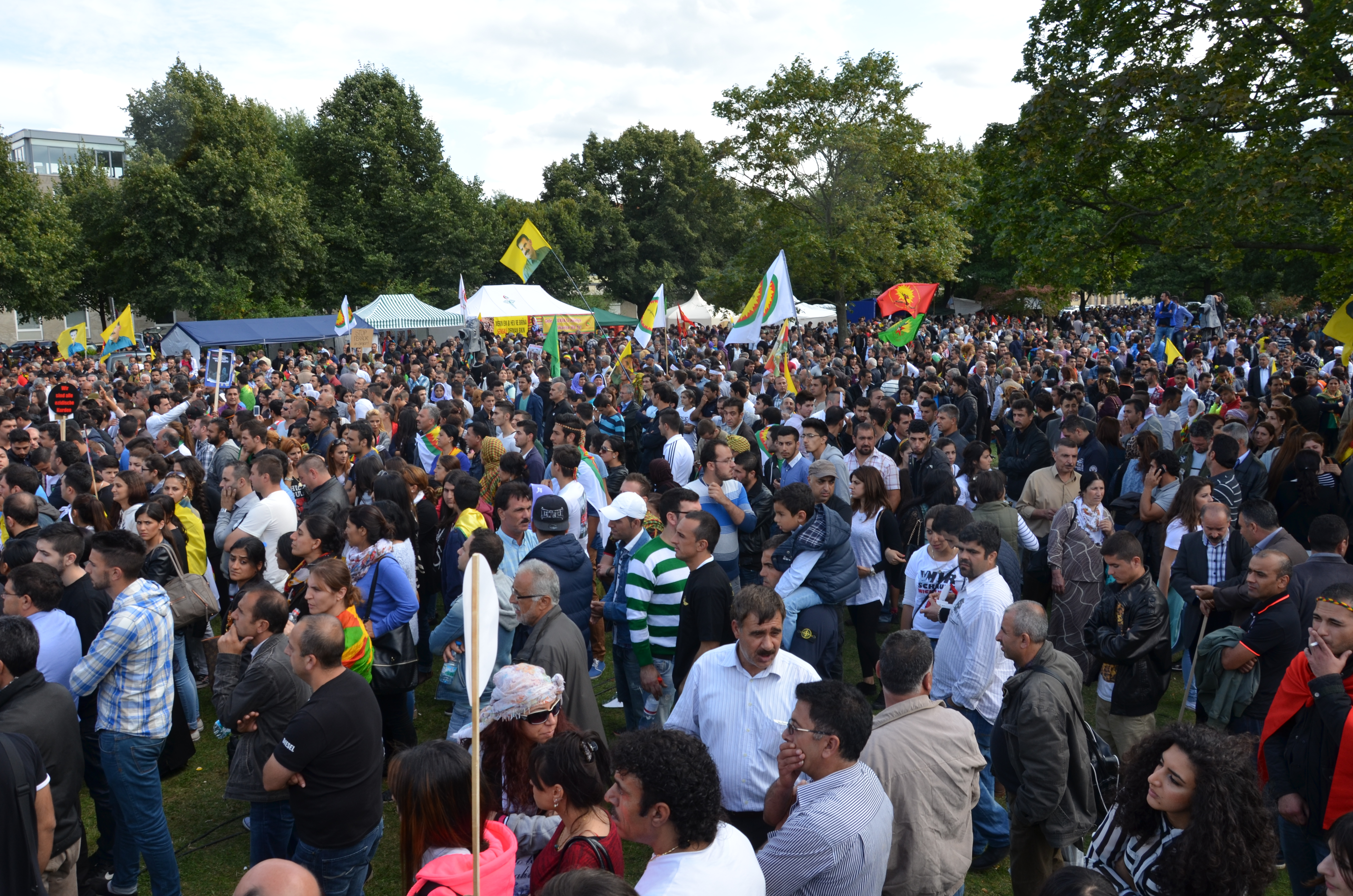
  More than 10,000 Kurds in Hanover protest against the terror of IS in Iraq, 16 August 2014
- 14 August: Kurdish Peshmerga forces and U.S. air strike broke the IS siege on Mount Sinjar, thus allowing tens of thousands of Yazidi refugees trapped there to escape. Nouri al-Maliki resigned from his position of Prime Minister of Iraq.
- 15 August: The United Nations Security Council issued a resolution which condemned "the terrorist acts of ISIL and its violent extremist ideology, and its continued ... systematic abuses ... of human rights and violations of international humanitarian law". The entire male population of the Yazidi village of Khocho, up to 400 men, were shot by IS, and up to 1000 women and children were abducted. Up to 200 Yazidi men were reportledy killed for refusing conversion in Tal Afar prison. The bodies of 12 men abducted by IS were found in Tikrit.
- 16 August: IS killed 80 Yazidis. The EU agreed to supply Kurdish forces with arms, and US military forces continued to attack IS in the area around Iraq's crucial Mosul Dam.
- 17 August: The SOHR reported that IS had killed 700 members of the Syrian al-Shaitat tribe, mostly civilians, after clashes over the control of two oilfields in the region. The Syrian Air Force launched 26 airstrikes on Raqqa city and around al-Tabqa, killing at least 31 IS fighters and 8 civilians and wounding dozens of IS fighters and 10 civilians Including the strikes launched in Deir ez-Zor area, the air strikes were overall 40. Peshmerga troops, aided by the US air campaign, began an offensive to take back the Mosul Dam from IS, amid fears that the destruction of the dam might unleash a 65-foot wave of water that would engulf the city of Mosul and flood Baghdad.
- 18 August: The Syrian Air Force launched another 20 airstrikes against IS positions in Raqqa, cutting off water supply to the city. Pope Francis, leader of the world's 1.2 billion Roman Catholics, said that the international community would be justified in stopping Islamist militants in Iraq. He also said that it should not be up to a single nation to decide how to intervene in the conflict.
- 19 August: According to the SOHR, IS now has an army of more than 50,000 fighters in Syria. American journalist James Foley was beheaded by IS on video tape. After three days of fighting, Kurdish Peshmerga and Iraqi Army forces, helped by American air strikes, recaptured the Mosul Dam. An attempt by the Iraqi Army to recapture Tikrit was repelled by the IS forces.
- 20 August: President Obama denounced the "brutal murder of Jim Foley by the terrorist group ISIL".
- 21 August: The US military admitted that a covert rescue attempt involving US Special Operations forces had been made to rescue James Foley and other Americans held captive in Syria by IS. The ensuing gunfight resulted in one US soldier being injured. The rescue was unsuccessful, as the captives were not in the location targeted. This was the first known engagement by US ground forces with suspected IS militants. The US Defense Secretary warned that IS were tremendously well-funded, adding, "They have no standard of decency, of responsible human behaviour," and that they were an imminent threat to the US.
- 22 August: The US is considering airstrikes on IS in Syria, which would draw US military forces directly into the Syrian Civil War, as President Obama develops a long-term strategy to defeat IS. As a reprisal for a car bombing which killed three militiamen, members of the Shi'ite al-Zarkoshi militia killed 73 Sunni civilians in the Musab bin Umair mosque.
- 24 August: IS forces captured Tabqa air base after two weeks of siege and fighting. A Syrian Mig-21 was destroyed. Overall, 346 IS fighters and 200–365 Syrian soldiers were killed in the battle for Tabqa, while 150 Syrian soldiers were reportedly captured and 700 managed to retreat. A Sheikh and a tribal leader were abducted by IS in Khuthrniya village in Iraq.
- 24–25 August: 14 elderly Yazidi men were killed by IS in the Sheikh Mand Shrine, and the Jidala village Yazidi shrine was blown up.
- 26 August: IS carried out a suicide attack in Baghdad killing 15 people and injuring 37 others.
- 27 August: IS captured more than 20 soldiers in the farmlands of Tabqa, while 27 soldiers and 8 IS fighters were killed in fighting at the Athraya checkpoint in eastern Hama countryside. 160–250 Syrian soldiers captured at Tabqa air base were killed by IS between 27 and 28 August.
- 28 August: IS beheaded a Lebanese Army sergeant whom they had kidnapped, Ali al-Sayyed. The group also beheaded a Kurdish Peshmerga fighter in response to Kurdistan's alliance with the United States. A Syrian air strike destroyed IS headquarters and killed six IS military leaders in the city of Mohasan. Another air strike killed or wounded dozens of IS militants near Mansoura Dam.
- 29 August: UK Prime Minister David Cameron raised the UK's terror level to "severe" and committed to fight radical Islam "at home and abroad".
- 31 August: Iraqi military forces supported by Shia militias and American airstrikes broke the two-month siege of the northern Iraqi town of Amerli by IS militants. 25 IS members were killed in the fight and 15 captured, while Iraqi losses were 16 killed, 6 killed while captive and 39 wounded. 19 captive Sunnis were killed by IS in Saadiya for refusing to swear allegiance. At the end of August the bodies of six truck drivers abducted by IS on 10 June and of at least 15 Iraqi soldiers captured and killed between 13 and 20 June were found in Suleiman Bek. German Federal Minister of Defence Ursula von der Leyen announced that Germany will send weapons to arm 4,000 Peshmerga fighters in Iraq fighting IS. The delivery will include 16,000 assault rifles, 40 machine guns, 240 rocket-propelled grenades, 500 MILAN anti-tank missiles with 30 launchers and 10,000 hand grenades, with a total value of around 70 million euros. In order to prevent an excessive accumulation of arms, the Bundeswehr seconded six liaison officers to Erbil.
- The U.N. stated that at least 1,265 civilians and 155 members of the security forces were killed in Iraq during August, without counting the casualties in Al Anbar Governorate and northern Iraq under IS control; 1,370 more people were wounded and 600,000 displaced.
- By the end of the month, more than 5,000 Yazidi civilians had been killed and 5,000 to 7,000 abducted by IS, according to the United Nations.

=== September 2014 ===
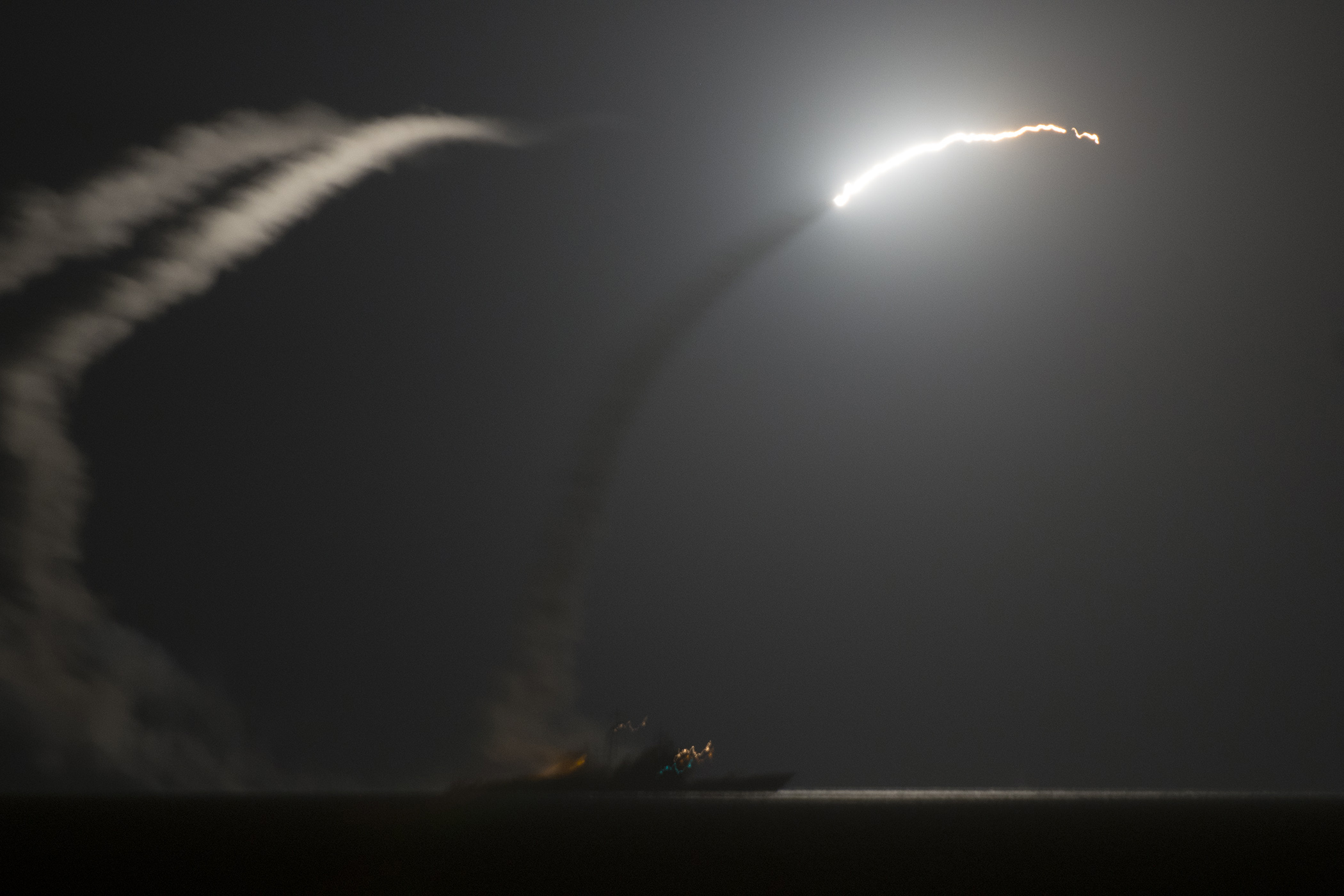
Tomahawk missiles fired by USS Philippine Sea and USS Arleigh Burke against IS targets in Syria, September 2014

- 1 September: The Iraqi Army recaptured the town of Suleiman Bek and killed 23 Chechen IS militants. The German government's Cabinet decision to arm the Kurdish Peshmerga was ratified in the Bundestag by a "vast majority" of votes, after an emotional debate. The Yazidi villages of Kotan, Hareko and Kharag Shafrsky were set on fire by IS.
- 2 September: IS released a video showing the beheading of American journalist Steven Sotloff. Kurdish Peshmerga recaptured from IS the town of Zumar. A hundred relatives of the cadets and soldiers killed at Camp Speicher in June broke into the Iraqi Parliament to ask for explanations.
- 4 September: A member of IS issued a threat to President Vladimir Putin, vowing to oust him over his support of Bashar al-Assad's government. An IS self-appointed court sentenced to death and then ordered the killing of 14 men. Sheik Maisar Farman el-Waka, a candidate of the April general election was killed in public by IS in al-Houd village along with his two brothers. Another candidate of the parliamentary elections, Zaina Nouri Mullah Abdallah el-Ansi, was killed in Mosul.
- 5 September: The German Bundeswehr dispatched the first of a series of cargo planes to Iraq, loaded with helmets, vests, radios, and infrared night-vision rifle scopes. After a stopover in Baghdad for inspection, the aircraft will deliver the equipment to the Kurdish fighters. Qasem Soleimani, Commander of the elite Iranian Revolutionary Guard Quds Force, has been to the Iraqi city of Amirli, to work with the United States in pushing back IS.
- 7 September: the governor of Al Anbar Governorate, Ahmad Khalaf al-Dulaimi, was seriously wounded by mortar fire in the newly retaken town of Barwana. IS killed 40 people in Mosul after trial by a self-appointed court. About 40 men were abducted from Tal Ali village for having burned IS flags after IS retreat from the village. The men were released some days later, after having been tortured.
- 8 September: IS carried out a double suicide attack in a town north of Baghdad, killing nine people and wounding 70 others. An IS attack against the town of Duloeliyah killed at least 20 civilians and wounded 120 more. Nouri Al-Maliki was succeeded by Haider Al-Abadi as Prime Minister of Iraq.
- 9 September: Peshmerga fighters discovered a mass grave containing the bodies of 14 civilians, presumably Yazidis. Another Imam was killed in Mosul for refusing to declare his fealty to IS.
- 10 September: President Obama announced a new rollback policy and coalition in the Middle East after IS beheaded two American journalists and seized control of large portions of Syria and Iraq.
  America will lead a broad coalition to roll back this terrorist threat... We will ultimately destroy, ISIL through a comprehensive counterterrorism strategy.
- 13 September: UK humanitarian aid worker David Cawthorne Haines, whose life had been threatened by Mohammed Emwazi in the Steven Sotloff video, was purportedly beheaded in a video.
- 14 September: A number of Algerian commanders of al-Qaeda in the Islamic Maghreb broke allegiance with al-Qaeda, swore loyalty to IS and created the group Jund al-Khilafah.
- 15 September: The Battle of Suq al Ghazi ended with a US–Iraqi win.
- 17 September: IS launched a major offensive to capture the YPG-controlled city of Kobani/Ayn al-Arab.
- 18 September: The Australian Federal Police, Australian Security Intelligence Organisation, Queensland Police and New South Wales Police launched the largest counterterrorism operation in Australian history. The targets were IS-linked networks thought to be planning to launch mass-casualty attacks in populated areas. Fifteen people were arrested in the raids with one being charged with terrorism offenses.
- 19 September: Four French air strikes had hit the town of Zumar, killing dozens of militants. Those were the first air strikes conducted by French Air Force in Irak.
- 20 September: The hostages from the Turkish consulate in Mosul who had been captured on 11 June 2014 were released.
- 21 September: IS forces overran the Iraqi military base of Saqlawiyah and captured the towns of Saqlawiyah and Sicher; 155–370 or more Iraqi soldiers were killed in the attack, with 68–400 being captured.
- 21 September: Official spokesman Abu Mohammad al-Adnani released a speech encouraging Muslims around the world to kill non-Muslims.
- 22 September: Two weeks after her abduction, Iraqi human rights activist Samira Salih al-Nuaimi was publicly executed by IS.
- 22 September: Iraqi media stated that 300 Iraqi soldiers were killed by an IS chlorine gas attack in Saqlawiyah.
- 23 September: Aerial operations began over Syria. Cruise missiles and precision-guided bombs struck IS targets in Syria, and military aircraft from Bahrain, Jordan, Saudi Arabia, Qatar, and the United Arab Emirates participated in the airstrikes against IS. The Syrian Observatory for Human Rights estimated that about 400 IS fighters died in the airstrikes. Nasr Al-Fahd, representing IS, issued a fatwa which was translated by Walid Shoebat. Shoebat claims the fatwa included murdering millions of Americans and Western Europeans.
- 24 September: Jund al-Khilafah, an Algerian group affiliated to IS, beheaded French tourist Hervé Goudel, who had been kidnapped on 21 September, as a reprisal for French intervention against IS. A group of influential Muslim scholars publish an Open Letter to Baghdadi claiming al-Baghdadi's interpretation of the Quran is illegitimate.
- 29 September: IS released a third video showing journalist John Cantlie. As in previous videos, Cantlie appears alone, wearing an orange prison uniform. The scripted video criticises US president Barack Obama's strategy of using airstrikes to defeat IS.
- 30 September: Kurdish Peshmerga forces recaptured the town and border crossing of Rabia.
- According to the UN, at least 1,119 people (854 civilians and 265 members of the security forces) died from "acts of violence" in Iraq during September, excluding those who died in Al Anbar Governorate and those who succumbed to "secondary effects" such as lack of food, water and medical care; 1,946 were wounded, 1,604 of them civilians.

=== October 2014 ===
- 1 October: The town of Taza Kharmatho was retaken by Peshmerga and Iraqi Army forces, but remained uninhabitable, due to the booby traps that had been left by IS.
- 2 October: The Turkish Parliament voted 298:98 to authorise anti-IS operations, following concerns over IS advances close to Turkey's borders. Turkey will allow foreign anti-IS military operations to be launched from within its borders and gave authorisation for Turkey's military to be sent into Syria.
- 3 October: Australian Prime Minister Tony Abbott announced that Australia would contribute eight F/A-18F Super Hornets to aid the war effort against Islamic extremists in Iraq. The aircraft join a KC-30A Tanker and an E-7A Wedgetail AEW&C aircraft already deployed.
- 3 October: IS released a video showing the beheading of British aid worker Alan Henning and threatened American aid worker Peter Kassig.
- 4 October: IS captured the Iraqi city of Kabisa. Two bombs killed seven people and wounded 18 in the towns of Tarmiyah and Husseiniya. An Iraqi officer and seven soldiers were killed in two ambushes in Diyala province in Iraq.
- 5 October: A joint IS–al-Nusra invasion of Lebanon was beaten back by Hezbollah. 800 IS militants in Libya partially take over the Libyan town of Derna.
- 7 October: The House of Commons of the Parliament of Canada voted 157:134 to authorise the Royal Canadian Air Force to conduct airstrikes against IS in Iraq.
- 8 October: Terrorists claiming to be "Islamic State in Gaza" took responsibility for an explosion in the French Cultural Centre in Gaza City. However, a group by the same name denied responsibility for the blast. The blast did not result in casualties. The incident was downplayed by Hamas as being a generator malfunction.
- 10 October: Spanish Defence Minister Pedro Morenés announces that Spain will send 300 troops to Iraq in non-combat roles.
- 11 October: Car bombings killed at least 38 people in Baghdad. Additionally, IS dispatched 10,000 fighters from Syria and Mosul to take over Baghdad. Also, Iraqi Army forces and Anbar tribesmen threatened to abandon their weapons if the US does not send in ground troops to halt IS's advance.
- 12 October: Two improvised explosive devices killed General Ahmad Sadak al Dulaymi, chief of police of the Al Anbar province, and three others.
- 13 October: US planes launched 21 strikes against IS forces, near the besieged town of Kobanî in northern Syria, near the border with Turkey.
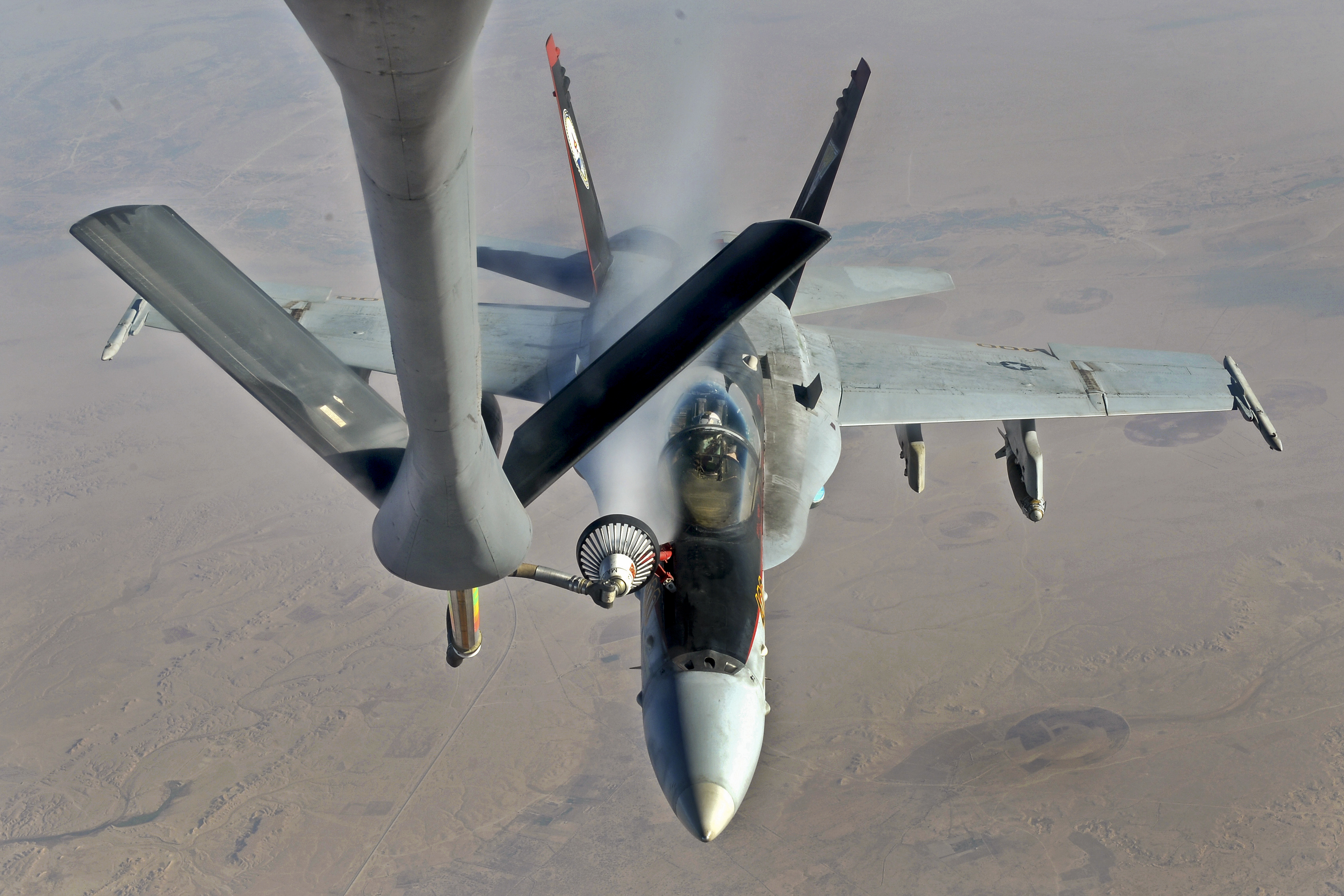
  A U.S. Navy F-18E Super Hornet receives fuel from a KC-135 Stratotanker over Iraq before conducting an airstrike, 4 October 2014. The aircraft are supporting operations against IS
  Also, IS fighters made it within 25 kilometres (15.5 miles) of the Baghdad Airport.
- 14 October: IS forces captured the Iraqi city of Hīt, after the 300-strong Iraqi Army garrison abandoned its local base, and about 180,000 civilians fled the area. Five Tehrik-i-Taliban Pakistan leaders in Pakistan swore loyalty to IS, after fundamentalists in Egypt and Libya had done the same several days earlier. A suicide car bombing killed 25 people in Baghdad, including Iraqi Parliament member and deputy leader of the Badr Organisation Ahmed al-Khafaji; three others were killed by a roadside bomb. Reports spread about the formation of small Syrian groups which target and kill IS members in IS-controlled territory.
- Between 7 and 14 October 42 people were killed in Turkey in clashes between Kurdish fighters and IS supporters, 12 of them in Diyarbakir.
- 15 October: The US anti-IS operation was named "Operation Inherent Resolve". The US launched 18 airstrikes against IS in Kobani. Forty-six captives were killed by IS in Mosul.
- 16 October: By this date, IS had been driven out of most of Kobani. Four car bombings killed 36 people and wounded 98 in Baghdad Italian Defence Minister Roberta Pinotti announced that Italy would send 280 soldiers to train Kurdish fighters, along with two Predator drones and a KC-767 refuelling plane.
- 17 October: Iraqi Army troops and police stormed an IS camp in Jaberiya, killing 60 IS militants; other senior IS figures were killed in another attack near Ramadi Three MiG-21 or MiG-23 fighters were being flown by IS militants who were undergoing training by former Iraqi Ba'ath officers at Al Jarrah air base. Yemen leaders of Al-Qaeda in the Arabian Peninsula urged all jihadists to join IS in the fight against Western "crusaders".
- 17–18 October: The US launched 25 airstrikes against IS in Syria and Iraq.
- 18 October: Car bombings killed 30 people in Baghdad.
- 19 October: A suicide bomber killed 19 people and wounded 28 others outside a Shia mosque in Baghdad.
- 20 October: Airstrikes killed 60 IS militants in Al Anbar Governorate in Iraq. Suicide bombers and car bombings killed 43 people and wounded 85 others in Baghdad and Karbala. After preventing Kurdish reinforcements from reaching Kobani for weeks, Turkey finally agreed to let Peshmerga reinforcements pass through Turkish territory. The US Air Force started dropping weapons and supplies to the Kurds comprising the resistance in the town. IS members wounded and tried to kidnap Abu Nissa, the leader of the rebel group Liwa Thuwwar al-Raqqa, in the Turkish town of Urfa The remaining 2,000 Yazidis in the Sinjar area—mainly volunteer fighters but also hundreds of civilians—were forced by IS to retreat to the Sinjar mountains.
- 21 October: A series of bombings killed at least 30 people and wounded 57 others in Baghdad, while mortar shells fell inside the Green Zone. A suicide attack killed 15 Peshmerga fighters and wounded 20 near Mosul Dam. According to the SOHR, 40 fighters from Jabhat al-Nusra, including an emir, joined IS. It was also reported that the US had accidentally airdropped weapons to IS.
- 22 October: Car bombings killed 37 people and wounded 66 in Baghdad. Syrian Air Force claimed that it destroyed two fighter jets previously captured by IS at Jarrah air base. An American volunteering with the YPG claimed that IS have used chemical weapons during the siege of Kobani, providing photos.
- 23 October: IS militants recapture a hill to the west of Kobani. The village of Zauiyat albu Nimr and the surrounding area, in Al Anbar Governorate, was captured by IS after weeks of fighting with the Sunni Albu Nimr tribe; 60 people were captured. Al-Sheikh Khayri, a Yazidi commander, was killed in the fighting on Mount Sinjar. Abu Qahtan, an IS commander, was killed in fights with Kurdish Peshmerga near Mosul Dam. The Syrian Observatory for Human Rights announced that 464 IS militants, 57 Al-Nusra militants and 32 civilians had been killed in U.S. air strikes since September. Also, IS fighters made it within 25 kilometers (15.5 miles) of the Baghdad Airport.
- 24 October: A double attack on an Egyptian army checkpoint in the Sinai Peninsula killed at least 30 Egyptian soldiers. Ansar Bayt al-Maqdis which has recently pledged allegiance to IS has taken responsibility of the attacks.
- 24 October: IS fighters take control of air-drop zone outside Kobani. Iraqi officials confirm that IS militants have targeted Iraqi troops with chemical weapons. Evidence from Kobani suggests IS used chemical weapons against defenders.
- 25 October: The Iraqi Army retakes the town of Jurf al-Sakhar (67 Iraqi soldiers and pro-government militias and 300 IS militants were killed in the battle, according to Iraqi sources), while Peshmerga forces retake the town of Zumar, and ten surrounding villages, killing 81 IS militants. The U.S. Air Force launched 22 air strikes between 24 and 25 October. Nidal Malik Hasan, the killer of the 2009 Fort Hood shooting, requested "to be made a citizen of the Islamic State". Six Lebanese soldiers, two civilians and an at least nine militants were killed in clashes with IS-linked Sunni militants in the city of Tripoli, which also led to the arrest of 20 suspects. A suicide bomber killed 8 Shiite militiamen and wounded 17 in the Iraqi town of Taji.
- 26 October: during the Siege of Kobani, IS failed for the fourth time to capture the border gate with Turkey in the northern al-Jomrok neighbourhood. The Iraqi army retook four villages in the Himreen mountains. Two bombs killed five people and wounded 15 in Baghdad.
- 27 October: IS car bombings killed 27 Iraqi soldiers and Shia militiamen and wounded 60 in Jurf al-Sakhar, and killed 15 civilians and wounded 23 in Baghdad. The U.S. Air Force launched 11 more air strikes in Iraq and Syria. The Lebanese Army took the last positions held by IS militants in Tripoli, after 11 Lebanese soldiers, eight civilians and 22 militants were killed in three days of battle; 162 militants were captured. IS released another video with British hostage John Cantlie, in which he claimed that the city of Kobani was mostly under IS control, with only a few pockets of Kurdish resistance remaining. He also claimed that the Battle of Kobani was "largely over", and that IS forces were mostly mopping up in the city. The captions in the video, displaying the Turkish flags at the border, claimed that it was filmed by one of the four IS drones. However, the video has been deemed to be IS propaganda, especially since analysts claim that it was filmed about a week earlier. Additionally, 200 Iraqi Kurdish forces will soon arrive in Kobani as reinforcements, via the Syrian-Turkish border.
- 29 October: Australian IS leader and recruiter Mohammad Ali Baryalei was confirmed to have been killed. Fifty Free Syrian Army and 150 Kurdish Peshmerga reinforcements reached Kobani. The US launched 14 air strikes in Iraq and Syria between 28 and 29 October. Two-hundred and twenty members of the Albu Nimr tribe were killed while captive by IS, 70 in Hīt and 150 in Ramadi. IS forces captured three gas wells east of Palmyra in Homs province, and killed 30 Syrian Army soldiers in an attack on the Shaer gas field. A suicide bomber killed five policemen and wounded 18 civilians in Youssifiyah near Baghdad. IS released the last 25 of a group of 150 Kurdish children previously kidnapped from Kobani. The Iraqi Army retook six villages near Baiji.
- 30 October: IS captured the Shaer gas field near Homs, Syria. Norway announced that it would send 120 soldiers to Iraq to help train the Iraqi Army to fight IS.
- 31 October: The UN stated that overall 15,000 foreign fighters had joined IS in Iraq and Syria. While battle raged in Baiji between IS and the Iraqi Army and Shia militia, bombings killed 15 people and wounded 34 in and near Baghdad. Abu Bakr al-Baghdadi was proclaimed caliph of the "Islamic Caliphate of Derna" established by jihadists in Derna, Libya.
- The UN reported that at least 1,273 Iraqis—856 civilians and 417 members of the security forces—were killed "by violence" during October (379 civilians in Baghdad alone) and that 2,010 were wounded, not counting the casualties in Al Anbar Governorate and other IS-held areas.

=== November 2014 ===
- 1 November: IS killed 50–67 more displaced members of the Albu Nimr tribe, in the village of Ras al-Maa. Thirty-five bodies of members of the same tribe were found in another mass grave. News spread that IS had started killing former police and army officers in areas under its control—especially Mosul—in order to prevent possible uprisings. Among those killed were Colonels Mohammed Hassan and Issa Osman. Suicide bombers and car bombings killed at least 24 people and wounded dozens in the Baghdad area. Ten US airstrikes were launched in Syria and Iraq.
- 2 November: IS killed 50–75 more members of the Albu Nimr tribe in Ras al-Maa and Haditha and 17 were kidnapped. Overall, 322 members of the Albu Nimr tribe had been killed by 2 November. Car bombings killed 44 Shia pilgrims and wounded 75 in Baghdad. Also, in response to the US-led airstrikes, representatives from Ahrar ash-Sham attended a meeting with the al-Nusra Front, the Khorasan Group, the Islamic State of Iraq and the Levant, and Jund al-Aqsa, which sought to unite several hard-line groups against the US-led Coalition and other moderate Syrian Rebel groups.
- 3 November: IS claimed to have captured the Jahar gas field in Homs province, Syria. After ransoms had been paid, 234 Yazidis kidnapped in August were released. Canadian planes launched their first airstrikes against IS near Fallujah. US planes launched 14 airstrikes on 2–3 November. IS killed 36 more members of the Albu Nimr tribe in Ras al-Maa.
- 4 November: IS released 93 Syrian Kurds kidnapped in February.
- 5 November: A leader of the Albu Nimr tribe stated that 540 of its members had been killed by IS. US allies conducted 23 airstrikes between 3 and 5 November in Iraq and Syria. The Syrian Army and militia recaptured the Jhar and Mahr gas fields near Homs from IS.
- 7 November: Car bombings in Baiji, killed eight servicemen and policemen—among them Faisal Malek—and wounded 15. The US decided to send 1,500 more troops to Iraq, increasing the number of US troops stationed there to 3,000. Also, a US airstrike killed 20 IS militants near Mosul, including Abu Ayman al-Iraqi, The IS's Military Chief, who was replaced by Abu Suleiman al-Naser. Abu Ayman al-Iraqi, Top IS commander in Iraq, was wrongly reporty killed at that time. Rumours spread that Abu Bakr al-Baghdadi may have been killed or seriously wounded in the attack.
- 8 November: Twenty-seven IS fighters were poisoned by Syrian rebels who had infiltrated as cooks into the Fath El-Shahel camp; twelve were killed. Six car bombings killed 40 people and wounded 90 in Baghdad and Ramadi.
- 9 November: The Syrian Air Force bombed the IS-held town of Al-Bab in Aleppo province, killing 21 and wounding over 100.
- 10 November: Seventy more members of the Albu Nimr tribe were killed by IS near Hit. The main Egyptian militant group operating in Sinai Ansar Beit al-Maqdis pledged allegiance to IS. RAF drones were launched in their first airstrikes against IS in Iraq.
- 11 November: A car bombing killed eight people and wounded 13 in Baiji, which had been largely recaptured by the Iraqi Army; more car bombings killed nine people and wounded 24 in and near Baghdad.
- 12 November: Kurdish forces in Kobanî cut off a road used as a supply route by IS. The road connects Kobanî with Raqqa. The Kurdish forces managed to cut off the supply route from Raqqa after capturing parts of the strategic Mistanour Hill. Idris Nassan, a local official in Kobanî, claimed that IS's control over the town had been reduced to less than 20 percent.
- 14 November: The Iraqi Army retook the city of Baiji from IS. Car bombings killed 17 people and wounded 57 in Baghdad.
- 14 November: Clashes between the Filipino army and Islamist militants with links to the Islamic State and al-Qaida. Five soldiers and nine gunmen with the Abu Sayyaf extremist group were killed in the gun battle that broke out in Sulu province's mountainous Talipao town. A further 26 soldiers and 30 militants were wounded.
- 16 November: IS released a video showing a beheaded American hostage, Peter Kassig, and the beheading of 15 Syrian Army prisoners. Kurdish fighters captured six buildings from Islamic State militants besieging the Syrian town of Kobani, and seized a large haul of their weapons and ammunition.
- 19 November: Radwan Taleb al-Hamdoun, IS Governor of Mosul, was reportedly killed in Mosul. His car was hit by an air strike killing him and his driver.
- 21 November: IS disrupts cellular phone calls in Mosul. IS fears informants are passing information to Iraqi forces.
- 22 November: A German father fighting at Mount Sinjar asks for more US airstrikes in the region between Sinjar and Dahuk, so that he and his family can go back to their lands and "live in peace".
- 23 November: Iraqi and Peshmerga forces began a campaign to retake the towns of Jalawla and Saadiya in the Diyala Governorate, with a senior official in the Patriotic Union of Kurdistan party declaring the liberation of both towns. A Kurdish commander declared all of Jalawla to be under the control of Peshmerga forces. Several casualties were sustained when planted bombs left behind by IS exploded. Dozens of soldiers were wounded in the fighting. Ammar Hikmat, deputy governor of Saladin Province, announced an attack by Iraqi forces on IS on the Baghdad-Samarra road. Iraqi TV reported the road successfully opened.
- 25 November: The Syrian Arab Air Force launched a series of airstrikes on Raqqa, killing at least 60 people. A monitor for the Syrian Observatory for Human Rights (SOHR) reported at least 63 deaths, over half of which were civilian. The SOHR also reported the stoning to death of two young men by IS, for alleged homosexuality. The killings occurred in the Deir ez-Zor Governorate, one in Mayadin and the other in Deir ez-Zor.
- 29 November: IS launched a counter-attack in Kobanî, by detonating four suicide cars and explosive belts, following clashes between the two conflicting parties in the town. According to the SOHR, eight YPG fighters and 17 IS fighters were killed in the clashes. According to the German news outlet 'Der Spiegel', IS fighters also attacked YPG positions near the border gate from Turkish soil. According to the SOHR, YPG fighters crossed the Turkish border and attacked IS positions on Turkish soil, before pulling back to Syria. Soon afterwards, the Turkish Army regained control of the border crossing and silos area.

=== December 2014 ===
- 2 December: According to reports, Saja al-Dulaimi, one of al-Bagdadi's wives—or a former wife—and his daughter were arrested in Lebanon and held for questioning.
- 6 December: The Libyan Army begins a ground assault of the IS-occupied city of Derna, Libya, and army units moved within a few kilometres of Derna, retaking control of villages and roads leading to the city.
- 10 December: Man charged on accounts of homosexuality then thrown off a building in northern Iraq by the Islamic state, then he was stoned to death by a crowd.
- 12 December: F-16 jets from Morocco join the Counter-DAESH Coalition effort, hitting IS targets near Baghdad and other unidentified areas.
- 13 December: IS advanced within 32 km of the city of Ramadi in the Al Anbar Governorate, west of Baghdad. The city of Hīt is currently confirmed to be under IS control.
- 14 December: During the early morning hours of 14 December, U.S. ground forces allegedly clashed with IS alongside the Iraqi Army and Tribal Forces near Ein al-Asad base, west of Anbar, in an attempt to repel them from the base where about 100 U.S. advisers are stationed, when IS attempted to overrun the base. According to a field commander of the Iraqi Army in Al Anbar Governorate, "the U.S. force equipped with light and medium weapons, supported by F-18, was able to inflict casualties against fighters of ISIL organisation, and forced them to retreat from the al-Dolab area, which lies 10 kilometres from Ain al-Assad base." This is said to be the first encounter between the United States and IS, in four years. However, this claim has been called "false" by The Pentagon.
- 16 December: India bans support for IS, but some officials fear that the ban may impact the fate of 39 Indian construction workers who were captured by IS in Iraq.
- 17 December: Peshmerga forces launched the Sinjar offensive from Zumar and managed to break the Siege of Mount Sinjar, recapture more than 700 square kilometres of territory, close in on Tal Afar, clear areas north of Mount Sinjar, and pushed into the city of Sinjar. The offensive is ongoing as of 17 December
- 18 December: Fadhil Ahmad al-Hayali alias Haji Mutazz, the deputy in Irak of IS leader al-Baghdadi, was wrongly reported dead at that time by a senior U.S. military official. Abd al Basit, Military emir in Iraq, is also allegedly reported dead.
- 18 December: Three rebel groups near the Golan Heights region, which had previously been aided by the United States, switched sides and pledged loyalty to IS.
- 19 December: US General James Terry announced that the number of U.S. airstrikes to date on IS had increased to 1,361.
- 21 December: The Sinjar offensive ends in a decisive Kurdish victory, and the city of Sinjar is momentarily captured, as IS forces retreated to Tell Afar and Mosul.
- 22 December: Kurdish forces claim that IS control of Kobanî was reduced to 30%.
- 23 December: U.S. conducts 10 air strikes in Syria and Iraq. The air strikes destroy oil combining equipment and kill some unknown number of fighters.
- 24 December: SOHR reported that IS shot down an Anti-IS Coalition warplane near Raqqa, and IS supporters claimed on social media, with photos, to have captured the Jordanian pilot. The US said the plane crashed, but was not shot down. Also, an IS suicide bombing in Madin killed 15 pro-government Sunni fighters and 7 Iraqi soldiers, and wounded 55.
- 25 December: Iraqi police reported that the newly appointed IS governor of Mosul was killed in a counter-IS coalition airstrike. Hassan Saeed Al-Jabouri, also known as Abu Taluut, had been in office less than 25 days, replacing another man killed earlier in December 2014. It was also revealed that US planned to retake Mosul in January 2015.
- 27 December: The U.S. and other Coalition nations conducted 23 airstrikes against IS.
