= Zaghareed =

Iraqi village

Zaghareed (also: Zigareid, Zagharid, al-Zagharid) is a village in Iraq, which is located in the Al Anbar Governorate north of the city of Fallujah, between the town of Saqlawiyah and the villages of Shiha and Albu Sudayra.

In 2016, during the Siege of Fallujah and Operation Breaking Terrorism, there was intense fighting in the area between the Iraqi army and ISIL militants. On 29 May, Iraqi troops seized a key bridge between Zaghareed and Saqlawiyah in order to facilitate the entry of the security forces from the international highway road into the center of Saqlawiyah.
