= 2016 Saqlawiyah massacre =

Coordinates: 33.396°N 43.684°E

The 2016 Saqlawiyah massacre took place in June 2016, during the aftermath of the Third Battle of Fallujah, as many as 643 local Sunni tribesmen from the area of Saqlawiyah were abducted by the Shiite militia Kata'ib Hezbollah. After being moved to remote locations, they were tortured and extrajudicially murdered.

== Aftermath ==
Dead bodies of at least 300 civilians were found in the al-Nourain school yard in the village. All of the victims were from the al-Saqlawiya tribe. According to a local activist, 605 people who were detained during the fighting had on Sunday been taken to the al-Mazraa army base, east of Fallujah. A video alleging to feature released detainees showed a number of men receiving treatment for injuries to their heads and upper bodies.
