= Fall of Hīt (2014) =

- Part of the War in Iraq
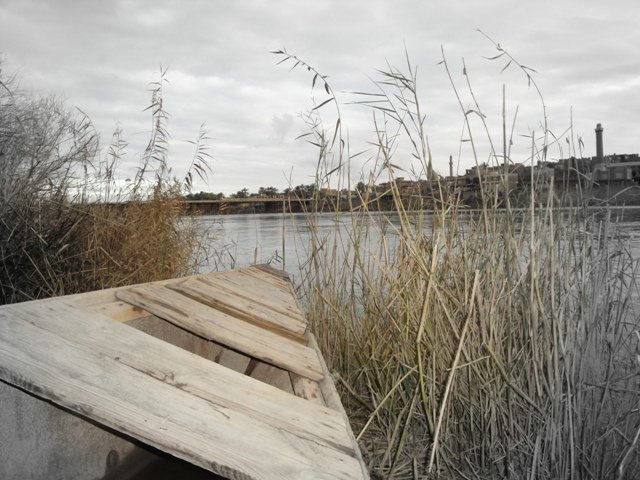
- Hīt in 2013
| Date | October 2–14, 2014 (1 week and 5 days) |
| Location | Hit, Iraq |
| Result | IS victory |

Belligerents
| Islamic State | Republic of Iraq; United States |

Units involved
| Military of the Islamic State | (Iraq) Iraqi Armed Forces |

Casualties and losses
- Over 180,000 civilians displaced 250 civilians killed

The Fall of Hīt was the capture of the important Iraqi town of Hīt by IS, which cut off the road leading to nearby Haditha.

== Events ==
On October 2, it was reported that a major battle had broken out in the city of Hīt. IS claimed that they had taken control of the city, but pro-government fighters said that fighting was ongoing. However, the following day, Iraqi officials said that 90% of the town was not under their control. IS flags were reportedly flying on government buildings, including the governor's office and police station. The assault began after a suicide bomber attacked the city, according to Iraqi officials. They looted many tanks and other military equipment as well. There were also unconfirmed reports that they left the town as a result of coalition airstrikes.

On October 5, a suicide bomber detonated an explosive-rigged vehicles into a military checkpoint near the entrance of the city, killing 3 and wounding 5. The suicide bombing took place in the eastern part of the city, and killed Capt. Mohammed Saad as well.

On October 13, IS took control of a major military base in the region, after Iraqi forces abandoned it. Coalition airstrikes failed to dislodge the militants, and a large number of refugees had to flee the town. 50% of the population had fled the town due to the airstrikes as well. They retreated to the Asad Airbase, which included many senior officers among them. IS captured more equipment, including 3 tanks and other vehicles.

=== Refugee crisis ===
During and after the fighting, many people fled Hīt and other places in the Anbar Province. According to UN officials, more than 180,000 people were displaced because the fighting, and many have gone to government-held areas of Ramadi. Many civilians were left in need of food, blankets and medical supplies.

=== War crimes ===
After the fall of the town, IS executed several members of the Albu Nimr tribe, because they had fought against them. Many have been abducted from their homes, and their fate is unknown. However, they are widely believed to be dead. A mass grave was discovered outside the city, which had the bodies of 200 people, and an additional 48 fighters were paraded through the streets before being executed. Despite this, the tribe said that they will try to retake the city.

== See also ==
- Hīt shooting
- Fall of Mosul
