= Battle of Zumar =

2014 battle between the Islamic State and the Kurdistan Autonomous Region forces

Coordinates: 36.6575°N 42.6065°E

- Part of the Northern Iraq offensive (August 2014)
Date	1 August – 25 October 2014 (2 months, 3 weeks and 3 days)
Location	Zummar subdistrict, Nineveh Province, Iraq
Result	Peshmerga victory: Peshmerga counterattack successful

Belligerents
Kurdistan Region: Peshmerga; Air support: France	Islamic State

Commanders and leaders
(Kurdistan Region) Sarbast Babiri (Until 3 August 2014)	(Islamic State) Abu Ibrahim al-Hashimi al-Qurashi

Strength
Unknown	Unknown

Casualties and losses
14 killed	100 killed 38 captured

The Battle of Zumar was fought between the Islamic State and Kurdish Peshmerga troops over the city of Zumar in Nineveh province in northern Iraq. It started when IS launched an offensive on Zummar from 1–4 August 2014, resulting in its capture. On 25 October, after US airstrikes, Kurdish Peshmerga troops succeeded in recapturing the city, after an unsuccessful attempt to hold it in September.

== Capture by IS ==
Beginning on 1 August 2014, IS attacked Kurdish Peshmerga positions in and around the city of Zumar. According to Kurdish sources, the initial advance of IS was repelled with some 100 jihadist militants and 14 Kurdish troops killed; 38 more IS jihadists were captured by Peshmerga. However, three days later, IS captured the town as well as its oil field. The victorious IS force was reportedly led by Amir Mohammed Abdul Rahman al-Mawli al-Salbi, one of the group's ministers and a deputy to Abu Bakr al-Baghdadi.

== Aftermath ==
=== Kurdish counteroffensive ===
On 31 August Kurdish Peshmerga troops entered Zumar. The Kurdish forces launched the offensive after capturing the Ain Zalah oilfields just outside Zumar two days earlier. IS fighters torched three oil wells as they retreated from Ain Zalah. The Peshmerga have been able to recapture several IS-controlled towns after receiving weaponry from the United States and other nations. As a result of the attack by Peshmerga forces on the Zumar, more than 92 IS militants have been killed and a further 160 taken to hospitals in Mosul with severe injuries. Kurdish forces were eventually forced to leave Zumar after enduring heavy losses.

=== French air strikes on IS ===
Qassim al-Moussawi, a spokesman for the Iraqi military, said on 19 September 2014 that four French air strikes with Dassault Rafale fighter aircraft, had hit the town of Zumar, killing dozens of militants, AP news agency reported.

=== Kurdish recapture of Zumar ===
On 25 October 2014, Kurdish forces launched an offensive on the town. IS forces put up fierce resistance, and launched a car bomb attack on Peshmerga forces. Iraqi television said that 50 IS fighters were killed and 10 vehicles destroyed. After seventeen US airstrikes on the town, Kurdish forces took control of it. Their future goal is to regain control of nearby Sinjar, which was the scene of a massacre against Yazidi Kurds. The Daily Beast reported that American and German special forces were involved in coordinating airstrikes in Zumar; a report which The Pentagon denied.

== See also ==
- Spillover of the Syrian Civil War
