= Saqlawiyah =

As Saqlāwīyah الصقلاوية
- City
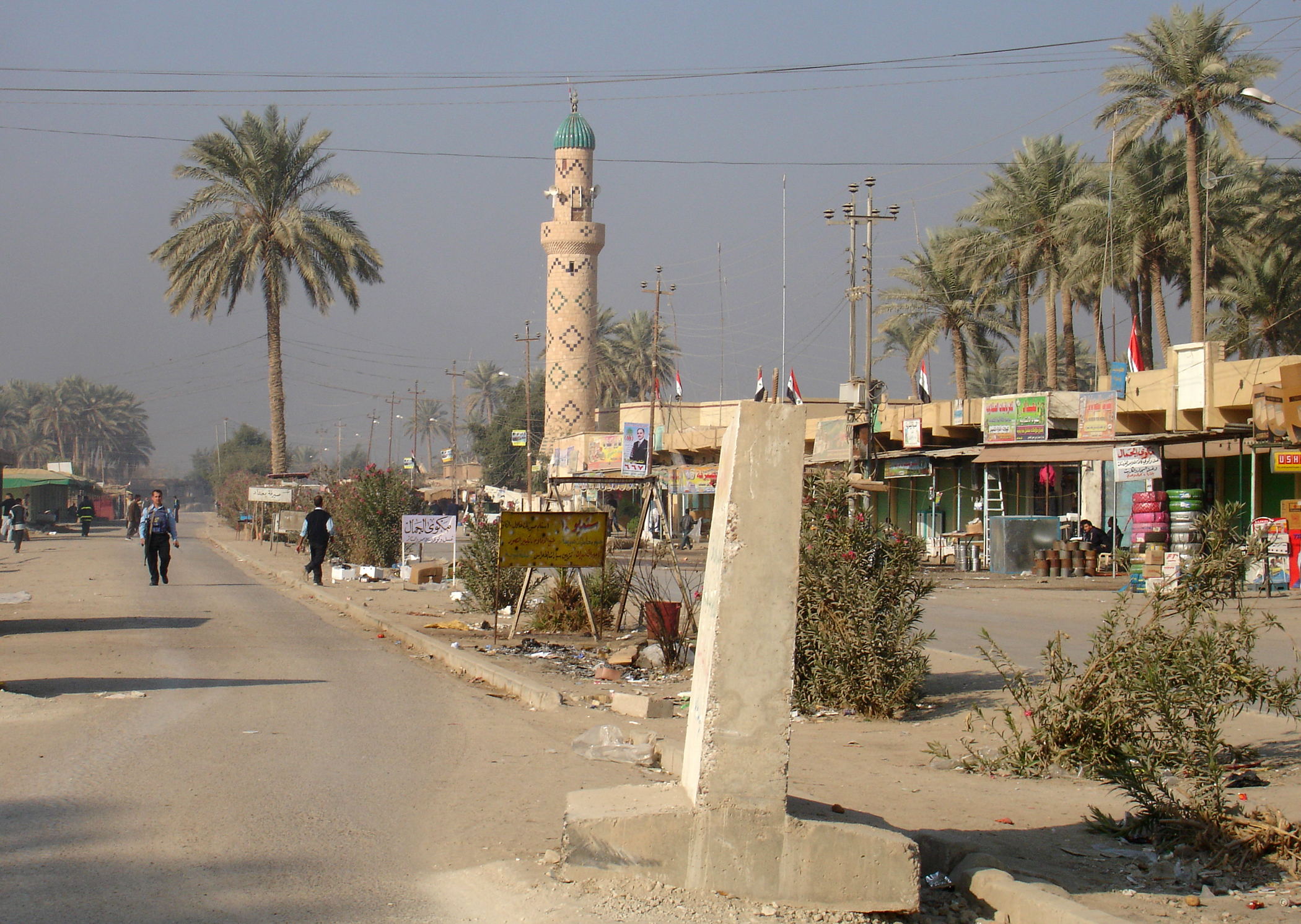
- As Saqlāwīyah in 2005
- Etymology: Named after a mare of the Saqlawiyah strain of the Juboor clan
- Interactive map of As Saqlāwīyah
- Location in Iraq
- Coordinates: 33°23′47″N 43°41′0″E
- Country: Iraq
- Province: Al-Anbar
- Elevation: 42 m (138 ft)

Population (2012)
  - Total: 25,000
- Time zone: UTC+3 (GMT+3)
  - Summer (DST): UTC+4 (GMT+4)

As Saqlāwīyah (Arabic: الصقلاوية, romanized: aṣ-Ṣaqlāwīyah) is a city in Al Anbar Governorate, in central Iraq. It is located roughly 5 miles (8 km) northwest of the city of Fallujah.

Saqlawiyah is a rural city in between Habbaniyah and Fallujah that sits on the major freeway. The city was named after an Arabian Mare of the Saqlawiyah strain of the Juboor clan. Another narrative states that the city was named after an eponymous river in Diwaniya by immigrants from that region. Due to the canal network that runs through the area, agriculture is an import identity to Saqlawiyans. Due to its proximity to the major freeway, there are many shops along the road that cater to the transient crowds.

== IS control and recapture ==
Saqlawiyah came under IS control in September 2014 during the Siege of Saqlawiyah, as several hundred Iraqi soldiers were killed.

In 2016, during the Siege of Fallujah and Operation Breaking Terrorism, there was intense fighting in the area between the Iraqi army and IS militants. On 29 May, Iraqi troops seized a key bridge between nearby village of Zaghareed and Saqlawiyah in order to facilitate the entry of the security forces from the international highway road into the center of Saqlawiyah.

On 4 June, Iraqi forces captured the town of Saqlawiyah, conducting searches for numerous IEDs left by IS. All IS militants on board of a raft were killed as they were trying to escape on Euphrates River.

In the aftermath of the recapture of the town, as many as 643 Sunni tribesmen from Saqlawiyah were abducted, tortured, and extrajudicially killed by the state-backed Shia militia Kata’ib Hezbollah in a massacre.

== See also ==
- 2016 Saqlawiyah massacre

== Gallery ==
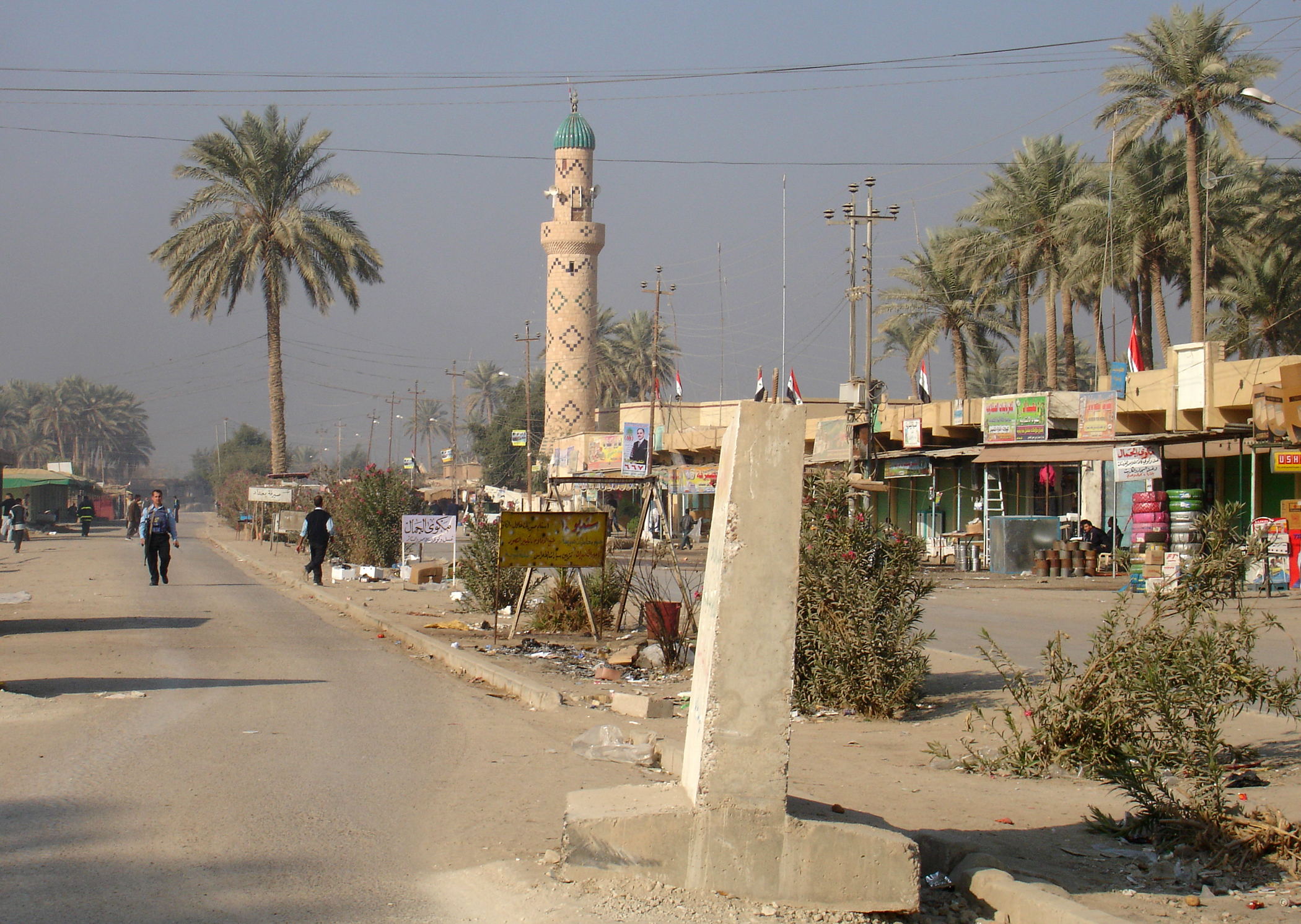
As Saqlāwīyah in 2005

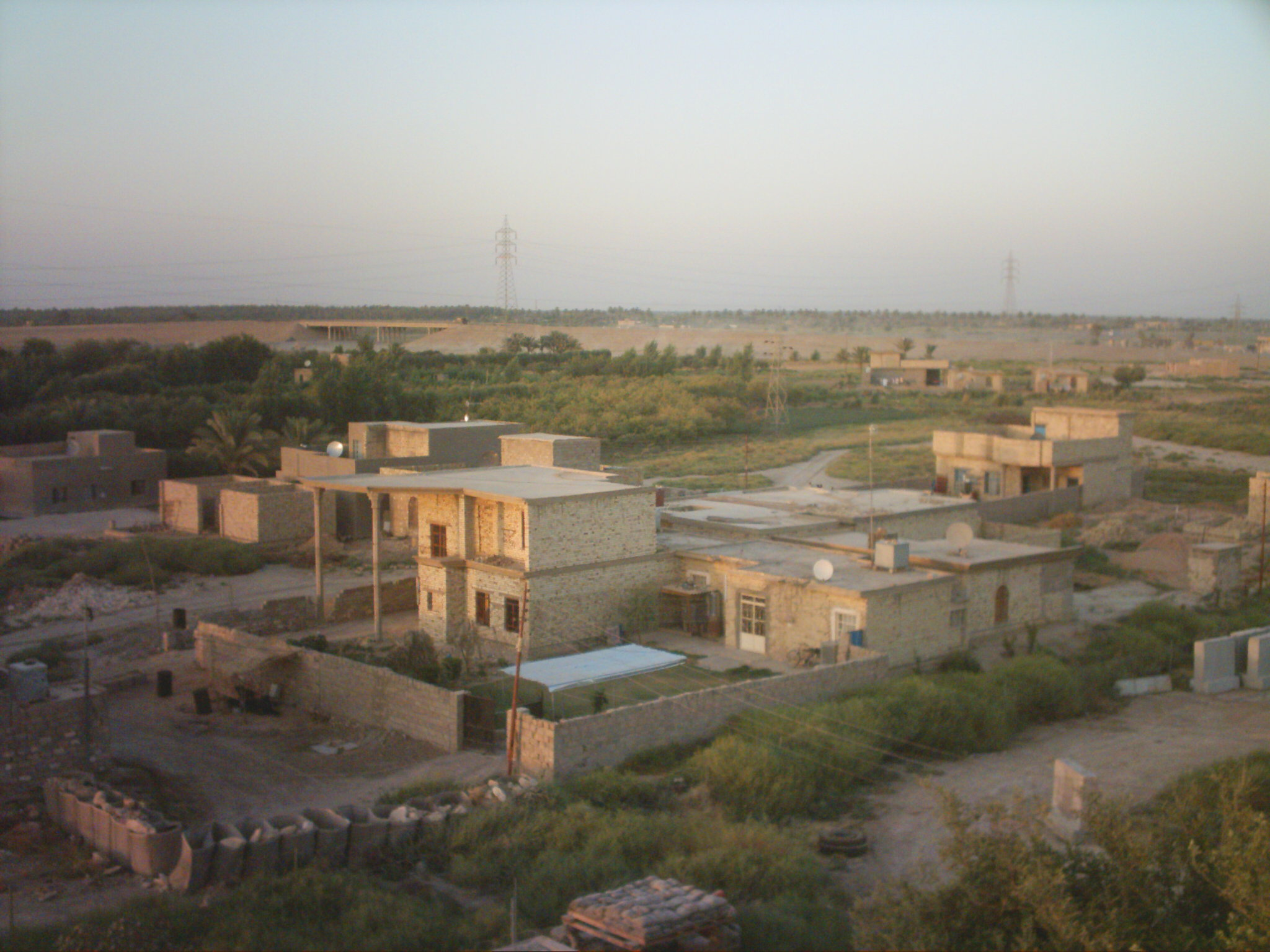
Housing on the outskirts of As Saqlāwīyah

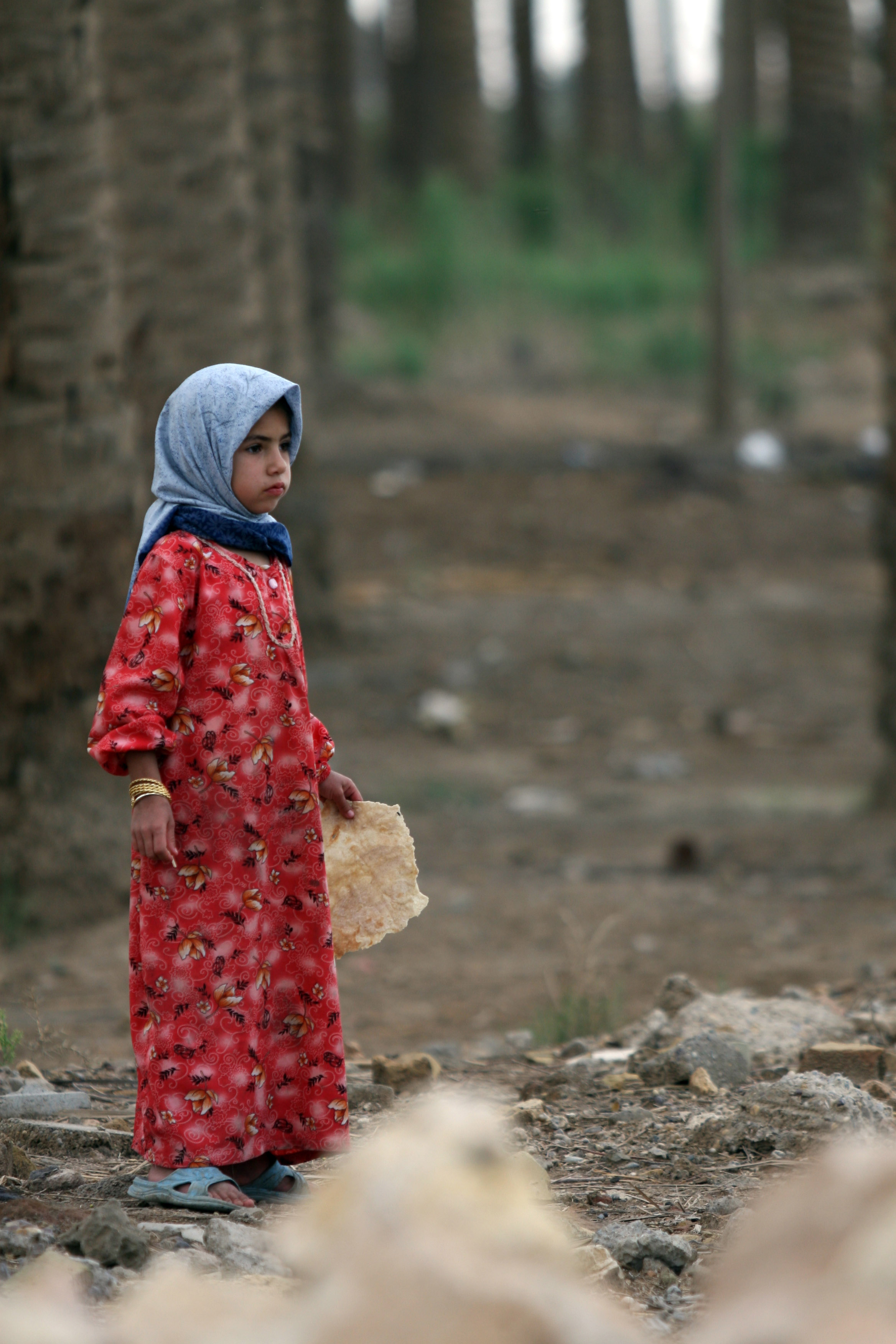
An Iraqi girl holding Lavash
