= Siege of Saqlawiyah =

2014 battle between Iraq and ISIS

Coordinates: 33.3964°N 43.6833°E

- Part of the War in Iraq (2013–2017)
| Date | 14−22 September 2014 (1 week and 1 day) |
| Location | Saqlawiyah, Al Anbar Governorate, Iraq |
| Result | IS victory: IS captures Saqlawiyah and Sicher |

Belligerents
| Iraq: Iraqi Army; Iraqi Air Force | Islamic State |

Strength
| 820 | unknown |

Casualties and losses
| 300–500 killed, captured or missing(40–300 killed 68 captured) | 14+ killed |

The siege of Saqlawiyah was a siege of the town of Saqlawiyah (north of Fallujah, 50 km west of Baghdad) by the Islamic State (IS) during the War in Iraq of 2013 to 2017.

== Events ==
=== Siege ===
The siege began when IS besieged Camp Sicher and cut the Sicher main road, which opened the way for them to siege Saqlawiyah. The besieged soldiers were without any support or food. On 21 September, IS militants entered Camp Saqlawiyah, which contained 1,000 soldiers, after they controlled the regions around the city, by disguising themselves in army uniforms. The besieged soldiers immediately thought that this was the military support that was sent by the government. Lt. Col. Ihab Hashim said "Two explosives packed vehicles blew up, while three Jihadists had explosives packed vests". 200 soldiers out of almost 1,000 others succeeded in escaping the camp. Five surviving soldiers stated to The Washington Post that 300–500 soldiers of the 1,000 others are either dead, kidnapped or in hiding. The other 400 soldiers were besieged in Camp Saqlawiyah until 300 of them were killed.

A representative in the Iraqi Parliament, Abdul-Hussein al-Mousawi, stated "ISIS has besieged 210 soldiers in different places of Saqlawiyah and Sicher."

=== Military efforts ===
On 20–22 September, the Iraqi Army, being led by the Anbar operations commander, Rashid Flayih, claimed to have succeeded in breaking the siege on the 400 soldiers in Camp Saqlawiyah, only to end up losing 300 of them after an assault that allegedly involved chlorine gas and IS militants disguised as Iraqi soldiers. Once inside the base, the disguised IS soldiers detonated several Humvees in a suicide attack. Iraqi soldiers attempted to hold off the IS convoy at the entrance as the survivors gathered into groups and retreated from the base, leaving it to be overrun by the Islamic State.

The new Prime Minister of Iraq, Haider al-Abadi, ordered to prison the commanders of the regiments that were positioned in Saqlawiyah and Sicher and interrogate them. The spokesman of al-Abadi stated "The General Commander of the Iraqi Armed Forces ordered on 18 September to send support and reinforcement to the besieged soldiers in Saqlawiyah, he also ordered to intensify the overflights on the bases of ISIS." While other military sources assured that the security leaders refused to obey the orders, which led al-Abadi to send the anti-terrorism forces to arrest them and interrogate them. A lot of sources said that Haider al-Abadi wanted to let go of all the pro-Maliki officers who obstructed the orders of al-Abadi.

== See also ==
- Northern Iraq offensive (June 2014)
- Northern Iraq offensive (August 2014)
- Siege of Amirli
- Camp Speicher massacre
