= Zummar =

District and town in northern Iraq

Zummar زمار
- Town and subdistrict
- Interactive map of Zummar
- Location in Iraq
- Coordinates (Zummar): 36°46′13.4688″N 42°38′17.6814″E
- Country: Iraq
- Governorate: Nineveh Governorate
- District: Tel Afar District
- Subdistrict: Zummar
- Relocated: After construction of the Mosul Dam
- Seat: Zummar

Population (2017)
  - Total: 50,000
- Time zone: UTC+3 (AST)
- Area code: +964
- ISO 3166 code: IQ-NI
- Zummar lies on the west bank of the Tigris River, 60 km northwest of Mosul. It is known for wheat farming and its two oil fields: Ain Zala oil field and Batma oil field, both operated by the North Oil Company.

Zummar (Arabic: زمار) also Zemar or Zumar, is both the name of an Iraqi subdistrict located in north Nineveh Governorate and of its seat, the town of Zummar. The population are Sunni Arabs, most of whom work in agriculture. Wheat is the prime crop there.

In August 2014, Zummar subdistrict fell into ISIL's hands. In October 2014, Zummar was recaptured by the Kurdish Peshmerga. It stayed under the control of the Kurdistan Regional Government until 2017, when it was captured by the Federal government of Iraq during the 2017 Iraqi–Kurdish conflict.

== Zummar town ==
Zummar town is the seat of Zummar subdistrict. It is located 60 km north west of Mosul city at the west bank of the river Tigris. Its population is 50,000 inhabitants. With the building of the Mosul dam, the town got relocated further south to its current position.

== Oil fields ==
The Zummar subdistrict is rich with oil. It contains two oil fields, both run by North Oil Company, yield a sort of heavy crude oil.

- Ain zala oilfield was explored by a British company in 1939. It is 16 km long and 4 km wide. Production was delayed after World War II until 1951 when the Mosul oil company branch of Iraq Petroleum Company started production with 20,000 barrels per day, but the production degraded later to 5,000 barrels, as it is currently.
- Batma oil field was discovered by Mosul oil company, a branch of Iraq Petroleum Company 1953. The oilfield is 12 km long and 6 km wide. The production commenced in that year with 50,000 barrels per day. The production has been stopped since 1990 due to the United Nations' financial and trade embargo ('sanctions') against Iraq after its invading Kuwait. Resumption of production has been postponed further after the Iraq War. Batma is considered a small field compared with other Iraqi fields, where its potential production is not more than 5,000 barrels per day.
