= Karl G. Taylor Sr. =

Marine Corps Medal of Honor recipient (1939-1968)

Karl Gorman Taylor Sr.
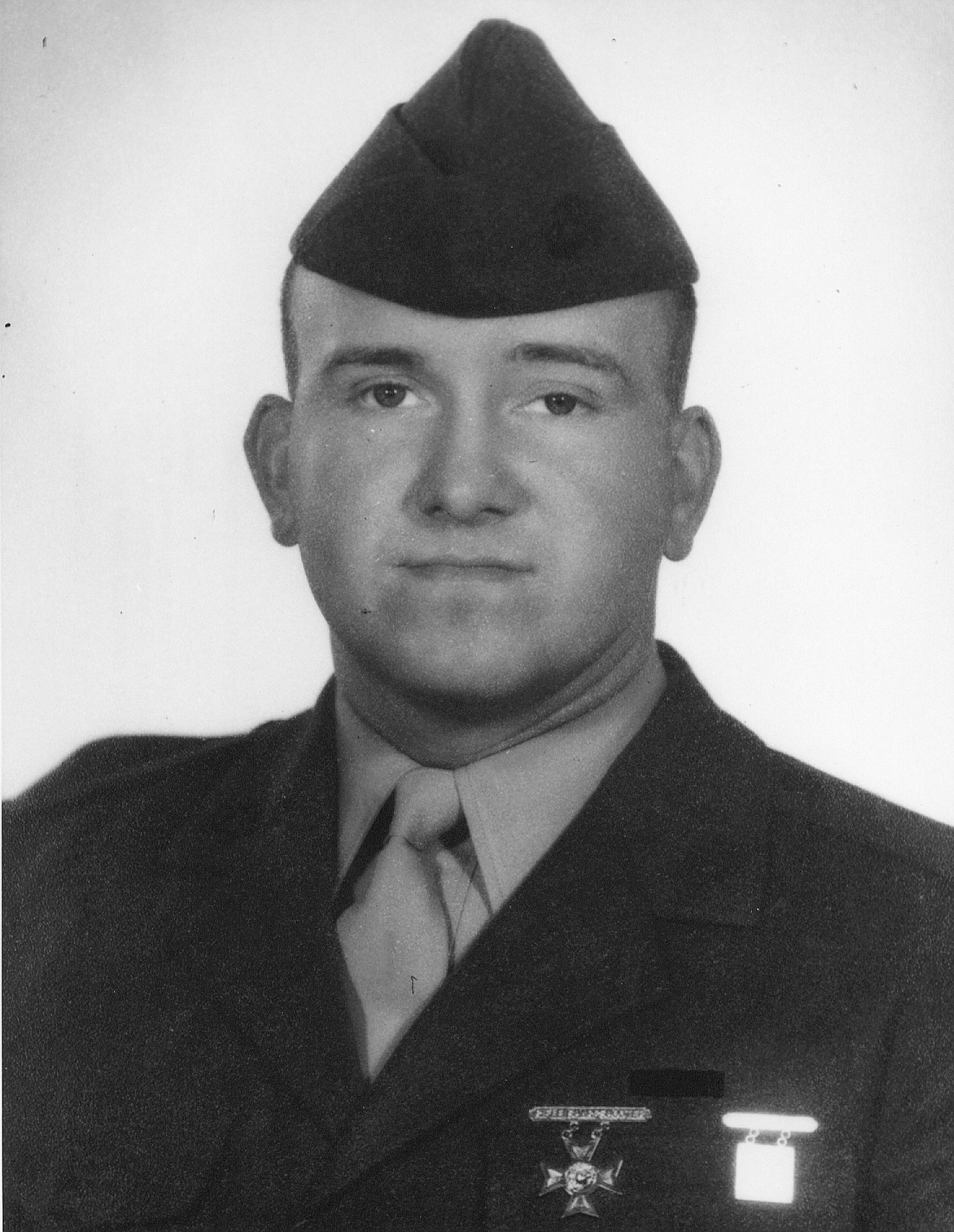
- Born: July 14, 1939; Laurel, Maryland, U.S.
- Died: December 8, 1968 (aged 29) near Da Nang, Quang Nam Province, South Vietnam
- Burial place: Independence Cemetery, Independence Township, Washington County, Pennsylvania
- Military career
- Allegiance: United States
- Branch: United States Marine Corps
- Service years: 1959–1968
- Rank: Staff Sergeant
- Units: 1st Battalion 6th Marines, 2nd Battalion 3rd Marines, 3rd Battalion, 26th Marines
- Conflicts: Vietnam War: Operation Meade River (DOW)
- Awards: Medal of Honor; Purple Heart Medal; Combat Action Ribbon; RVN Military Merit Medal; RVN Gallantry Cross

Karl Gorman Taylor Sr. (July 14, 1939 – December 8, 1968) was a United States Marine Corps staff sergeant who was killed in action during his second tour of duty in the Vietnam War. He was posthumously awarded the Medal of Honor, the nation's highest military decoration for valor, for his heroic actions on December 8, 1968.

== Early life and education ==
Karl Taylor was born on July 14, 1939, in Laurel, Maryland. He graduated from Arundel Junior High School in 1953, then attended Arundel Senior High School until 1956. After leaving high school, he was employed by a construction company as a Tournapull-Scraper Operator. In 1961, he received a high school equivalency diploma from the Armed Forces Institute in Madison, Wisconsin.

== U.S. Marine Corps ==
He enlisted in the United States Marine Corps along with his brother, Walter William Taylor, at Recruiting Station Baltimore on January 15, 1959. Upon completion of recruit training with the 3rd Recruit Training Battalion at Marine Corps Recruit Depot Parris Island, he went on to infantry combat training with the 1st Infantry Training Regiment, Marine Corps Base Camp Lejeune. After completing infantry training in July 1959, he was assigned duty as a rifleman, section leader, and a platoon guide, successively, with Company A, 1st Battalion 6th Marines, 2nd Marine Division. He was promoted to private first class on July 1, 1959; to lance corporal on March 1, 1960; and to corporal on October 24, 1960. From January until February 1962, he attended the Drill Instructor School at Parris Island, then served as a Drill Instructor at 2nd Recruit Training Battalion until January 1963.

After this enlistment tour was over, Cpl. Taylor returned to inactive duty for three months and was with the 4th Marine Corps Reserve and Recruitment District at Philadelphia. On March 26, 1963, he returned to active duty at Marine Corps Base Quantico, and served as Assistant Police Sergeant and, later, Police Sergeant, Guard Company, Service Battalion, Marine Corps Schools. He was promoted to sergeant on December 1, 1963.

=== Vietnam War ===
He was transferred to the 3rd Marine Division, in August 1964. Sgt. Taylor saw a one-year tour of duty as rocket section leader and platoon guide, with Company G, 2nd Battalion 3rd Marines which included duty in South Vietnam. Reassigned to Sub Unit #2, Headquarters Company, Headquarters and Service Battalion, Fleet Marine Force, Pacific, in August 1965, he served as an instructor for the NCO Leadership School until the following November.

In January 1966, he returned to the United States and to Marine Corps Schools, Quantico, for duty as Candidate Company Platoon Sergeant and Platoon Sergeant of Company A, 2nd Platoon, Officer Candidate School. He was promoted to staff sergeant on September 1, 1966. In February 1968, he returned to the 3rd Marine Division in Vietnam, this time for duty as Platoon Sergeant and Company Gunnery Sergeant of Company I, 3rd Battalion, 26th Marine Regiment.

==== Death ====
Staff Sgt. Taylor was mortally wounded while participating in Operation Meade River on December 8, 1968, as he was charging an enemy machine gun bunker with a grenade launcher to allow his rifle company platoon members to rescue wounded Marines. He was able to take out the enemy position just before he was killed. He was awarded the Medal of Honor posthumously for his heroic actions that day.

==== Medal of Honor ====
In a White House ceremony on February 16, 1971, President Richard Nixon presented Staff Sgt. Taylor's Medal of Honor to his family – his wife, daughter, age 8, and two sons, age 7 and 4.

==== Burial ====
Staff Sgt. Taylor is buried in Independence Cemetery at Independence Township, Washington County, Pennsylvania.

== Military awards ==
Taylor's military decorations and awards include:

	Medal of Honor	
Purple Heart Medal	Combat Action Ribbon	Presidential Unit Citation w/ 3/16" bronze star
Marine Corps Good Conduct Medal w/ two 3/16" bronze stars	National Defense Service Medal	Vietnam Service Medal w/ three 3/16" bronze stars
Republic of Vietnam Military Merit Medal	Republic of Vietnam Gallantry Cross w/ Palm	Republic of Vietnam Campaign Medal w/ 1960- Device

=== Medal of Honor citation ===
The President of the United States in the name of the Congress takes pride in presenting the MEDAL OF HONOR posthumously to

STAFF SERGEANT KARL G. TAYLOR
UNITED STATES MARINE CORPS

for service as set forth in the following CITATION:

For conspicuous gallantry and intrepidity at the risk of his life above and beyond the call of duty while serving as a Company Gunnery Sergeant during Operation MEADE RIVER in the Republic of Vietnam on the night of 8 December 1968. Informed that the commander of the lead platoon had been mortally wounded when his unit was pinned down by a heavy volume of enemy fire, Staff Sergeant Taylor along with another Marine, crawled forward to the beleaguered unit through a hail of hostile fire, shouted encouragement and instructions to the men, and deployed them to covered positions. With his companion, he then repeatedly maneuvered across an open area to rescue those Marines who were too seriously wounded to move by themselves. Upon learning that there were still other seriously wounded men lying in another open area, in proximity to an enemy machine gun position, Staff Sergeant Taylor, accompanied by four comrades, led his men forward across the fire-swept terrain in an attempt to rescue the Marines. When his group was halted by devastating fire, he directed his companion to return to the company command post; whereupon he took his grenade launcher and, in full view of the enemy, charged across the open rice paddy toward the machine gun position, firing his weapon as he ran. Although wounded several times, he succeeded in reaching the machine gun bunker and silencing the fire from that sector, moments before he was mortally wounded. Directly instrumental in saving the lives of several of his fellow Marines, Staff Sergeant Taylor, by his indomitable courage, inspiring leadership, and selfless dedication, upheld the highest traditions of the Marine Corps and the United States Naval Service.

/S/ RICHARD M. NIXON

== Family ==
Taylor's son Kevin enlisted in the Marine Corps in 1984. In 1997, he was with the Construction Equipment Repair Branch, MCB Quantico, Virginia.

== Vietnam Veterans Memorial and naming ==
- Taylor has his name inscribed on the Vietnam Veterans Memorial on Panel 37W, Row 070.
- In 2001, Marine Corps League Detachment 1084 was named "Marine Corps League SSgt. Karl G. Taylor Sr. Detachment 1084" in Jessup, Howard County, Maryland.

== See also ==
- List of Medal of Honor recipients
- List of Medal of Honor recipients for the Vietnam War
- 5th Marine Division
