= Al-Karmah =

Al Karmah الگرمة
- Interactive map of Al Karmah
- Coordinates: 33°24′15″N 43°54′48″E
- Country: Iraq
- Governorate: Al Anbar

Population (2013)
  - Total: 95,000
- Time zone: UTC+3 (GMT+3)
- Postal code: 31013

Al-Karmah, also sometimes transliterated as Karma, Karmah, or Garma (Iraqi Arabic: الگرمة), is a city in central Iraq, 16 km (10 mi) northeast of Fallujah in the province of Al Anbar.

== U.S. invasion and occupation of Iraq ==
For most of 2005 to 2007, Al-Karmah was considered the most violent city in Iraq. Unlike neighboring Fallujah, it has no surrounding wall, so anti-American insurgents could move freely in and out of it. Attacks by mortar and small arms occurred almost daily on coalition patrols, convoys, and the FOBs (Forward Operating Bases) of OP (Observations Posts) 2, 2A, Delta (later Donica) and OP 3 (later Muhammed).

During the Second Battle of Fallujah, residents of Karma funneled weapons and medical aid into the besieged city, proudly proclaiming their allegiance to the insurgency. The city's cement factory was shelled by US artillery that month as the factory was being used as a rebel position.

In early 2005, a massive vehicle-borne IED was driven into Observation Post 2 Alpha, injuring 4 U.S. Marines from 2nd Battalion, 2nd Marines, Fox Company 3rd Platoon, destroying two ISO containers filled with MREs and bottled water, and damaging the Hesco barriers and concertina lines along the western wall. In later raids on houses in the area, a video was found of the preparation and execution of the attack. It resulted in more barricades and new speed bumps being placed in and around the roads leading to OP-2A and the other observation posts, and the reinstallation of the ground-level M240G.

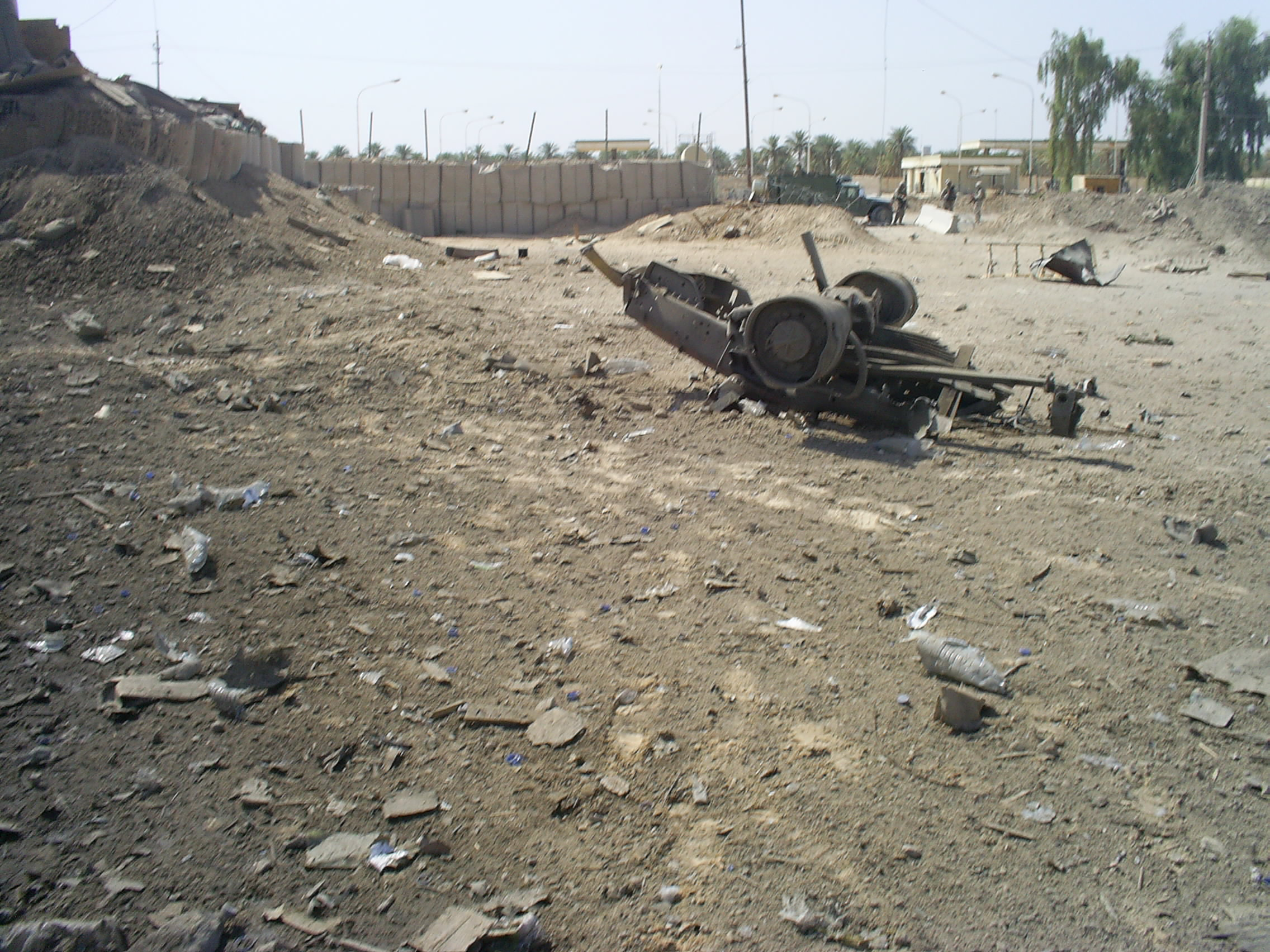
OP 2A after SVBIED Attack

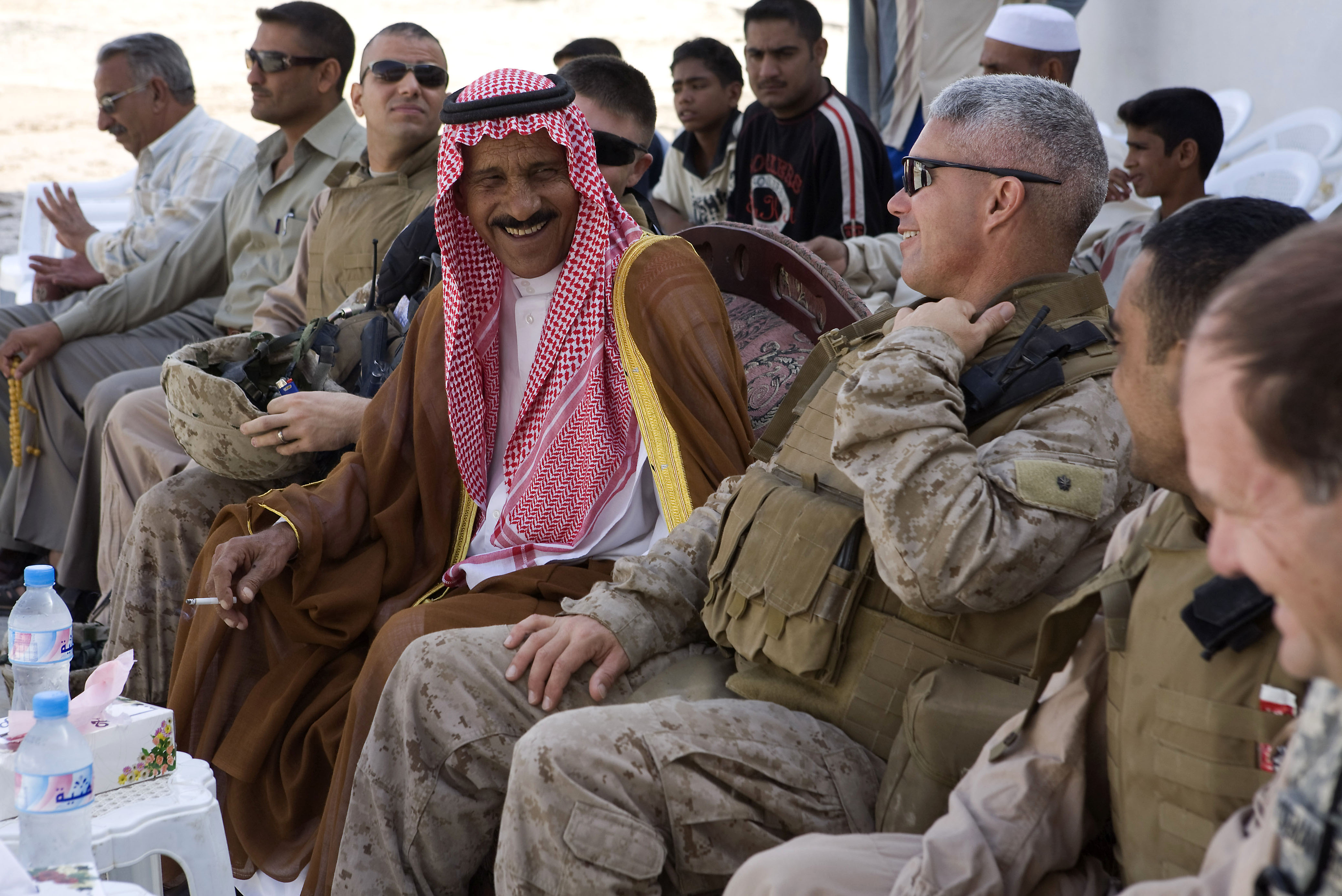
A sheik from the Shohabi tribe and Lt. Col. Andrew Milburn, talk about the Shohabi Boys and Girls primary school reopening and progress in the area. October 5, 2008

On July 8 of that year, an IED struck a US convoy, followed by insurgent mortar attacks on the damaged convoy, resulting in "many" casualties.

In August 2005, the Marines in Karmah were reinforced by the 1st Battalion, 4th Brigade, 1st Iraqi Division New Iraqi Army, which was variously posted at Camp India (near Abu Ghraib prison), OP 2, 2A, Delta, and 3 that was partnered with American combat advisors from the 98th Division and (after August 2005) 80th Division, who were commanded by then-LTC Douglas F Anderson. The combat advisor teams (10-15 men per each battalion and brigade headquarters) were called "MiTTs," which is short for Military Transition Team. This was part of the "Iraqification" of the Fallujah Area of Responsibility that was under then-Marine Col. David H. Berger (future Commandant of the Marine Corps), then-Marine COL Joseph Osterman, the future commander of United States Marine Forces Special Operations Command.

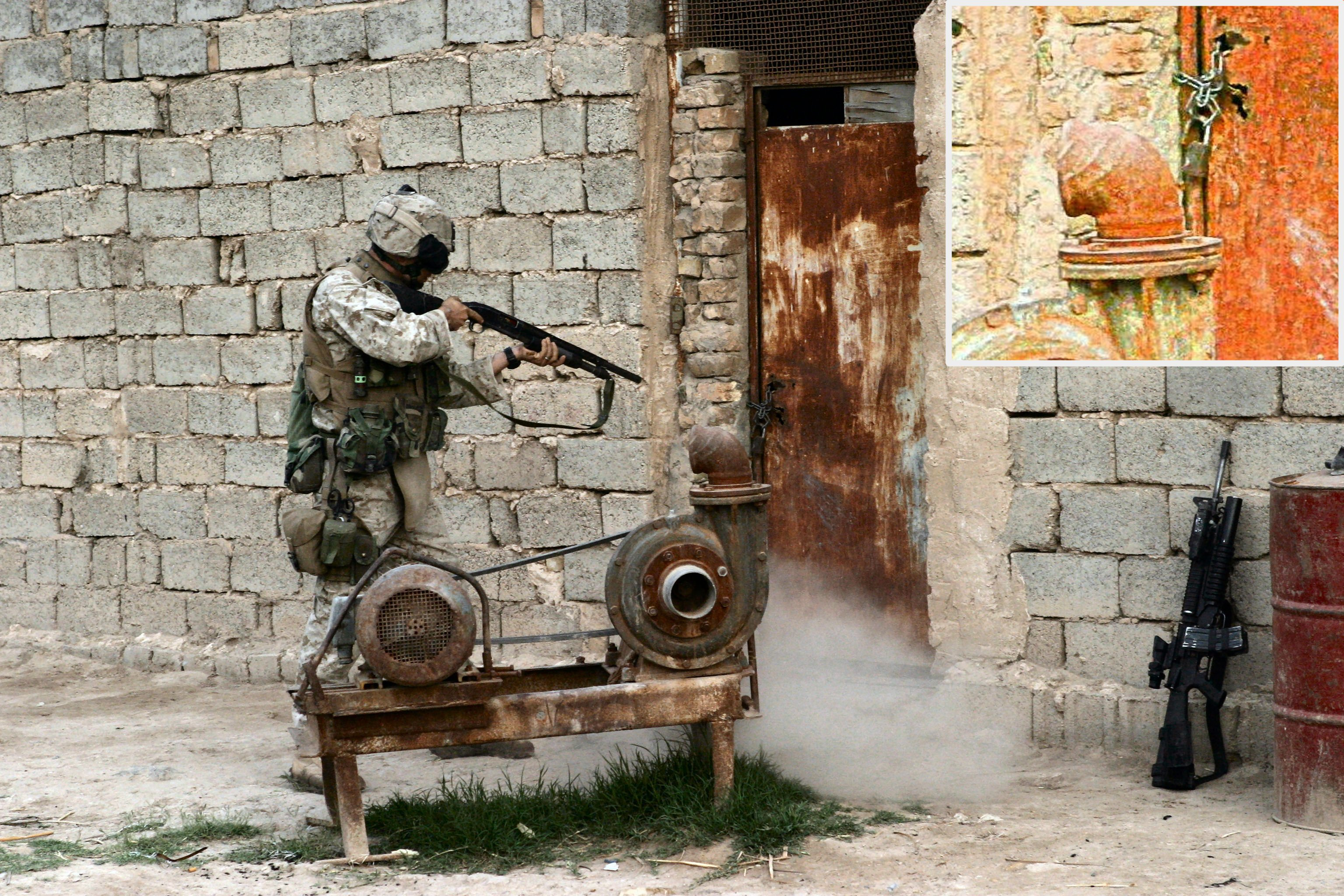
A Mossberg 590 being used by a US Marine for door breaching in Karmah in 2005.

On October 6, 2005 a Marine convoy from 2nd Battalion, 2nd Marines, Golf Company, Weapons platoon was struck by an IED, killing four Marines, LCpl Patrick B. Kenny, LCpl Jason L Frye, Cpl Nicholas O Cherava and Cpl Shayne M. Cabino and injuring three. Kenny being the first marine to die from Western Pennsylvania in Al Karma. Later that month, casualties increased among members of the Iraqi 4th Brigade, including two of its combat advisors from the 80th (Blue Ridge) Division, as they slowly took control of the battle space from 2-2 Marines. On Oct. 21, CPT Tyler Swisher and CPL Benny G. Cockerham III of 2-2 Marines were killed when their vehicle was struck by an improvised explosive device while they were traveling beside a canal.

In November 2005, the first Iraqi Police station was established in Karmah. It was met with violence from the local population, who strongly opposed any Coalition forces. The station was attacked by insurgents, causing the Iraqi Police to abandon the post. The station became an observation post for the Marines of 2nd Battalion, 2nd Marines, Golf Company, Weapons platoon. On November 19, 2005, an insurgent sniper shot and killed a Marine Lance Corporal standing post on the roof of the station. On December 24, 2005, the Marines of weapons platoon faced a substantial insurgent attack where part of the compound was destroyed from a hand-placed explosive device. A video of the attack was recovered from a dead insurgent and can be seen on the Internet. During the attack, a squad of Marines held off the insurgents for over 10 minutes until a vehicle-mounted Quick Reaction Force (QRF) arrived from nearby OP3.

By the end of 2005, Al-Karmah saw a greater presence of Iraqi Army and Iraqi Police. The violence continued, however, with many small-arms ambushes on foot and vehicle patrols, as well as IED attacks frequently utilizing combined arms and mortar attacks on the blast sites, causing multiple Iraqi Army casualties as well as a few combat advisors from the 80th Division. The average Iraqi Army mission consisted of six American advisors in two Up-Armored Humvees with fifteen Iraqis in three white Nissan pick-up trucks. They would patrol Route Michigan, which connected Abu-Gharib and Camp India with Fallujah, as well as the roads and villages around Al-Karmah, establish check points, conduct raids, ambushes, and sweeps, and co-opt the civilian population that was mixed Sunni-Shia Arab. Most raids against targeted insurgents were conducted at night. At this time, the large 4th Brigade, 1st Iraqi Division H.Q. and 3rd Battalion, 4th Brigade, 1st Iraqi Division, were posted at Camp India while 1st Battalion, 4th Brigade, 1st Iraqi Division remained posted in and around Karmah along with selected Marines from 1st Battalion, 1st Marines. The 2nd Battalion, 4th Iraqi Brigade remained in the southern part of Fallujah City. Members from SEAL Teams 3 and 5 cooperated with the Iraqi 4th Brigade while conducting combat operations in and around Karmah.

In January 2006, Bravo Company, 1st Battalion, 1st Marines, which replaced the departing 2-2 Marines, established itself in the Iraqi Police station in Al-Karmah and ran relentless patrols in pursuit of enemy insurgents. On April 8, 2006 Marine Lance Cpl. Philip Martini was killed by sniper fire in Al-Karmah. He was assigned to Bravo Company 1st Battalion, 1st Marines. Five days later, on April 13, Marine LCpl Stephen Perez, of San Antonio Texas, was killed in a mortar attack, along with Marine Cpl. Salem Bachar of Chula Vista California. Another 18 Marines were wounded in the attack. On May 23, 2006, Marines LCpl. Robert Posivio III and Pfc. Steven Freund were killed when a blast from an improvised explosive device struck their vehicle. On June 3, 2006 Marine Cpl. Ryan Cummings was killed when an improvised explosive device struck his vehicle.

By Spring 2006, the entire Iraqi 4th Brigade was posted in and around Karmah, with the 1st Battalion at Karmah, the 2nd Battalion to its east, and the 3rd Battalion and large Brigade H.Q. at Camp India at Nasser Wa-Salaam. The Fallujah Area of Responsibility, which controlled the Iraqi 4th Brigade, was now under Regimental Combat Team-5 under then-COL Lawrence D. Nicholson (who later commanded Task Force Leatherneck and the 2d Marine Expeditionary Brigade in Helmand Province while serving as Deputy Commander for Operations of the International Security Assistance Force in Afghanistan). In April 2006, OP 3 in Karmah, which was not far from the Police Station, was attacked by an "estimated 100 insurgents." According to the official history of 4-1 M.T.T.: "The 1st Battalion M.T.T. operated from O.P.s in and around Karmah to protect supply routes and disrupt infiltration into Fallujah. Our Soldiers lived in storage containers inside these barricaded compounds with the Iraqi soldiers. The battalion improved and their battle space grew immensely. In April 2006, O.P. 3, which was inside Karmah, came under attack from an estimated 100 insurgents. The Iraqi company manning the post did well in the defense. In a scene described as 'Blackhawk Down/Mogadishu intense,' the U.S.M.C. Quick Reaction Force reached the O.P. as the Iraqi company from 1-4-1 was running out of ammunition. An Iraqi captain [named Muhammed], trained by 80th Division advisors, was mortally wounded. Before dying he continued to fight and direct his soldiers to such a degree that the U.S.M.C. partner battalion commander said that if the Iraqi soldiers could receive U.S. heroism awards, he would have submitted the captain for a Navy Cross." To commemorate his sacrifice, O.P. 3 was thereafter called "O.P. Muhammed."

On May 11, 2006 seven U.S. service members died in Iraq, including four Marines who drowned when their tank rolled off a small engineer bridge near Al-Karmah.

In late 2006, during a sniper attack in Al-Karmah, a series of iconic photographs were taken by New York Times photographer João Silva and reporter C. J. Chivers. The attack involved Weapons Company, 2nd Battalion 8th Marines and Sgt. Jesse E. Leach, who became known as "The Iron Sergeant".

On December 25, 2006 three companies from the Army's 3/509th PIR 4th BCT (Airborne) 25th Infantry Division were moved from FOB Kalsu, to Al-Karmah. Able, Baker, and Blackfoot Company relieved Iraqi Police units from three outposts: OP Delta, OP Muhammed, and the Police Station. Two days after taking over OP Delta, their company commander was shot in the right arm on the first patrol out of the OP. Two days later, on December 30, 2006, Corporal Dustin Donica was killed by an insurgent sniper while building a fortification on the roof of OP Delta. Cpl. Donica was the 3,000th US service member killed in Iraq, and OP Delta would later be called Camp Donica.

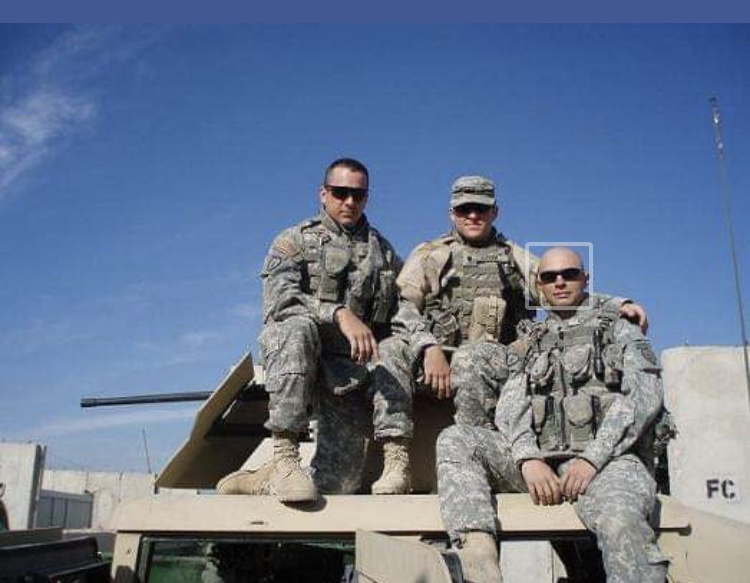

The 3/509th would go on to kill or capture a significant number of insurgents in the first half of 2007. Any surviving enemy had either left al-Karmah, or become mostly inactive by May/June 2007. The Paratroopers of the 509th paid a heavy price - Able Company alone taking 7 kia in Jan-Feb 2007. Overall the 3 Company's and HQ elements took between 25-30 killed or wounded in the first few months of 2007. On February 7, 2007, a US Marine CH-46E Sea Knight from HMM-364 was shot down by a shoulder-fired missile, killing all seven aboard. Three of the US Army Engineers of A Co. 321st Engineers sent to secure the wreckage were also killed by an IED. 13 days later, US forces raided a car bomb factory, where they discovered five vehicles, three 55-gallon barrels of chlorine, three barrels of nitroglycerine, artillery rounds and bombs. One man was detained, and the US stated that the factory was likely run by al-Qaeda. On March 17, insurgents attacked an army foot patrol, killing two. Eleven days later, a National Guard humvee was reported destroyed, with insurgents claiming all aboard were killed. Two days later, a less successful bomb destroyed a humvee, with no casualties. On April 2, another humvee was reported destroyed, with all aboard once again reported killed.

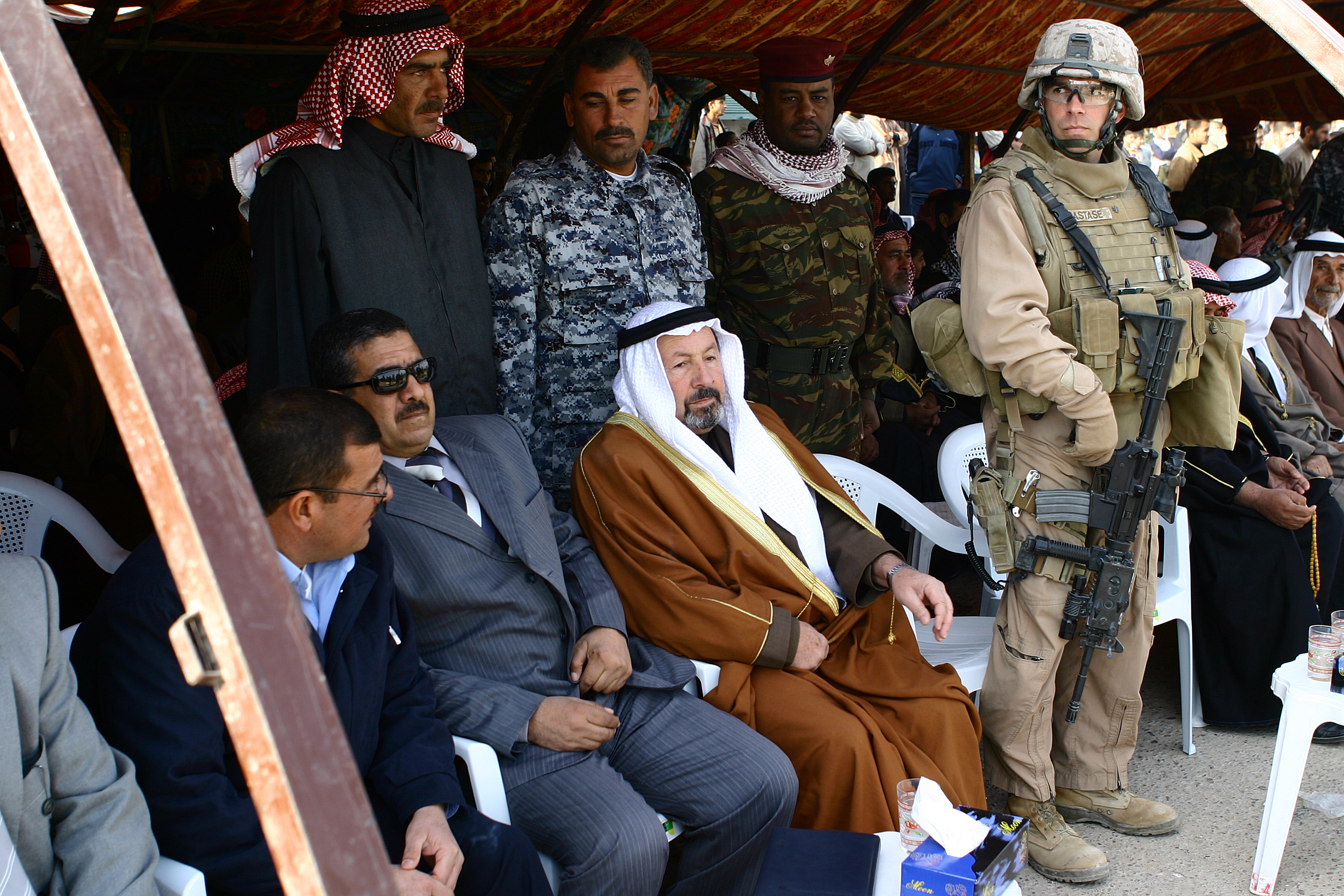
Lt. Col. Nathan Nastase with members of the Karmah city council in Iraq, 2007. Many of these individuals would be killed in June 2008 when a suicide bomber attacked the council.

On August 31, 2007, a safe house wired with explosives was destroyed in the city. It was believed to have been an arms cache and a launching point for mortars that had targeted the police station in Karma.

On May 2, 2008 four Marines were killed in a roadside blast in Lahib, a farming village just east of Karmah.

On June 26, 2008, three Marines from 2nd Battalion 3rd Marines (including the battalion's commanding officer), 20 Iraqi sheiks, the mayor of Karmah, and two interpreters were killed when a suicide bomber dressed as an Iraqi Policeman detonated an explosive vest at a meeting of tribal sheiks. The attack's aftermath was filmed by photojournalist Zoriah Miller.

On December 21, 2008, Lance Corporal Thomas J. Reilly with 1st Battalion 3rd Marine Regiment, C Company’s 2nd Platoon, was killed in action during a patrol in Karmah, Iraq. Five other Marines were injured.

On February 8, 2009, local police chief Lieutenant Col. Abd Al Salam was nearly killed by a 300-pound IED.

== ISIL control and recapture ==
In 2014, Karmah and the nearby city of Fallujah came under ISIL control. The Iraqi army and its allies had clashed with ISIL in Karmah for months, mainly during the Al-Karmah offensive in April and May 2015, and during the Anbar offensive of February 2016. On 23 May 2016 it was reported that the city was recaptured by Shiite militias of PMF during Operation Breaking Terrorism.
