= Peter S. Connor =

Peter Spencer Connor
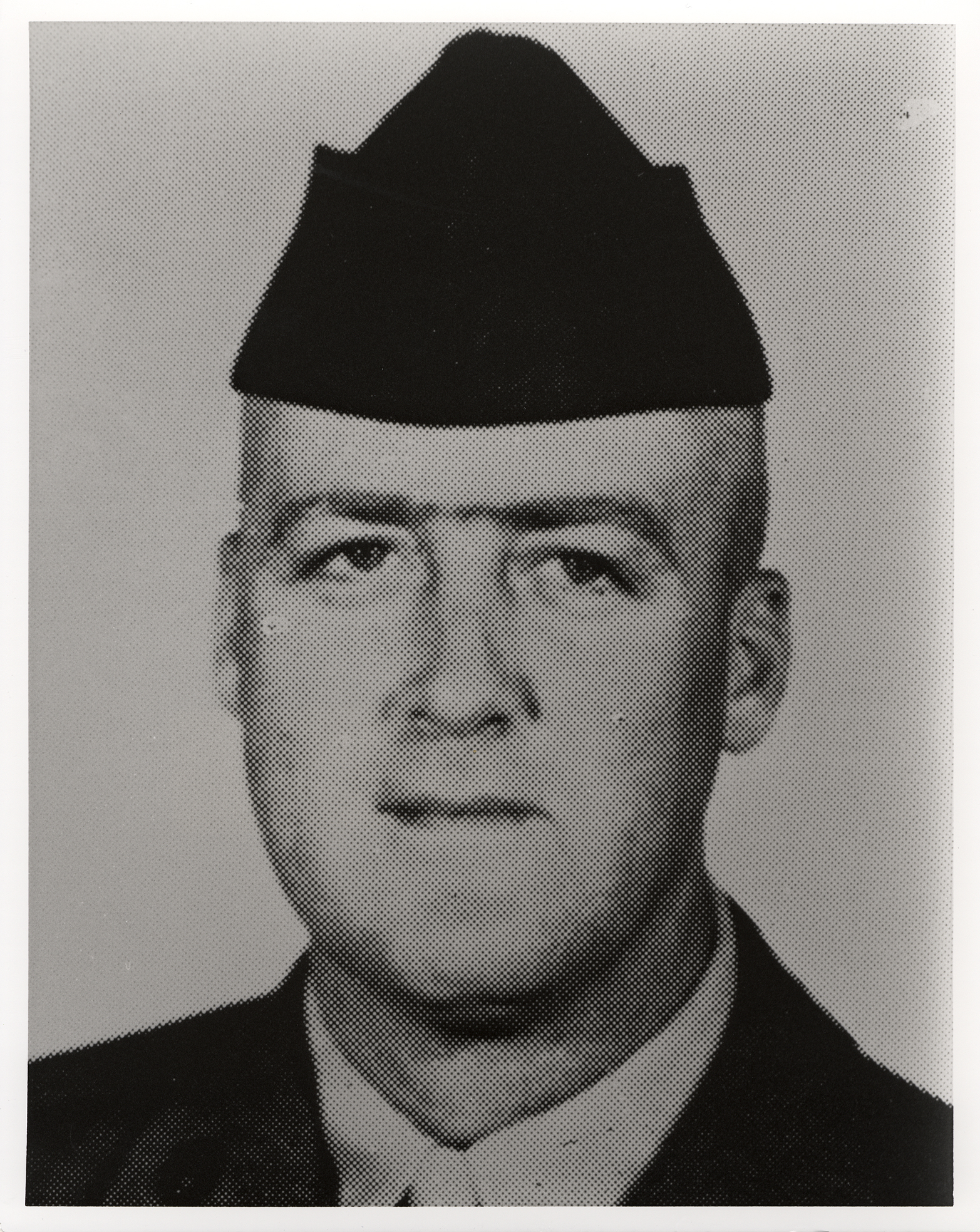
- Peter S. Connor, Medal of Honor recipient
- Born: September 4, 1932; South Orange, New Jersey, U.S.
- Died: March 8, 1966 (aged 33); USS Repose, off South Vietnam
- Burial place: Fort Rosecrans National Cemetery, San Diego, California
- Military career
- Allegiance: United States of America
- Branch: United States Marine Corps
- Service years: 1952–1966
- Rank: Staff Sergeant
- Units: Company F, 2nd Battalion, 3rd Marines, 1st Marine Division
- Conflicts: Korean War; Vietnam War (DOW)
- Awards: Medal of Honor (1966); Purple Heart

Peter Spencer Connor (September 4, 1932 – March 8, 1966) was a United States Marine Corps staff sergeant who posthumously received the Medal of Honor for absorbing the blast of his faulty-timered grenade rather than tossing it and risking nearby comrades in February 1966 in Vietnam.

== Biography ==
Connor was born on September 4, 1932, in Orange, New Jersey. He attended elementary and high school in South Orange, New Jersey, graduating from high school in 1950.

Enlisting in the U.S. Marine Corps on February 5, 1952, Connor completed recruit training with the 2nd Recruit Training Battalion, Marine Corps Recruit Depot Parris Island, South Carolina. He was promoted to private first class upon graduation from Recruit Training in April 1952, and transferred to the West Coast, where he joined the 2nd Battalion, 2nd Infantry Training Regiment. Connor finished his advanced infantry training and enlisted in the 1st Replacement Battalion.

Arriving in Korea in August 1952, Connor was assigned as a fire team leader and radioman in the Third Platoon, Company B, 1st Battalion, 5th Marines, 1st Marine Division. He was promoted to corporal in April 1953, while overseas.

Upon his return to the United States in October 1953, Corporal Connor served as a squad leader and platoon guide with Company B, 1st Battalion, 8th Marines, 2nd Marine Division at Camp Lejeune, North Carolina, until released from active duty on February 4, 1955.

While on inactive duty, Connor was a member of the Ready Reserve with the 4th and 1st Marine Corps Reserve and Recruitment Districts, and with 7th Rifle Company, United States Marine Corps Reserve, Lake Denmark, Dover, New Jersey. He was discharged from the Marine Corps Reserve in May 1961 to reenlist in the regular Marine Corps. Promoted to sergeant that same month, Connor was assigned as platoon guide with Casual Company, Headquarters Battalion, and with Company A, Schools Demonstration Troops, Marine Corps Schools, Quantico, Virginia.

Transferred to the West Coast in July 1962, Connor served as a platoon guide with Company B, 1st Battalion, 5th Marines, 1st Marine Division at Camp Pendleton. In November 1963, his unit was sent overseas and redesignated as Company F, 2nd Battalion, 3rd Marines, 3rd Marine Division. Connor served first as a platoon guide, but prior to the unit's return the next November, he was assigned as a platoon sergeant. Upon the unit's return to Camp Pendleton, it was redesignated as Company B, 1st Battalion, 1st Marines, 1st Marine Division. Connor was promoted to staff sergeant on May 1, 1965, and that August, his unit was again sent overseas, where it became a part of the 3rd Marine Division. Connor was transferred, while overseas, to Company F, 2nd Battalion, 3rd Marines, 3rd Marine Division and served as a platoon sergeant. He was serving with this unit when it was assigned to the 1st Marine Division in the Republic of Vietnam. It was during this period that Connor's actions earned him the Medal of Honor. Connor was wounded in action on February 25, 1966, and died of those wounds while on board the USS Repose on March 8, 1966.

== Medal of Honor citation ==
The President of the United States takes pride in presenting the MEDAL OF HONOR posthumously to

STAFF SERGEANT PETER S. CONNOR
UNITED STATES MARINE CORPS

for service as set forth in the following CITATION:

For conspicuous gallantry and intrepidity in action against enemy Viet Cong forces at the risk of his life above and beyond the call duty while serving as Platoon Sergeant of the Third Platoon, Company F, Second Battalion, Third Marines, Third Marine Division (Reinforced), Fleet Marine Force, in Quang Ngai Province, Republic of Vietnam on 25 February 1966. Leading his platoon on a search and destroy operation in an area made particularly hazardous by extensive cave and tunnel complexes, Sergeant Connor maneuvered his unit aggressively forward under intermittent enemy small-arms fire. Exhibiting particular alertness and keen observation, he spotted an enemy spider hole emplacement approximately fifteen meters to his front. He pulled the pin from a fragmentation grenade intending to charge the hole boldly and drop the missile into its depths. Upon pulling the pin he realized that the firing mechanism was faulty, and that even as he held the safety device firmly in place, the fuze charge was already activated. With only precious seconds to decide, he further realized that he could not cover the distance to the small opening of the spider hole in sufficient time, and that to hurl the deadly bomb in any direction would result in death or injury to some of his comrades tactically deployed near him. Manifesting extraordinary gallantry and with utter disregard for his personal safety, he chose to hold the grenade against his own body in order to absorb the terrific explosion and spare his comrades. His act of extreme valor and selflessness in the face of virtually certain death, although leaving him mortally wounded, spared many of his fellow Marines from death or injury. His gallant action in giving his life in the cause of freedom reflects the highest credit upon the Marine Corps and the United States Naval Service.

/S/ LYNDON B. JOHNSON

== See also ==
- List of Medal of Honor recipients
- List of Medal of Honor recipients for the Vietnam War
