= 2008 Karmah bombing =

Terrorist attack in central Iraq

26 June 2008 Karmah bombing
- Location: Al-Karmah, Iraq
- Date: 26 June 2008 (UTC+3)
- Target: Tribal Sheik meeting
- Attack type: Suicide bombing
- Deaths: 25
- Injuries: Unknown
- Perpetrator: Islamic State of Iraq

The 26 June 2008 Karmah bombing was a suicide attack on a meeting of tribal sheiks in the town of Al-Karmah. Three Marines from 2nd Battalion 3rd Marines (including the battalion's commanding officer), as well as twenty Iraqi sheiks and the mayor of Karmah, were killed when a suicide bomber dressed as an Iraqi Policeman detonated an explosive vest. Two interpreters were also killed in the blast(Ray and David). The aftermath of the attack was captured on film by photojournalist Zoriah Miller. The commanding officer of 2/3, LtCol Max Galeai and two other Marines (Captain Philip J. Dykeman and Cpl. Marcus W. Preudhomme) from the battalion were killed. In June 2008, it was announced that Anbar would be the tenth province to transfer to Provincial Iraqi Control, the first Sunni Arab region to be handed back. This handover was delayed due to the attack. The handover did occur on September 1, 2008. Two insurgents linked to the bombing were later caught in Tamariya.
