= Operation Meade River =

Part of the Vietnam War (1968)

- Part of Vietnam War
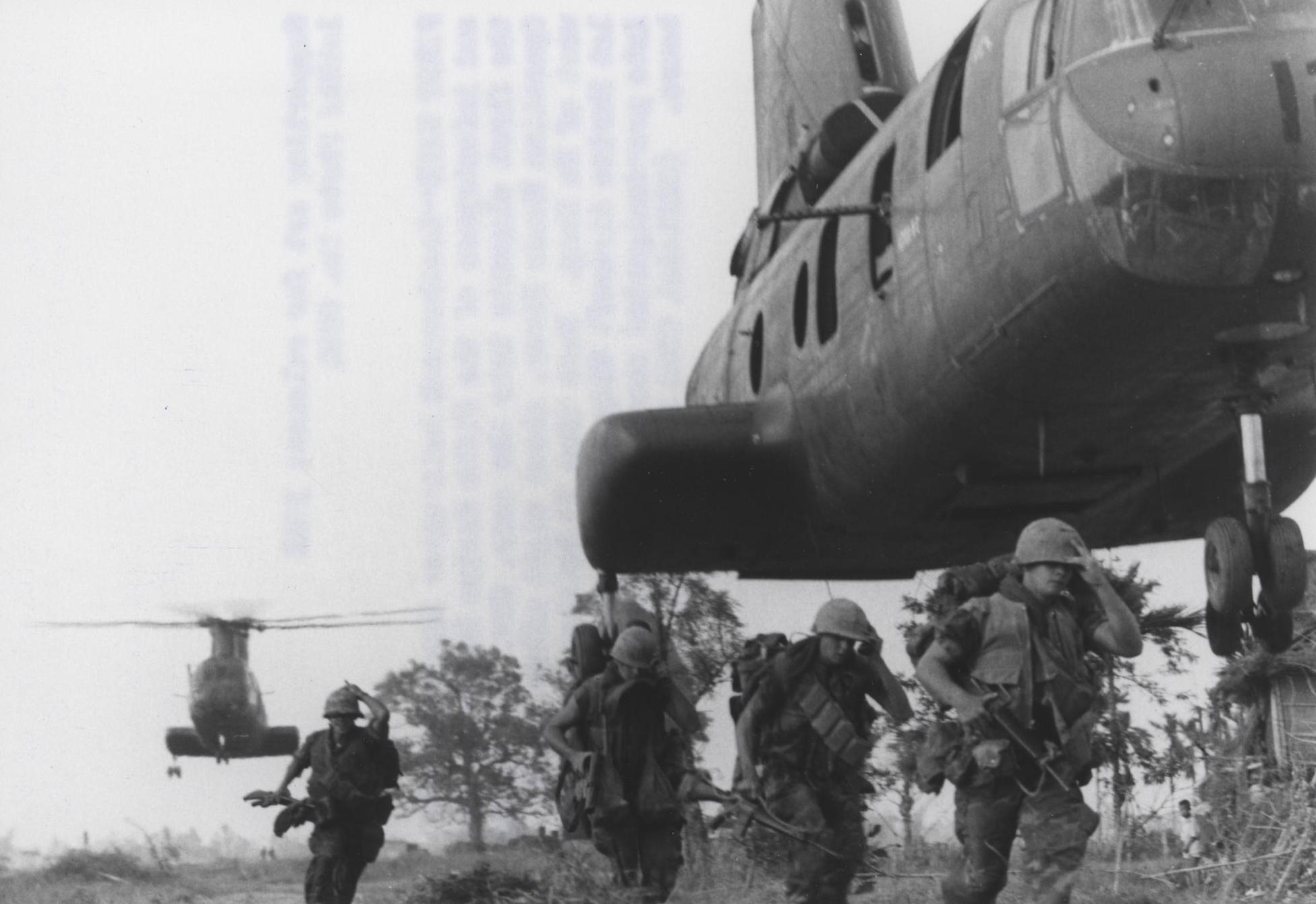
- Marines of the 5th Marine Regiment deploy by helicopter to begin the operation
Date	20 November – 9 December 1968
Location	Dodge City, Quảng Nam Province, South Vietnam 15.9°N 108.2°E
Result	U.S. claims victory

Belligerents
United States; South Vietnam	Viet Cong; North Vietnam

Commanders and leaders
MG Carl A. Youngdale	

Units involved
(United States) 1st Marine Division; 1st Battalion, 1st Marines; 2nd Battalion, 5th Marines; 3rd Battalion, 5th Marines; 1st Battalion, 7th Marines; 2nd Battalion, 7th Marines; 2nd Battalion, 26th Marines; 3rd Battalion, 26th Marines; B Co 1st Battalion 5th Marines (South Vietnam) 4th Cavalry Regiment	R-20 Battalion (North Vietnam) 1st Battalion, 36th Regiment

Casualties and losses
(United States) 108 killed	US body count: 1,023 killed 123 captured

Operation Meade River was a US Marine Corps cordon and search operation that took place south of Danang, lasting from 20 November to 9 December 1968.

== Background ==
Dodge City was a 36 square km area located approximately 20 km south of Danang to the west of Highway 1 and given this nickname by the Marines due to frequent ambushes and firefights there; together with Go Noi Island directly to the south it was a Vietcong and People's Army of Vietnam (PAVN) stronghold and base area. The Dodge City area was completely flat and criss-crossed with numerous small waterways. Dodge City was the base for the Vietcong R-20 Battalion and the PAVN 1st Battalion, 36th Regiment.

The operation was planned as part of the South Vietnamese Government's Le Loi Accelerated Pacification Campaign and called for the 1st Marine Regiment to cordon and search the entire Dodge City area.

== Operation ==
On the morning of 20 November 7 Marine Battalions moving overland and by helicopter established the cordon meeting light resistance losing 1 Marine killed and 25 wounded and 2 helicopters shot down. Two towers were flown into the northern area of the cordon and these would be used by snipers and for directing artillery and air support. At midday 2nd Battalion, 7th Marines began sweeping from the western side of the cordon towards the railway lines and at 16:30 Company G 2/7 Marines encountered a PAVN bunker complex in an area nicknamed the "Horseshoe" (15.893°N 108.18°E), the Marines withdrew leaving behind 6 dead.

On the morning of 21 November 2/7 Marines, supported by Company D 1st Battalion, 1st Marines and Company L 3rd Battalion, 26th Marines planned to resume their assault on the Horseshoe but were hit by intense fire before they had moved into position and the attack stalled.

2/7 Marines attacked the Horseshoe again on 22 November. Company E was hit by close-range fire as it crossed a small stream losing 7 killed and 23 wounded in 10 minutes before it could withdraw. Company D 1/1 Marines attacked from the north losing 2 dead and 17 wounded before disengaging.

On the morning of 23 November 3/26 Marines moved from the southwest of the cordon towards the Horseshoe joining up with 2/7 Marines. Company H, 2/7 Marines overran several enemy positions and recovered the bodies of the 6 Marines lost on 20 November.

On 24 November air and artillery strikes were directed against the Horseshoe and then in the afternoon 2/7 Marines reinforced by Company K, 3/26 Marines attacked again. At 15:30 the assault was stopped by strong enemy fire and by 18:30 the Marines withdrew again having lost 5 dead and 31 wounded.

On the morning of 25 November after preparatory artillery fire 2/7 Marines moved forward encountering no resistance as the defending PAVN 3rd Battalion, 36th Regiment had withdrawn.

Over the next 4 days the Marines reduced and searched the cordon area. From midnight on 28/29 November a 6-hour artillery barrage hit the cordon area and then the 3rd Battalion, 5th Marines attacked along Route 4 clearing out numerous small bunkers and defensive positions.

On 1 December 3/5 Marines encountered a strong enemy bunker position in an area nicknamed the "Hook" (15.8925°N 108.207°E) losing 2 dead and 28 wounded before pulling back to allow artillery and air support to attack the enemy positions. 3/5 Marines attacked again on 2 December, but made no progress. On 3 December 3/26 Marines joined the attack on the Hook and after an extensive air and artillery bombardment succeeded in penetrating the defensive positions by the evening of 4 December. On 5 December after a napalm attack the Marines overran the remaining defenses finding 75-100 PAVN dead.

On 6 December Company E, 2/26 Marines encountered a PAVN bunker complex nicknamed the "Northern Bunker Complex" just south of the La Tho River (15.91°N 108.2°E). On 7 December 3/26 Marines, Company H, 5th Marines and Company A, 7the Marines attacked the complex, quickly becoming pinned down and losing 10 dead and 23 wounded. The Marines withdrew into night defensive positions to allow for air and artillery strikes.

At 11:20 on 8 December 3/26 Marines supported by 12 M113s from the ARVN 2nd Troop, 4th Cavalry attacked the Northern Bunker Complex finding 79 dead PAVN from the previous day's fighting. Company H was pinned down by a final line of bunkers, but the Marines used an improvised explosive device to destroy a large bunker and counted a further 39 PAVN dead in the defensive lines. Company A overran another bunker line clearing 12 bunkers and killing 47 PAVN and later engaged in a firefight with another PAVN unit killing 20 PAVN for the loss of 6 Marines. Company L engaged a PAVN platoon killing 15 PAVN for the loss of 5 Marines. As night fell Company I's lead Platoon was cut off and Sergeant Karl Taylor led a mission to rescue the wounded Marines, in addition to rescuing several wounded he silenced a PAVN machine gun position before being mortally wounded. Sergeant Taylor would be posthumously awarded the Medal of Honor for his actions.

On 9 December following an artillery bombardment (including fire from the USS New Jersey) the Marines began their final assault on the Northern Bunker Complex methodically destroying the PAVN positions, finding over 130 dead in the bunkers and taking 8 prisoners.

== Aftermath ==
Operation Meade River concluded on 9 December 1968; the Marines had suffered 108 dead and 510 wounded, and claimed that the PAVN/Vietcong lost 1,023 killed and 123 captured. The Marines destroyed more than 360 bunkers during the operation. Despite their losses, intelligence showed that by late December the Vietcong and PAVN had returned to Dodge City.

== Gallery ==
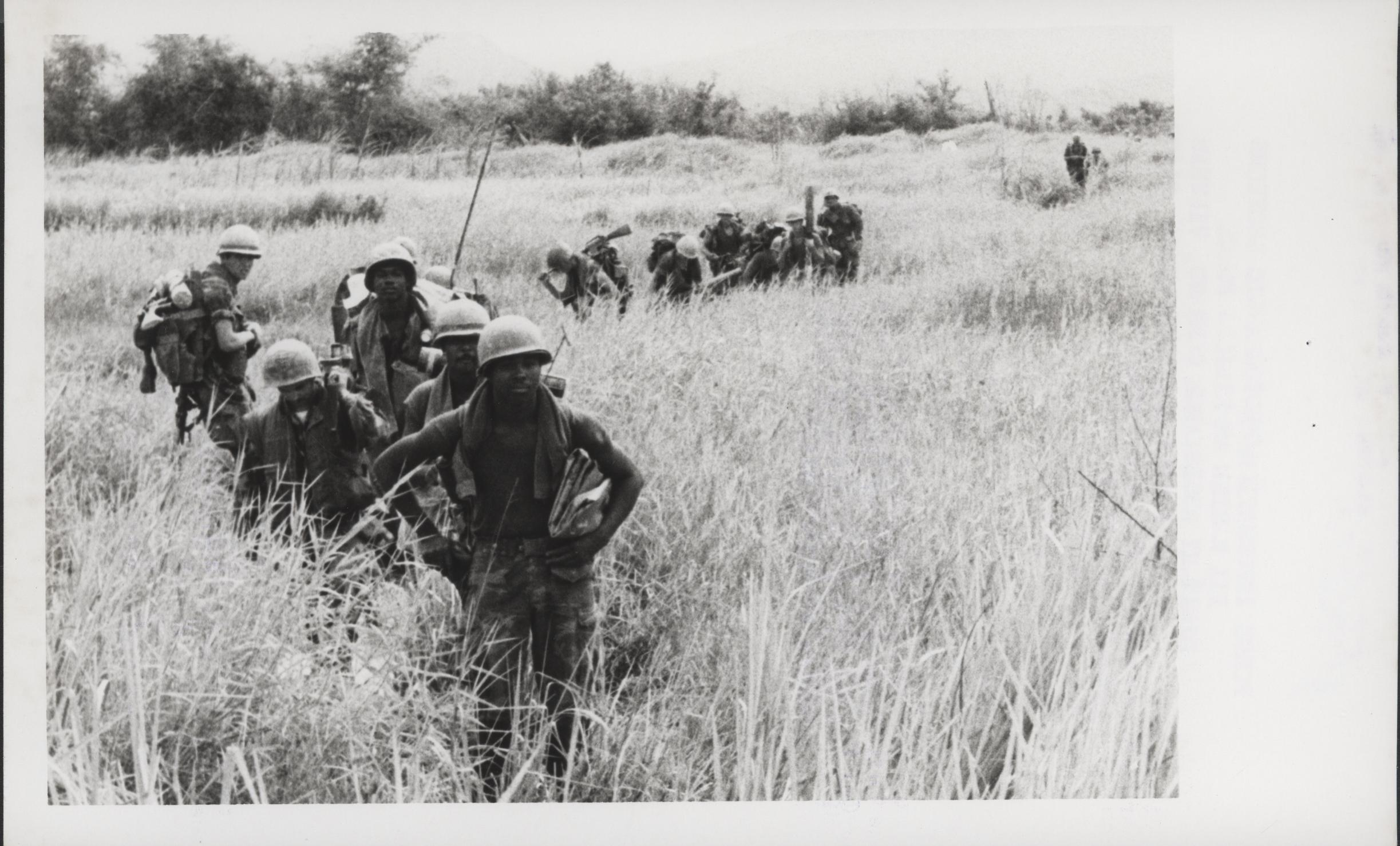
5th Marines sweep through elephant grass

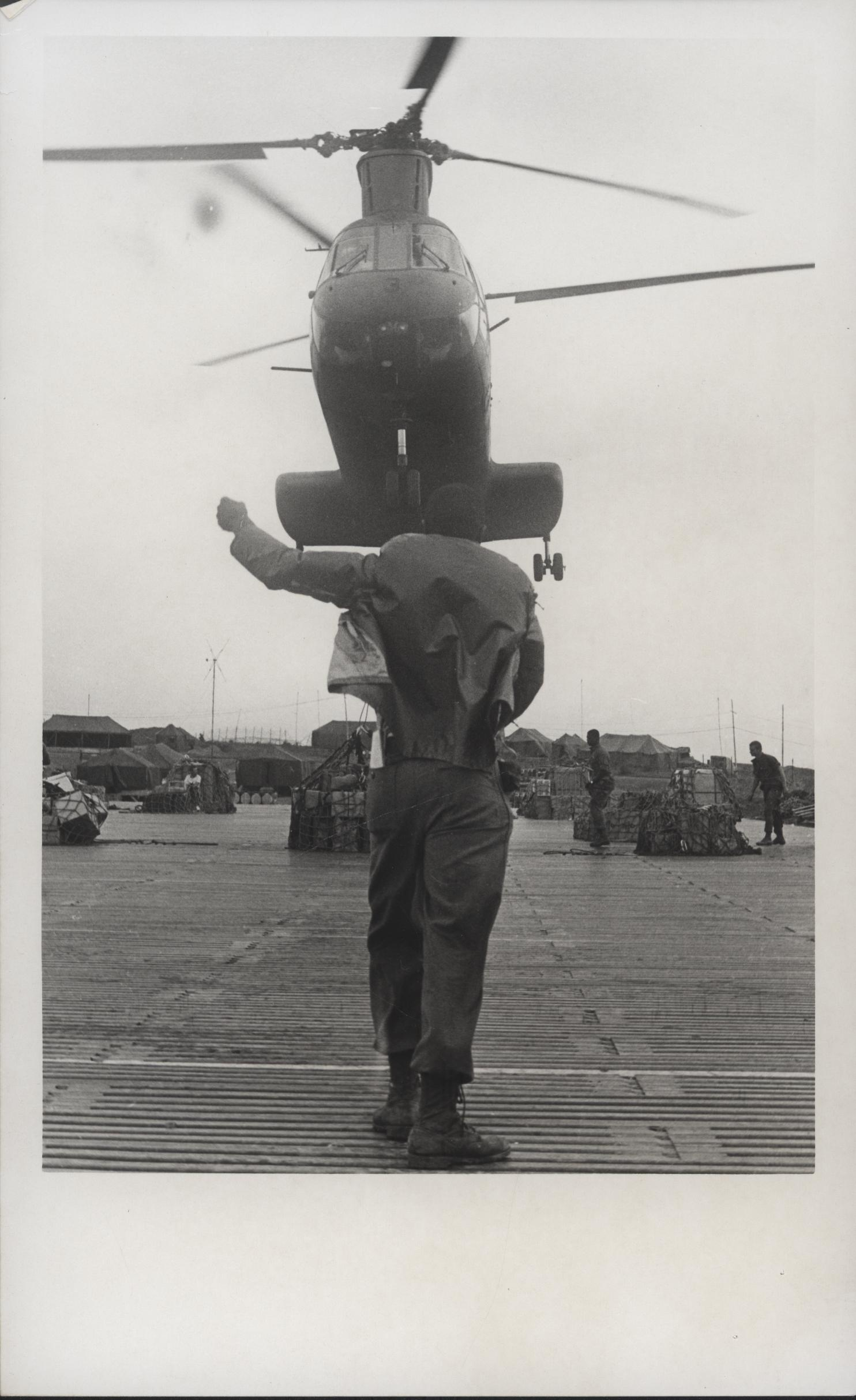
A Marine signals a CH-46 into position for a resupply hook-up at Hill 55

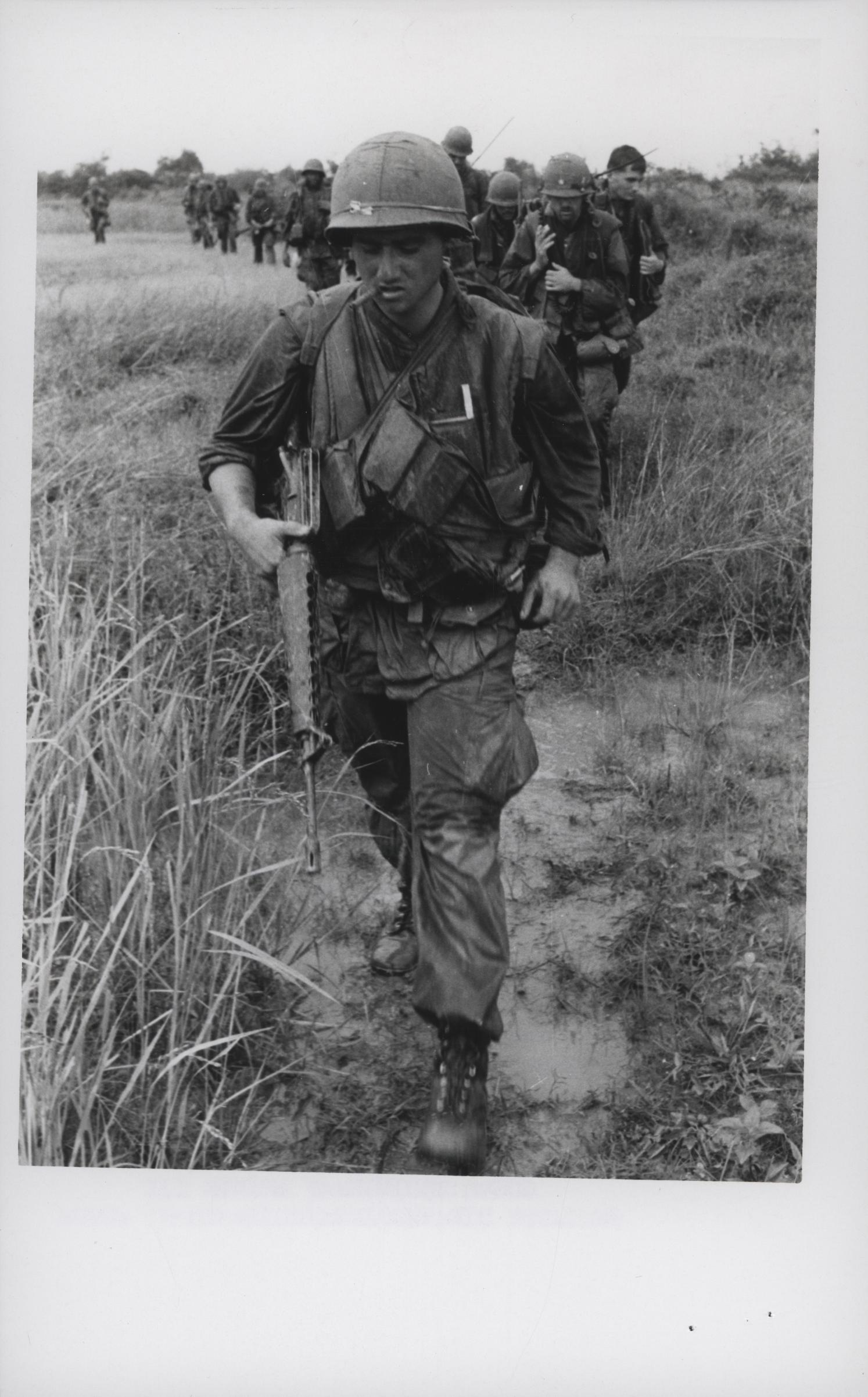
7th Marine Regiment patrol

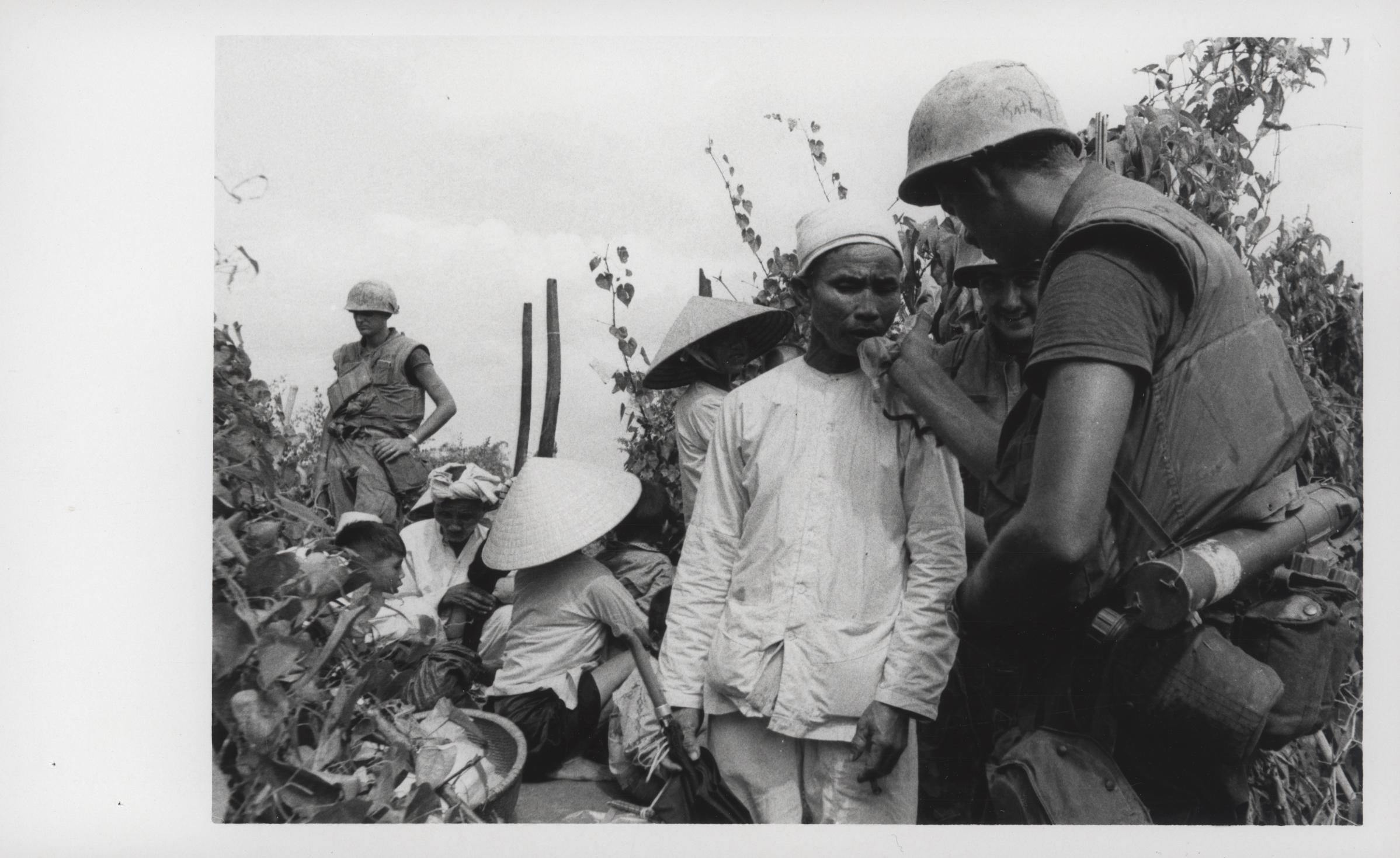
A Marine shares his radio with a civilian.

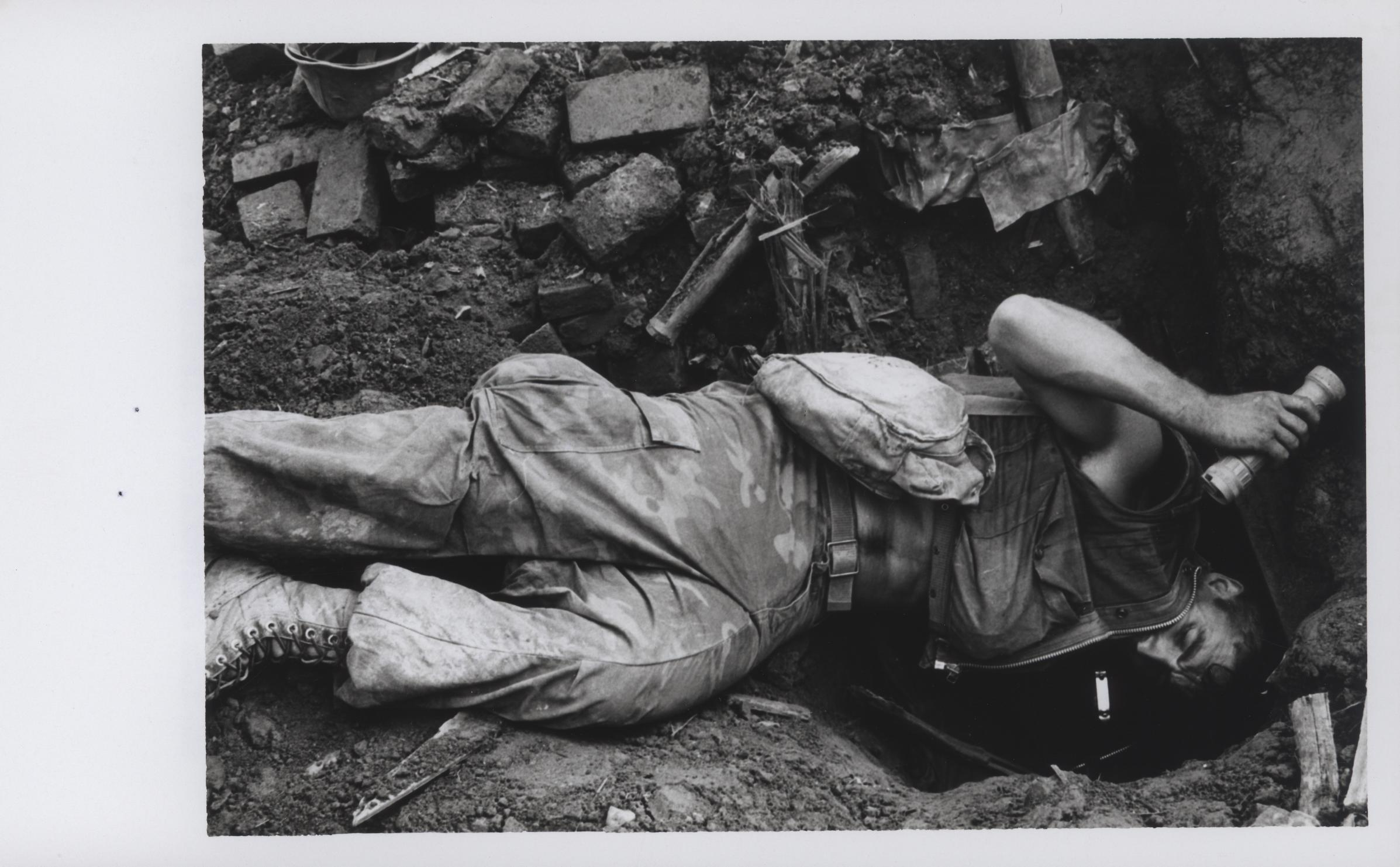
A Marine Tunnel Rat crawls into a captured North Vietnamese bunker

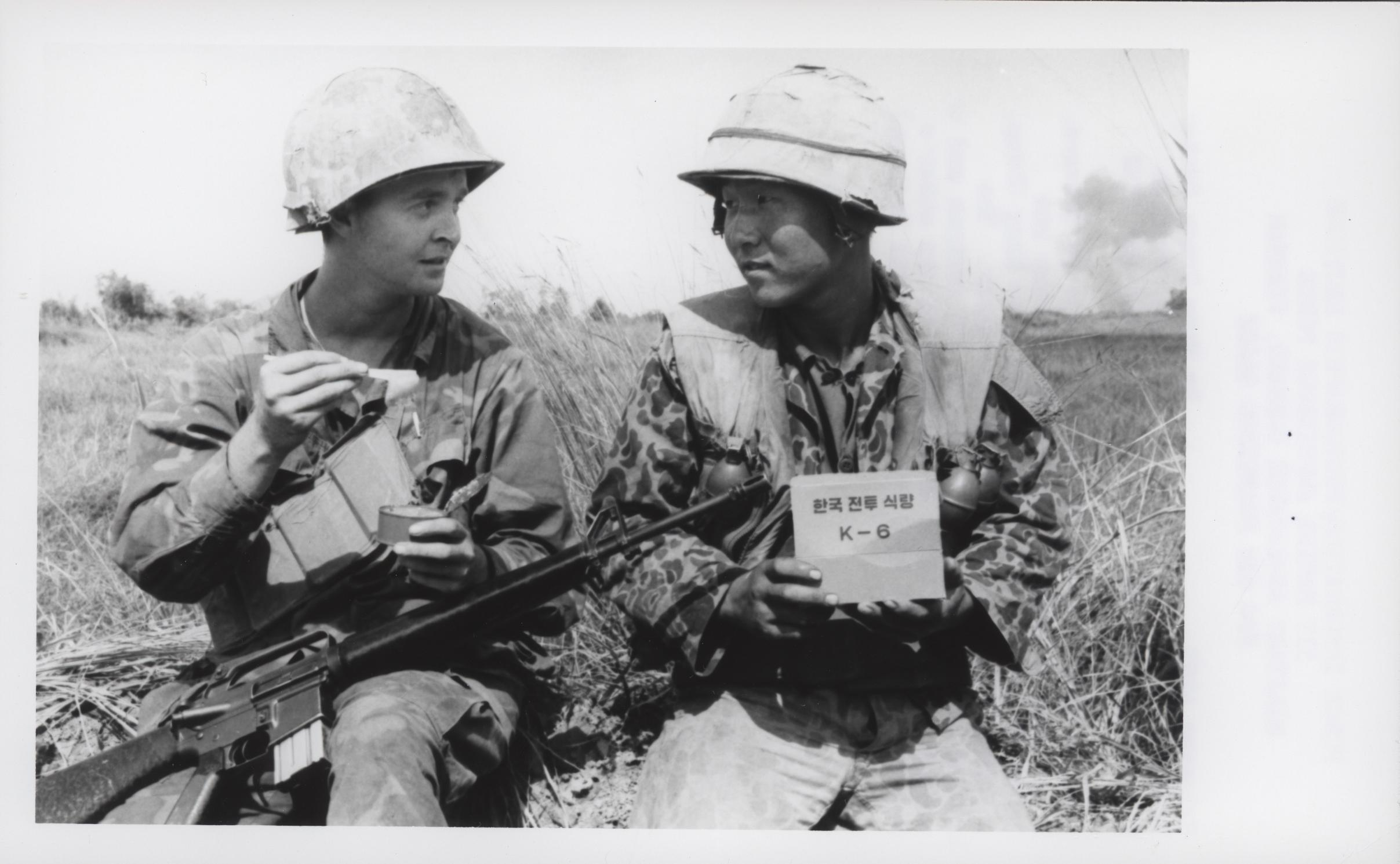
US and Korean Marines share Korean C-rations
