= Hector de Zayas =

USMC Navy Cross recipient

- Born: September 7, 1910; New York City, US
- Died: July 26, 1944 (aged 33) Guam, Mariana Islands
- Buried: Arlington National Cemetery
- Allegiance: United States of America
- Branch: United States Marine Corps
- Service years: 1932–1944
- Rank: Lieutenant Colonel
- Commands: 2nd Battalion, 3rd Marines
- Conflicts: World War II: Bougainville campaign; Battle of Guam †
- Awards: Navy Cross; Silver Star; Purple Heart

Hector de Zayas (September 7, 1910 – July 26, 1944) was a highly decorated United States Marine Corps lieutenant colonel. He was killed in action during the second battle of Guam in World War II and was posthumously awarded the Navy Cross.

== Early life and career ==
Hector de Zayas was born on September 7, 1910, in New York City. After graduating from Peekskill Military Academy, de Zayas was enrolled at the United States Naval Academy at Annapolis, Maryland. He was commissioned as a second lieutenant in the Marine Corps upon graduating with the class of 1932.

De Zayas then reported to The Basic School at Philadelphia, Pennsylvania. After graduating from The Basic School in April 1933, he reported to the Marine Barracks in Boston, Massachusetts. From late 1933 to mid-1934, de Zayas served aboard the USS New Mexico before a brief assignment to the USS Richmond. By October 1934, he was assigned to the USS Trenton, serving on that ship until mid-1935.

De Zayas was then attached to the 1st Marine Brigade in Quantico, Virginia, remaining there until the end of 1936. In January 1937, he began attending the tank course at Fort Benning, Georgia. After graduating from the course that summer, he returned to the 1st Marine Brigade's newly activated 1st Tank Company in Quantico. That October, de Zayas assumed command of the company. While de Zayas was critical of the Marmon-Herrington CTL-3 tanks, characterizing them as unreliable, he remained in Quantico until 1939. Afterwards, he was stationed in China with Headquarters Company, 4th Marine Regiment, staying there until mid 1941.

== World War II ==
On December 7, 1941, the Japanese attacked Pearl Harbor, drawing the United States into World War II. De Zayas was soon afterwards assigned as the commanding officer of 2nd Battalion, 3rd Marines. In September 1942, de Zayas' regiment deployed to American Samoa and was assigned to the 2nd Marine Brigade. The 3rd Marines then moved to New Zealand to conduct combat training and in June 1943, the regiment was assigned to the 3rd Marine Division. The division then moved to Guadalcanal and conducted mock amphibious landings at Efate.

=== Bougainville campaign ===
On November 1, 1943, the 3rd Marine Division assaulted Bougainville. Landing at Blue Beach 2, Lieutenant Colonel de Zayas' battalion was the first to reach the island and faced little resistance from the defending Japanese. On November 20, de Zayas led 2/3 in breaking an enemy roadblock on the Numa-Numa Trail, discovering a 400-foot ridge. He then ordered one of his company commanders to take the ridge. A platoon led by First Lieutenant Steve J. Cibik moved ahead of the battalion, holding the ridge against several counterattacks for the next four days.

De Zayas' battalion was crossing the Piva River on November 21 when the Marines were pinned down by heavy fire from a Japanese bunker complex. De Zayas moved forward to personally direct the fire of his Marines before leading part of his unit around the enemy position. De Zayas then encountered an enemy battalion supporting the bunker system, and was able to withdraw his men with minimal casualties. The information de Zayas gathered on the bunker system during this action was instrumental in destroying the bunkers.

On November 24, de Zayas led his Marines forward 250 yards under heavy fire, taking heavy casualties while crossing a meandering stream eight times. The battle of Piva Forks concluded the next day. For his actions during the battle, de Zayas was awarded the Silver Star. On December 25, the 3rd Marines left Bougainville and returned to Guadalcanal.

=== Battle of Guam ===
On July 21, 1944, de Zayas led his battalion ashore at Red Beach One near Adelup Point during the battle of Guam. De Zayas attempted to lead his Marines up over the ridge overlooking the beach between Chonito Cliff and Bundschu Ridge, but fierce enemy resistance kept his entire regiment pinned down. Company E was able to take the high ground by the end of the day, but only after the Japanese had withdrawn. De Zayas' battalion spent the entire next day continuously engaging the enemy.

On July 25, 2/3 punched through enemy cave defenses on the drive toward Fonte Ridge. That night and into the next morning, his battalion helped to repulse multiple Japanese banzai attacks. Both sides took heavy casualties. By dawn, de Zayas learned of the potential of a second enemy attack and moved to the front lines to reposition his men. While he was in this exposed forward position, de Zayas was shot and killed by a Japanese sniper. The executive officer of 2/3, Major William A. Culpepper, assumed command for the remainder of the battle.

De Zayas was posthumously awarded the Navy Cross and a road leading to the 3rd Marine Regiment's command post on Guam was named "De Zayas Road." He was buried in Arlington National Cemetery.

== See also ==
- List of Navy Cross recipients for World War II
