= Al-Karmah offensive =

2015 military operation in the Iraq war

- Part of the War in Iraq
- Location of the Al Anbar Governorate in Iraq
Date	14 April – 3 May 2015 (2 weeks and 5 days)
Location	Al-Karmah, Anbar Governorate, Iraq 33.399722°N 43.908889°E
Result	Limited ISF gains: Iraqi security forces capture part of Al-Karmah

Belligerents
Iraq; United States; Air support: United Kingdom; Canada	Islamic State

Commanders and leaders
(Iraq) Haider al-Abadi (Iraq) Ahmed al-Dulaimi (United States) Barack Obama (United Kingdom) David Cameron (Canada) Stephen Harper	Abu Waheeb (IS Commander in Anbar); Abu Khattab † (IS Wilayat al-Jazira governor); Abu Qatada † (senior IS commander); Abu Azam † (senior IS commander)

Units involved
Iraqi Army; 7th Division; Iraqi Air Force; Special Operations Forces; Iraqi Police; al-Hashd al-Shaabi; Shia militias; Sunni tribal fighters; (United States) US Armed Forces; Royal Air Force; Royal Canadian Air Force	Military of the Islamic State: Wilayat al-Anbar

Strength
(Iraq) Unknown number of Iraqi soldiers; 10,000+ Sunni tribal fighters	Several thousand

Casualties and losses
Unknown	676+ killed (government claim)
- Location within Iraq

The Al-Karmah offensive, codenamed Fajr al-Karma, was an offensive launched by the Iraqi Army and anti-IS Sunni tribal fighters to recapture the Al-Karmah district taken by the Islamic State in Iraq. The offensive began on 14 April 2015. During the offensive the anti-IS forces captured part of the city of Al-Karmah, and the old road of Al-Karmah.

In response to the Iraqi state offensive, IS launched a counterattack in the region, attacking Ramadi, capturing three nearby villages on 15 April, and taking control of the Tharthar Dam on 24 April. By 15 May IS had taken control over the Iraqi government headquarters in Ramadi.

The IS attack on Ramadi prompted 114,000 people to flee the region, according to UN officials, increasing the total number of refugees from Anbar since 2014 to over 400,000 people.

== Background ==
The Anbar Province in western Iraq is the country's largest and most sparsely populated province. Most of the population live in the major cities, like Ramadi and Fallujah, and almost everyone else in the region lives within a short distance of the Euphrates River, which snakes from Baghdad through the Syrian Border.

The largely Sunni population in Anbar was a stronghold for the Iraqi resistance during the US occupation of Iraq (2003–2011). After the Fallujah killings of April 2003 and the disbandment of the Iraqi army on 25 May 2003, many Sunni locals turned against the American occupiers. The disbandment put hundreds of thousands of Anbaris out of work as many were members of the Army or the party, and viewed its disbanding as an act of contempt towards the Iraqi people.

By 2004, the province was in full-scale revolt. Al-Qaeda in Iraq (AQI) became the province's main Sunni insurgent group, and turned the provincial capital of Ramadi into its stronghold. Several battles, like Battle of Ramadi (2004), First Battle of Fallujah (April 2004), Second Battle of Fallujah (November–December 2004), Second Battle of Ramadi (2006), ravaged the region as the Iraqi insurgents struggled against the American occupiers for control of Anbar. During the first four years of Operation Iraqi Freedom, the Anbar Province was the deadliest province for American service members, claiming approximately one-third of American fatalities. Part of its significance came from the fact that the western Euphrates River Valley served as an important infiltration route for foreign fighters headed to Iraq's heartland from Syria.

In August 2006, several tribes located near Ramadi, led by Sheikh Abdul Sattar Abu Risha, revolted against AQI. The tribes launched the Anbar Awakening and helped turn the tide against the insurgents. American and Iraqi tribal forces regained control of Ramadi in early 2007, as well as other cities such as Hīt, Haditha, and Rutbah. In June 2007, the US turned its attention to eastern Anbar Province and secured the cities of Fallujah and Al-Karmah.

After the withdrawal of US troops from Iraq in 2011, the region was in 2014 run over by ISIL forces making Anbar their stronghold in Iraq. By late June 2014, at least 70% of the Anbar Province was under ISIL control, including the cities of Fallujah, Al-Qa'im, Abu Ghraib, and half of Ramadi.

Map showing the situation in Anbar, in June 2014

As a response to the ISIL takeover, the Iraqi government, in coordination with American and Iranian forces, launched an international campaign against ISIL, which includes the Anbar offensive. At the onset of the offensive, the Iraqi Government's only foothold in the densely populated part of the province was in Ramadi, the capital of the Anbar Province, while ISIL militants controlled the outskirts of the city, as well as the majority of the region.

== Government forces ==
The Anbar offensive is a broad coalition of different fighting forces officially led by the government's Iraqi Security Forces (ISF) They are assisted by Hashed al-Shaabi (or Popular Mobilisation Brigades), an Iraqi government-controlled umbrella group mainly composed of volunteer Shiite militias, but which also has incorporated hundreds of Sunni fighters. The brunt of the fighting in Anbar has been done by Iraqi police forces backed by local wealthy Sunni tribes who have been reluctant to permit the ISF or the Shiite brigades entering Ramadi because of the historical animosity between the Sunni and the Shia.

Initially it was reported that 10,000 Sunni tribal fighters would join the Iraqi government forces. By 9 May, 1,000 tribal recruits had joined the Iraqi forces at their base in Amiriyat al-Fallujah, for a new estimated potential total of "as many as 6,000" tribal fighters.

The Iraqi forces also received air support from Operation Inherent Resolve, a US-led coalition operation against IS in Syria and Iraq which has operated in Anbar since October 2014. Australia, Belgium, Canada, Denmark, France, Jordan, the Netherlands, the United Kingdom's RAF and the United States have all flown bombing missions in Operation Inherent Resolve.

== The offensive ==
After the advances made by the Iraqi government forces in the Second Battle of Tikrit, the Iraqi Prime Minister Haider al-Abadi announced, on 8 April 2015, an offensive to remove IS from the Anbar Province. The next day, in response to the announced offensive, IS executed 300 people in Anbar Province.

The offensive itself started on 14 April, after IS launched an assault against Ramadi, prompting 114,000 people to flee the region, according to UN officials. The IS attack on Ramadi was part of the militant's refocusing of their efforts on Anbar, after they lost the Iraqi city of Tikrit, in the Second Battle of Tikrit. An Iraqi TV channel also reported that IS "started a large-scale operation" to capture the areas around Ramadi, and tried to seize the highway leading to Ramadi "to cut off supplies". The Pentagon officers did not pay heed to the "warnings" that the group were "poised to seize" the city. The day before, the Iraqi Anbar Governor Anbar Suhaib al-Rawi survived an assassination attempt by IS in the city of Ramadi.

On 15 April, it was reported that IS had executed 300 more Sunni tribesmen in Anbar over the past few days, as it captured three villages to the east of Ramadi.

The Iraqi government offensive made little headway the first weeks before they started making gains around the city of Al-Karmah, close to Fallujah, at the end of April.

On 23 April, Iraqi government forces secured the old road of Al-Karmah and three days later retook part of Al-Karmah.

During the offensive several RAF air missions provided air support for Iraqi troops using both RAF Tornado GR4s and remotely piloted RAF Reapers. In Anbar Province they have operated close to Ramadi, and ahead of Iraqi advances near Al-Karmah. They have removed IS roadblocks and ambushes, taken out IS snipers, and blown up IS IED teams, VBIEDs, heavy vehicles, and fighters.

== See also ==
- Battle of Ramadi (2014–2015)
- Salahuddin campaign
