= Zoriah Miller =

American photographer (born 1976)

Zoriah Miller (born January 27, 1976), or simply Zoriah, is an American photojournalist and war photographer. He claims to have worked for international aid organizations such as the Red Cross Although claiming to have contributed photos to photo agencies World Picture News, The Image Works, Reporters Agency, and Rapport Press, Miller remains independent and produces his photo stories on a freelance basis.

Miller's images of conflict in Iraq have been published in relation to a controversy where he was kicked out of embed with US forces when he was accused of violating the terms of his embedding by taking pictures of dead and injured soldiers and thereby "[providing the] enemy with an after-action report on the effectiveness of their attack and on the response procedures of U.S. and Iraqi forces". Photographs that he took in Iraq of dead US Marines after a suicide bomber in Al-Karmah that he posted on his website were discussed on the online forum 'Lightstalkers' followed by a mention in a couple of articles.

== Publication ==
A photograph of his showing one result of the 2004 Indian Ocean tsunami was published by Newsweek.

== Photography ==
Miller says he specializes in documenting humanitarian crises

In a one-hour television program, as part of the In Harm's Way series about different dangerous professions produced by Warner Brothers. Miller explains in the Gaza Strip in 2008, what has motivated him to become a war photographer and to take photographs in disaster areas.

In March 2010, Miller conducted a photography workshop in Haiti during a humanitarian crisis. There was controversy over the event on forums such as Lightstalkers.org. http://zoriah.com/workshops
