= 2nd Battalion, 3rd Marines =

Infantry battalion in the US Marine Corps

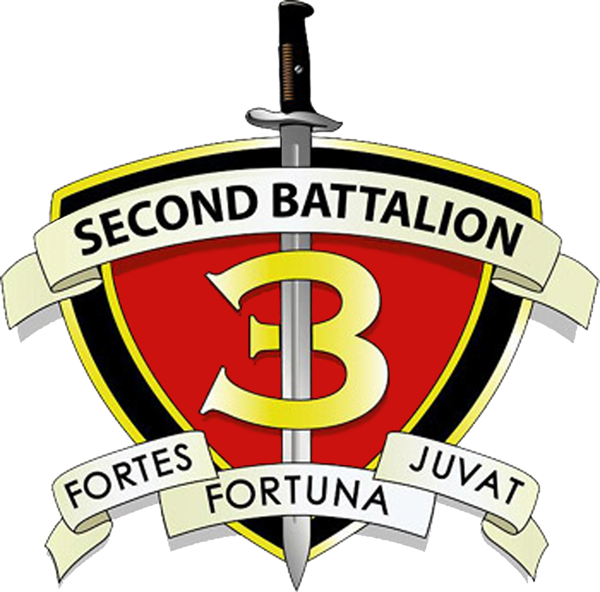
- 2nd Battalion, 3rd Marines insignia
- Active: May 1, 1942 – December 31, 1945; July 20, 1951 – January 21, 2022
- Country: United States
- Branch: United States Marine Corps
- Type: Light infantry
- Role: Locate, close with and destroy the enemy with fire and maneuver
- Part of: 3rd Marine Regiment; 3rd Marine Division
- Nickname: "Island Warriors"
- Motto: "Fortuna Fortes Juvat (Fortune Favors the Brave)"
- Engagements: World War II: Battle of Bougainville; Battle of Guam; Vietnam War; Operation Desert Storm; War on terror: Operation Enduring Freedom; Operation Iraqi Freedom; War in Afghanistan (2001–2021); Operation Red Wings

Commanders
- Notable commanders: Hector de Zayas

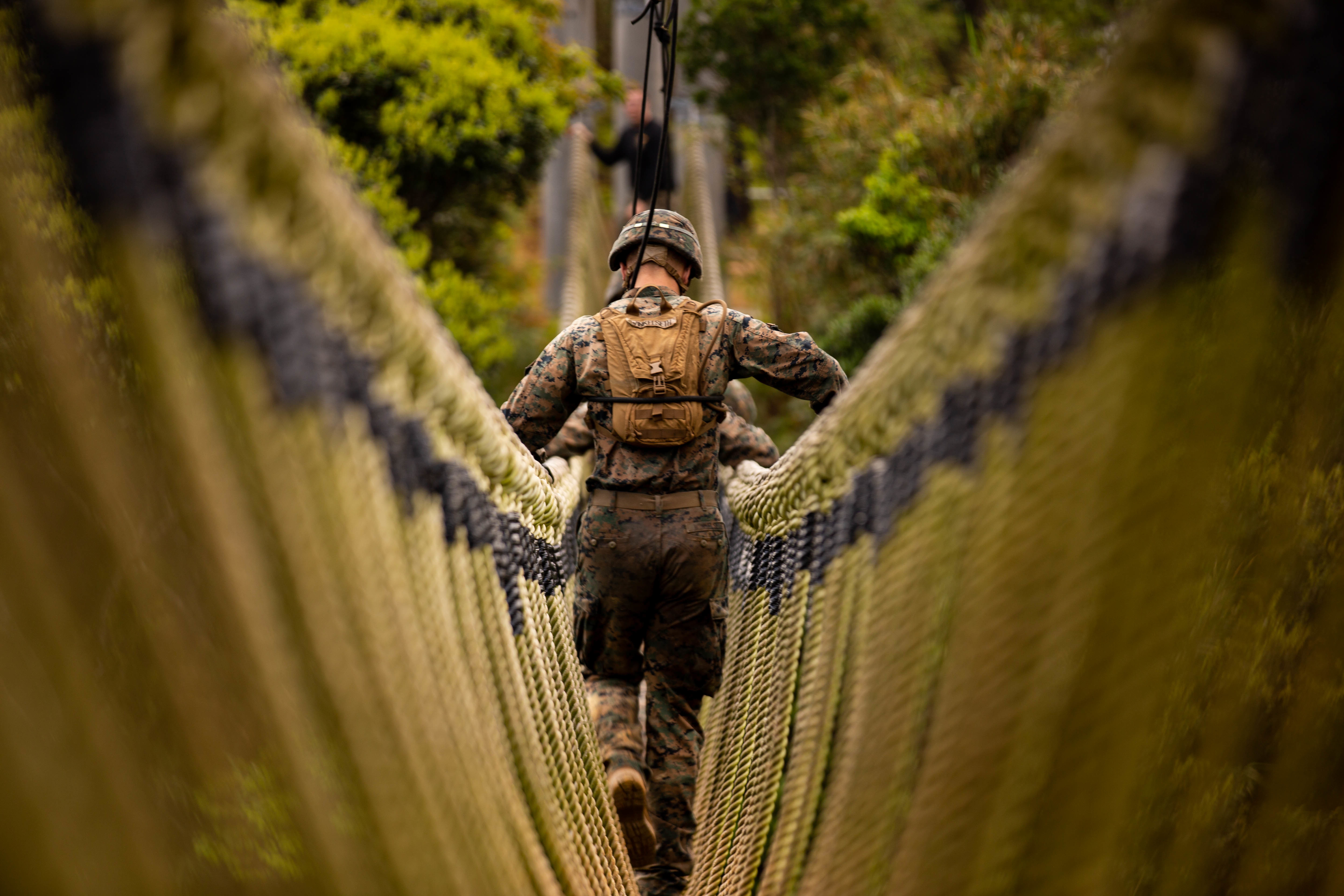
U.S. Marines with 2nd Battalion, 3rd Marine Regiment, cross a rope bridge during the endurance course at the Jungle Warfare Training Center on Okinawa, Japan, March 20, 2020. JWTC prepares Marines for a jungle warfare environment by teaching survival skills, simulating jungle combat scenarios and requiring Marines to implement small unit tactics. (U.S. Marine Corps photo by Lance Cpl. Jackson Dukes)

2nd Battalion, 3rd Marines (2/3) was an infantry battalion in the United States Marine Corps based out of Marine Corps Base Hawaii consisting of approximately 1,000 Marines and sailors. The battalion fell under the command of the 3rd Marine Regiment and the 3rd Marine Division. The battalion was deactivated in January 2022 as part of the Marine Corps' ongoing Force Design efforts.

== Subordinate units ==
- Headquarters and Services Company (HSC)
- Echo Company (E Company)
- Fox Company (F Company)
- Golf Company (G Company)
- Hotel Company (H Company)
- The Weapons Company (WPNS Company)

== History ==
=== World War II (1942–1945) ===
The 3rd Training Battalion, Division Special Troops, 1st Marine Division was activated on May 1, 1942, at New River, North Carolina. On June 17 of that same year, they redesignated the "2d Training Battalion, 3rd Marines" and in September were deployed to Tutuila, American Samoa and reassigned to the 2d Marine Brigade. They remained there until they moved to Auckland, New Zealand in May 1943. In June of that year, they were reassigned to the 3d Marine Division and were again moved to Guadalcanal in July.

2/3 participated in the following World War II campaigns:

- Battle of Bougainville
- Battle of Guam
- Battle of Iwo Jima

Finally, the unit was again relocated in December 1945 to Camp Pendleton, California and by the end of the month (December 31) they were deactivated.

On November 1, 1943, the 3rd Marine Division assaulted Bougainville. Landing at Blue Beach 2, 2/3 was the first to reach the island and faced little resistance from the defending Japanese. On November 20, 2/3 led in breaking an enemy roadblock on the Numa-Numa Trail, discovering a 400-foot ridge. A platoon led by First Lieutenant Steve J. Cibik moved ahead of the battalion, holding the ridge against several counterattacks for the next four days. 2/3 was crossing the Piva River on November 21 when the Marines were pinned down by heavy fire from a Japanese bunker complex. 2/3 then encountered an enemy battalion supporting the bunker system, and was able to withdraw with minimal casualties. On November 24, 2/3 moved forward 250 yards under heavy fire, taking heavy casualties while crossing a meandering stream eight times. The battle of Piva Forks concluded the next day. On December 25, the 3rd Marines left Bougainville and returned to Guadalcanal. On July 21, 1944, 2/3 went ashore at Red Beach One near Adelup Point during the battle of Guam. 2/3 Marines went up over the ridge overlooking the beach between Chonito Cliff and Bundschu Ridge, but fierce enemy resistance kept his entire regiment pinned down. Company E was able to take the high ground by the end of the day, but only after the Japanese had withdrawn. 2/3 spent the entire next day continuously engaging the enemy. On July 25, 2/3 punched through enemy cave defenses on the drive toward Fonte Ridge. That night and into the next morning, his battalion helped to repulse multiple Japanese banzai attacks. Both sides took heavy casualties. By dawn, 2/3 Battalion Commander Lieutenant Colonel Hector de Zayas learned of the potential of a second enemy attack and moved to the front lines to reposition his men. While he was in this exposed forward position, de Zayas was shot and killed by a Japanese sniper. The executive officer of 2/3, Major William A. Culpepper, assumed command for the remainder of the battle.

=== 1951–1960 ===
During this nearly decade-long period, the unit was reactivated and went through various reassignments and non-combat deployments:

- Reactivated on 20 July 1951 at Camp Pendleton, California, and assigned to 3d Marine Brigade, Fleet Marine Force.
- Reassigned during January 1952 to 3d Marine Division
- Deployed during July–August 1953 to Camp Fuji-McNair, Japan
- Redeployed during March 1957 to Camp Sukiran, Okinawa
- Redeployed during March 1958 to Camp Sukiran, Okinawa
- Relocated during November 1959 to Camp Pendleton, California and reassigned to 1st Marine Division, Fleet Marine Force

=== Vietnam War (1961–1969) ===
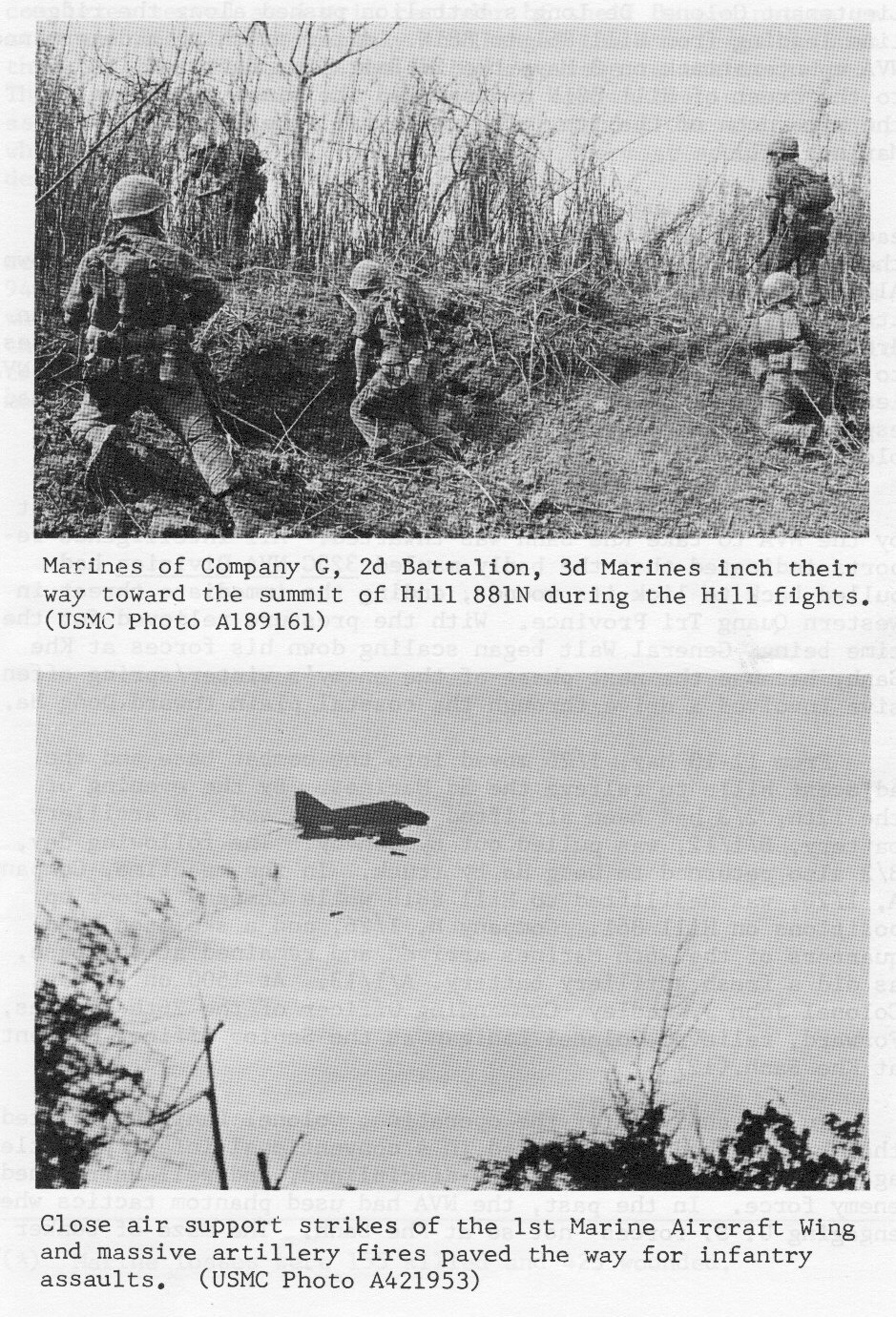
Marines from 2/3 in Vietnam during the Battle of Khe Sanh

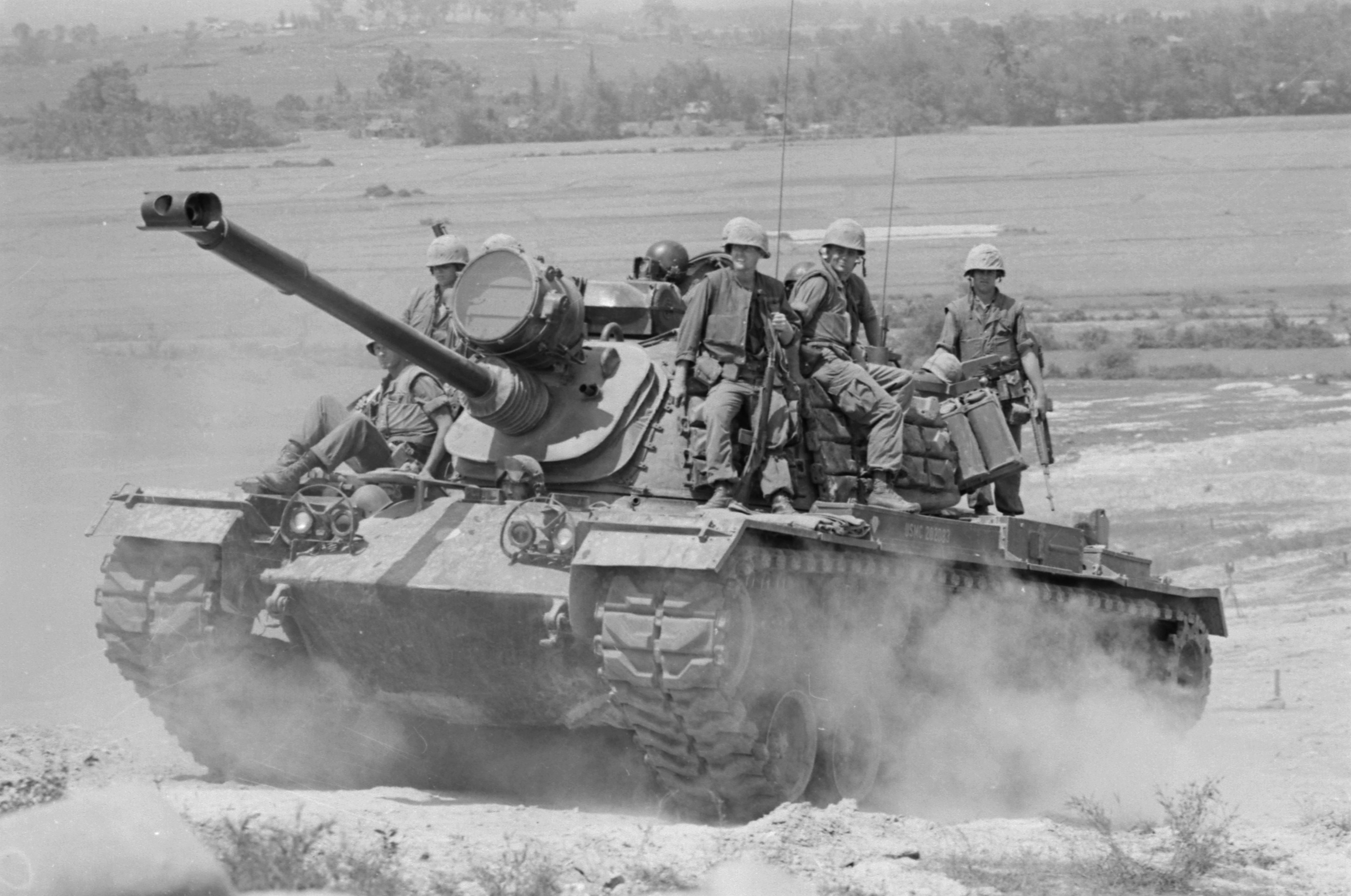
2/3 Marines on the back of an M48 tank in Vietnam in 1966

In January 1961 2/3 was redeployed to Camp Schwab, Okinawa, and reassigned to 3d Marine Division, Fleet Marine Force. From there the unit deployed at various times between 1961 and 1967 as the Battalion Landing Team of the Seventh Fleet. In April 1965 2/3 deployed to Da Nang in the Republic of Vietnam. They fought in Vietnam from April 1965 until October 1969, operating from:

- DaNang
- Camp Carroll
- Quảng Trị
- Cam Lộ
- Dong Ha Combat Base
- Khe Sanh

During the night of 12 August 1965, the battalion made a night helicopter assault into the Elephant Valley south of Da Nang, shortly after Marine ground troops arrived in the country. In April 1967, 2/3 was flown to Khe Sanh and walked north up into the DMZ and participated in one of the bloodiest fights, later to be known as The Hill Fights. In October 1969, the battalion left South Vietnam and relocated to Marine Corps Base Camp Pendleton and was reassigned to 5th Marine Amphibious Brigade, Fleet Marine Force.

=== 1970s–1980s ===
For this period 2/3 saw more reassignments, redesignations and relocations.

- Reassigned during April 1971 to 1st Marine Division, Fleet Marine Force
- Relocated during May – June 1971 to Kaneohe Bay, Hawaii and reassigned to 1st Marine Brigade, Fleet Marine Force. ? Why are the four deployments that 2/3 made in 1977/78, 1979, 1980, and 1981 added to this information?
- 1st Marine Brigade redesignated 30 August 1985 as 1st Marine Amphibious Brigade
- 1st Marine Amphibious Brigade redesignated 5 February 1988 as 1st Marine Expeditionary Brigade

=== Gulf War and the 1990s ===
In January 1991, under the command of Lt. Col. Robert B. Blose, 2d Battalion, 3rd Marines deployed to Saudi Arabia and participated in Operation Desert Shield, Operation Desert Storm and the Liberation of Kuwait. The battalion, which was on deployment to Okinawa, Japan, was deployed to Southwest Asia from January to April 1991, when 2/3 returned to Kaneohe Bay. The unit deployed back to Okinawa in August 1991 on Unit Deployment Program to January 1992. The unit was later reassigned to the 3rd Marine Division in October 1994.

=== Operation Enduring Freedom and Operation Iraqi Freedom ===
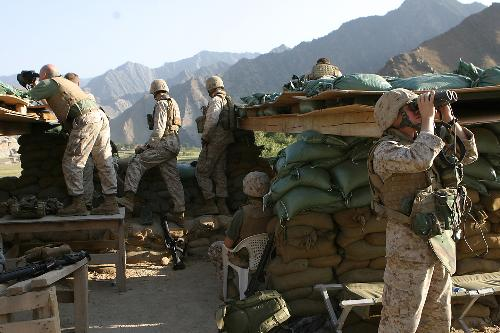
2/3 Marines in Afghanistan in late 2005

The battalion deployed in support of Operation Enduring Freedom in the Kunar and Laghman provinces in northeastern Afghanistan in 2005–2006. During this deployment, the battalion planned and participated in Operation Red Wings and planned and carried out Operation Whalers. While Red Wings garnered a large amount of press due to the loss of 19 special operations personnel, Whalers, which was successful in defeating the target cell that inflicted the losses of Red Wings, was little reported at the time. 2/3 lost four members of the battalion during this deployment. 2/3 deployed in support of Operation Iraqi Freedom in the Haditha "triad" region of Al Anbar Province in western Iraq in 2006–2007. 2/3 faced some of the worst fightings in the entire war. They were one of the last Marine units to face combat in Al Anbar. 2/3 suffered 23 KIAs from September 2006 to April 2007 and were given the nickname "The Angels of Anbar." In February 2008, the battalion again deployed to Iraq, operating in the vicinity of Fallujah. On June 26, 2008, the commanding officer of 2/3, LtCol Max Galeai and two other Marines (Captain Philip J. Dykeman and Cpl. Marcus W. Preudhomme) from the battalion were killed when a suicide bomber dressed as an Iraqi policeman detonated explosives concealed in his pants at a meeting of tribal sheiks in the town of Karmah. The battalion returned from this deployment in late August/early September 2008. 2/3 Deployed to Afghanistan in 2009 (14 KIA) as part of the 2nd Marine Expeditionary Brigade. They were part of the 17,000 troop increase announced by President Obama in mid-February.

2/3 returned to Marine Corps Base Hawaii in late 2009, and redeployed to Afghanistan in November 2010 to Helmand province to the Nawa-I-Barakzayi District. During this deployment, due to increased security in Nawa, Fox Company was attached to 3rd Battalion 9th Marines in Marjah.

2/3 returned from Afghanistan in June 2011. In April 2012 Fox Company was the first US military unit to begin regular training rotations through northern Australia. It is expected that eventually 2500 US Marines will be posted near Darwin, Northern Territory with the 5th Battalion, Royal Australian Regiment, as part of increased security ties between the two nations (See Australia–United States relations).

=== Deactivation ===
In 2022, the Marine Corps announced 2/3 will be deactivated. 2/3 was officially decommissioned on January 21, 2022, at a ceremony at MCB Hawaii.

== Awards ==
=== 2/3 Medal of Honor recipients ===
During World War II, PFC Leonard F. Mason, serving with the 2/3, despite being mortally wounded, single-handedly destroyed an enemy machine gun position during the Battle of Guam. Mason was posthumously awarded the Medal of Honor.

During the Vietnam War, PFC Bruce W. Carter threw himself on a grenade to save the lives of fellow Marines. He was posthumously awarded the Medal of Honor.

During the Vietnam War, Staff Sergeant Peter S. Connor was awarded the MOH (posthumously) for actions on 25 February 1966.

During the Vietnam War, Private First Class James Anderson, Jr. was awarded the MOH (posthumously) for actions on 28 February 1967.

=== Unit awards ===
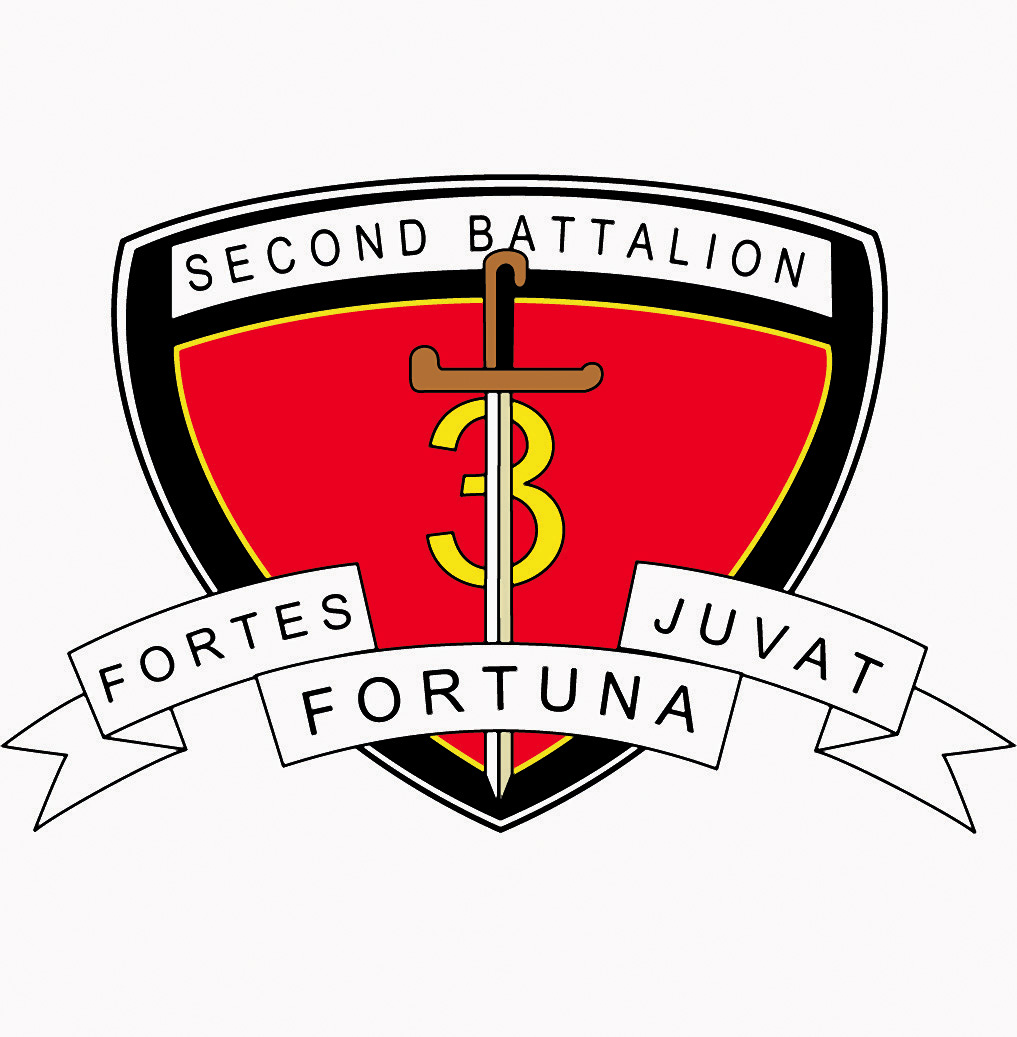
Older variation of the 2–3 insignia

- Presidential Unit Citation with 4 bronze stars
  - Guam – 1944
  - Vietnam – 1965 – 1967, 1967, 1968
  - Afghanistan – 05/2009 to 10/2009 RCT 3 (MARADMIN 615/12)
- Navy Unit Commendation w/ 1 silver star and 2 bronze stars
  - Bougainville – 1943
  - Vietnam – 1968
  - Desert Storm – 1990–1991
  - Iraq – 2006
  - Iraq – 2007 II MEF FWD (MARADMIN 055/12)
  - Iraq – 2008 I MEF FWD (MARADMIN 056/12)
  - Afghanistan – 2010–2011 I MEF FWD (MARADMIN 492/12)
- Meritorious Unit Commendation w/ 3 bronze stars
  - Vietnam – 1968
  - Afghanistan – 2005
  - III MEF- 2008–2010 (MARADMIN 617/11)
- Asiatic-Pacific Campaign Streamer w/ 4 bronze stars
- World War II Victory Streamer
- National Defense Service Streamer w/ 3 bronze stars
- Korean Service Streamer
- Vietnam Service Streamer w/ 2 silver stars
- Southwest Asia Service Streamer w/ 2 bronze stars
- Vietnam Cross of Gallantry w/ palm streamer
- Afghanistan Campaign Streamer w/ 3 bronze star
- Iraq Campaign Streamer w/ 2 bronze stars
- Global War on Terrorism Service Streamer
- Global War on Terrorism Expeditionary Streamer
- Nato ISAF Streamer

== Notable Marines ==
- Paul Schaus, wounded Afghanistan veteran and Paralympic hockey player
- James L. Jones Jr., platoon commander in Golf Company in 1967 and company commander of Golf Company in 1968; went on to become the 32nd Commandant of the Marine Corps in July 1999
- Eric Smith_(general), platoon commander and Company Executive officer

== See also ==
- List of United States Marine Corps battalions
- Organization of the United States Marine Corps

== Bibliography ==
- Darack, Ed (2009). Victory Point: Operations Red Wings and Whalers – The Marine Corps' Battle for Freedom in Afghanistan. Penguin Group. ISBN 0-425-22619-0.
