= Platoon guide =

Position in the US Army and Marine Corps

A platoon guide is a position, but not a rank, in the United States Army and Marine Corps. The guide sets the direction and cadence of the march.

In an infantry platoon the platoon guide is a noncommissioned officer (by Table of Organization [TO] a sergeant in the US Marine Corps) who acts as an assistant platoon sergeant. The platoon guide is responsible for ensuring the platoon is supplied with ammunition and rations and, in combat operations, may be tasked by the platoon commander to take temporary charge of casualties or enemy prisoners of war/detainees until they are evacuated to the rear. The army changed the platoon guide title to assistant platoon sergeant after World War II and eliminated the position after the Korean War.

In a basic training unit, the platoon guide is the senior recruit in the platoon chosen by his or her drill instructor as a liaison between the drill instructor and the platoon and the recruit leadership of the platoon.

In Marine Corps training units the platoon guide also carries the platoon guidon. This is derived from 19th-century guide sergeants, who carried marker flags to denote the flanks of an infantry regiment, and was applied to smaller units as tactics changed.
