= Human rights abuses during the Battle of Mosul (2016–2017) =

Aspect of the 2013–2017 conflict in Iraq

Coordinates: 35.8003°N 43.2897°E

During the Battle of Mosul (2016–2017), numerous reports of human rights abuses surfaced against the various parties involved in the conflict. Up to 1.5 million civilians lived in the city, sparking concerns among various organizations of a large humanitarian crisis. Lise Grande, the United Nations' humanitarian coordinator in Iraq, stated, "In a worst-case scenario, we're literally looking at the single largest humanitarian operation in the world in 2016." Save the Children warned that massive civilian bloodshed was likely, unless safe routes were authorized to let civilians flee. The U.S. government has accused ISIL of using civilians as human shields.

== Human rights abuses ==
=== ISIL abuses, abductions and atrocities ===
Fears that civilians could be used as human shields by ISIL were realized as it was confirmed the group had been abducting civilians from villages for this purpose, which received widespread condemnation from human rights groups and the United Nations Security Council.

ISIL has reportedly threatened to execute civilians trying to flee. Snipers, landmines, toxic weapons and trenches were preventing people from attempting to escape. Iraqi officials, via radio broadcasts and leaflets dropped over the city, warned civilians to stay in their homes. Leaflets advised residents of various precautions to take including instructions to tape over their windows to protect from flying glass and to disconnect gas pipes.

Shortly after the battle began, news surfaced of ISIL kidnapping and executing civilians in Mosul. Pentagon spokesman Capt. Jeff Davis stated that ISIL was using civilians as human shields and holding people against their will in the city.

The International Business Times reported that ISIL has forced boys from Mosul as young as 12 to fight for them, and that ISIL had trained the children to "behead prisoners and make suicide bombs".

An Iraqi intelligence source stated on 21 October that ISIL executed 284 men and boys abducted from Mosul for the purpose of using them as human shields. The civilians were shot and put in a mass grave. A United Nations official said the UN is "gravely worried" about the fate of 200 families from Somalia and 350 families from Najafia who were abducted Monday by ISIL, who could be used as human shields.

UN sources stated that four people died from inhaling toxic fumes after ISIL set fire to the Al-Mishraq Chemical Factory on 23 October.

On 26 October, CNN reported that ISIL has been carrying out "retribution killings" of civilians as revenge for others welcoming Iraqi and Peshmerga troops in villages restored under government control.

According to Ravina Shamdasani, of the Office of the UN High Commissioner for Human Rights, ISIL executed 232 people near Mosul in late October for defying its orders and had taken tens of thousands of people to use as human shields against advancing Iraqi forces. She claimed that ISIL "executed 42 civilians in Hamam al-Alil, south of Mosul. Also on Wednesday, ISIL executed 190 former Iraqi Security Forces for refusing to join them, in the Al Ghazlani base near Mosul."

Iraqi forces evacuated more than 1,000 civilians from the front lines surrounding Mosul on 26 October, moving them to the Khazir region. Civilians on the southern front had reported that their relatives had been taken by retreating ISIL fighters to be used as human shields.

In October 2016, Iraqi government launched a military operation in Mosul to recapture the city from ISIL. Based on reports provided by the Euro-Mediterranean Human Rights Monitor, more than a million residents in Mosul are at risk and many of them were killed or used as human shields against the advance of Iraqi army. Euro-Mediterranean Human Rights Monitor warns that Iraqi government and international forces have to put an end to the humanitarian crisis in Mosul and provide its residents with their basic needs. ISIL has driven some of Mosul's residents out of their neighborhoods while others were prevented from fleeing to the regions controlled by Iraqi army. Human rights are violated by both ISIL, which drove about 550 families from the villages of As-Semalyya and An-Nejafyya, and Iraqi troops which captured 1,500 civilians from mosques and schools in the Dybka refugee camp. On 21 October 2016, another human rights violation committed by Iraqi army and police as they arrested almost hundreds of civilians and executing some villagers in the south of Mosul claiming that they are hosting ISIL militias. On the same day, Iraqi airstrikes targeted a funeral in Kirkuk province causing death of 20 people and injuring dozens others. Mosul's population reached to 1.5 million people, including 600,000 children who are besieged by ISIL militias and suffering from the shortage of food, water, electricity and medical care. ISIL militias monopolize the local hospitals in Mosul and Al-Hemdanyya District to treat only its supporters and members. About 690 families have been evacuated from the Makhmoor District east of Mosul and Al-Hemdanyya District to the Al- Hood camp.

On 31 October, a member of the Nineveh Provincial Council stated that ISIL executed 300 civilians and former security members in the village of Moshairefa, north of Mosul. They had been imprisoned and accused of collaborating with the government.

Mosul Eye reported on 3 November that mortar strikes killed five civilians in Mosul.

Two roadside bombs struck a convoy of civilians fleeing Hawija on 4 November as the families were being taken to the town of Al-Alam. At least 18 people were killed, a police officer said.

On 7 November, the Iraqi War Media Office announced that the bodies of estimated 300 people were found in a mass grave at the agriculture college in Hamam al-Alil, south of Mosul. Many had been decapitated. Iraqi forces made the discovery after noticing the smell. Abdul Rahman al-Waggaa, a member of the Nineveh provincial council, said ISIL had used the college as "a killing field." The Iraqi War Media Office said there would be an investigation into the murders: "Inside the building of the Faculty of Agriculture there is a new crime: the presence of 100 beheaded bodies of citizens killed by terrorists, and a special team will be sent to inspect this heinous crime," the office said in a statement.

The United Nations reported on 8 November that ISIL had abducted 295 former Iraqi Security Forces members and 1,500 families from Hamam al-Alil, forcing them to retreat with the militants into Mosul.

On 9 November, it was reported that ISIL killed at least 20 civilians after accusing them of being spies. Five crucified bodies were displayed at a traffic intersection, while others were left hanging from traffic signals and electricity poles. Civilians who had fled the city in the previous few days reported that ISIL was using suicide bombs to attack residents in addition to Iraqi forces.

BBC News reported on 11 November that ISIL executed 40 civilians in Mosul after accusing them of being spies. One man was killed for defying the ban on mobile phone use. They were shot and their bodies displayed around the city.

The U.N. Office of Human Rights provided new details that ISIL is using chemical weapons and has stockpiled "large quantities" of ammonia and sulfur. "We can only speculate how they intend to use this," U.N. spokeswoman Ravina Shamdasani said. "We are simply raising the alarm that this is happening, that this is being stockpiled."

On 17 November, Iraqi forces found two more mass graves near Hamam Alil, containing at least 250 bodies. One of the graves was inside a well. "We believe the well contains more than 200 bodies. ISIS used this mass grave to kill and dump people over the past two years," Iraqi Federal Police Commander Brig. Gen. Faris Radhi Abbas told CNN.

In late February 2017, Iraqi forces uncovered the largest known mass grave dug by ISIL at the "Khafsa Sinkhole" near Mosul, containing the bodies of 4,000 Iraqi government personnel. They had been killed by ISIL shortly after the Fall of Mosul in June 2014.

According to the United Nations, ISIL killed at least 163 civilians on 1 June 2017 in the al-Shira neighbourhood to prevent them from fleeing western Mosul.

On 3 July 2017, forensic medicine doctors recovered 74 dead bodies that were likely to be killed by ISIL for trying to flee on the streets in al-Zanjili district, northwest of the city.

On 24 July 2017, a mass grave containing sixty bodies, was discovered in western Mosul, with 44 of them belongs to security agents of the Nineveh police. Iraqi Cap. Ahmed al-Obaidi said the body showed signs of torture, and some which seemed to have been shot in the heads. On 2 November 2017, UN assistance Mission for Iraq (UNAMI) published a report on liberation of Mosul and concluded that ISIL members should face "international crimes" charges.

=== Allegations against anti-ISIL forces ===
The presence with Iraqi forces of several militias with histories of human rights abuses was criticized; Human Rights Watch called for Shia militias from the Popular Mobilization Forces (PMF) not to enter Mosul, following allegations of abuse of Sunni Muslims in anti-ISIL operations in Fallujah, Tikrit and Amirli. Iraqi Prime Minister Haider al-Abadi later stated that only the Iraqi army and the Iraqi national police would enter the city itself.

On 21 October, International Business Times reported that "disturbing and graphic footage posted to social media allegedly shows Iraqi security forces torturing and interrogating young children for information about ISIL as they attempt to retake Mosul from the Islamic State terror group."

On 11 November, the multiple news outlets including Al Arabiya, Daily Mirror and Middle East Monitor reported about a leaked video of the Iraqi Special Forces allegedly murdering an Iraqi Sunni child by running him over with an M1 Abrams tank. The boy, identified as Muhammad Ali Al-Hadidi, was dragged through the desert and shot before the tank was run over him. The men in the video were identified as Shia militiamen and yelled sectarian slurs at the child as well asking the cameraman to film them doing it. The video caused outrage on social media, with Arab users of social media using the hashtag #CrushedByATank (Arabic: #السحق_بالدبابة). The soldiers were wearing the insignia of the Iraqi Special Forces.

On 19 January, Iraqi forces summarily executed three civilians who they later claimed were IS suspects.

The Middle East Monitor claimed Iraqi Shia Groups of targeting Sunni Arabs "in a possible genocide", and claimed that "Sunni Arabs are being targeted for ethnic cleansing by Iraqi Christians". However, Middle East Monitor was the sole origin of the report.

On 17 March, a U.S.-led coalition airstrike in Mosul killed more than 200 civilians. Amnesty International's senior investigator on crisis response said: "The high civilian toll suggests that coalition forces leading the offensive in Mosul have failed to take adequate precautions to prevent civilian deaths, in flagrant violation of international humanitarian law."

On 12 July, after the Iraqi Government's declaration of victory, a video posted online by the Mosul Eye blog showing a man suspected to be an ISIL fighter was being held in a building and then dragged by soldiers across an open area to a ledge above a drop of at least 30 feet, where another body lied motionless. A second video also showed a man in Iraqi Army fatigues gunning down an unarmed man kneeling in front of a car. The Iraqi government later said they were investigating the footage.

An estimate in mid-July 2017 by Kurdish intelligence put the total number of civilian casualties at 40,000. The largest portion of this loss of life is attributable to the unyielding artillery bombardment by Iraqi government forces – in particular, units of the Iraqi federal police – of west Mosul. Killings by ISIL and air strikes were two other significant sources of civilian deaths.

On 19 July, Human Rights Watch published a report stating that Iraqi forces extrajudicial killings, torture and unlawful detention in the final phase of the battle and details the discovery of the corpses of 17 men, executed in an empty building in west Mosul, on 17 July.

On 27 July, Human Rights Watch urged the US government to suspend all support for the Iraqi Army's 16th Division after members of the 16th Division lead four naked men, suspected to be ISIL fighters, down an alleyway, after which they heard multiple gunshots. One of the observers saw the bodies of a number of naked men lying in a doorway, one of whom appeared to have been handcuffed and had a rope tied around his legs. The UN report on 2 November 2017, also urged Iraqi authorities to "investigate alleged violations and human rights abuses" by Iraqi Security Forces (ISF) and associated forces during the military operation.

=== Use of chemical weapons ===
The World Health Organization stated on 4 March 2017 that twelve people were being treated in Erbil for possible exposure to chemical weapons in Mosul. The WHO said that they had enabled "an emergency response plan to safely treat men, women and children who may be exposed to the highly toxic chemical[s]" and were preparing for more patients with exposure to these agents. According to the UN, four patients show "severe signs associated with exposure to a blister agent", which they were exposed to on the eastern side of the city.

In April 2017, American and Australian advisory forces embedded with Iraqi units were attacked with low-grade, "rudimentary" chemical weapons during an offensive.

== See also ==
- Human rights in post-invasion Iraq
- Human rights violations during the Syrian Civil War
- Human rights in ISIL-controlled territory
