= Imam Gharbi =

Coordinates: 35.6949°N 43.2876°E

- Coordinates

Imam Gharbi is a village located in the Qayyarah district of Nineveh Governorate in Iraq. It is one of the largest villages in Qayyara.

== Population ==
All the inhabitants of the village of Imam Gharbi are from the Jubur tribe and the Bongad (Imam). The village is located on the right bank of the Tigris River, and opposite it is the village of Shariat al-Imam, which is inhabited by families from the same tribe.

The village has a health center, elementary, secondary, intermediate schools, and more than a kashi lab and stairs. There are many mosques in the village. The village is located on the road between Qayyara and Al-Shirqat. Near the village there is a train station for transporting goods and passengers. There is also a paved street reaching the base of Qayyara air. The village is called by other names such as the village of martyr "Hassan Sheikh".

The village was attacked by the Islamic state forces more than once; in November 2016, it announced its fall in the hands of the organization.
