= Al-Mishraq =

Mishraq Sulphur Plant
- Official name: مصنع الكبريت المشراق (Arabic)
- Country: Iraq
- Location: Qayyarah subdistrict, Nineveh Governorate
- Coordinates: 35°58′54″N 43°18′43″E
- Status: Operational
- Owner: Ministry of Industry and Minerals
- Operator: Mishraq Sulphur State Company

External links
- Website: www.mishraq.industry.gov.iq

Al-Mishraq, or Mishraq Sulphur State Company, is a state run sulfur plant near Mosul, Iraq.

It has twice been set alight and burned for prolonged periods. In 2003, what is thought to have been a deliberately started fire, burned for about three weeks, resulting in the largest human-made release of sulfur dioxide ever recorded. In 2016 it was set alight by ISIL and burned for seven days.

== Fires ==
In June 2003, it was the site of the largest human-made release of sulfur dioxide ever recorded when a fire (thought to have been deliberately started) gained control and burned for about three weeks. At its height, the fire was putting 21,000 tons of sulfur dioxide a day into the atmosphere. The pollution in Mosul, which is about 45 kilometres from Mishraq, reached a catastrophic level. For over 48 hours the white smoke from sulfur dioxide could be seen in the air. Many people were taken into hospitals and most vegetation was killed.

On 22 October 2016 the plant was set alight by ISIL militants as part of the Battle of Mosul. Two civilians died and nearly 1,000 people were treated for toxic gas inhalation. Shifting winds sent the gas to Qayyarah Airfield West, where U.S. and coalition forces were forced to use gas masks. The total mass of the released sulfur dioxide was estimated to approximately 161,000 tons distributed over seven days, equivalent to a small volcanic eruption.

== See also ==
- Environmental issues in Iraq
