= Qayyarah subdistrict =

Qayyara القيارة
- Location within Iraq
- Coordinates: 35°48′00″N 43°17′00″E
- Country: Iraq
- Governorate: Nineveh Governorate

The Qayyarah or Qayara (Arabic: القيارة) subdistrict is part of Mosul District in southern Nineveh Governorate on the west bank of Tigris river in Iraq. Its seat is the town of Qayyarah. The population in Qayyara subdistrict is primarily Sunni Muslim Arabs, belonging to various tribes, but primarily the Jubur or Jabur. Agriculture is the main source of income for its inhabitants, and farmers grow various crops including wheat and watermelons. Qayyarah is rich with natural resources, including oil and sulfur.

The name of the subdistrict derives from the Arabic word for tar.

In June 2014, the subdistrict of Qayyara fell to the Islamic State of Iraq and the Levant.

== Qayyarah oil field ==
Qayyara Oil field in Qayyara subdistrict holds 800 million barrels of estimated reserves. The field was explored by British Oil Development Co. Ltd. in 1927, and production commenced during the 1930s. The extracted oil is very heavy sour crude (API gravity 15°) therefore the production was in small quantities.

In 2010, the Angolan firm Sonangol agreed with the Iraqi government to develop Qayyara oil field as a joint venture with state-owned North Oil Company. Shares of the consortium divided between 75% shares for Sonangol, and the remaining 25% for Iraq. According to the deal, Sonangol would invest $2 billion in return of $5 per barrel. Also, under the terms of the contract, Sonangol will raise the production to 120,000 barrels per day.

== Najma oil field ==
Najma oil field in Qayyara subdistrict is in the same geological structure as Qayyara oil field. The field is 11 kilometres (6.8 mi) long and 4.5 kilometres (2.8 mi) wide. It was discovered by the British Petroleum Development Company in 1932, but production never took place because the deposit is a kind of sour heavy oil (15 to 20°API gravity) that necessitates extra cost to lighten the crude oil.

In December 2009, the field was awarded by the Iraqi government to Angolan Sonangol in the second bidding round, when the company was the sole bidder for the contract. Sonangol holds 75% stake, while the remaining portion (25%) went to North Oil Company as a secondary partner. Sonangol committed to a production plateau of 110,000 barrels per day, in return for receiving $6 per barrel from the Iraqi government.

== Sulfur mining ==
The Mishraq sulfur mine contains the world's largest reserves (600 million tons). Mishraq Sulphur State Company was established in 1969, and sulfur production started late in 1971. The Frasch process is used to exploit sulfur from underground deposits at depths of 120 metres (390 ft)–200 metres (660 ft). This process depends upon melting underground sulfur by injecting hot water into rock sulfur containing layers using special wells. Then melted sulfur is expelled from those wells with the assistance of compressed air.

== Industry ==
Based on the natural resources available in Qayyarah, industrial facilities have been built such as the Qayyara refinery and the Qayyara gas power plant.

== Qayyarah Airfield West ==
Qayyarah Airfield West (formerly known as Saddam Air base) is located in the west of Qayyara subdistrict, 16 kilometres (9.9 mi) west of the Tigris river. It has been a major Iraqi air base and played a key role during the Iran–Iraq War. Qayyarah airfield was built in the 1970s by Yugoslav companies. Formerly it housed the newest Iraqi airplanes: MiG 25s, MiG 27s and French Mirage F1s.

After the 2003 invasion of Iraq, Qayyarra airfield was used as an American base until 2010, when it was turned over to the Iraqi Army.
