= Fifth Bridge =

Bridge in Mosul, Iraq

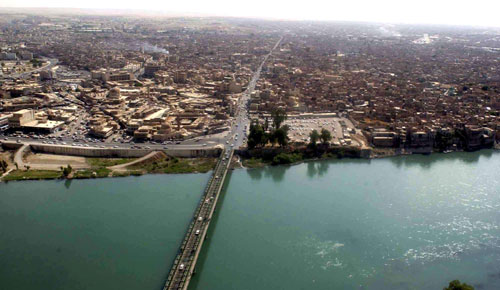
- Coordinates: 36.354205°N 43.128192°E
- Crosses: Tigris

Characteristics
- Longest span: 1,940 metres (6,365 ft)

Location
- Interactive map of Fifth Bridge

Fifth Bridge (Arabic: الجسر الخامس) is a bridge in the city of Mosul, located in the province of Nineveh Governorate in Iraq over the Tigris River. The bridge was constructed in the 1980s and links the east and west sides of the city.

During the Battle of Mosul in 2016, all bridges into the city were booby trapped with explosives by ISIL, which had occupied the city since June 2014. The bridge was destroyed by U.S. coalition airstrikes on 3 November 2016.
