= Qayyarah =

- Location within Iraq
- Coordinates: 35°47′47.0″N 43°17′36.0″E
- Country: Iraq
- Governorate: Nineveh
- Municipality: Mosul District

Government
  - Mayor: Salah Hassan Hamid

Qayyarah or Qayara (Arabic: القيارة) is an Iraqi town located in southern Nineveh Governorate on the west bank of the Tigris river, and about 60 km (35 miles) south of Mosul. It is located in the Mosul District, and it is the seat of Qayyarah subdistrict. It has a population of 15,000. Qayyarah is largely populated by Sunni Arabs.

The town is located near the Qayyarah oil field and has an oil refinery on its south-western outskirts. The Qayyarah Airfield West is 20 kilometers west of the town.

The town and subdistrict fell to the Islamic State of Iraq and the Levant in June 2014. It was reported that its recapture was of strategic importance for the offensive to retake Mosul in 2016. In August 2016, Qayyarah was fully captured by Iraqi forces, with Lieutenant General Riyadh Jalal Tawfiq stating that they controlled all parts of the city and Prime Minister Haider al-Abadi hailing the capture of the city as a "key step in the fight" against ISIL. In July 2016, the Pentagon said they were sending another 560 troops to Iraq, mainly to develop the Qayyarah airfield and use it as support for the planned attack on Mosul. Following the town's liberation, members of the Jubur tribe from Qayyarah and surrounding villages formed the Popular Mobilization Forces' 39th Regiment (nicknamed "Commandos of al-Jubur" or "Lions of the Tigris") to fight against ISIL. This unit subsequently took part in the Battle of Mosul (2016–2017).

The town's name derives from the Arabic word for tar.

Qayyarah has been known for its bitumen springs since at least the middle ages. Ibn Battuta passed through Qayyarah and described how its bitumen was exported to other towns; Shihab al-Din al-'Umari also noted that Qayyarah's bitumen springs produced a large revenue for the sultans.

== Notable people ==
- Farhan Jubouri, Iraqi intelligence officer
- Najim Abdullah al-Jubouri, Iraqi army officer
