= Battle of Mosul (2016–2017) =

Large-scale military campaign to recapture Mosul from the Islamic State

- Part of War in Iraq (2013–2017)
- Map of the advances by the Iraqi Army in Mosul city during the battle
Date	16 October 2016 – 20 July 2017^{[a]} (9 months and 5 days)
Location	Northern Iraq: Mosul; Southwest Erbil Governorate; Nineveh Governorate; 35.8003°N 43.2897°E
Result	Iraqi and allied victory
Territorial changes	The Iraqi armed forces recaptured all of eastern Mosul by 24 January 2017. The Old City and the rest of Mosul was retaken by 20 July 2017 by the Iraqi armed forces.; By 3 December 2016, the Iraqi armed forces and Peshmerga had captured a total of 5,677 km^{2} (2,192 sq mi), including 369 surrounding villages from ISIL.; Iraqi forces launch another offensive on 25 April 2017, to secure the Iraqi–Syrian border; The PMU captures 360 villages, and an area of around 14,000 km^{2} to west of Mosul, by mid-June 2017

Belligerents
Iraq: ISOF; Popular Mobilization Forces; Kata'ib al-Imam Ali; (Assyrian homeland) Nineveh Plain Protection Units; Army of the Men of the Naqshbandi Order; Kurdistan Region: (Kurdistan Region) Peshmerga; CJTF–OIR: United States; France; United Kingdom; Canada; Australia; Germany; Turkey; Netherlands; Supported by: Pakistan (intelligence sharing by ISI); Hezbollah; Iran	Islamic State

Commanders and leaders
(Iraq) Lt. Gen. Abdul Amir Yarallah (Commander of the operation) (Iraq) Lt. Gen. Talib Shaghati (Joint Military Command, ICTS) (Iraq) Lt. Gen. Abdul Ghani Asadi (Head of Counter Terrorism Command) (Iraq) Maj. Gen. Fadhil Barwari (ISOF-1 commander) (Iraq) Maj. Gen. Ma’an al-Saedi (ISOF-2 commander); Abu Mahdi al-Muhandis (Head of the PMU) (Kurdistan Region) Massoud Barzani (President of Regional Kurdish Government) (United States) Lt. Gen. Stephen J. Townsend (CJTF–OIR commander); Muhammad Kawarithmi (Hezbollah commander of Iraqi operations)	(Islamic State) Abu Bakr al-Baghdadi (Leader of ISIL) (Islamic State) Amir Mohammed Abdul Rahman al-Mawli al-Salbi (ISIL deputy, alleged involvement) (Islamic State) Ahmad Khalaf al-Jabouri (military commander for Mosul) (Islamic State) Aymam al-Mosuli † (Commander of the special security forces)

Units involved
See anti-ISIL forces order of battle	See ISIL order of battle

Strength
Total: 108,500–114,000 fighters • (Iraq) 54,000–60,000 ISF troops •14,000 paramilitary troops • (Kurdistan Region) 40,000 Peshmerga troops OP Inherent Resolve: U.S. Air Force; Royal Air Force; French Air Force; Turkish Air Force; CJTF–OIR •450 military advisors	6,000–12,000 militants (1,000+ foreigners)

Casualties and losses
(Iraq) 1,200–1,400 killed, 6,000–7,000+ wounded (Kurdistan Region) 30 killed, 70–100 wounded (United States) 2 killed, 20 wounded (Iran) 3 killed	7,757–10,859+ (per Iraqi commanders during the battle); 16,467 killed (per Iraqi diplomatic official); 25,000+ killed (per top Iraqi commander)
- 6,340 civilians killed and 17,124 injured (as of mid-March 2017, per observer Joel Wing); 8,000+ civilians killed or injured (as of 5 May 2017; per The Telegraph); 5,805 civilians killed (19 Feb.–19 June 2017, by Iraqi/Coalition strikes, per AI); 9,606–11,000 Mosul residents killed (per AP); 40,000 civilians killed (per Asayish); 2,521+ civilians killed, 1,673 wounded (per UN) (France) 2 French journalists killed 47 Iraqi journalists killed, 55 wounded (per Federation of Arab Journalists) (United Kingdom) 1 British journalist injured Displaced: 1,072,170 (per IOM); 920,000+ (per the UN and Iraq)
- ^{a} The Iraqi Government formally declared victory on 10 July 2017, but the fighting continued, with heavy airstrikes and shelling, until 20 July. The Iraqi military and CENTCOM said that these were "clearance operations."

The Battle of Mosul (Arabic: معركة الموصل, Ma'rakat al-Mawṣil) was a major battle initiated by Iraq and allied forces (Note: See Forces involved) to retake the city of Mosul from the Islamic State (IS), which had seized the city years prior in June 2014. It was the largest conventional land battle in the world since the capture of Baghdad in 2003. It was also the world's single largest military operation overall since the 2003 invasion of Iraq and was considered the toughest urban battle since World War II.

The operation, which was called Operation "We Are Coming, Nineveh" (قادمون يا نينوى; Qadimun Ya Naynawa), began on 16 October 2016, with forces besieging ISIL-controlled areas in the Nineveh Governorate surrounding Mosul, and continued with Iraqi troops and Peshmerga fighters engaging ISIL on three fronts outside Mosul, going from village to village in the surrounding area in the largest deployment of Iraqi troops since the 2003 invasion of Iraq. At dawn on 1 November 2016, the liberation of Mosul city proper began. The first ones to engage ISIL within Mosul itself were the Iraqi Special Operations Forces who initiated their attack from the east of the city. Met with fierce fighting, the government advance into the city was slowed by elaborate defenses and by the presence of civilians, but the Iraqi Prime Minister Haider al-Abadi declared "full liberation of eastern side of Mosul" on 24 January 2017. Iraqi troops began their offensive to recapture western Mosul on 19 February 2017.

On 9 July 2017, the Iraqi Prime Minister arrived in Mosul to announce the victory over ISIL, and an official declaration of victory was proclaimed on 10 July. However, heavy clashes continued in a final pocket of ISIL resistance in the Old City, for almost another two weeks. It was estimated that removing the explosives from Mosul and repairing the city over the next five years would require $50 billion (2017 USD), while Mosul's Old City alone would cost about US$1 billion to repair.

The Battle of Mosul was concurrent with the Battle of Sirte (2016) in Libya and the Raqqa campaign (2016–17) conducted by the Syrian Democratic Forces (SDF) against ISIL's capital city and stronghold in Syria.

In 2017, John Spencer listed Mosul as one of the cities destroyed by violent combat, joining battles such as Stalingrad, Huế, Grozny, Aleppo and Raqqa. It has been referred to as a "modern day Verdun". During the battle, top coalition commander, Stephen J. Townsend, stated that it was "the most significant urban combat to take place since World War II".

== Background ==
Map of the territorial control during the 2016 Mosul offensive, as of August 2016

=== General background ===
Mosul is Iraq's second most populous city. It fell to 800–1,500 ISIL militants in June 2014, because of the largely Sunni population's deep distrust of the primarily Shia Iraqi government. It was in the Great Mosque in Mosul that ISIL leader Abu Bakr al-Baghdadi declared the beginning of ISIL's self-proclaimed "caliphate" which spans Iraq and Syria. The original population of 2.5 million fell to approximately 1.5 million after two years of ISIL rule. The city was once extremely diverse, with ethnic minorities including Armenians, Yazidis, Assyrian, Turkmen and Shabak people, all of whom have suffered under the (majority Sunni Arab) Islamic State. Mosul was the last stronghold of ISIL in Iraq, and the anticipated offensive to reclaim it was promoted as the "mother of all battles."

=== Preparations for the battle ===
In the weeks leading up to the ground offensive, the U.S.-led CJTF–OIR coalition bombed ISIL targets, and the Iraqi Army made gradual advances on the city. Royal Air Force's Reaper drones, Typhoons, and Tornados targeted "rocket launchers, ammunition stockpiles, artillery pieces and mortar positions" in the 72 hours before the ground assault began. Leaflets dropped on the city by the Iraqi military advised young male residents to "rise up" against ISIL when the battle began. To prepare defenses against the assault, ISIL operatives dug four-square-metre holes around the city, which they planned to fill with burning oil to reduce visibility. They also built hundreds of elaborate tunnels in the villages surrounding Mosul, rigged with explosives and booby-traps, and laid Improvised explosive devices (IEDs) and land mines along the roads. There was considerable concern that ISIL might employ chemical weapons against soldiers and civilians.

According to Iraqi sources, the assault towards Mosul was being waged from Al-Khazer axis (east of Mosul), Mosul Dam (northern axis), Baashiqa axis (eastern axis), Al-Qayyarah axis (southern axis) and Talul el-Baj- Al-Khadr axis (southwestern axis).

=== Forces involved in the offensive ===
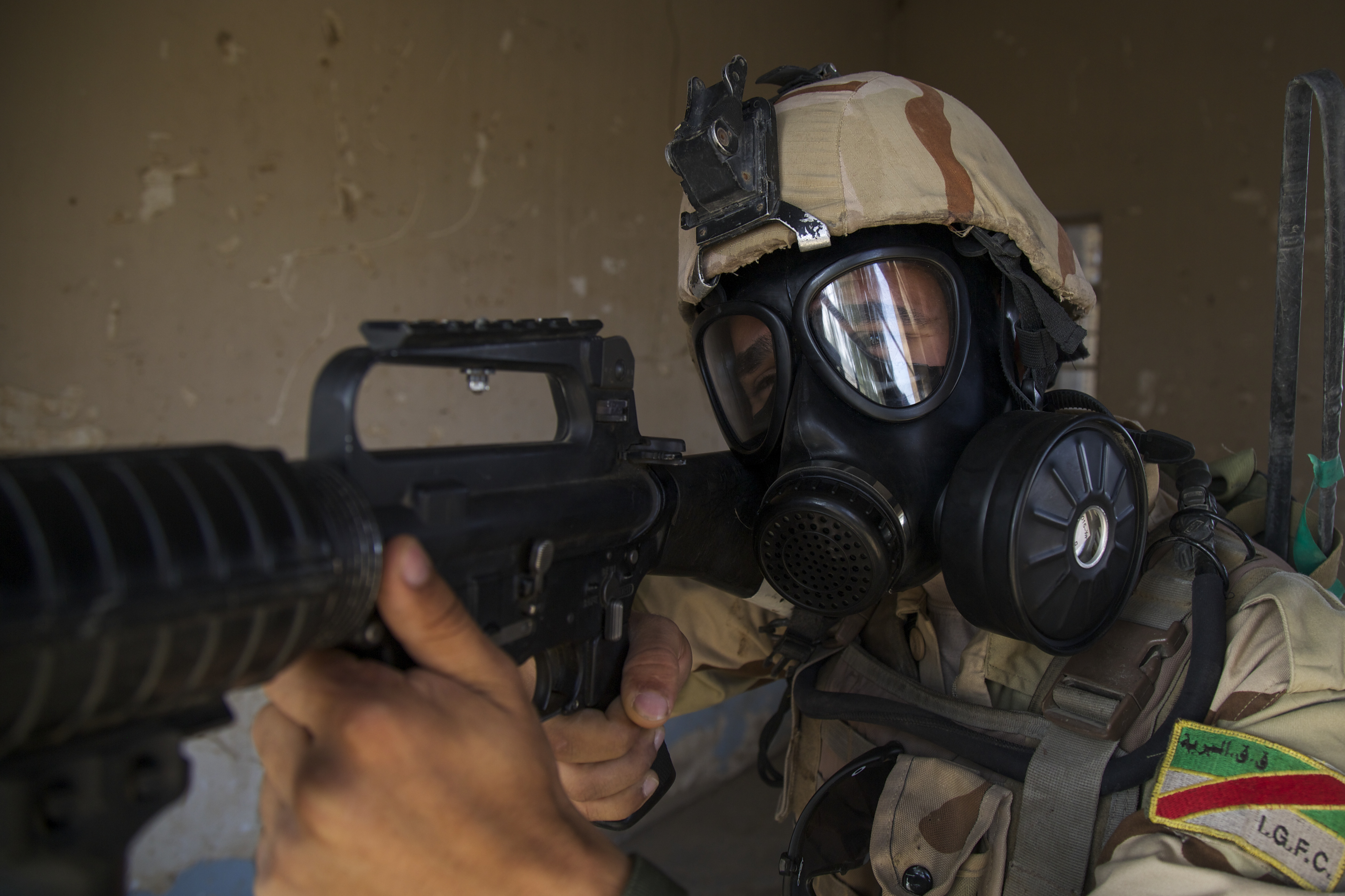
An Iraqi soldier during a course on chemical, biological, radiological and nuclear defense training at Camp Taji. Coalition forces expressed fears ISIL may use chemical weapons during the Battle of Mosul.

About 3,000–5,000 ISIL militants were estimated to be in Mosul city, according to the United States Department of Defense. Other estimates ranged as low as 2,000 and high as 12,000 ISIL fighters. Mosul Eye estimated approximately 8,000–9,000 fighters loyal to ISIL, with "half of them... highly trained, and the rest... either teenagers or not well trained. About ten percent of the fighters are foreign (Arabs and non-Arabs). The rest are Iraqis. Most are from Nineveh's townships and districts." Prior to the start of the battle, in late September 2016, it was estimated that around 20,000 ISIL fighters were living in Mosul, many of whom later fled the city to Syria and Ar-Raqqah, when Iraqi forces began to besiege Mosul. The IS garrison was led by several commanders. For much of the battle, Ahmad Khalaf al-Jabouri (an Iraqi ex-special forces officer) acted as main military commander; Iraqi security analyst Hisham al-Hashimi described al-Jabouri as an overall capable militant leader. Another local IS officer was Aymam al-Mosuli (nicknamed "ISIS Rambo"), a bodyguard of Abu Bakr al-Baghdadi and head of the special security units. According to a pro-IS source, al-Baghdadi's deputy Amir Mohammed Abdul Rahman al-Mawli al-Salbi was also involved in the battle.

The Iraqi-led coalition was initially estimated by CNN to have 94,000 members. but this number was later revised upward to 108,500; 54,000 to 60,000 Iraqi security forces (ISF) soldiers, 16,000 Popular Mobilization Forces (PMF) fighters (also referred to as PMU), and 40,000 Peshmerga (including approximately 200 Iranian Kurdish female fighters from the Kurdistan Freedom Party (PAK)) were deployed in the battle. The Iraqi and Peshmerga forces deployed for the Mosul operation were estimated to have outnumbered the ISIL militants present by 10-to-1.

Among the PMF units, the Nineveh Plain Protection Units composed of Assyrians were among the paramilitary forces in the government coalition. Shia militias, including several brigades of the paramilitary organization Hashd al-Shaabi, the Peace Companies, Kata'ib Hezbollah, the League of the Righteous, the Badr Organization, Saraya Ashura, Saraya Khorasani, Kata'ib al-Imam Ali, Harakat Hezbollah al-Nujaba and Turkmen Brigades also took part. The Ezidi community of the Sinjar region contributed the Sinjar Resistance Units (YBŞ) and Êzîdxan Women's Units (YJÊ), which operated in concert with Sunni Arab Shammar tribal militias and People's Defence Forces (HPG) of the Kurdistan Workers' Party (PKK). Other Assyrian forces involved in the planned offensive included the Nineveh Plain Forces (NPF) and Dwekh Nawsha, who are allied to the Peshmerga.

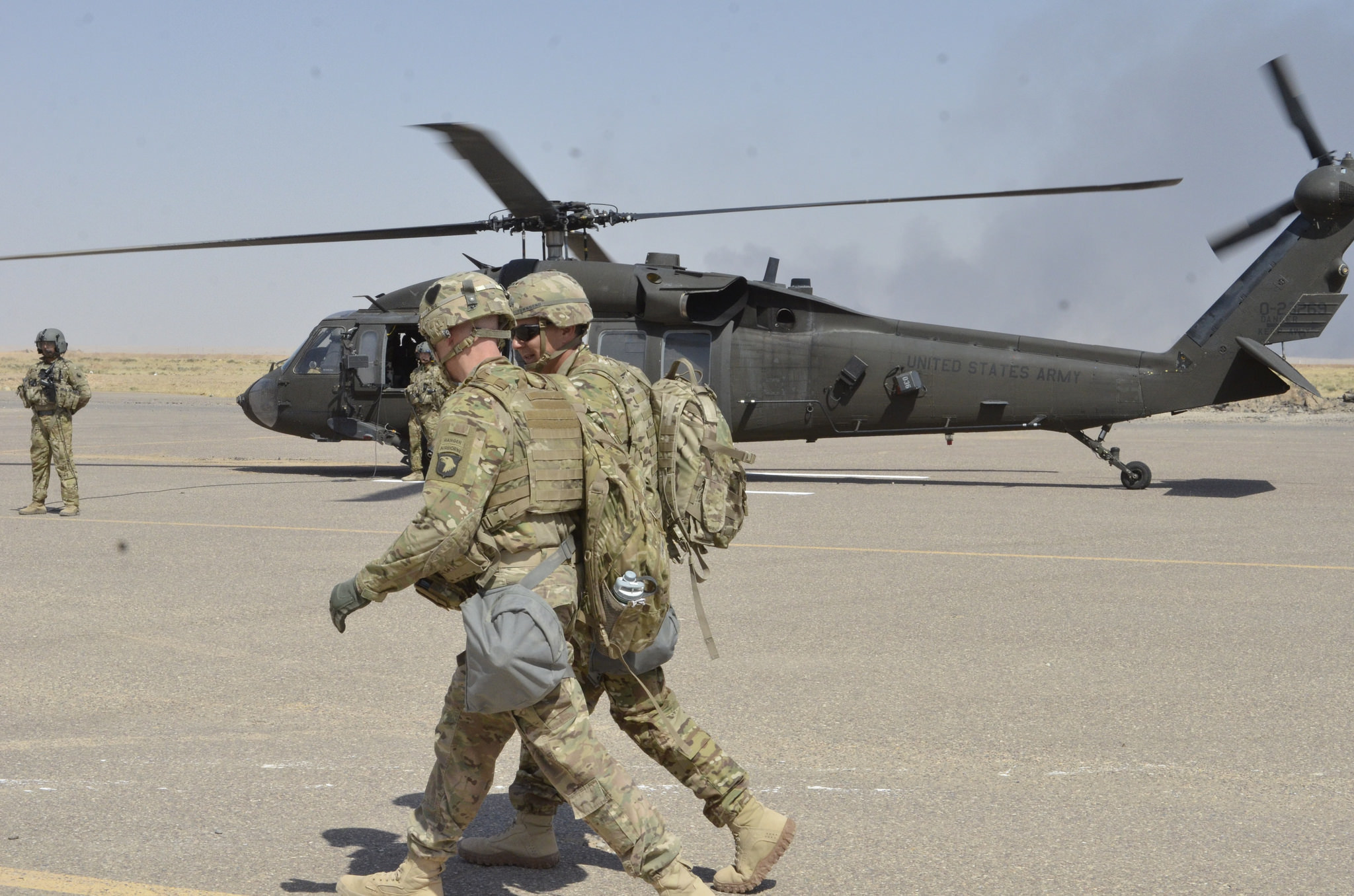
U.S. Lt. Gen. Stephen J. Townsend, commander of the Combined Joint Task Force, at Qayyarah Airfield West, 22 September 2016

An international coalition of 60 nations, led by the United States, supported Iraq's war against ISIL, providing logistical and air support, intelligence, and advice. The international coalition forces were headquartered 60 kilometres (37 mi) south of Mosul at Qayyarah Airfield West (or Q-West) in Qayyarah, which was retaken from ISIL in June. About 560 U.S. troops from the 101st Airborne Division were deployed to Q-West for the battle, including command and control elements, a security detachment, an airfield operations team, and logistics and communications specialists. The U.S. deployed HIMARS rocket launchers and M777 howitzers, manned by the 101st's 2nd Brigade Combat Team and the Golf Company, 526th Brigade Support Battalion. The British deployed several elements of the United Kingdom Special Forces as well as several L118 light guns. The French army deployed four CAESAR howitzers and 150 to 200 soldiers at Qayyarah, with 600 more French troops announced at the end of September.

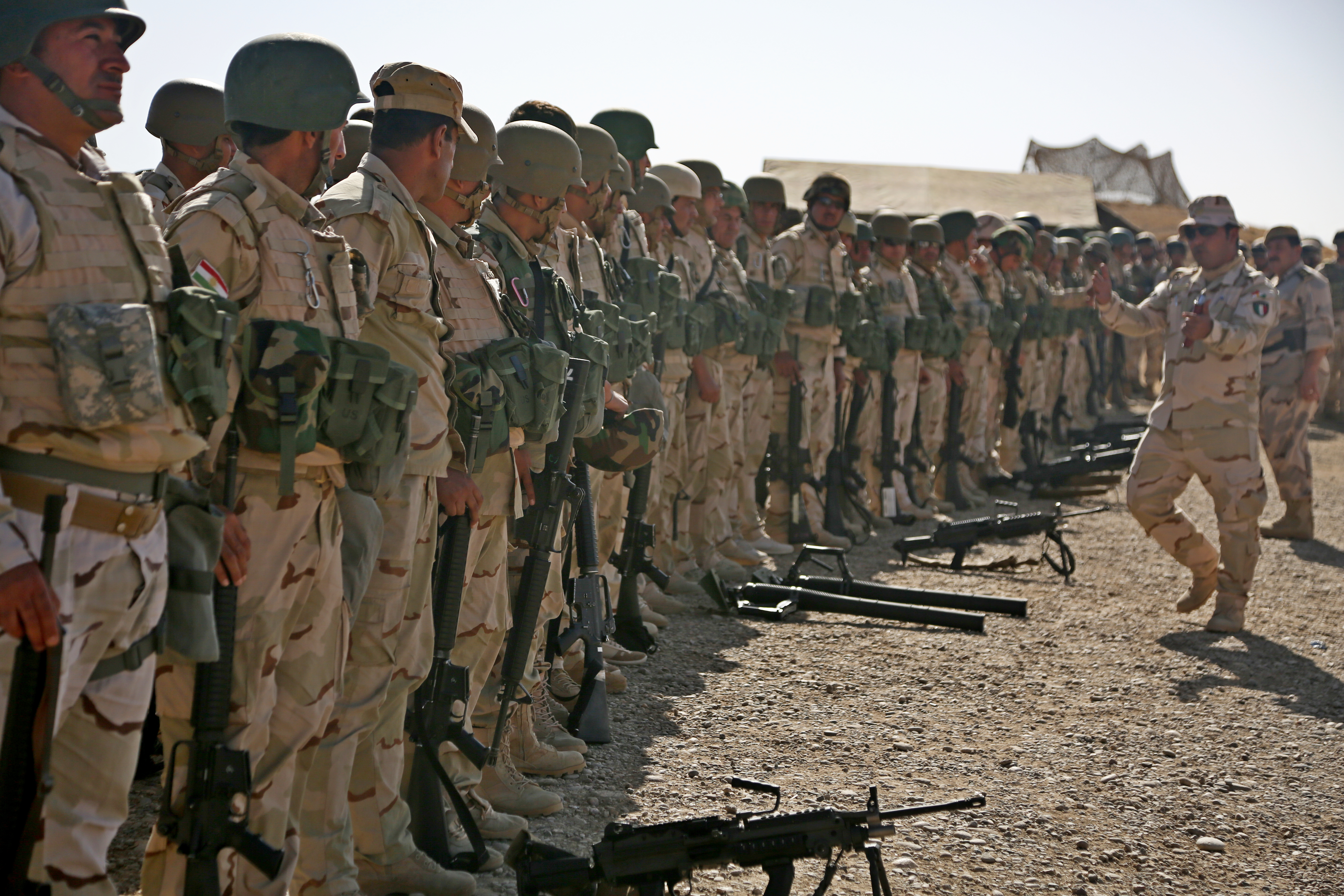
Peshmerga soldiers prepare to conduct a combined arms live-fire exercise with an Italian instructor near Erbil, on 12 October 2016.

An additional 150 French soldiers were in Erbil, east of Mosul, training Peshmerga. The aircraft carrier Charles de Gaulle, with a squadron of 24 Rafale M jets, was deployed from Toulon to the Syrian coast to support the operation against ISIL through airstrikes and reconnaissance missions; 12 other Rafale jets operated out of French Air Force bases in Jordan and the United Arab Emirates (UAE). Eighty Australian special forces soldiers and 210 Canadian Special Operations Forces Command (CANSOFCOM) soldiers were also deployed to assist the Peshmerga. In addition, the Canadian Forces 21 Electronic Warfare Regiment was also reported to be in the area, working to intercept and relay ISIL communications, while a Role 2 Canadian Army field hospital with 60 personnel was set up to treat Peshmerga casualties.

The Ba'ath loyalists group, known to be led by Saddam Hussein's former vice president Izzat Ibrahim al-Douri, issued a statement before the start of operations calling for the people of the city to start an uprising against ISIL and announced that they will fight the terrorist organization.

== The battle ==
=== October 2016: Phase One and initial advances ===
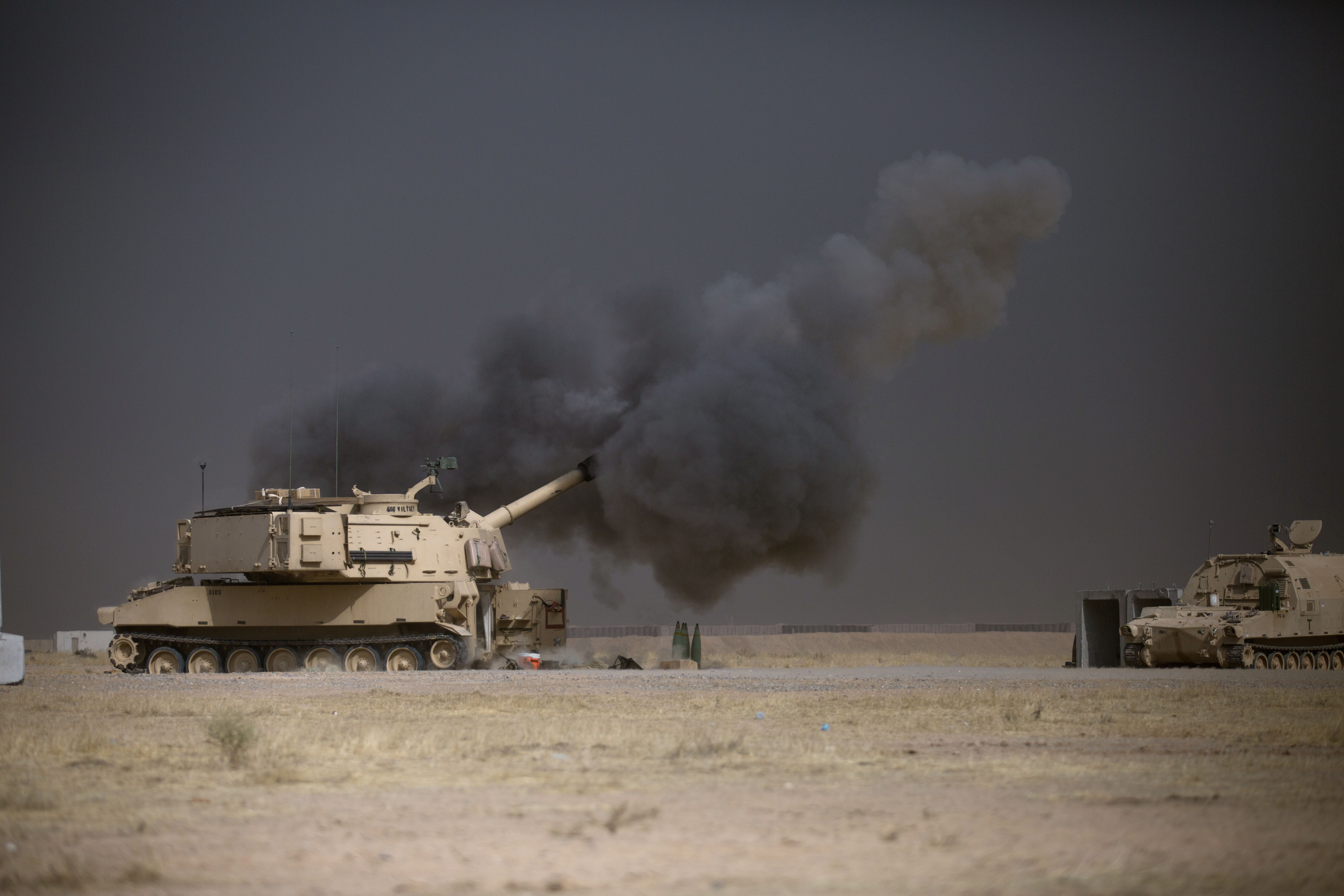
A U.S. Army M109A6 Paladin conducts a fire mission at Qayyarah Airfield West, in support of the Iraqi security forces' push toward Mosul, 17 October 2016.

On 16 October 2016, Iraqi Prime Minister Haider al-Abadi declared the beginning of the assault to recapture the city of Mosul. Officials reported howitzers firing on ISIL targets later that day. The Iraqi Armed Forces began the main assault on 17 October at approximately 6 a.m., local time, with shelling and the arrival of armoured vehicles to the front lines. The Peshmerga in the Khazir region, east of Mosul, started the ground assault by advancing on ISIL-held villages from three fronts, while Iraqi security forces advanced from the south. Iraqi troops advanced on the Bartella area east of Mosul while ISIL fighters fired mortars at Peshmerga. The President of KRG, Massoud Barzani, said that Peshmerga and Iraqi government fighters retook 200 square kilometres (77 square miles) from ISIL on the first day of fighting. Iraqi government officials reported inflicting severe casualties and destruction of equipment on ISIL forces in the Hamdaniya district southeast of Mosul. Wounded ISIL fighters reported to have been transferred to their de facto capital Raqqa, in Syria, for medical aid. Some ISIL fighters were reported shaving their beards and getting rid of their Afghan uniforms. Mosul's "Freedom Bridge" was destroyed in the fighting.

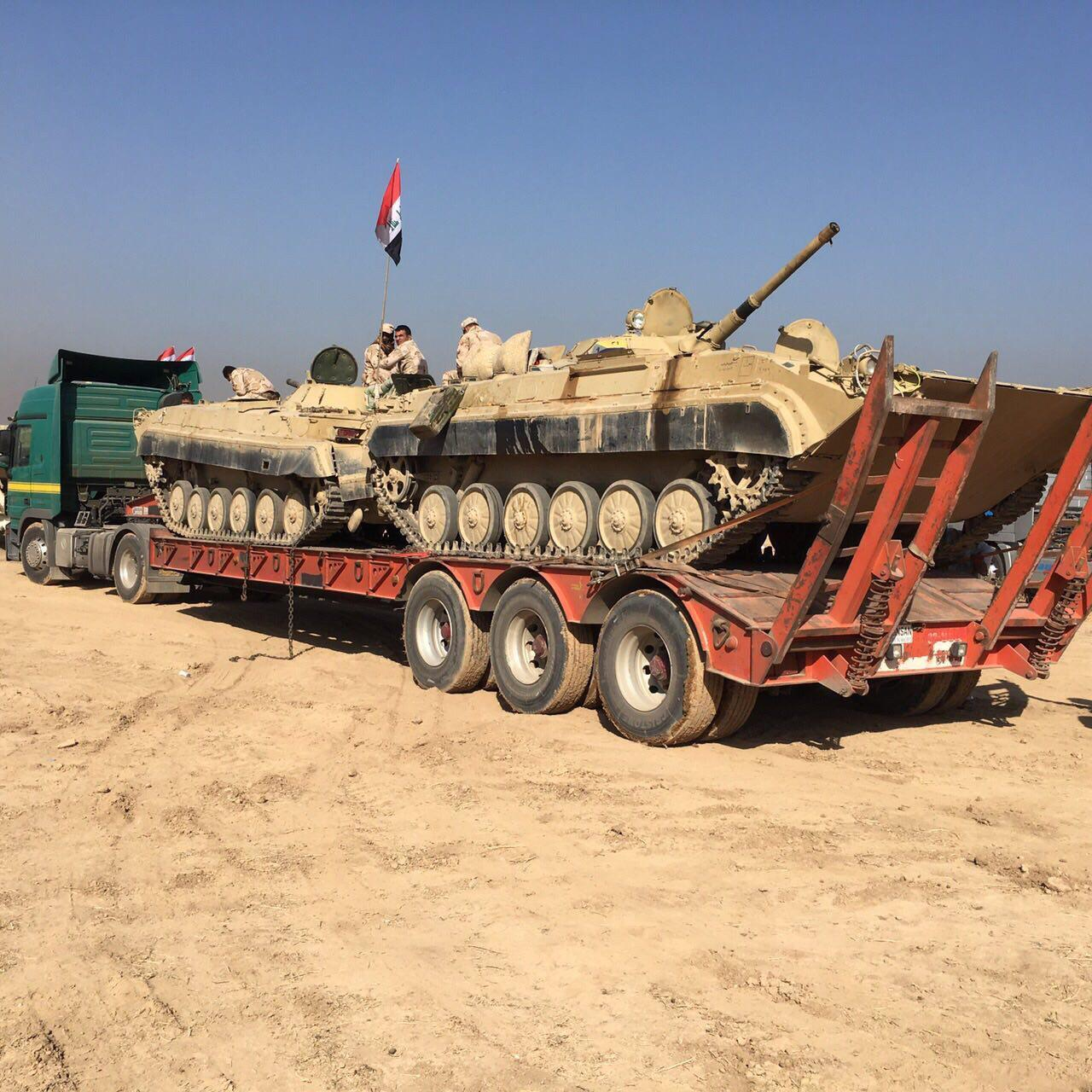
Iraqi security forces transport two BMP-1 infantry fighting vehicles to tactical assembly areas with assistance from the 313th Movement Control Battalion forward element, on 18 October 2016, near Makhmur, Iraq

On 18 October, the Iraqi government declared to have captured 20 villages from ISIL within 24 hours of fighting. On the southern front, Iraqi troops retook several villages near Qayyarah, including al-Sirt, Bajwaniya, al-Hud and al-Mashraf, and parts of the al-Hamdaniya District southeast of Mosul. as well as the al-Shura district. Iraqi Federal Police also regained control of 56 oilfields in the Qayyarah district. According to reports, the Peshmerga met little resistance on the eastern front, while Iraqi and PMF fighters coming from the south faced tougher resistance from ISIL. Iraqi Army forces stormed Qaraqosh (Bakhdida), once the largest Assyrian town in Iraq, and fought with ISIL fighters who remained holed up, while also Hammam al-'Alil. The Iraqi and Peshmerga advance had been slowed down during the same day due to suicide bombers, roadside IEDs and oil fires, and the allied forces were carrying out street-by-street search operations to clear out ISIL forces from the outskirts of Mosul city. The Peshmerga later paused their advance while the Iraqi Army continued its advance.

At this point in time, the coalition strategy was reported to be to encircle Mosul completely, after which Iraqi troops would advance into the city center. As the Iraqi Army advanced on Mosul, rebellion against ISIL broke out in the city, though ISIL forces put down the revolts within a couple of days.

The Iraqi Army resumed fighting on 19 October, surrounding Qaraqosh, while ISIL deployed snipers and car bombs. Lt. Gen. Qassim al-Maliki declared that Iraqi forces had captured 13 villages north and northeast of Al Quwayr, south of Mosul, and the Iraqi Army was reported to be within six kilometres (3.7 mi) of the outskirts of Mosul city. The village of Kani Harami was captured after heavy fighting in the morning with the militants retreating to Abbasiyah. A total of 22 towns were reported to have been captured, with 12 by the Peshmerga and 10 by the ISF. Nofal Hammadi, governor of the Nineveh Governorate, declared that 40% of the province had been retaken from ISIL.

The offensive to retake the town of Bashiqa northeast of Mosul was delayed due to lack of logistical support. The international coalition's commander Gary Voelsky also stated that a majority of ISIL leaders were fleeing Mosul, and predicted that foreign fighters would form the majority of militants remaining in the city.

The fighting intensified on 20 October. A large convoy of Golden Division arrived at positions retaken by the Peshmerga forces, and they also captured Bartella. According to Maj. Gen. Maan al-Saadi of the Iraqi Army, 200 ISIL fighters were killed in the fight for Bartella. The Peshmerga and NPF announced a "large-scale operation" to the north and northeast of Mosul, to retake the Assyrian towns of Tesqopa and Bashiqa. During the day, the Peshmerga captured six villages, including four on the Bashiqa front line and two on the Nawaran front, while entering another four villages. The Peshmerga briefly captured the village of Tiz Khirab but were forced to withdraw. On the southern front, Iraqi forces resumed their push north after a brief pause and recaptured six villages east of Qayyarah.

ISIL committed another war crime by setting the Al-Mishraq sulfur plant on fire, causing two deaths and nearly 1,000 hospitalizations from sulfur fume inhalation. The group was also reported to be digging trenches to slow the advancement of coalition troops.

On 21 October, ISIL launched multiple attacks in Kirkuk to divert military resources. Multiple explosions and gun battles were reported in the city, mostly centered on a government compound, and a senior Peshmerga commander said that the attackers had entered by posing as IDPs. Meanwhile, Iraqi government forces reported that they had retaken 2 more villages south of Mosul and killed 15 terrorists.

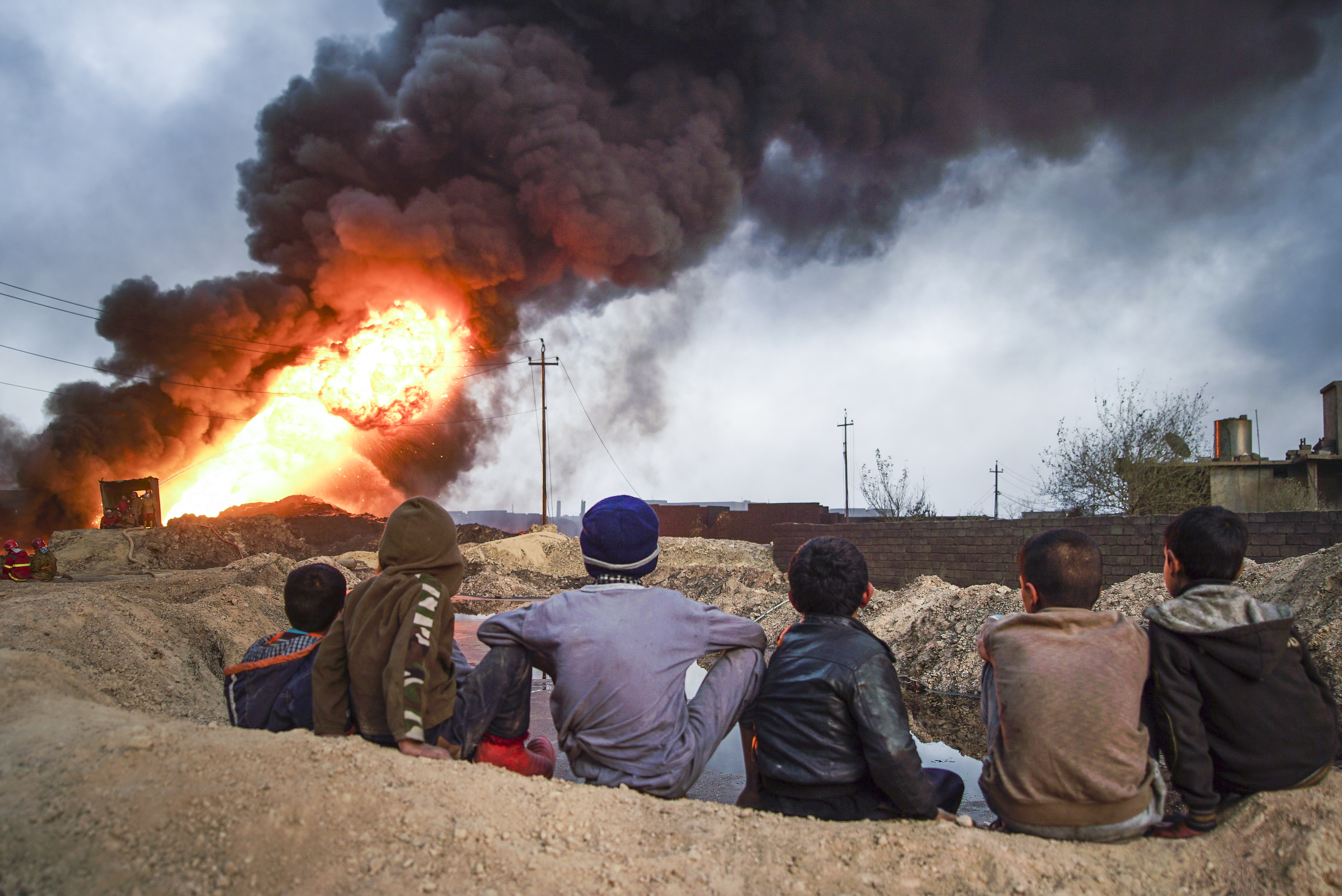
Local boys observing cityscape of Qayyarah town on fire

On 22 October, Iraqi police declared that ISIL's attack on Kirkuk had been repelled and that all the attackers had been killed or had blown themselves up. Iraqi officials also stated that 80 people were killed in Kirkuk, primarily Kurdish security forces, and about 170 wounded; 56 ISIL militants were also killed. A reporter of Türkmeneli TV also died in the attack. while at least seven journalists were wounded. On the same day, Iraqi forces launched a large-scale offensive began to retake the Assyrian town of Bakhdida, which had remained under ISIL control after several days of fighting. Iraqi troops also advanced on the town of Tel Keppe, to the north of Mosul. On 23 October, the Peshmerga General Command also stated that the Peshmerga had cordoned off eight villages and had secured a significant stretch of the Bashiqa-Mosul highway, coming within nine kilometres (5.6 mi) of the city. ISIL increased its counter-attacks in order to distract the pro-government advancing towards Mosul. In addition to the attack on Kirkuk on 21 October, ISIL fighters struck Ar-Rutbah in Anbar Province, as well as Sinjar.

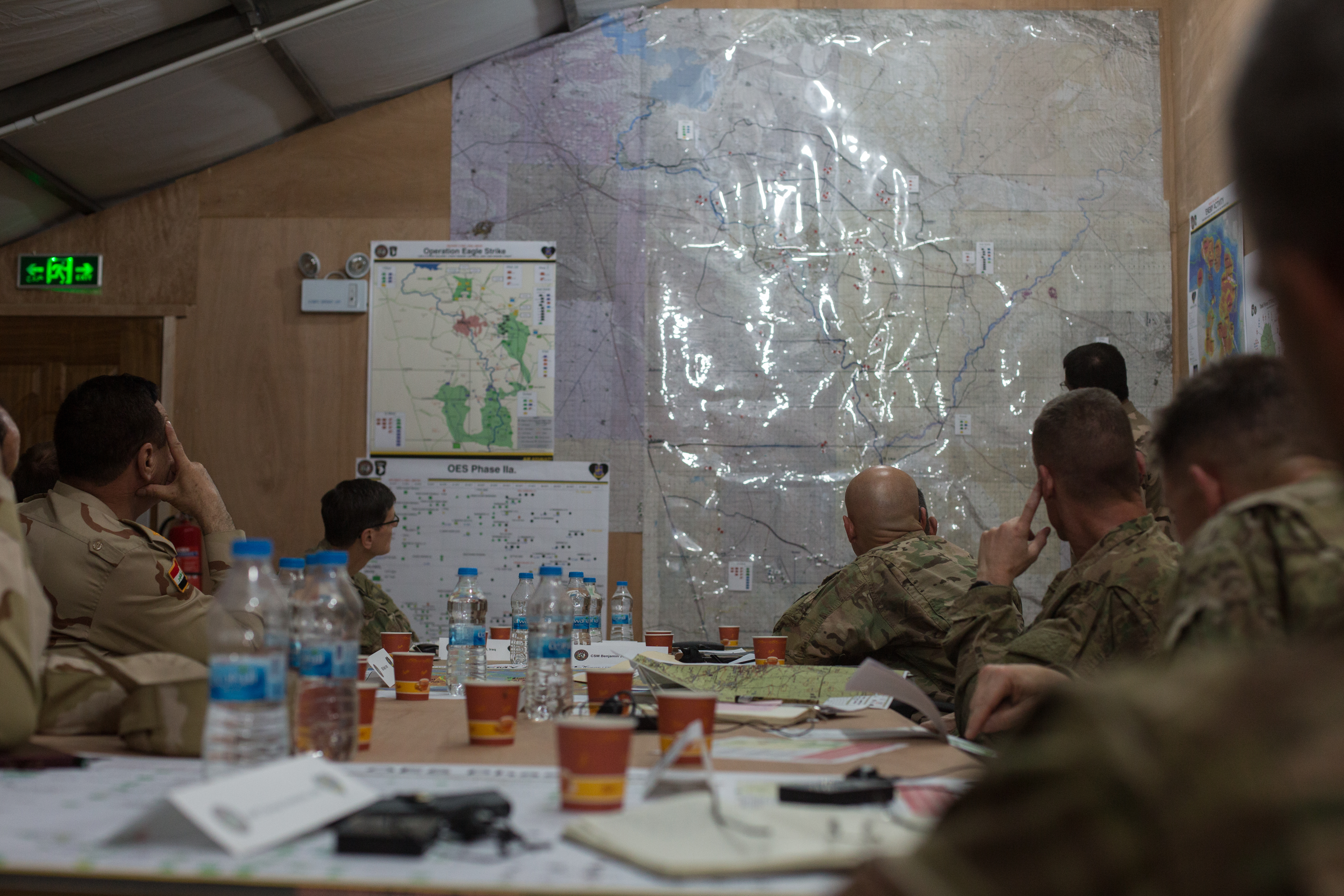
Iraqi and U.S. military leaders discuss battle plans at Qayyarah Airfield West, 25 October.

By 24 October, nearly 800 ISIL militants had been killed while 78 villages were reported to have been retaken from the group. The attack on Kirkuk was also brought to an end on the same day, with 74 militants being killed and others, including the leader of the attackers, being arrested. On 25 October, Iraqi Special Operations Forces came within two kilometres (1.2 mi) of the city and paused their advance to wait for reinforcements. On 26 October, Iraqi forces faced heavy resistance from ISIL as they attempted to clear the militants from villages in Shora, south of Mosul. Hundreds of ISIL suicide bombers were also reported to have been sent from Syria to defend Mosul. Meanwhile, Peshmerga forces captured the village of Derk, 12 kilometres (7.5 mi) northeast of Mosul, where they discovered a large ISIL tunnel containing a large cache of weapons. On 27 October, the head of the United States Central Command, Gen. Joseph Votel, estimated that 800–900 ISIL militants had been killed in the battle. On 28 October, Iraqi forces recaptured the town of Al-Shura, south of Mosul. while joint Iraqi-Peshmerga forces captured Fadiliya, which lies just four kilometres away from Mosul. Meanwhile, the UN stated that ISIL had taken tens of thousands of civilians to use as human shields in Mosul, including at least 5,000 families from around Al-Shura and 2,210 families from the Nimrud area of Hamdaniya. Those who refused to go were executed.

On 29 October, the PMF launched an offensive towards the west of Mosul, with the aim of capturing the villages west of Mosul and reaching the town of Tal Afar, in order to prevent ISIL fighters from retreating into neighboring Syria or reinforcing their defense of Mosul. The PMF had been tasked with recapturing around 14,000 square kilometres of territory from ISIL, though they stated that they would not enter Mosul city itself. Meanwhile, the Iraqi Army and PMF captured 15 villages from ISIL.

On 30 October, the Peshmerga had captured six more villages to north and east of Mosul, and had seized control of several major roads and landmarks, and they declared to have captured 500 square kilometres of territory since the operation began. On the same day, the PMF stated that they had captured eight more villages to the southwest of Mosul. On 31 October, a major Iraqi operation was launched on Bazwaya, to the east of Mosul, capturing the town along with several nearby villages, after coming under heavy fire. After capturing Bazwaya, ISOF were less than one mile (1.6 km) from Mosul. Several Iraqi military officials stated that ISOF would soon begin its push into Mosul city. Meanwhile, the U.S.-led coalition stated that they would target ISIL militants from the air if they attempted to flee the city, though the U.S. Department of Defense stated that hundreds of militants were believed to have already escaped. Iraqi Prime Minister Haider al-Abadi meanwhile called on ISIL fighters in Mosul to surrender.

=== November 2016: Entering East Mosul, reaching Tal Afar ===
On 1 November, the operation to enter Mosul city began at dawn. Iraq’s elite counter-terrorism forces (ISOF) began their assault in Mosul's eastern Karama district, with artillery, tank and machine-gun fire on ISIL positions as they prepared the larger push into the city. Airstrikes by the U.S.-led coalition targeted ISIL positions, and ISIL started tire fires to reduce visibility. Heavy fighting occurred in the Gogjali district, at the gate of the entrance to eastern Mosul, where ISIL militants used car bombs and sniper fire to try to halt the advance. The Golden Division entered Mosul's city limits that afternoon, engaging in street fights with ISIL militants. Shortly afterward, the Iraqi Army announced that they had captured Mosul's state television building on the city's left bank. The Gogjali district was reported to be under Iraqi government control by the evening, while the Iraqi Army's 9th Division and 3rd Brigade had entered the neighborhood of Judaydat al-Mufti on the left bank. The Iraqi war media office stated that Iraqi government forces suffered no casualties during the assault. Meanwhile, Iraqi government forces captured two villages on the northern front.

On 2 November, ISOF continued fighting the remaining ISIL fighters in the eastern section of Gogjali, though Iraqi troops were forced to hold their positions in eastern Mosul, as poor weather conditions were limiting visibility for drones and aircraft, preventing them from advancing. Meanwhile, eight militants were killed in Mosul by Iraqi forces. On the same day, the PMU announced that it had captured 115 square kilometres that day after fierce fighting with ISIL, including six villages, and had surrounded three ISIL-held villages. They also claimed that they had reached a highway to the southwest of Mosul and had cut the first supply line to Mosul from Raqqa. In the southern front, the Iraqi Army launched an offensive in the morning to recapture Hamam al-Alil and engaged in heavy fighting with ISIL, while the Iraqi Federal Police captured two villages in the south.

On 3 November, the Iraqi Army's 9th Armored Division was reported to have entered the neighborhood of al-Intisar in eastern Mosul. while Mosul's Fifth Bridge, located over the Tigris river, was destroyed by airstrikes. U.S. and Iraqi authorities stated the offensive was "ahead of schedule", while Brigadier Saad Maan stated that the priority of protecting civilian lives and infrastructure would possibly slow their advance into the city. On 4 November, the Iraqi Army recaptured six districts in Mosul, including 90% of the eastern district of al-Zahra. However, they were forced to withdraw from Karama district because of heavy resistance. Clashes continued into 5 November, with clashes being the most intense in the neighborhood of al-Bakr. The eastern neighborhoods of Kirkukli and al-Zahra in the east and Al-Tahrir in the northeast were under Iraqi control, while the southern neighborhoods of Qudes and Karama reportedly remained under ISIL control. Fighting resumed in the Gogjali district, after ISIL militants emerged from tunnels during the night. The Iraqi Army continued its assault on three fronts to Hamam al-Alil, with Iraqi forces retaking the town by nighttime, though fighting would continue for another two days. On 6 November, Iraqi forces in the southwestern front stated that they were 4 kilometres (2.5 mi) from Mosul International Airport, after taking control of Hamam al-Alil on the previous day. They also stormed the Al-Sada district, their first entrance into northern Mosul.

On 7 November, the Peshmerga, backed by coalition airstrikes, launched an offensive from three fronts in the morning to take the town of Bashiqa, which was still held by ISIL and had been surrounded for about two weeks. About 100 to 200 ISIL militants were estimated to be left in the town. In the early afternoon, the Iraqi troops also advanced on the town of Tel Keppe, north of Mosul, besieging the town. The town of Bashiqa was reported to be fully under Peshmerga control, though an ISIL pocket remained under siege in the town until the end of the month. On the southern front, Hamam al-Alil was fully captured by pro-government forces, after two days of clearing out the remaining ISIL fighters. In eastern Mosul, the ISOF surrounded the neighborhoods of Karama, Malayyin al-Salasa, Shquq Khazraa, Zahra, Karkuli, Aden and Zahabi. The Iraqi Army's 9th armored division and the 3rd Brigade captured the village of Manarat Shabak, east of the city, and made an incursion into the eastern Mosul neighborhoods of Hay Intisar, Judaydah al-Mufti, and Hay Shaima. Meanwhile, the Iraqi Federal Police captured two villages near Hammam Al-Alil. On 8 November, on the western front, PMU forces were reported to have advanced to a distance of 25 km towards the strategically important Tal Afar military airbase, south of the city of Tal Afar. On 9 November, the ISOF captured the majority of the Intisar district in southern Mosul, while ISIL had reportedly deployed armed child soldiers in Mosul. On 10 November, in eastern Mosul, the Golden Division, as well as elements of the 9th Division, were reported to be regrouping and clearing neighborhoods once occupied by ISIL, as well as screening residents fleeing from Mosul for any militants hiding among them. On the southern front, pro-government forces advanced towards the ancient city of Nimrud.

A coalition airstrike on an ISIL headquarters near Mosul on 10 November 2016

On 11 November, Iraqi forces on the southern front were preparing to advance up the western bank of the Tigris River toward Mosul International Airport. In eastern Mosul, Iraqi forces launched a new offensive to regain control of the neighborhood of Karkukli, while Iraqi anti-terror units announced they had entered the Qadesiyya neighborhood. On 12 November, heavy clashes broke out in the al-Salam neighborhood of east Mosul. Iraqi Army announced that it had captured al-Arbajiya district and was clearing the adjacent al-Qadisiya al-Thaniya district. They also reached the Palestine neighborhood in southeast Mosul and were engaged in battle with ISIL in the Quds neighborhood. The PMU announced that the Sinjar Resistance Units (YBŞ), an allied group, had started the operation to capture the villages south of Sinjar from ISIL. On 13 November, Iraqi forces recaptured the ancient Assyrian city of Nimrud, as well as the adjacent modern town. Iraqi forces also captured the Karkojli neighborhood in eastern Mosul. On 14 November, thirty ISIL fighters, including senior leaders, were killed as PMU forces captured the village of al-Abbas; the PMU also captured two more villages. Pro-government forces on the southern front captured the village of Bo Youssef and were three kilometres (2 mi) from Mosul airport. Meanwhile, ISIL launched three mustard gas attacks on Qayyarah, killing seven people.

Map of Mosul control lines around 22 November 2016

On 15 November, troops of the Golden Division began storming areas in northern and eastern Mosul, including the neighborhoods of al-Akhaa, al-Bakr, and al-Hadbaa. On the Western front, the Badr Organization announced that it had captured two villages and advanced ten kilometres in the western axis of the offensive. On 16 November, the PMF took control of Tal Afar military airbase, to the northwest of Mosul city. On 18 November, the PMU attacked more villages in the vicinity of Tal Afar, in an area infamous for Sunni Islamist militancy and outstanding support for ISIL among the population. PMF said it had already captured over 16 villages in the surrounding area during the preceding days. On 22 November, four of the five Tigris bridges in Mosul were struck by Coalition airstrikes within the past 48 hours. On the same day, U.S. Special Forces captured four Islamic State commanders near the town of Al-Ba'aj, far to the west, near the Syrian border.

On 23 November, to the west of Tal Afar, the PMF reported cutting the road between Sinjar and Tal Afar, with their Shi'a component groups advancing from the South linking up with the Sinjar Resistance Units and Êzîdxan Women's Units to the North, thus completing the encirclement of the Mosul pocket. On 30 November, the PMF said that they captured 12 villages from ISIL in the Tal Afar area, within the past five days. By 30 November, the Peshmerga had cleared the remaining ISIL snipers from the town, though they continued to clear the mines and explosives left behind by ISIL.

At the end of November, the Iraqi military assessed that it had taken control of 19 neighborhoods in eastern Mosul during the month, about somewhat less than 30 percent of the area of Mosul east of the Tigris. While the "Golden Division" Special Operations Forces persistently advanced into East Mosul, the 9th Division took one neighborhood in the southeast, the 16th Division had not yet breached the Mosul city limits from the north, and the 15th Division, advancing from the southwest, was still several kilometres away from western Mosul.

=== December 2016: Advancing towards the Syrian border and launch of Phase Two ===
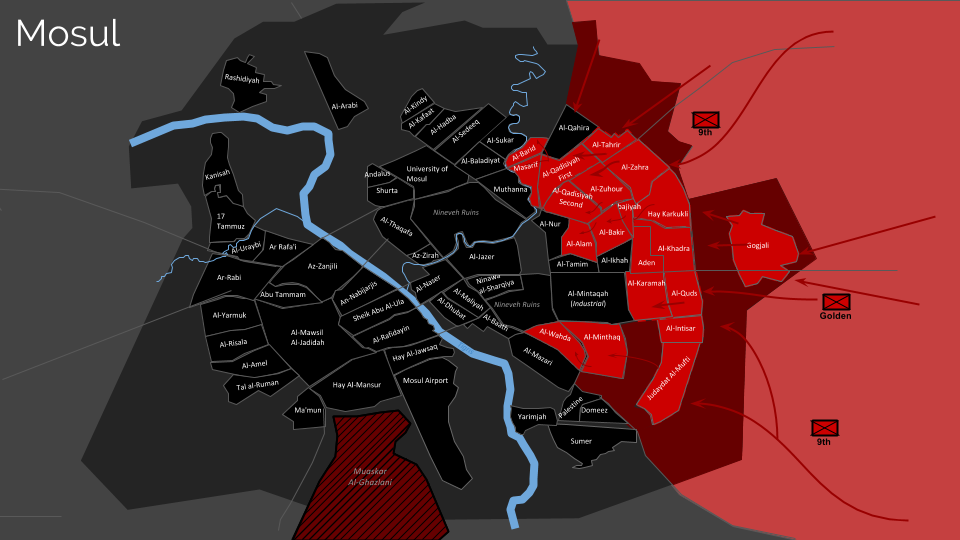
Battle situation as of 7 December 2016

Twenty airstrikes by the US-led coalition were heard on the morning of 6 December, following an assault on the city's strategic main (old) bridge that was held by ISIL. In the overnight hours, ISIL launched a counter-attack in the southeastern area of Mosul, near al-Salam. On the same day, the PMU stated that it had captured the southern section of Tal Abta. Following the overnight ISIL attack, Iraqi forces continued to secure the al-Salam area on 7 December, capturing al-Salam hospital. However, ISIL recaptured the hospital after a counter-attack, which destroyed or disabled 20 Iraqi vehicles. On 9 December, Iraqi Joint Operations Command announced that they had captured the three east Mosul districts of Saha, Adel, and Tahrir, adding that Iraqi forces had captured 27 districts of Mosul, with clashes ongoing in 4 districts. On 11 December, the CTS forces mentioned that they had the al-Nour neighborhood of east Mosul.

On 13 December, CTS commander Abdul Wahab al-Saedi stated that there were only 6 districts left to be captured by the CTS forces in East Mosul, and that they had already captured 32 of them. While the PMF to the west continued clearing villages in the desert region of the ISIL heartland in the Nineveh Governorate, it was reported on the same day that the Badr militia was targeting villages around Tal Afar to "surround Daesh and tighten the noose around them", while Kata'ib Hezbollah advanced further west towards the Syrian border. On 15 December, CTS commander Abdul Ghani al-Assadi announced that the first phase of retaking the eastern shores of the city was completed, with CTS forces capturing 40 out of the 56 eastern districts.

On 16 December, the PMF captured the Tel Abtah district, home to almost 50,000 people and a major strategic ISIL stronghold, and advanced on more villages to the south and southwest of Tal Afar. On 18 December, the 9th Division, with the assistance of CTS, started attacking al-Wehda district of east Mosul, in order to regain control of al-Salam hospital. On 19 December, Iraqi forces stormed into the al-Mazare' area, after retaking large parts of al-Wahda in southeastern Mosul, and also killed 14 ISIL fighters, including four suicide bombers. On 21 December, U.S. Air Force Brigadier General Matthew Isler announced that pro-government forces had entered a planned operational refit, which included repairing vehicles, re-supplying ammunition and preparing for the next stage of the battle. He also stated that they had captured more than a quarter of the city.

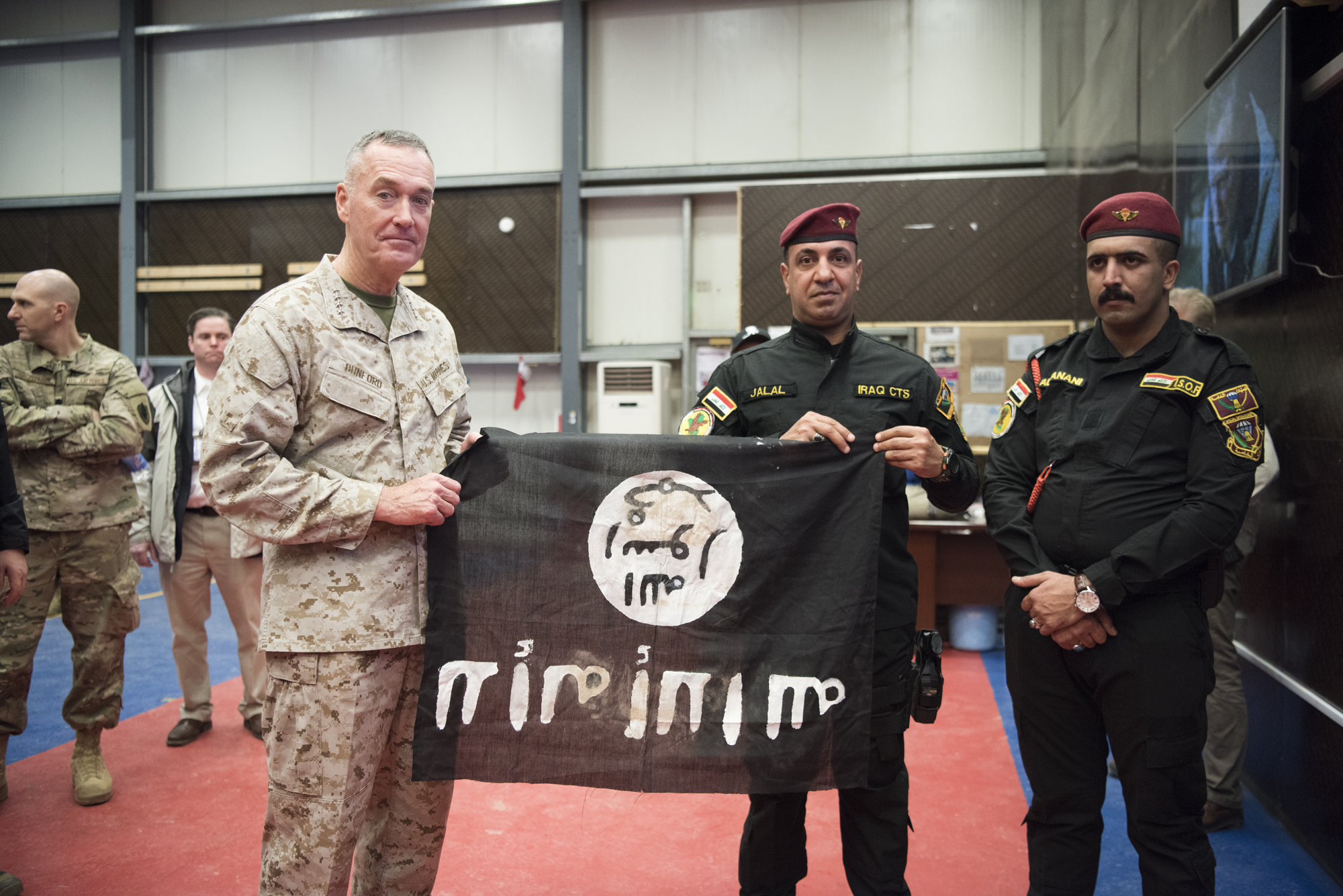
ISOF posing with Marine Gen. Joseph Dunford and holding the ISIL flag upside down.

On 23 December, the Iraqi Army captured the Mosul Police Academy headquarters in Al-Qahira district, which was their first major advance since the suspension of military operations a week earlier. On 24 December, U.S. Army Colonel Brett G. Sylvia stated that American soldiers assisting Iraqi forces would be embedded more extensively and would partner with additional formations. Iraqi Prime Minister Haider al-Abadi stated that Iraqi forces were in control of over a third of Mosul, while Iraqi Joint Operations Command spokesperson Yahia Rasoul stated that Iraqi forces controlled 44% of Nineveh Governate. He added that CTS forces controlled 40 districts in east Mosul, while the Iraqi Army's 9th Battalion held six districts. On 25 December, the CTS reportedly stormed into the Al-Quds district, later in the day. On 26 December, Commander of Nineveh Operations Major General Najim al-Jabouri announced that new military reinforcements had arrived in the Mosul neighborhoods retaken by Iraqi forces. On 27 December, the ISIL-run Amaq News Agency stated that the anti-ISIL coalition had destroyed the Old Bridge, the last functioning bridge in Mosul. The US-led Coalition stated that it had disabled a Mosul bridge with airstrikes, without providing further details.

On 29 December, Iraqi forces launched the second phase of the battle, pushing from three directions into the remaining eastern Mosul districts. Iraqi soldiers and Federal Police entered about half a dozen southeastern districts, while the CTS advanced in the al-Quds and Karama districts. In the third front, Iraqi soldiers also pushed toward the northern city limits. An ISIL headquarters in al-Thobat district was reportedly destroyed in coalition airstrikes, killing 12 militants. Later in the day, the commander of the operation declared that they had captured two villages to the north of Mosul, killing 70 militants. Iraqi forces had captured half of the al-Quds district by early afternoon. On 30 December, Iraqi security forces advanced in several areas. In the northern front, the 16th Division stormed the Habdaa district while also trying to cut off the supply lines to Tel Kayf. Ammar al-Haweidi, who was an elite leader of ISIL, was reported to have been killed by the Iraqi Federal Police. On 31 December, heavy clashes occurred at the southeastern and northern fronts of Mosul. An Iraqi Army officer deployed in the southeastern front reported that their advances had slowed down, due to heavy clashes and difficulty in differentiating between civilians and militants. Iraqi forces on the northern front advanced towards the periphery of Mosul, with an officer stating that heavy clashes were ongoing in the Argoob area. The CTS destroyed four VBIEDs, when ISIL tried to attack them in the street linking al-Ta'mim neighborhood and the garage area in east Mosul.

=== January 2017: Capturing east Mosul ===
Iraqi forces continued their advance on 1 January 2017, capturing a part of the Karama district, taking near complete control of Intissar and Siha districts, and clearing the Salam district. The CTS linked up with the Rapid Response Division during the day at the edge of al-Intissar and al-Quds, capturing more than 60 percent of east Mosul. Later that day, Iraqi forces captured the Yunus al-Sabaawi and Yafa districts in the southeastern part of the city, and also completely captured al-Intissar, as well as the districts of al-Malayeen, al-Kindi, and al-Arabi al-Thania. Iraqi Federal Police also captured the Gogjali-Intsar road and the strategic No. 60 Street to the southeast of Mosul. On 3 January, Iraqi forces stormed three districts. Iraqi Air Force airstrikes destroyed the office of ISIL's hisbah police located on Mosul-Tel Afar road, and several warfare utilities of the group. The Iraqi Federal Police also destroyed the headquarters of Jund al-Khilafa (Soldiers of the Caliphate), an ISIL explosives factory, and a drone headquarters in al-Mithaq district. Later that day, the CTS captured the Karama industrial neighborhood, the industrial district, the Karama Silo (a flour mill), and a Mercedes Company building. Iraqi forces later captured the area of exhibitions and the commercial complex to the south of the Ta'mim district, along with the Al-Hay al-Senai and al-Mithaq districts, as well as the Maaridh area to the east of Mosul. On 4 January, Iraqi forces cleared the Mithaq district and advanced in al-Wahda. The United Nations stated that civilian casualties had started increasing as Iraqi forces advanced in the city. The Federal Police and 9th Division captured Wahda after heavy clashes, bringing them closer to the city center, while ISIL counter-attacks in southeastern Mosul were repelled. Iraqi forces later captured the al-Moallemin and Sumer districts, as well as the Mosul-Kirkuk road. On the same day, the United States Department of Defense and the anti-ISIL Coalition stated that American advisers had entered Mosul with Iraqi forces.

On 5 January, Lt.-Gen. Talib Shaghati stated that Iraqi forces had captured about 65–70% of east Mosul. An ISIL attack on the PMU near Tal Afar was repelled. The Federal Police announced that 1,700 ISIL fighters had been killed in the second phase. General Raed Shaker Jawdat stated that the group's headquarters in Nineveh province had been destroyed and that Iraqi forces had captured eight districts in the second phase, thus bringing the entire southeastern section of Mosul under their control. He also stated that all the remaining districts in east Mosul had been surrounded and would be stormed soon. On 6 January, the CTS stormed the al-Muthanna district, during an overnight raid across the al-Khawsar river, with the CTS later driving ISIL out of the district. This advance marked the first time that Iraqi forces had entered Mosul from the north. The CTS also launched an assault on the Hadbaa apartment complex on the northern front, sparking heavy clashes. On 7 January, Iraqi forces came within several hundred metres of the Tigris river. The CTS captured al-Gharfan district (previously known as al-Baath) and entered Wahda district, later capturing a hospital complex in Wahda. Meanwhile, a spokesman of the anti-ISIL coalition stated that ISIL had deliberately damaged the fourth bridge in Mosul as Iraqi forces advanced. Iraqi forces also captured ISIL's command center and two prisons, as well as Rifaq, the Atibaa 1st and Atibaa 2nd districts, and the Hadbaa residential complex. On 8 January, ISIL attacked CTS troops advancing towards the Sukkar and Baladiyat districts, though the attacks were repelled with the help of coalition warplanes, killing dozens of militants. The 9th Division and Federal Police had launched an attack on the Sumer and Domiz districts, on the southeastern front. The CTS spokesman said that Iraqi forces had reached the Tigris river for the first time in the offensive, advancing towards the eastern side of the fourth bridge. Brett McGurk, USA's envoy to the anti-ISIL coalition, stated that ISIL's defenses in eastern Mosul were showing signs of collapse. Meanwhile, the PMU repelled an ISIL attack near Adaya, located to the west of Mosul.

On 9 January, the CTS captured the Baladiyat district on the eastern front, while the Federal Police and Iraqi Army captured the Domiz and Palestine districts on the southeastern front. ISIL was still in control of the city's water stations, and was reported to have cut the water supply to more than 30 districts that had been captured by Iraqi forces. Meanwhile, the ISOF surrounded the University of Mosul. On 10 January, CTS forces captured the Sukkar and al-Dhubbat districts, while advancing in the Siddeeq and al-Maliyah districts. Several governmental offices, including the communication complex, provincial electricity department, and a security headquarters were also captured by the CTS. In response to the advances, ISIL blew up two bridges to prevent Iraqi forces from attacking western Mosul. On the southeastern front, the Federal Police and Iraqi Army pushed further into al-Salam, Palestine, Sumer, Yarimja and Sahiron districts, while on the northern front, the Iraqi Army advanced further into al-Hadbaa while capturing northern part of Sabaa Nisaan. On 12 January, the CTS captured the 7th Nissan and Sadeeq districts, successfully linking up with Iraqi Army forces advancing in the Hadbaa district. CTS Spokesman al-Numan stated that Iraqi forces were now in control of about 85% of eastern Mosul. Around the same time, the Rapid Response Division advanced in the Sumer and Sahiroun districts, capturing those districts later in the day. Iraqi forces also captured the al-Salam district. Meanwhile, the PMU captured 3 villages near Tel Abta.

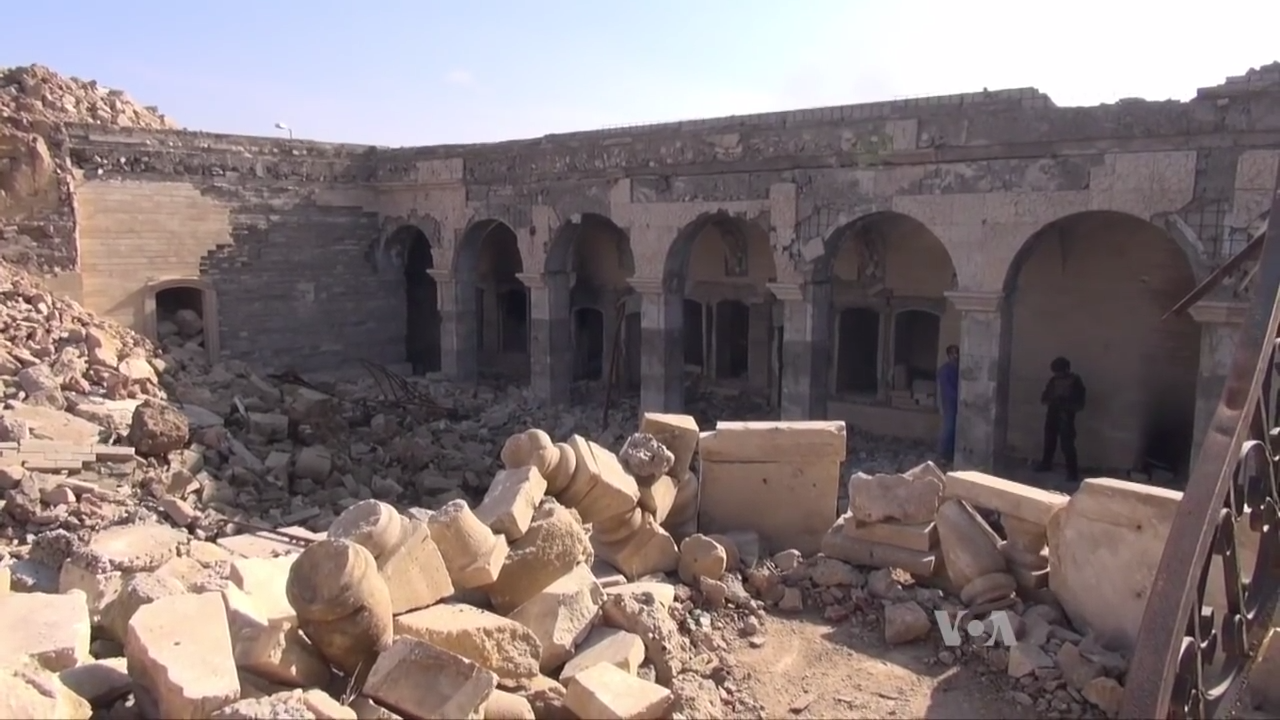
The ruins of the Nabi Yunus mosque after it was captured by Iraqi forces

On 13 January, the CTS reached the second bridge of the city, also called the "Freedom Bridge." In response, ISIL had destroyed all five bridges of the city, in order to slow the Iraqi advance towards western Mosul. The CTS later reached the Old Bridge of Mosul, also known as the "Iron Bridge", and stormed the University of Mosul, capturing a part of the university complex later in the day. The CTS also captured the al-Kafa'at district on eastern front as well as al-Sadriya, al-Naser, and al-Faisaliyah in the central part of East Mosul. Iraqi Army forces also captured the Hadbaa district during the day, and the CTS captured a government complex, which included the Nineveh Governorate administration and council buildings. On 14 January, the Rapid Response Division captured the Yarimja area and a field hospital that ISIL was using. The Federal Police also captured the highway between Mosul and Kirkuk. Iraqi forces later completely captured the University of Mosul, in addition to the eastern side of a third bridge. On 15 January, Iraqi forces carried out a sweeping operation in the University of Mosul to clear out any remaining hiding militants, while continuing their advance along the Tigris river. The operation command later announced that the Iraqi Army had captured al-Kafaat Thani (Second) district on the northern front, while CTS had captured Andalus on the eastern front. ON 16 January, clashes occurred in the Shurta and Andalus districts. By this point, Iraqi forces had taken complete control of the river banks in the south. During the day, the Iraqi Army captured the Kindi and Qairawan districts, while the CTS captured Jammasa. The CTS later captured the Nabi Yunus area, including the Nabi Yunus shrine.

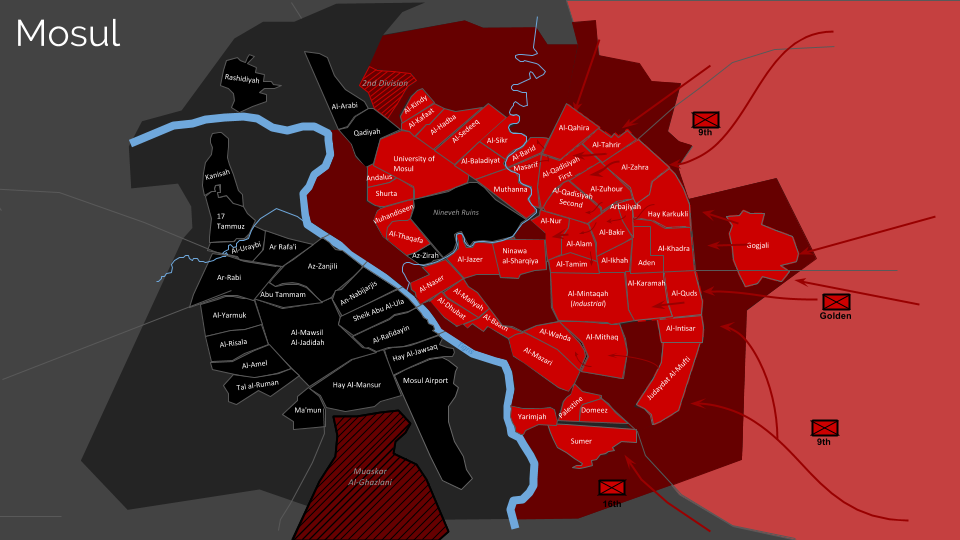
The battle situation on 17 January 2017

The coalition forces bomb an ISIL-held building near Mosul on 18 January 2017.

On 17 January, the CTS was in complete control of Shurta and Andalus, as well as the al-Muhandiseen district, and pushed into the Eastern Nineveh and Souq al-Ghanam districts. The CTS later captured the Nineveh al-Sharqiya, Bab-Shams, and Souq al-Ghanam districts on the eastern front, as well as the Nu'maniya and Uttshana districts, while storming the adjacent al-Jazair district. Meanwhile, on the northern front, the Iraqi Army captured the Kindi military base, the former headquarters of the 2nd Division, as well as the nearby al-Kindi facility. The CTS also captured the Al Jazair, Al Derkazlih, Al Seuis, and Sanharib districts during the day, along with the Grand Mosque of the city. Iraqi forces also succeeded in capturing all five bridges of the city during the day, as well as the Zaraei district. United States Air Force Colonel John Dorrian stated during the day that Iraqi forces were now in control of 85–90% of east Mosul. On the same day, Iraqi Prime Minister Haider al-Abadi stated that Iraqi forces had begun moving against ISIL in western Mosul. On 18 January, Lieutenant-General Talib Shaghati announced that the CTS had captured all the districts of east Mosul they were tasked with taking, and that Iraqi forces were almost in complete control of the eastern side, though a few parts of the city in the north had yet to be captured by the Iraqi Army. All five bridges of the city were also under the control of Iraqi forces. During the day, CTS captured the ruins of Nineveh, as well as the adjacent Tal Nirgal area. Meanwhile, the Iraqi Army captured the al-Qadhiyah district and were fighting on the edges of al-Arabi district. Around the same time, the PMU captured two areas in the Nineveh Plains region. On 19 January, the Iraqi Army captured the town of Tel Kayf, to the north of Mosul (after a nearly three-month-long siege), as well as the Nineveh Oberoi hotel and the "Palaces" area on the eastern bank of the Tigris. Clashes continued in the Al-Arabi District. The Iraqi Air Force carried out an airstrike in al-Zerai area in Mosul, reportedly killing five ISIL leaders including Abdel Wahed Khodier, assistant to Abu Bakr al-Baghdadi; the Islamic Police Chief in Nineveh, Ahmed Khodier Sayer al-Juwan and Agriculture Minister in Tal Afar and Mahlabiya, Abdel Karim Khodier Sayer al-Juwan. Iraqi forces also captured the Fadiliyah district and the Jaber ibn Hayyan military facility, as well as the Ghabat area. On 20 January, the 9th Division captured the free zone in the northern sector of Mosul. Iraqi forces also captured a pharmaceutical plant to the north of Mosul, as well as the Al-Arabi 1 district, while clashing with ISIL in the Rashidiyah district. Meanwhile, the CTS started performing clearing operations in the districts they had captured in east Mosul.

The battle situation on 25 January 2017 (full liberation of eastern Mosul)

On 21 January, Iraqi forces continued advancing in the outskirts of the city. The Iraqi Army captured the al-Arabi district, as well as al-Qousiyat village, killing 40 militants and destroying four car bombs. The CJTF–OIR Coalition also announced that between 19 and 21 January, they had targeted a flotilla of 90 boats and three barges being used by ISIL to cross the Tigris and escape the clashes. On the same day, Coalition officials stated that the fight for West Mosul was expected to be tougher than the fight for East Mosul. On 22 January, the Iraqi Army captured the Al-Milayeen district and Al-Binaa al-Jahiz area, as well as the Mosul-Dohuk road. By this point, only the Rashidiyah district was left under ISIL control in eastern Mosul. On 23 January, the Iraqi Army entered the Rashidiyah district. On 24 January, Iraqi troops captured the Rashidiyah district, as well as the villages of Ba'wiza, Shrikhan and Baysan. Following these advances, Iraqi Prime Minister Haider al-Abadi later announced the "full liberation" of eastern Mosul.

=== Interlude ===
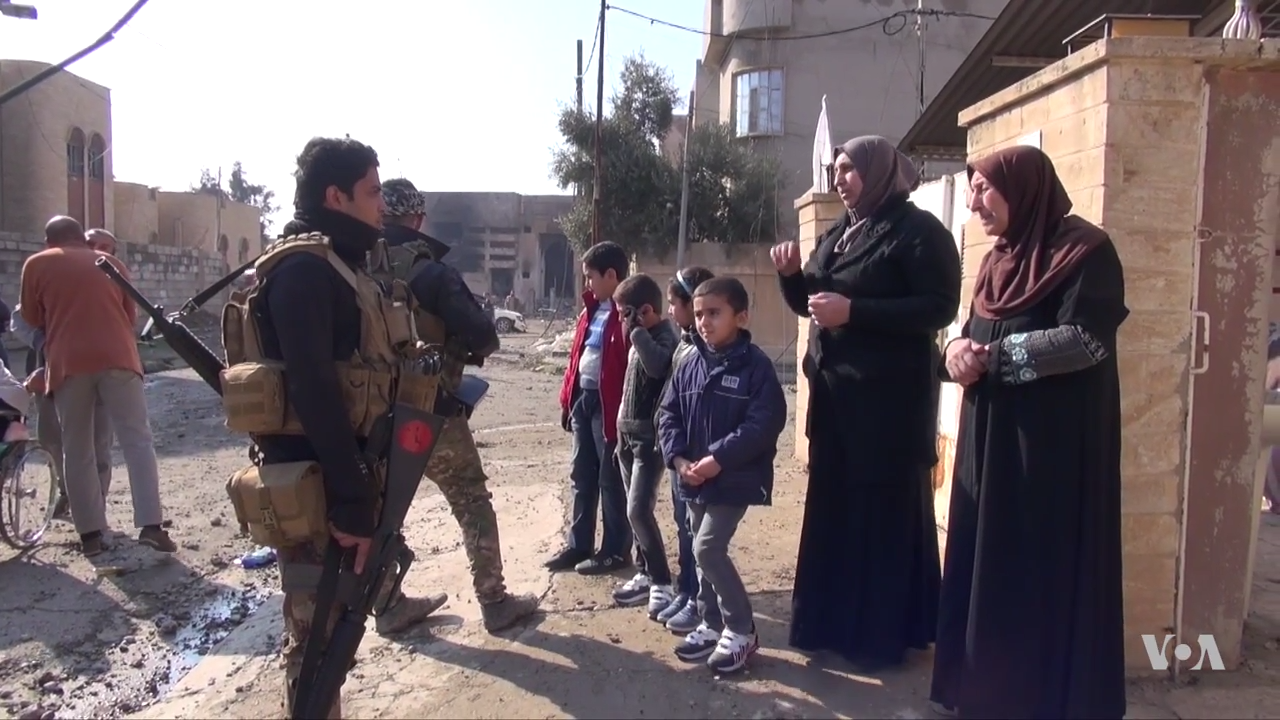
Iraqi soldiers converse with civilians in eastern Mosul, January 2017.

On 25 January, the PMU announced that they took over Tel Shana, a strategic hill in Salaheddin Province, after killing dozens of ISIL militants. It added that PMUs also took over the villages of Arab Leith, Mohamed al-Awad and Ard Mosaltan after intense fights with the extremist group. On 28 January, the PMU's 2nd Brigade repelled an attack launched by ISIL on the al-Kobayrat area, to the west of Mosul, killing 40 militants.

On 3 February, the PMU captured the villages of Bostan Radif and Um Gharba, as well as the Sherka region of western Mosul. On 13 February, more than 200 ISIL fighters launched an attack on three villages to the west of Tal Afar, with tanks and VBIEDs, to regain access between western Mosul and Raqqa. The attack was repelled by the PMU, resulting in deaths of more than 50 ISIL fighters and the destruction of 17 VBIEDs. Another attack on a village to the south of the area was repelled, resulting in deaths of 13 militants according to the Federal Police. Airstrikes by the anti-ISIL coalition killed Haqi Ismail Hamid al-Emri, a former member of al-Qaeda in Iraq who played a leadership role of ISIL's security networks in Mosul.

Map of the situation in Mosul on 1 March 2017. The ISF had just split ISIL's Mosul pocket, encircling the ISIL forces in the city. The pocket fell in late July. Iraqi government control ISIL control Peshmerga control

== Aftermath ==
=== Post-victory clashes ===
July

On 22 July, Iraqi security forces arrested ISIL's minister of agriculture, Falah Rashid, in western Mosul. Four police personnel, including a lieutenant general, were killed at al-Maash market after clashing with ISIL militants on 25 July. An ISIL senior leader who held the post of "tribal affairs bureau for southern Mosul" was arrested in eastern Mosul while crossing the Tigris River carrying a fake ID.

Meanwhile, many news outlets reported the end of the battle during the mid-to-late-July period, with the focus of Iraqi forces now being hunting down surviving militants, clearing explosives and dead bodies.

Nineveh police captain Saeed Najm said on 30 July that three ISIL leaders were killed while escaping western Mosul to the east via Tigris.

August

The Sudan Tribune reported on 5 August that Ali Abdel-Ma'arouf (aka Abu al-Asbat Al-Sudani), a Sudanese national, who was ISIL head of prisons and a top legislator, was killed during recent clearing operations in Mosul. On 8 August, a security source said that ISF in coordination with the Nineveh police, had arrested Ahmed Sabhan Abdel Wahid al-Dulaimi, a senior ISIL intelligence official, in east Mosul. Federal Police forces killed a senior ISIL judge, Abdul-Sattar Mohamed Ali, aka Abi al-Hakam al-Aawar, in a raid at a basement in the Old City. On 10 August, a source revealed that two civilians were killed and three others wounded when ISIL gunmen opened fire on them. Meanwhile, Federal Police chief, Shaker Jawdat, said in a statement that 47 ISIL members had been killed and arrested since the beginning of July. He also added that 192 explosive belts, ten tons of ammonia nitrates and five barrels of C4 and six booby-trapping workshops were seized.

Jawdat stated on 11 August that a workshop for manufacturing Katyusha rockets was found in Mesherfa district. Nineveh police intelligence department's Cap. Ahmed al-Obeidi told BasNews that they confiscated the biggest workshop used by ISIL to manufacture explosive belts and rockets in western Mosul.

Security forces arrested an unnamed ISIL military commander for eastern Mosul area, along with ten others in Mosul on 14 August.

Federal Police chief, Lt. Gen. Shaker Jawdat, said in a statement that an ISIL chemical reservoir was found in Mekkawi street in the Old City. It contained C4, ammonia and other substances.

October

Lieutenant-Colonel Abdul Salam al-Jabouri said on 12 October that some ISIL terrorists who had survived the military offensive in Mosul were detected in the marshlands area alongside near the Tigris, after they sent threats to some Tribal Mobilization leaders via SMS.

January 2018

Abu Omer, an ISIL leader who was notorious for appearing in ISIL's execution videos, was reported to have been captured in January 2018. Hisham al-Hashimi, adviser to the Iraqi government and other Middle Eastern government on ISIL matters, confirmed his identity.

=== Subsequent offensives ===
During the last stages of battle to retake Mosul, Lise Grande stated that per an initial assessment, basic infrastructure repair will cost over US$1 billion. She stated that while stabilization in east Mosul can be achieved in two months, in some districts of Mosul it might take years, with six out of 44 districts almost completely destroyed. All the districts of Mosul received light or moderate damage. Per the United Nations, 15 districts out of the 54 residential districts in the western half of Mosul were heavily damaged while at least 23 were moderately damaged in the battle. The UN also estimated that more than 5,000 buildings have been damaged and another 490 were destroyed in the Old City alone during the battle. Amnesty International accused Iraqi and United States forces of using unnecessarily powerful weapons. Sporadic clashes occurred after the victory declaration as Iraqi troops targeted holdouts. Fighting continued in the Imam Gharbi village to the south of Mosul and it was recaptured by Iraqi forces on 20 July. According to the American Schools of Oriental Research, IS damaged 15 religious sites in Mosul, while Coalition forces damaged 47, of which 38 were largely destroyed.

The Iraqi forces launched a ground offensive to retake Tal Afar, one of the last cities held by the militants, located 55 kilometres (34 mi) west of Mosul, on 20 August 2017. The city was captured on 28 August, with Iraqi forces capturing the rest of the district by 2 September.

Following the end of the Tal Afar offensive, the Iraqi Army launched another offensive to retake the ISIL-controlled Hawija Pocket on 20 September 2017.

== Humanitarian issues and human rights abuses ==
Up to 1.5 million civilians lived in the city, sparking concerns among various organizations of a large humanitarian crisis. Lise Grande, the United Nations' humanitarian coordinator in Iraq, stated, "In a worst-case scenario, we're literally looking at the single largest humanitarian operation in the world in 2016." Save the Children warned that massive civilian bloodshed was likely, unless safe routes were authorized to let civilians flee. The U.S. government has accused ISIL of using civilians as human shields.

=== ISIL abuses, abductions and atrocities ===
Fears that civilians could be used as human shields by ISIL were realized as it was confirmed the group had been abducting civilians from villages for this purpose, which received widespread condemnation from human rights groups and the United Nations Security Council.

Shortly after the battle began, news surfaced of ISIL kidnapping and executing civilians in Mosul. Pentagon spokesman Capt. Jeff Davis stated that ISIL was using civilians as human shields and holding people against their will in the city.

The International Business Times reported that ISIL has forced boys from Mosul as young as 12 to fight for them, and that ISIL had trained the children to "behead prisoners and make suicide bombs."

An Iraqi intelligence source stated on 21 October that ISIL executed 284 men and boys abducted from Mosul for the purpose of using them as human shields. The civilians were shot and put in a mass grave. A United Nations official said the UN is "gravely worried" about the fate of 200 families from Somalia and 350 families from Najafia who were abducted Monday by ISIL, who could be used as human shields.

On 26 October, CNN reported that ISIL has been carrying out "retribution killings" of civilians as revenge for others welcoming Iraqi and Peshmerga troops in villages restored under government control.

=== Allegations against anti-ISIL forces ===
The presence with Iraqi forces of several militias with histories of human rights abuses was criticized; Human Rights Watch called for Shia militias from the Popular Mobilization Forces (PMF) not to enter Mosul, following allegations of abuse of Sunni Muslims in anti-ISIL operations in Fallujah, Tikrit and Amirli. Iraqi Prime Minister Haider al-Abadi later stated that only the Iraqi army and the Iraqi national police would enter the city itself.

On 21 October, International Business Times reported that "disturbing and graphic footage posted to social media allegedly shows Iraqi security forces torturing and interrogating young children for information about ISIL as they attempt to retake Mosul from the Islamic State terror group."

On 17 March, a U.S.-led coalition airstrike in Mosul killed more than 200 civilians. Amnesty International's senior investigator on crisis response said: "The high civilian toll suggests that coalition forces leading the offensive in Mosul have failed to take adequate precautions to prevent civilian deaths, in flagrant violation of international humanitarian law."

An estimate in mid-July 2017 by Kurdish intelligence put the total number of civilian casualties at 40,000. The largest portion of this loss of life is attributable to the unyielding artillery bombardment by Iraqi government forces—in particular, units of the Iraqi Federal Police—of west Mosul. Killings by ISIL and air strikes were two other significant sources of civilian deaths.

=== Use of chemical weapons ===
The World Health Organization stated on 4 March 2017 that twelve people were being treated in Erbil for possible exposure to chemical weapons in Mosul. The WHO said that they had enabled "an emergency response plan to safely treat men, women and children who may be exposed to the highly toxic chemical[s]" and were preparing for more patients with exposure to these agents. According to the UN, four patients show "severe signs associated with exposure to a blister agent", which they were exposed to on the eastern side of the city.

In April 2017, American and Australian advisory forces embedded with Iraqi units were attacked with low-grade, "rudimentary" chemical weapons during an offensive.

=== Displacements and relief efforts ===
Italian Filippo Grandi, the UN High Commissioner for Refugees, arrived in Erbil on 17 October to meet with Kurdish officials. The UN has set up five refugee camps capable of taking up to 45,000 people and has the capability of taking in up to 120,000 if more sites are available for camps. Dozens of families from Mosul arrived in the Al-Hawl camp in Rojava, northern Syria, bringing the number of Iraqis in al-Hawl to more than 6,000. On 18 October, more than 2,000 refugees from Mosul were attempting to cross into Syria, according to the People's Defense Units (YPG). The UN is attempting to communicate with citizens inside Mosul that they should not flee to the West of the city toward Syria, an area still under ISIL control, but to the camps in the east.

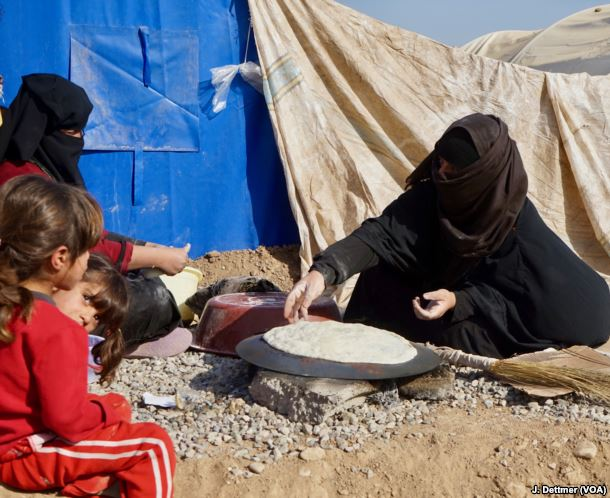
A displaced Sunni Arab family from Mosul

The World Health Organization (WHO) said it had trained 90 Iraqi medics in "mass casualty management" as part of its preparations for the Mosul operation, with a special focus on responding to chemical attacks, AP reported. ISIL has previously used chemical weapons in attacks on Iraqi and coalition forces, and there are fears that it might do so again inside Mosul, where more than a million civilians live.

On 3 November, Kurdish and UN aid workers said that more than 40,000 refugees had fled to Kurdistan in the first few weeks of fighting. Ten new refugee camps have been built in the Dohuk Governorate, Erbil Governorate and in the town of Khazir. According to the United Nations and UNICEF, 22,000 people had been displaced, including more than 9,000 children.

On 6 November, the United Nations High Commissioner for Refugees (UNHCR) stated that 33,996 people had been displaced from the Mosul District. Sixty-three percent of families are missing civil documentation and 21 percent of families are headed by a female. The previous 48 hours saw a 53 percent increase in displacement. The following day, WHO announced it had established 82 "rapid response teams" to prepare for possible concerns among civilians fleeing Mosul, including health epidemics such as cholera, and exposure to chemicals and smoke from burning oil wells. A particular concern is potential disease outbreaks among young children who have not been immunized since ISIL took over the city in June 2014.

More than 900 Iraqi civilians have fled to the Al-Hawl refugee camp located in the Rojava region of northeastern Syria, while another 700 civilians have migrated to the Turkish–Iraqi borders.

In March 2017, the WHO contracted Australian health services company Aspen Medical to manage a 48-bed field hospital south of Mosul. Aspen Medical initially provided a team of over 80 clinical, project management, logistics and support personnel. By June, the company was managing an additional hospital.

== Context ==
=== International reactions ===
France

- Jean-Marc Ayrault, France's Minister of Foreign Affairs, said on 27 October, "We know that we will face significant challenges and it is our responsibility to face them together, alongside Iraq, while fully respecting its independence and sovereignty."
- President Emmanuel Macron congratulated Iraqi forces and tweeted on 9 July 2017: "Mosul liberated from Daesh. Homage from France to all those, with our troops, who contributed to this victory."

Lebanon

- Lebanese Foreign Ministry on 10 July 2017 called for intensified regional efforts to contain the spread of terrorism "from one nest to another" and hailed the recapture of the city as a "great victory" for the Iraqi people.

Russia

- President Vladimir Putin on 17 October said: "We hope that our American partners, and in this case our French partners as well, will act selectively and do everything to minimise—and even better, to rule out—civilian casualties."

Turkey

- Turkish President Recep Tayyip Erdoğan insisted unsuccessfully on a Turkish role in the Battle for Mosul (see Turkish involvement below).
- On 26 October, Turkish FM Mevlüt Çavuşoğlu said "Fighting ISIL is necessary, but the process after ISIL must be planned carefully."
- Exiled former Iraqi vice-president Tariq al-Hashimi condemned the cooperation between the United States and Iran during the course of the conflict, he also condemned the Shia dominated Popular Mobilization Force for taking part in the battle of Mosul and urged the international community to intervene to not allow them to take part in the operation.

United States

- President Barack Obama said on 18 October, "Mosul will be a difficult fight and there will be advances and setbacks. I am confident, just as ISIL has been defeated in communities across Iraq, ISIL will be defeated in Mosul as well, and that will be another step toward their ultimate destruction."
- Secretary of Defense Ashton Carter said on 16 October, in a statement, "This is a decisive moment in the campaign to deliver ISIL a lasting defeat."

=== Other ===
Iraqi Baath Party

- Secretary General of the Iraqi Baath Party and former vice-chairman of the Iraqi Revolutionary Command Council and former leader of the Army of the Men of the Naqshbandi Order, Izzat Ibrahim al-Douri released a statement in early 2018 commemorating the anniversary of the Baath Party's foundation, in the statement he condemned the Iraqi Government and the military action taken in Iraq against ISIL calling on "Baathist Youth" to continue to rebel against the Iraqi Government, he also referred to Iranian forces and allied paramilitary groups as Safavids. Douri also stated he had great hope in Saudi Arabia to help Iraq against Iran's influence, in the statement Douri said that Iraqi Prime Minister Haider al-Abadi personally destroyed Tikrit, Mosul, Fallujah and other Sunni majority cities in northern Iraq as part of their war against ISIL and that the Badr Organization was directly under Iranian control. He also threatened to go to war with the Iraqi government and allied Shiite militias.

=== Media coverage and social media ===
Several media outlets including Al Jazeera and Channel 4 live streamed the first day's battle on Facebook, a first in war coverage. Additional live video feeds were available on YouTube and the streaming app Periscope. Iraqi and Kurdish officials are also joining in on social media using the hashtag #FreeMosul. Brendan Gauthier, assistant editor of Salon, noted that given ISIL's slick campaigns on social media, "It's only appropriate then that the Iraqi military's effort to reclaim Mosul from the PR machine turned extremist group be live-streamed."

On 17 October, several Iraqi media outlets established the National Media Alliance to support journalists reporting on the battle. The groups include both government-run and private media, including Al Iraqiya and Al Sumaria. The alliance provides technical and journalistic services, including a joint operations newsroom. It was formed to counter ISIL propaganda and foster cooperation among the various media groups in order to reduce chaos and improve safety. Journalist Walid al-Tai told Al-Monitor, "One of the reasons behind the establishment of the alliance is to avoid any chaotic media coverage of the battle as every media and military institution is sending its correspondents to battlefronts. This leads to conflict in the coverage of the fighting and a greater number of casualties among journalists."

Journalist Mustafa Habib reported that Iraqi citizens are coordinating efforts on Facebook and Twitter to counter ISIL propaganda, such as fake photos and videos, that may be used to intimidate locals in Mosul. A communications department of a Shia militia also announced it would be contributing to a social media campaign, and that 500 Iraqi journalists were embedded with the militias surrounding Mosul to report updates.

On 27 October 2016, The New Yorker's Robin Wright interviewed the anonymous self-described historian Mosul Eye, a purported Mosuli who has blogged from the city about life in Mosul under ISIL despite death threats from the group. Responding to Wright's questions, Mosul Eye estimated the size and make-up of ISIL's force in Mosul, hopes for the future ("gain back power over the city" with help of "an international trusteeship to protect Mosul"), and the level of support for ISIL inside Mosul ("There is no support for ISIL in Mosul. They are left only with weapons that they will use to kill themselves once the liberating forces make the decision to raid the city.").

=== Turkish involvement ===
The involvement of Turkey in the operation has considerably strained its relations with Iraq. Turkey has 1,500 to 2,000 soldiers in Iraq, including 500 Turkish soldiers deployed to a base near Bashiqa, where they trained 1,500 Iraqi Sunni volunteers, mainly Turkmens, and Arabs to recapture Mosul from ISIL. Turkey's participation is against the wishes of the Iraqi government, which has said the Turks are violating Iraq's sovereignty. Turkey has refused to withdraw its forces. Turkish President Recep Tayyip Erdoğan told the Turkish parliament on 1 October, "We will play a role in the Mosul liberation operation and no one can prevent us from participating," and said their presence was to ensure that Mosul did not fall to Kurdish or Shia control and become a threat to Turkey. Turkey's presence was criticized by Kurds in northern Iraq, and thousands of protestors demonstrated at the Turkish Embassy in Baghdad on 18 October, demanding Turkish forces withdraw from Iraq. The United States has reportedly attempted to persuade Iraq to cooperate with Turkey on the Mosul offensive. Al-Abadi declined the offer of Turkish assistance, saying, "I know that the Turks want to participate. We tell them thank you, this is something the Iraqis will handle and the Iraqis will liberate Mosul and the rest of the territories." However, on 23 October, Turkish Prime Minister Binali Yıldırım announced Turkish troops had fired on ISIL positions near Mosul after requests for assistance from the Peshmerga.

The situation between Turkey and Iraq escalated on 1 November, the day Iraqi forces entered Mosul. Turkey announced it was sending tanks and artillery from Ankara to Silopi near the Iraqi border. Turkey's Minister of Defense Fikri Işık said the deployment was a move to "prepare for "important developments" in the region and be ready for any possible scenario" and stated that "further action can be taken if Turkey's red lines are crossed" warning Shi'ite militias and PKK not to "terrorize" and take hold of Iraqi Turkmen-majority regions in the area. Prime Minister Al-Abadi warned Turkey not to "invade" Iraq, predicting war if they did. Al-Abadi, addressing journalists in Baghdad, said, "We warn Turkey if they want to enter Iraq, they will end up becoming fragmented... We do not want to fight Turkey. We do not want a confrontation with Turkey. God forbid, even if we engage in war with them, the Turks will pay a heavy price. They will be damaged. Yes, we too will be damaged, but whenever a country fights a neighboring country, there will be no winner, both will end up losing."

On 7 November, Iraq rejected Turkey's proposal to continue running the Bashiqa military camp, no matter if it were formally transferred under the auspices of the coalition forces, and suggested that Turkey hand over control of the camp to Iraq's central government.

== Violation of the laws of war ==
In February 2017, Human Rights Watch issued a report regarding the violation of the laws of war in Iraq. According to the report, Islamic State fighters occupied Al-Salam Hospital in Mosul in June 2014, and put the staff and the patients at risk of attacks. During the Battle of Mosul, seven Iraqi soldiers' corpses were dragged through the streets, and the bodies of three soldiers were hanged from a bridge in the city. As the report mentioned, ISIL fighters occupied a clinic in the town of Hammam al-Alil, which was then hit by an airstrike without warning on 18 October, killing at least eight civilians. Previously, they occupied other clinics in other towns controlled by the Islamic State fighters in Iraq, as well operating offices in all the medical facilities in the Republican, Ibn Sina, al-Salam, and Mosul General Hospitals.

Human Rights Watch has also accused the Iraqi security forces and Popular Mobilization Forces (PMF) of dragging the bodies of alleged ISIL fighters in the town of Qayyarah and in the city of Fallujah, after Iraqi forces took eastern Mosul on 24 January 2017. They warned that allowing PMF to conduct the screenings of men and boys fleeing Mosul for having fought for ISIL would have "dire human rights consequences."

Human Rights Watch warned that PMF were poorly trained to conduct these screenings. They argued that the irregular nature of screening and detention practices and isolation of detainees in custody risk abuse of the detainees, including arbitrary detention and enforced disappearances. Despite assurances from the Iraqi government that the PMF would not screen detainees in Mosul, an observer reported that three PMF groups were seen at a screening site on 11 March 2017: Hezbollah Brigades, al-Abbas Brigades and Imam Ali Battalions.

On 11 July 2017, a report was published by Amnesty International, accusing both sides of violating international laws in the battle, about a day after victory was declared by Iraqi forces. The report accused Iraqi forces and the US-led Coalition of carrying out a series of unlawful attacks in west Mosul, relying heavily on Improvised Rocket-Assisted Munitions (IRAMs), explosive weapons and the failure of government to take necessary precautions to prevent the loss of civilian lives and in some cases including disproportionate attacks.

According to a report published by UN Assistance Mission for Iraq and the Office of the UN High Commissioner for Human Rights in November 2017, at least 2,521 civilians were killed in the battle, mostly because of ISIL including executions of at least 741. It also recorded 461 civilian deaths in airstrikes during the most intensive phase from 19 February. It noted that ISIL had announced in November 2016 that civilians under government-held areas would be considered "legitimate targets" as they didn't fight the pro-government forces. It also called upon Iraqi authorities to investigate alleged violations and human rights abuses by Iraqi security forces during the battle.

An Associated Press investigation that cross-referenced independent databases from non-governmental organizations, claimed that 9,000–11,000 residents of Mosul were killed in the battle. It blamed airstrikes and shellings by Iraqi forces and anti-ISIL coalition of being responsible for at least 3,200 civilian deaths. The coalition on the other hand has acknowledged responsibility for 326 deaths. ISIL was held responsible for killing one third of the civilians out of the death toll. AP also obtained a list of 9,606 people killed in the battle from Mosul's morgue while Iraqi Prime Minister Haider al-Abadi had claimed 1,260 deaths. Four thousand two hundred were confirmed to be civilians. Names of ISIL fighters and casualties from outside Mosul were discarded by the investigation. It stated, however, that some ISIL members might be among the remaining 6,000.

== See also ==
- 2017 Mayadin offensive
- Battle of al-Bab
- Battle of Aleppo (2012–2016)
- Battle of Baghuz Fawqani
- Battle of Ramadi (2015–2016)
- Central Syria campaign
- Nineveh Plains offensive
- Palmyra offensive (December 2016)
- Siege of Deir ez-Zor (2014–2017)
- Siege of Kobanî
- Siege of Marawi
- Tell Abyad offensive
