= Qayyarah Airfield West =

Air establishment in Mosul, Republic of Iraq

- Qayyarah, Ninawa

Site information
- Owner: Iraqi Armed Forces
- Operator: Iraqi Air Force; Iraqi Army (July 9, 2016–present); United States Army (May 3, 2003–2011) (2016–March 26, 2020); United States Air Force (2016–March 26, 2020)

Location
- Location within Iraq
- Coordinates: 35°45′57″N 043°07′18″E

Site history
- Built: 1970
- In use: 1970s–present

Airfield information
- Identifiers: IATA: RQW, ICAO: ORQW
- Elevation: 749 feet (228 m) AMSL
Runways
Direction	Length and surface
15/33	3,500 metres (11,483 ft) Asphalt

The base gym was opened in May of 2004.

Qayyarah Airfield West (Arabic: قاعدة القيارة الجوية) is an Iraqi Air Force base in the Qayyarah subdistrict of Mosul District in northern Iraq. It was captured by U.S. Army during Operation Iraqi Freedom in 2003. It was also known as Q–West or Key West by the various U.S. Army Forces and civilian contractors stationed there. Control of the base was returned to Iraq in March 2020.

== History ==
=== Saddam Era ===
Formerly known as Saddam Airbase, the facility is located 16 kilometres (9.9 mi) west of the Tigris River, 20 kilometres (12 mi) west of Qayyarah town, 60 kilometres (37 mi) south of Mosul and about 300 kilometres (190 mi) north of Baghdad. Qayyarah West AB was built in the late 1970s and was one of several Iraqi Air Force airfields of the 1970s which were re-built under project "Super-Base" in response to experiences from the Arab-Israeli wars in 1967 and 1973. It became a major airfield during the 1980s war with Iran, when it was the main hub for Iraqi Dassault Mirage F1EQ operations, and when it was the first airbase of Mikoyan-Gurevich MiG-23MLs. Later during that war, Mikoyan-Gurevich MiG-25s also operated from there.

Reportedly, in 2002, the 9th Squadron, and the 79th and 89th Squadrons, respectively flying MiG-21s and Mirage F1s were operating from the base.

The secondary "Sector-Operations Center" (SOC) of the Northern Command IrAF was based here until March 2003. There were two Weapon Storage Areas (WSA) located 10 and 12 kilometers to the north that were probably associated with Qayyarah West. WSA 1 had 30 munition storage igloos and is 1640 acres in size. WSA 2 had 42 munition storage igloos and is 800 acres in size. It is not known whether these storage areas were built after the Gulf War or whether they were struck during the bombing of Iraq in 1998.

=== Initial United States military use ===
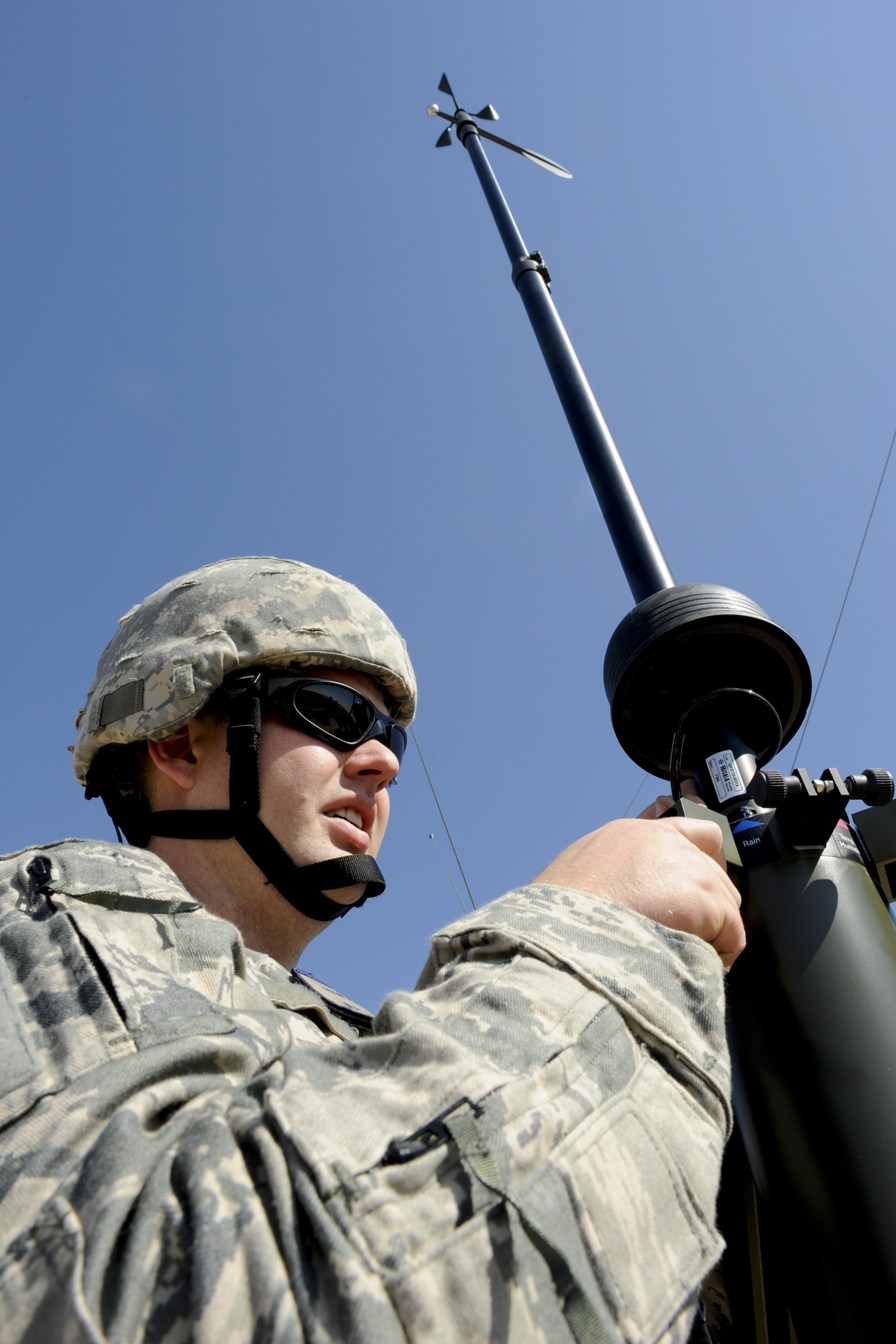
US military weather technician installs a weather observation system Qayyarah Airfield West, 2011

During Operation Iraqi Freedom in March 2003, the base was heavily attacked by Coalition airpower and seized by Coalition ground forces. When US troops arrived on May 23, the main runway and the control tower, set about two miles away from the headquarters compound, had suffered damage. More than thirty craters were the result of precision bombing by American planes during both Gulf Wars: about 13 craters were gouged out of the 2.2 miles (3.5 km) long main strip, and another 30 impact craters destroyed surrounding runways and lesser airstrips; some of the craters reached 30 feet in depth, and 120 feet in diameter.

By July 2003, Qayyarah West Airfield was the home of the 'Bastogne Bulldogs', 1st Brigade, 101st Airborne Division. One of the first priorities was repair of the runway and tower, and the airfield was then able to accept the largest US transports, such as Lockheed C-5 Galaxy. After 69 days of around-the-clock work, soldiers of the 37th Engineer Battalion, out of Fort Bragg, NC, repaired the craters that littered the main airstrip at Q-West and had prevented planes from landing there; as a result, a more secure route for needed items was established.

Qayyarah West was protected by a 20 kilometres (12 mi) security perimeter. Within the perimeter, vegetation growth highlights drew attention to the base. Vegetation planted to obscure the base from ground observation had the opposite effect when viewed from overhead.

During Operation Iraqi Freedom, only a handful of the 101 Airborne's 1st Brigade actually lived on base; most of the soldiers were spread around the region, where they were tasked with missions such as local outreach and assistance, search and cordon, safety patrols and guard duty for important archaeological sites to prevent looting. The outlying troops lived where they worked, some in tents, others in makeshift quarters in existing buildings.

==== FOB Endurance ====
FOB Endurance was located at Qayyarah Airfield West. It was another name for FOB Q-West.

The facility is surrounded by desert and no settlements are located near the base. In November 2004, the facility's internet access was slow relative to that available at Mosul Airbase and sometimes prone to not working. Phone access was reported to be limited. Mail deliveries were described as taking extra time because of the facility's remote location, but were running at about 3 per week, while outgoing mail was limited to one or two times per month.

A soldier-operated mini-PX opened on November 20, 2004, in room 116 of the bombed out palace. The mini-PX was to be supplied with stock from the main PX warehouse at Mosul Airbase. Other facilities at FOB Endurance included a dining facility, an MWR building with a theater. The base gym which, in November 2004, was operated by KBR, offered a basketball court, along with access to free weights, exercise bicycles and treadmills.

On December 17, 2004, the 917th Corps Support Group took over the duties of the 167th Corps Support Group at FOB Endurance. The 2nd Battalion, 8th Field Artillery Regiment and 163rd Ordnance Detachment F was also stationed at the facility starting around November 2004. The 116th Rear Area Operations Center moved to FOB Endurance after Thanksgiving 2004 from Mosul AB.

Tiger Squadron of the 3rd Cavalry Regiment was the major US combat unit on FOB Q-West during October 2007 - February 2009. The unit oversaw and supported combat operations conducted out of multiple subunit locations in the region. 506th was there in 2009. Handed the base base over during the switch from Iraqi to enduring freedom

=== ISIL occupation ===
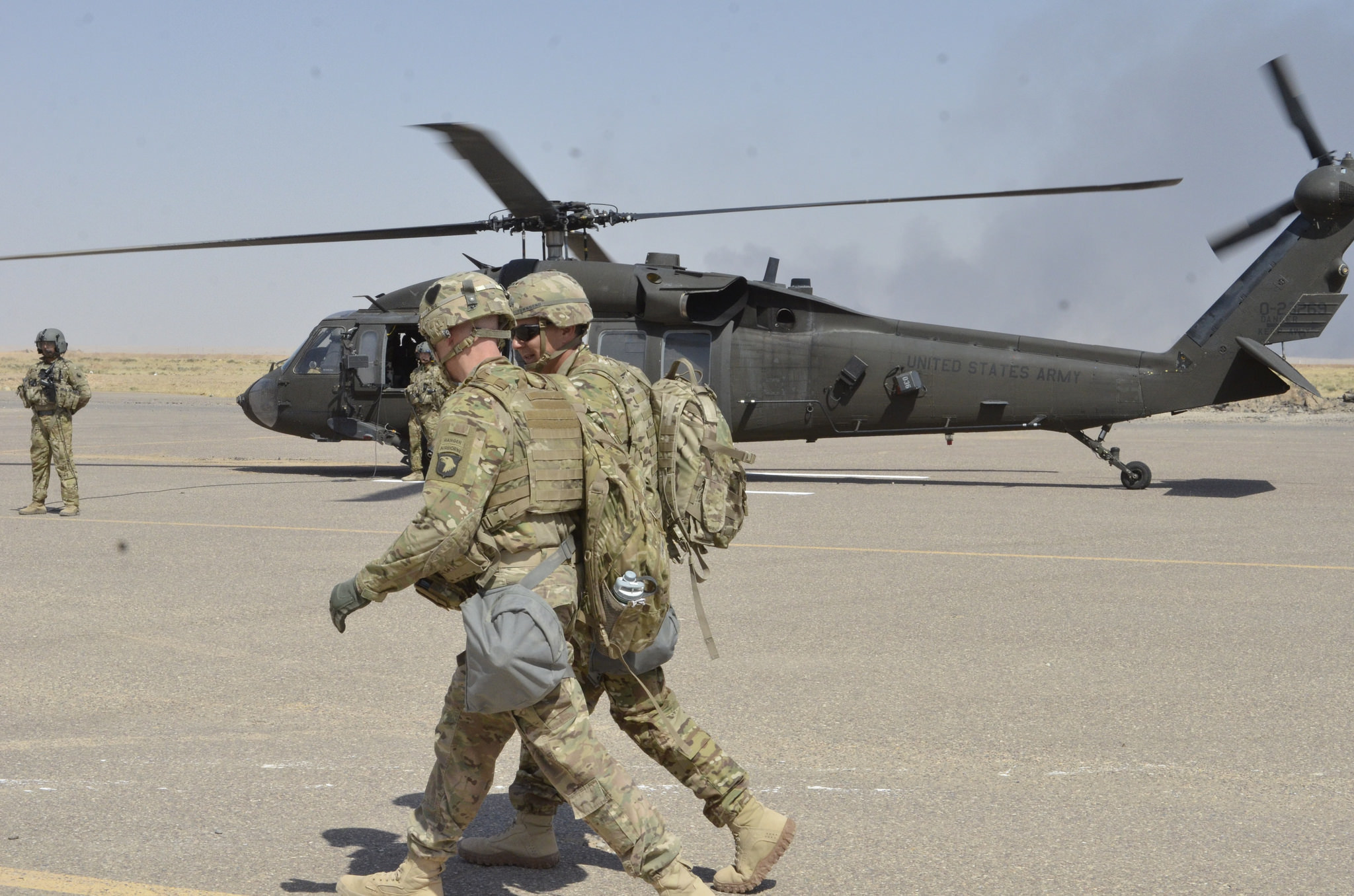
U.S. Lt. Gen. Stephen J. Townsend, commander of the Combined Joint Task Force, at Qayyarah Airfield West, 22 September 2016

Qayyarah Airfield West came under ISIL occupation in 2014 along with the Mosul area. During the occupation, the base had been the target of airstrikes by aircraft of the international coalition. In February 2015, there were reports that ISIL evacuated the base intermittently in the aftermath of coalition bombing attacks. "Dozens of dead and wounded" among the ISIL militants in the attacks were also reported.

== Post-ISIL period ==
On 9 July 2016, the Iraqi army recaptured Qayyarah Airfield West from ISIL during the Mosul offensive, reportedly "without any resistance". The airfield was considered a "strategic launch-pad" for the ongoing offensive. Photos showed obviously unusable Iraqi MiG-23/MiG-27 fighter/attack aircraft. Q-West then served as the international headquarters for the Battle of Mosul, beginning on 16 October 2016. About 560 U.S. troops from the 101st Airborne Division were deployed here for the battle. Deployments included command and control elements, a security detachment, an airfield operations team, and logistics and communications specialists. Also a life support area for the Iraqi forces was set up by the U.S. troops.

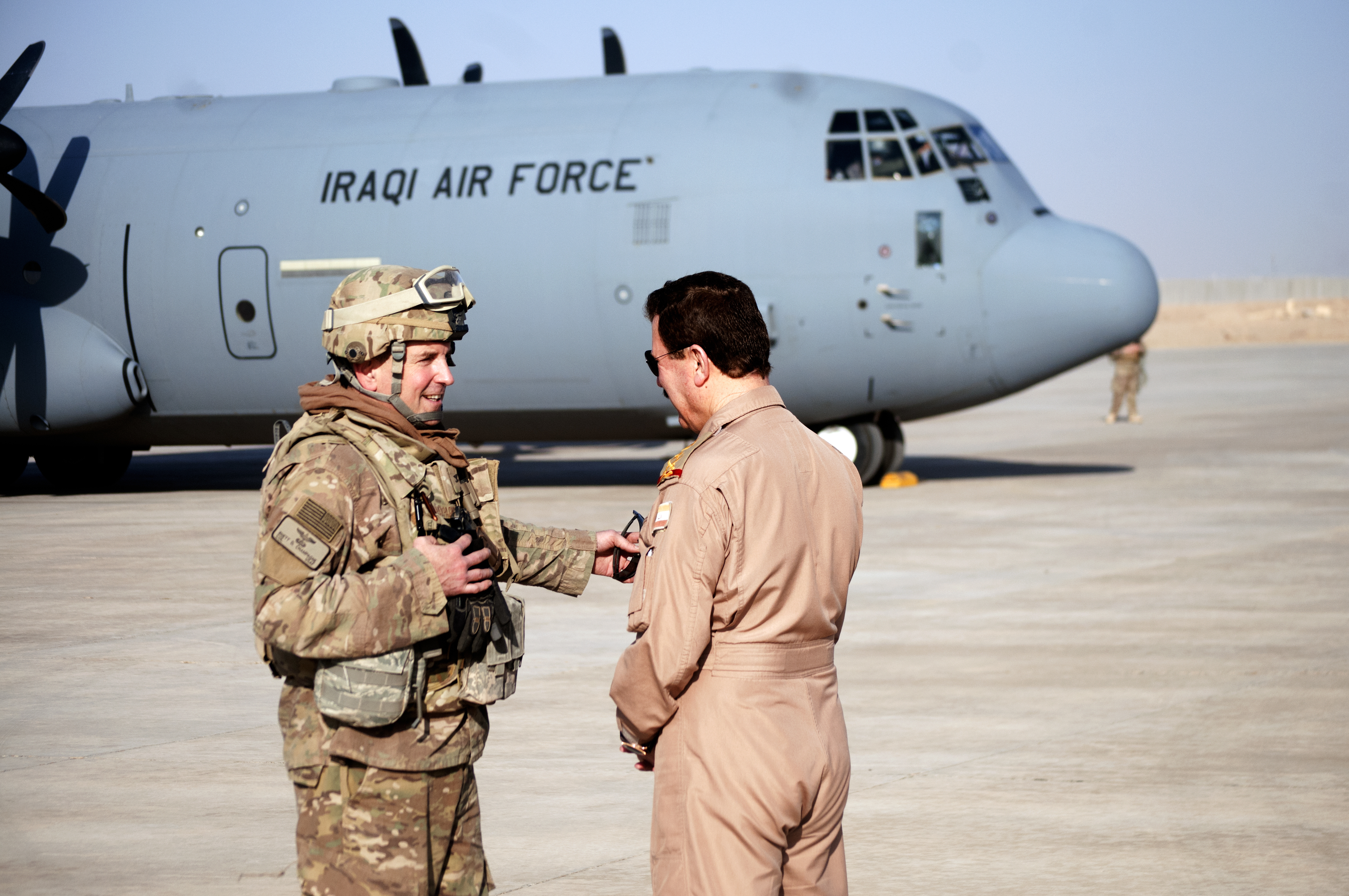
U.S. Air Force Col. Rhett Champagne speaks with the chief of staff of the Iraqi air force at Q-West Airfield on 30 October 2016.

On 22 October, the repaired airfield and its runway were reopened, with the first of many fixed-wing cargo airplanes arriving at the airfield. On 30 October, an Iraqi Air Force C-130J Super Hercules landed at Qayyarah West Airfield, the first time a fixed-wing aircraft from the Iraqi security forces landed there since the airfield was recaptured from ISIL.

The United States Army left the site on May 13, 2020.

=== Units ===
- Company A, 39th Brigade Engineer Battalion, Task Force Strike.
- Company G, 526th Brigade Support Battalion, Task Force Strike.
- Company B, 1st Battalion, 26th Infantry Regiment, Task Force Strike.
- Headquarters and Headquarters Company, 39th Brigade Engineer Battalion, Task Force Strike.
- Expeditionary Medical Unit 10-Golf, USN

B Battery 3-321st Field Artillery Regiment(HIMARS)

- C Troop, 5th Squadron 1st Cavalry Regiment, 1-25 SBCT

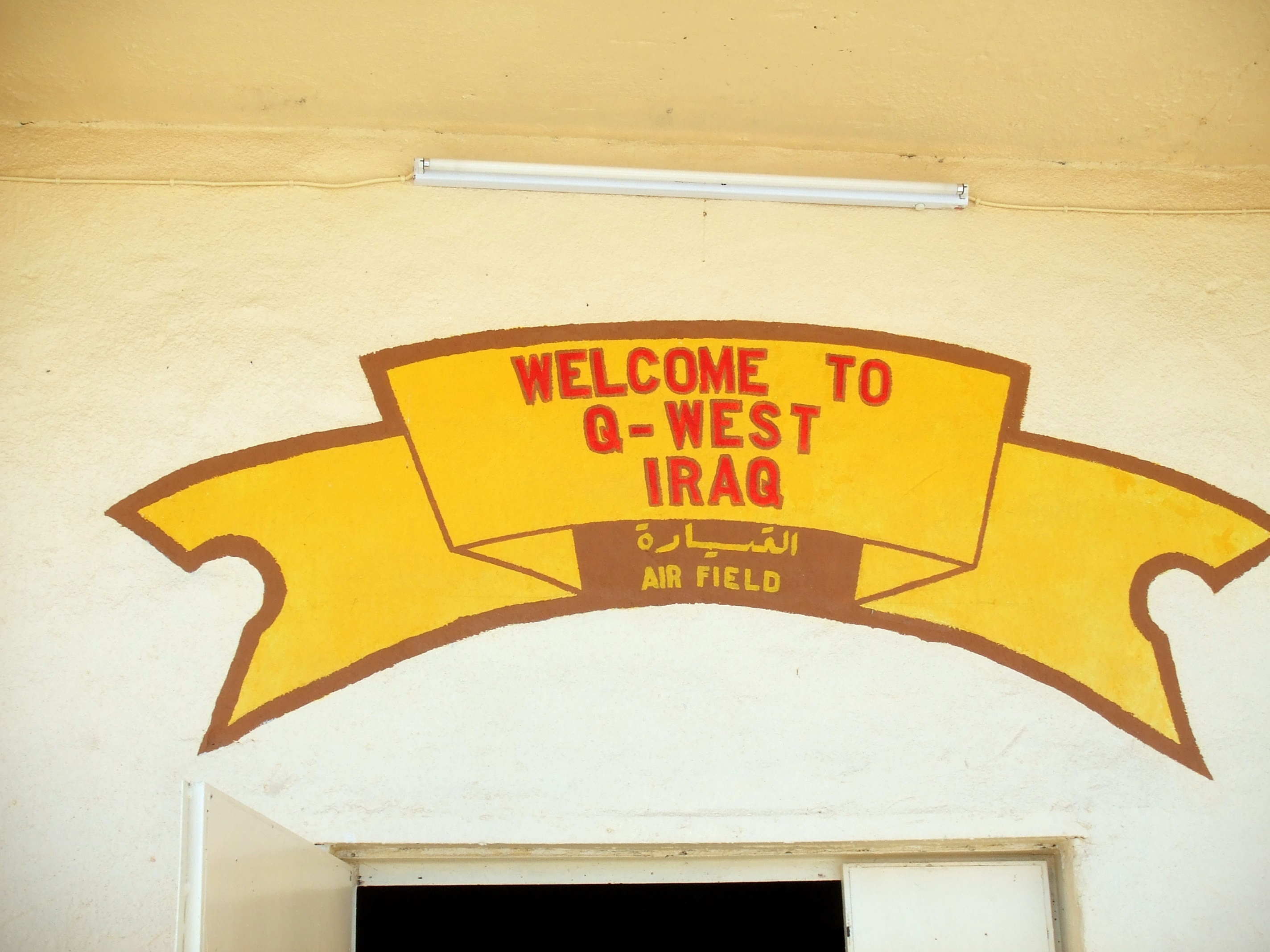
Q-West Air Terminal 2008

A-co, 1-24 infantry regiment, 1-25 SBCT

- 31st Air Defense Artillery Brigade, Charlie Battery, 5-5 ADA, C-RAM
