= Hamam al-Alil =

Hamam al-Alil حمام العليل
- Location within Iraq
- Coordinates: 36°09′29.2″N 43°15′33.8″E
- Country: Iraq
- Governorate: Nineveh
- Municipality: Mosul District

Population (2016)
  - Total: 25,000

Hamam al-Alil (also: Hammam al-Alil; Arabic: حمام العليل "fresh bath") is a spa town about 27 km south of Mosul in the Nineveh Governorate in Iraq, on the western bank of the Tigris River. It is well known for its mineral water springs and receives visitors from all over Iraq seeking treatment due to the various purported medical benefits of the sulfur-rich geothermal waters.

In 2019, the authorities undertook renovation works to the Hamam al-Alil baths costing $500,000 that were completed in June 2022.

== Recent history ==
In 2014, Hamam al-Alil was seized by ISIL, along with neighbouring Mosul. On 11 February 2014, 15 Iraqi soldiers were killed in a pre-dawn assault on an army camp guarding an oil pipeline near Hamam al-Alil. In July 2016, F16 fighters of the international coalition against ISIL destroyed ISIL's bases in the area. During the 2016 Battle of Mosul the town was attacked by the Iraqi Army in the final days of October 2016 and reportedly "90 percent surrounded". It was also reported that ISIL executed 42 civilians in the town.

A combination of Iraqi, federal police and elite interior ministry forces liberated Hamam al-Alil from ISIL on 7 November 2016.

== See also ==
- Battle of Mosul (2016–17)
