= Mosul District =

Mosul District Arabic: الموصل
- District
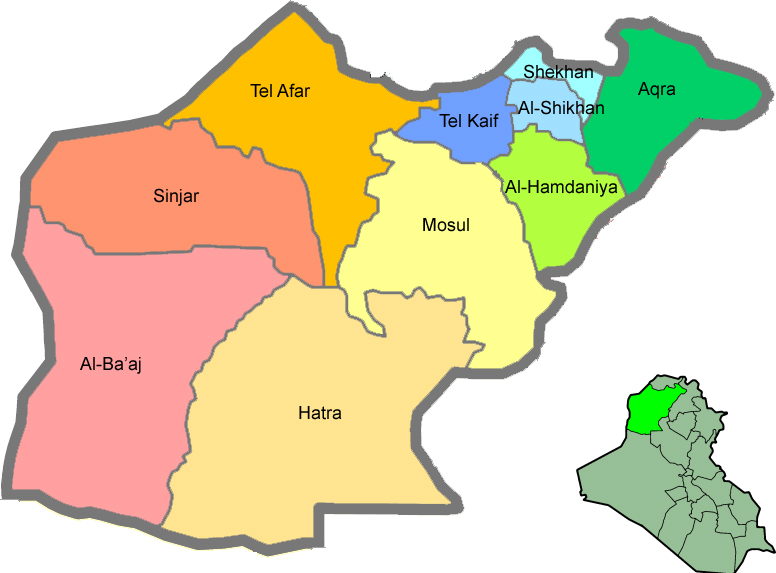
- Mosul District (tan) in Nineveh Governorate
- Interactive map of Mosul District
- Country: Iraq
- Governorate: Nineveh Governorate

Area
  - Total: 4,471 km^{2} (1,726 sq mi)

Population (2003)
  - Total: 1,432,230
- Time zone: UTC+3 (AST)

Mosul District (Arabic: قضاء الموصل) is a district in Nineveh Governorate, Iraq. Its administrative center is the city of Mosul. Other settlements include Al-Qayyarah, Al-Shurah, Hamam al-Alil, Al-Mahlaah, and Hamidat. The district is predominantly Sunni Arab, with minorities of Assyrians, Turkmen and Kurds located in the city of Mosul.
