= Timeline of the Battle of Mosul (2016–17): Phase Three =

Part of the War in Iraq

Coordinates: 35.8003°N 43.2897°E

The following is a timeline of Phase Three of the Battle of Mosul (2016–17) between February and July 2017.

== February: Attack on west Mosul ==
18 February

On 18 February, leaflets were distributed to western Mosul residents announcing and assuring that the offensive against the ISIL-held region of the city would continue soon. Iraqi fighter jets also targeted ISIL's headquarters and communication positions in the western area.

19 February

On 19 February, Iraqi Prime Minister Haider al-Abadi, announced the start of the operation to capture western Mosul. Iraqi forces attacked to retake the Mosul Airport, capturing around 15 villages and a power plant near west Mosul during the day.

20 February

On 20 February, Iraqi forces captured the strategic village of Albu Saif to the south of Mosul and reached the vicinity of the city's airport. PMU meanwhile recaptured Sahaji, the last ISIL-held village on the road between Tal Afar and Mosul, effectively cutting off the road between the two cities. It also captured the village of Lazaga during the day. Iraqi Kurdistan's Counter-terrorism Group (CTG) meanwhile stated that Peshmerga forces had killed several ISIL leaders and at least 30 militants in an operation carried out with the co-operation of the anti-ISIL coalition. The leaders killed in the operation included Abu Bakr el Sheshani, who is a Russian national and ISIL's military official in Nineveh Governorate, Abu Fatma el Tounsi who is the group's financial official in the governorate, Dr. Salah Hassan el Sakalawi (also known as Dr. Abdullah) who is considered ISIL's health minister, as well as Dr. Abu Hassan el Homosi who is the group's Emir for health in Wilayat el Sham. Iraqi forces also attacked Ghazlani camp, the biggest military facility in Mosul. Federal Police also was reported to have captured about 8 villages western outskirts of Mosul.

21 February

On 21 February, Iraqi forces continued clearing the hills around Albu Saif, successfully clearing two villages near it. Raed Shakir Jawdat, Federal Police chief later stated that ISIL had pulled out of Mosul airport after clashes. At least 90 ISIS militants were announced to have been killed in drone strikes during the day, ISIL's chief security observant "Abu Abdullah" and Mekhled al-Geheishi, a senior ISIL executioner at Badush prison, were among them.

22 February

Contrary to previous days reports, the airport was reported to be still under ISIL control, with Iraqi forces readying an assault to retake it. Meanwhile, PMU launched an assault to capture Tal Afar and captured two villages around it, killing 47 militants and destroying 13 booby-trapped vehicles in the process. Ammar Mustafa Yusuf (also known as Abu Ibrahim), ISIL's wali of Tal Afar, was killed along with his son in an airstrike by Iraqi Air Force on a village near Tal Afar. Jawdat announced that Iraqi forces had recaptured al-Bouseif hills during the day.

23 February

On 23 February, Iraqi forces backed by drones and heavy artillery attacked the Mosul airport, advancing from several directions towards it. They captured the airport later on along with 2 other villages near it. In addition, Brig. Gen. Yahya Rasoul also announced that Iraqi forces had captured an ISIL weapons storage warehouse, a former ISIL headquarters and the barracks at al-Ghazlani military facility. Jawdat also announced that Iraqi forces also captured a nearby sugar plant along with its residential areas. Meanwhile, airstrikes in western and southern Mosul reportedly killed 35 ISIL members including a regional mayor. ISIL also issued a death warrant against a senior leader named "Abu Osama" who had fled during the battle for Mosul airport. PMU meanwhile announced that Ali Abdel Kadim al-Saeedi, commander of its 10th Brigade, was killed in clashes with ISIL in Tel Afar. One of ISIL's emirs, Abu Dujana al-Tunsi, was also reported to have been killed during clashes in Tal Afar. An ISIL counter-attack to break Mosul's siege was repelled by PMU during the day. An ISIL rocket attack late in the day on soldiers stationed at Mosul airport resulted in dozens of deaths.

24 February

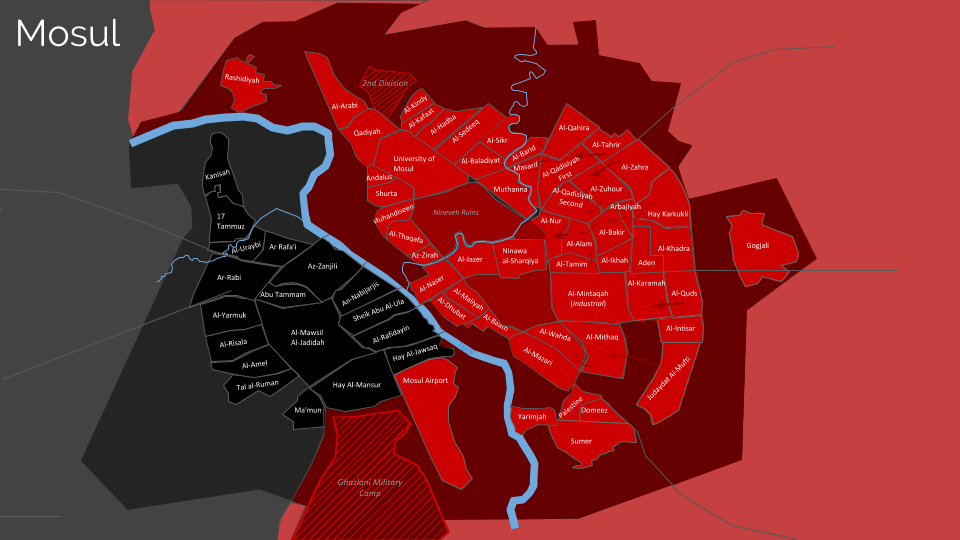
Battle situation in Mosul as of 24 February 2017.

On 24 February, Iraqi forces captured al-Ghazlani military base and entered a district in western Mosul for the first time. Jawdat announced that they had captured a sports facility in al-Tayyaran district. Sami al-Aridhi, a lieutenant-general of Counter Terrorism Service (CTS), also announced that Iraqi forces captured the Tall al-Rayyan village, outside Mosul, and entered al-Mamoun district.

25 February

Iraqi forces continued advancing inside western Mosul on 25 February. Brigadier General Hisham Abdul Kadhim announced that Federal Police and Rapid Response Division had captured Hawi al-Josaq and had begun clearing the Tayyaran district. Al-Saadi meanwhile stated that CTS pushed towards Wadi Hajr and al-Mamoun districts from two fronts and had entered both of them. Saadi later also stated that their advance had slowed and they were facing heavy resistance, especially in al-Mamoun, since its streets are organized randomly, making it difficult to set up roadblocks for countering VBIEDs. Shifa Gardi, a Kurdish reporter working for Rudaw, was killed by a roadside bomb while covering the advance of Iraqi forces. During the same day, PMU announced it had captured eight villages to west of Mosul. The Ministry of Defense's War Media Cell also announced that the 9th Armored Battalion of the Iraqi Army had fully captured al-Yarmouk power station, which supplies power to the whole city. ISIL destroyed a bridge to the Badush village to hinder the Iraqi advance while a coalition airstike on an ISIL convoy in the village killed 16 militants.

26 February

Iraqi forces advanced further on 26 February in order to gain control of the southernmost bridge linking Mosul's eastern and western sides. Clashes were also ongoing in Hawi al-Josaq and al-Tayyaran districts. Iraqi forces later captured al-Tayyaran and al-Maamoun districts. They also entered al-Mansour, al-Shuhadaa and Dawas districts. They also announced they had captured al-Harakiyat, an area south of the city used as a major oil-smuggling route by ISIL.

27 February

Iraqi forces advanced in Hawi al-Jowsaq, and announced they had captured the Fourth Bridge on 27 February. They later regained control of Jowsaq district. The operation command meanwhile announced that they had captured Tal Rumman village in western Mosul. They also entered and clashed with ISIL in Wadi Hajr district. Iraqi troops killed 120 militants and ISIL's designated "emir" of Dawasah district during advances towards central Mosul.

28 February

Iraqi forces advanced towards Mosul's main governmental buildings on 28 February. The CTS continued advancing in Wadi al-Hajr to link up with the Rapid Response Division and Federal Police stationed by the riverside. Jawdat announced during the day that 929 militants had been killed since the start of the assault on west Mosul. al-Jubouri stated that the 15th Division of the Iraqi Army was preparing to storm Tal Afar. Colonel Ahmed al-Jubouri of the Iraqi Army's Nineveh Operations Command later stated that Iraqi forces had captured the Wadi Hajr district. The Iraqi Defense Ministry's War Media Cell meanwhile announced that Iraqi forces had captured the Damerji village to south of Badush.

== March: Battle for southwestern Mosul ==
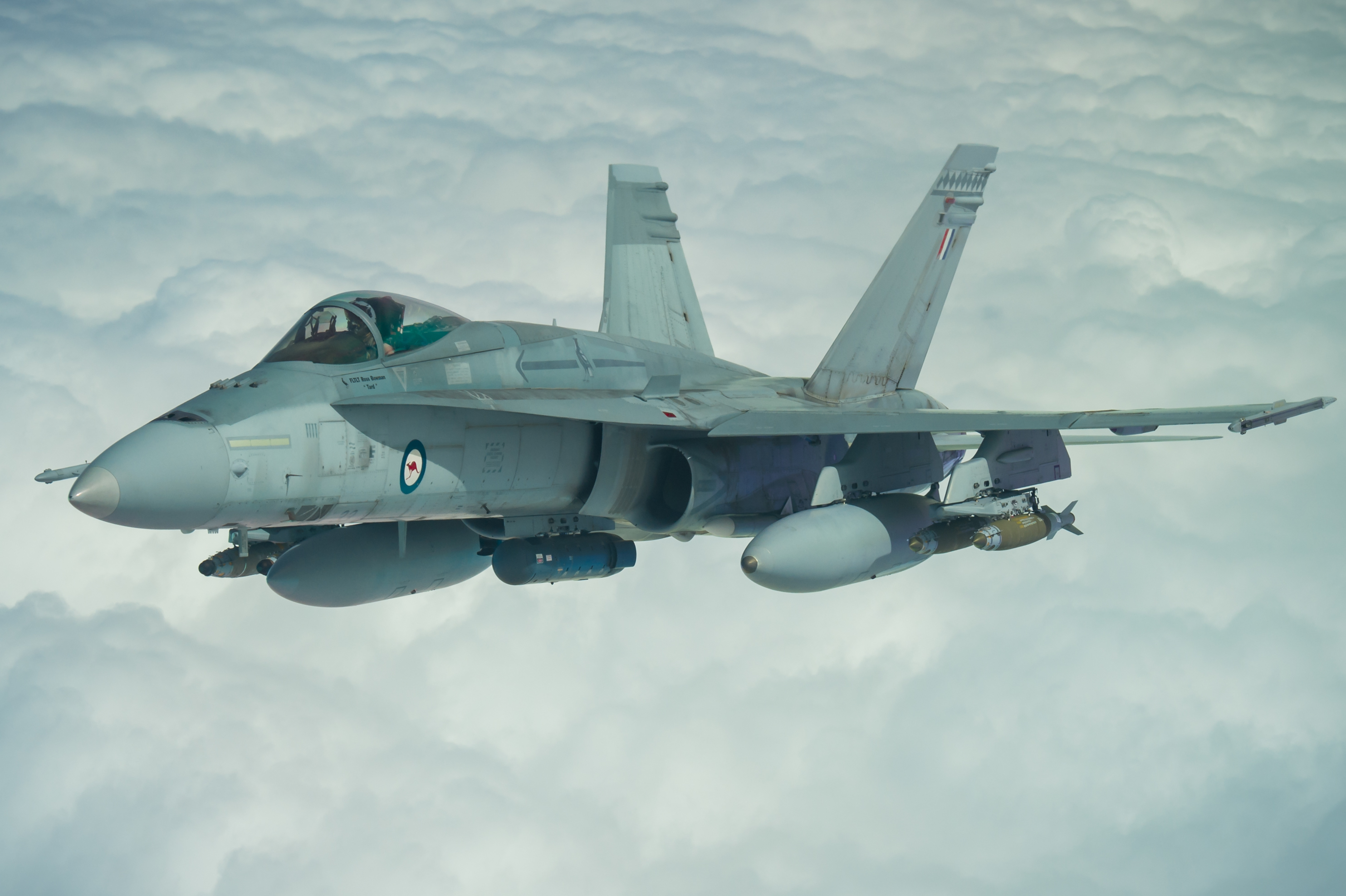
An Australian F/A-18 Hornet over Iraq in March 2017

1 March

ISIL held areas (grey) in Mosul, as of 1 March 2017.

On 1 March, an Iraqi general announced that the Iraqi Army had taken control of the last major road to western Mosul, with the 9th Armoured division coming within a kilometer of Mosul's northwestern entrance known as the "Syria Gate". This move effectively cut off western Mosul from Tel Afar. The CTS continued advancing and clashed with ISIL in the Wadi Hajr, al-Mansour, and al-Shuhada districts. The Joint Operations Command meanwhile announced that CTS continued advancing in Jawsaq and Tayaran, while capturing 70% of Wadi Hajr, completely cleared the residential buildings of al-Mamoun district, and advanced in the adjacent Mansour district. Major Adnan Mostafa later stated that Iraqi forces had captured Syria Gate, along with al-Rihani village, besieging Badush. They later captured the underground "Tadmour Base", which had been used by ISIL to train recruits, according to Iraqi commanders.

2 March

On 2 March, ISIL launched a counterattack on Iraqi forces during an overnight rainstorm during the night of 1–2 March, though the fighting subsided by morning. Some residents of the city alleged that an airstrike on the Omar al-Aswad mosque in al-Farouq districts killed a number of civilians and suspected ISIL fighters. A Coalition spokesman, however, stated that he was unaware of such a strike. A captain in Rapid Response Division meanwhile stated that advancing Iraqi forces were forced to retreat from Dawasah to Jawsaq, after falling into an ISIL trap of a fake withdrawal and taking many casualties. Abu Huthaifaq al-Halabi, a cameraman who recorded Abu Bakr al-Baghdadi's declaration of a "caliphate" in 2014, as well as ISIL's dewan of mosques in Nineveh Governorate, was reported to have been killed during the day, along with his son and an aide. On the same day, it was reported that 14,000 civilians fled western Mosul during the day.

3 March

Iraqi forces announced they had captured Wadi Hajr district on 3 March, an advance that allows them to link up all their forces in south of the city. The Red Cross meanwhile stated that a chemical weapon was apparently used in mortar fire on houses in east Mosul, the first such attack during the battle. 12 people were injured in the attack. On the same day, 14,000 people fled western Mosul, bringing the number of displaced civilians from western Mosul up to 46,000 people.

4–5 March

Jawdat stated that the Federal Police had repelled an ISIL attack on the outskirts of the Dawsah district, killing 10 suicide bombers and destroying 5 VBIEDs. The Defense Ministry' War Media Cell stated that an airstrike by the anti-ISIL coalition on an ISIL headquarters in al-Najjar district killed Abu Abdel Rahman al-Ansari, Jund al-Khilafa's official as well as 6 emirs including Abu Khalid, Sabah al-Anzi, Abu Azzam, Abu Hejab, Abu Sayah and Abu Taiba. Iraqi forces resumed their offensive on 5 March, after pausing it for two days because of bad weather. The Rapid Response Division was reported to have captured the Danadan district, coming close to a complex housing governmental buildings in western Mosul. Meanwhile, the CTS pushed through Somood and Tal al-Ruman districts. They also clashed with ISIL in Shuhada and Mansour districts. An ISIL leader alleged to be al-Baghdadi's cousin was reported to have been arrested in the Jowsaq district.

6 March

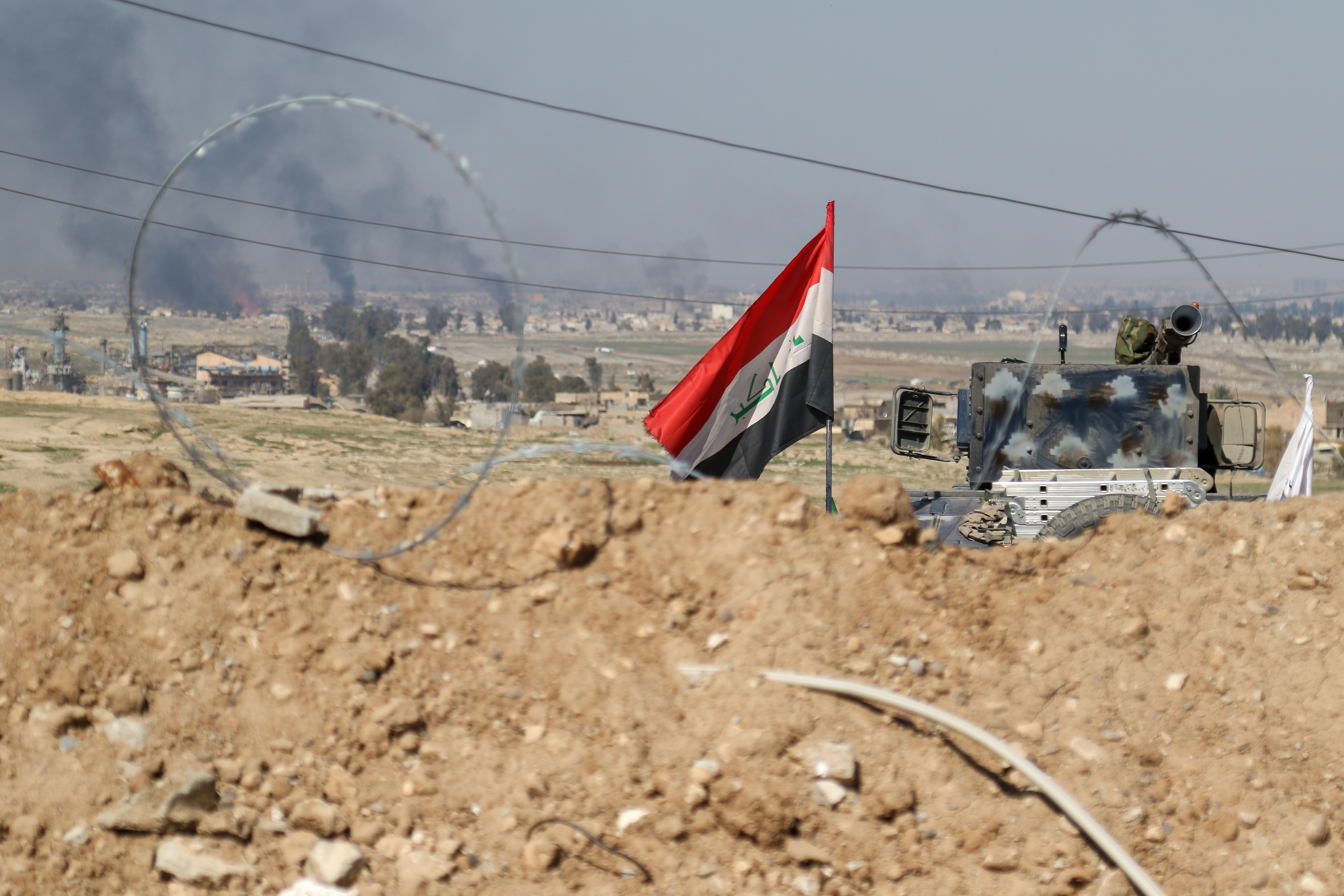
An operation to retake western Mosul, 6 March 2017

Iraqi forces captured the al-Hurriya Bridge (also called "Freedom Bridge") on 6 March. Iraqi military also announced that CTS had captured Somood district. The operation command meanwhile announced that the Rapid Response Division and Federal Police had captured the Nineveh police headquarters, the courts complex and the water, electricity and sewage directorates. The CTS assaulted al-Mansour district after capturing Somood. A Federal Police officer stated that an airstrike by the coalition on the city's train station had by mistake killed 33 former troops held there as captives by ISIL. Airstrikes at various districts were also reported to have killed 22 civilians and wounded 34. PMU meanwhile captured a strategic mountainous region near Al-Ayathia village.

7 March

Lieutenant Colonel Abdel Amir al-Mohammadawi announced that the Rapid Response Division had captured the Nineveh Governorate complex as well as the Mosul Museum, a central bank branch and a building housing ISIL's main court of justice. The operation command stated that the Federal Police had captured the Nineveh provincial government headquarters. It also announced that Iraqi forces had completely captured Dawasah, Danadan and Tal al-Rumman districts. Iraqi forces were also reported to have captured the Turkish consulate in western Mosul. Meanwhile, the Iraqi Counter-Terrorism Force announced that government forces had recaptured 60 percent of the western Mosul from ISIL.

8 March

The Iraqi military announced that Iraqi forces repelled an overnight counterattack by ISIL, and had taken full control of the last major road leading to Tal Afar. Major General Ali Kadhem al-Lami of the Federal Police stated that they will clear captured areas in western Mosul during the day. The military later announced that the 9th Armoured Division had captured the Badush prison, known for the Badush prison massacre committed by ISIL in 2014. Yarallah later announced that Iraqi troops along with PMU had fully captured al-Atshana hills and had stormed the residential apartments in the area of Badush prison after taking the prison itself. PMU meanwhile announced that they had also captured the al-Sabuniyah train station on the road between Mosul and Tal Afar and captured Tal Khazaf village near Mosul. Yarallah later announced that they had captured Mansur and Shuhada districts.

9 March

Iraqi forces continued to battle ISIL inside Mosul. Yarallah announced that the CTS had captured Moalimin and Silo districts. Iraqi forces also reached the Grand Mosque of al-Nuri from where al-Baghdadi had made a declaration of a "caliphate". PMU meanwhile captured 7 villages to the west of Mosul. It also stated that it had captured Badush power station.

10 March

Iraqi forces launched a raid during nighttime between 9 and 10 March. Iraqi forces were counterattacked in various neighborhoods and in the government complex under their control, with Captain Waleed Ibrahim stating they lost control of two streets. Despite the attacks, they continued advancing towards the Old City, reaching and fighting around the remaining streets near it. They also fought against ISIL around the Assyria Hotel. The operation command, meanwhile, announced that the CTS had captured al-Amil al-Oula along with al-Amil al-Thaniya district. Yarallah later announced that the Rapid Response Division, along with Federal Police, captured Nabi Sheet and Akidat districts. The Defense Ministry's War Media Cell also stated that Iraqi forces had captured 3 villages around Badush, taking control of the western bank of Tigris.

11 March

Iraqi forces pushed into the Old City center of Mosul on 11 March, amidst heavy clashes, and advanced in Bab al-Toub district, while CTS advanced inside Aghwat and Risala in the western front, and also advanced in the Nafet and Nablus districts. Meanwhile, Iraqi Army's 16th Division captured 2 villages to west of Mosul, as well as the Khwaja Khalil village, a compound of industry installation and a water facility to the west of Mosul, while the 9th Armoured Division along with PMU captured a part of Badush town and surrounded the Badush cement plant. Colonel Emad al-Bayati stated that Iraqi forces had captured al-Mahata area containing a train station and residential complexes. He also stated that they had stormed al-Abar area and had captured Bab al-Bayd and al-Farouq areas to south of Mosul. ISIL was also reported by residents of Mosul to have released dozens of prisoners who had been detained for small 'offences' such as selling cigarettes, violating a smoking ban, or being in possession of a mobile phone. The Iraqi state TV meanwhile announced that Iraqi forces had captured about half of western Mosul.

12 March

Brett McGurk announced that the 9th Armoured Division cut off the last road out of Mosul. al-Saadi stated that Iraqi forces controlled more than a third of western Mosul. He also stated that the CTS was battling ISIL inside the al-Jadida and al-Aghawat districts. Meanwhile, the operation command stated that the Rapid Response Division and Federal Police were attacking the Bab al-Toub district. The Military Intelligence Directorate announced that airstrikes by the anti-ISIL coalition killed Mahmoud Fathi al-Jabouri, a.k.a. Abu Rusol, the Administrative Official of ISIL, and also destroyed an explosive plant belonging to the group. The 16th Division, along with the PMU, captured 2 villages northwest of Mosul during the day. The Joint Operations Command later announced that CTS had captured the Aghawat district. Jawdat added that they had also captured Souk al-Arbaa and al-Remah Square in Bab al-Toub, in addition to Mosul al-Jadida (New Mosul) district.

13 March

Iraqi forces faced heavy resistance as they tried to advance in the Old City and to the Iron Bridge. Military officials stated that their advance was slowed due to heavy rain in the morning, though they came within a distance of 100 metres from the bridge. The Joint Operation Command later announced that the CTS had completely captured Nafet and New Mosul districts. Khamis Al-Khanjar, a prominent Iraqi Sunni politician who lobbied the United States and Iraqi governments to ensure that civilian losses in the battle were minimal, warned that civilian casualties were rising due to the accelerated pace of the campaign. He added that more than 3,500 civilians had been killed since the beginning of assault on western Mosul.

14 March

Iraqi forces continued advancing in the Old City and towards the Iron Bridge. A Federal Police officer announced that the Federal Police had killed Abu Abdul Rahman al-Ansary, ISIL's military commander of the Old City. Iraqi forces captured Mosul's train station, once one of the main rail hubs of Iraq. Jawdat also stated that they had captured the nearby bus station. They also captured the Baghdad Garage district. Iraqi forces were also reported to have arrested ISIL's Industry Minister and his assistant. Meanwhile, Jawdat stated that Iraqi forces had captured the Bab al Jadid and Bab al Bidh areas, and were in control of 90% of the Old City. Iraqi forces also captured 2 villages to the northwest of Mosul.

15 March

The Federal Police announced on 15 March that they had captured the Iron Bridge, with the Rapid Response Division, putting them in complete control of three out of five bridges in Mosul, and also advanced to the al-Nuri Mosque. Iraqi officers stated that cloudy weather was slowing their advance, due to unavailability of air cover. Staff Brigadier Falah al-Obeidi stated that the CTS had captured the Dor al-Sikak and al-Nafut areas, the sites of ISIL's main weapons facilities, located to the west of the Old City. The International Organization for Migration stated that the number of civilians who fled from western Mosul rose to 100,000. Samir Dawoud al-Mohsen, an officer of the 9th Armored Division stated that Iraqi forces had begun to advance on Bab al-Bayd district. Iraq's military intelligence service stated that 3 senior ISIL leaders were killed in airstrikes on al-Jadida district by the Iraqi Air Force, including: Abu Anas al-Jubouri, who was an official of the suicide bomber units, Mohamed Fathy al-Jubouri, who was a military official of the group, as well as his aide, Ahmed Nawwaf al-Jubouri. The 9th Armored Division also captured the town of Badush, as well as a nearby village, taking control of the entire Badush region. The CTS also advanced in the Nablus, Yabsat, Risala, and Wadi al-Ayn districts.

16–17 March

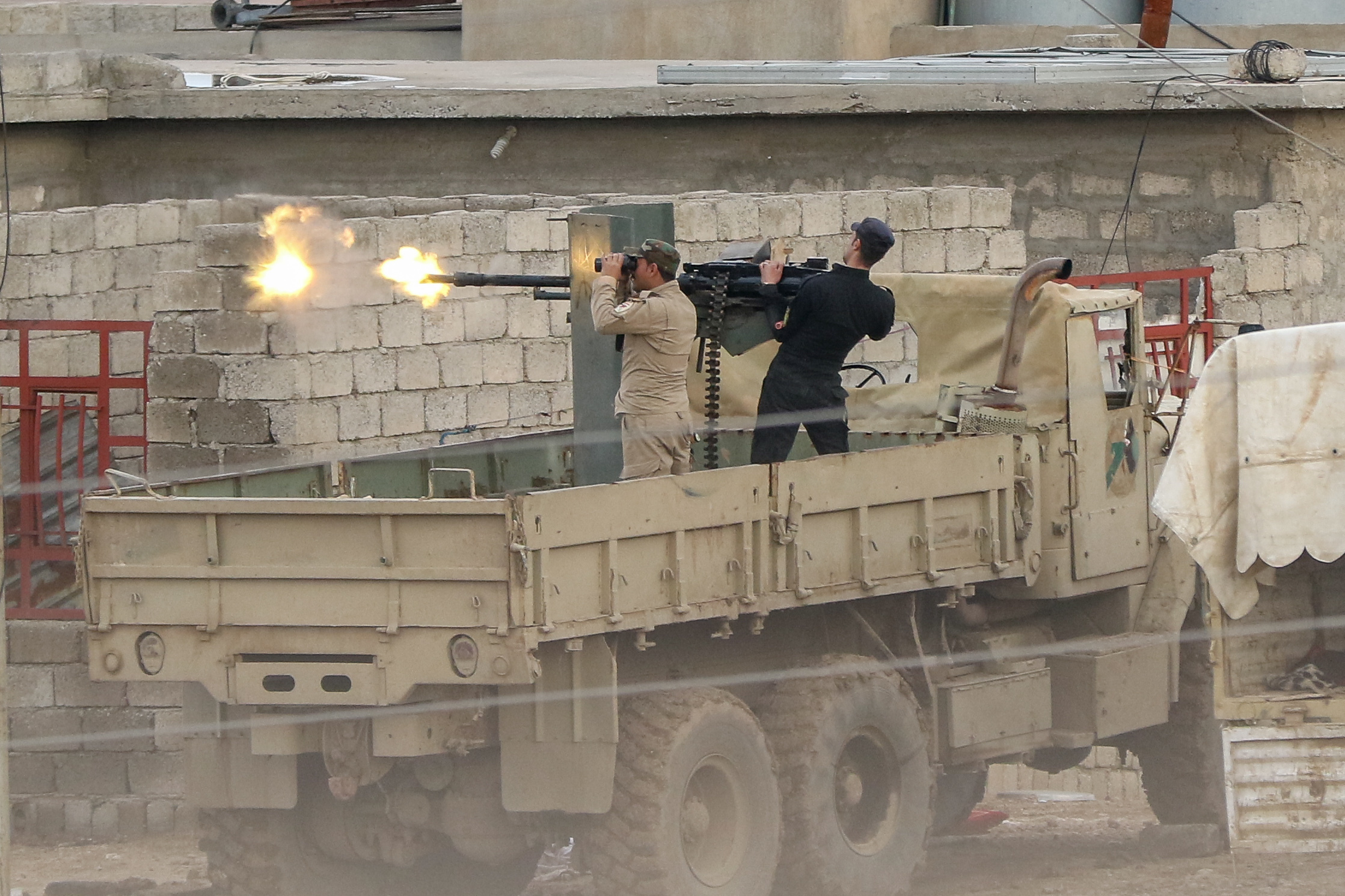
Iraqi Army fire a heavy machine gun at ISIS positions in Mosul, 16 March 2017

The Federal Police and Rapid Response Division continued to clash with ISIL in Old City, coming within 500 meters of the al-Nuri Mosque, though their advance was slowed by heavy rain. Iraqi forces also captured a hospital during the day. An ISIL attack on Badush was also repelled during the day. Iraqi forces continued advancing in the Old City on 17 March, trying to gain control of a main road used by ISIL to launch VBIEDs at their positions. A spokesman of the Federal Police stated they had captured al-Basha mosque, al-Adala street and Bab al-Saray market. Staff Lieutenant General Abdulghani al-Assadi also stated that CTS was advancing in the Risala and Nablus districts.

18 March

Jawdat announced on 18 March that they had captured the al-Arbiaa market and a grain silo overlooking the Old City. Adel Ahmed, captain of the Federal Police, meanwhile stated that they had captured al-Kur and al-Tawafa districts, allowing their use as corridors for fleeing civilians. Captain Yunis Mohammed stated that ISIL had launched a chemical attack on al-Adala, Bab al-Saray and Shaer Nineveh. He stated that 12 people were injured in the attack.

19 March

A police spokesman stated that Federal Police and Rapid Response Division had resumed their advance after pausing it due to bad weather. Iraqi forces clashed with ISIL to close in on the al-Nuri mosque during the day. Iraq's Defense Ministry meanwhile stated that the anti-ISIL coalition destroyed an ISIL command center, resulting in deaths of 6 foreign ISIL leaders including Abdul Kareem al-Rusi, a Russian leader who was the head of Tareq Bin Zayad brigade. Other leaders killed in the airstrike were identified as Salih al-Ahmed, Abu Duaa al-Magribi, Yousif Uwni, Abdulla Humoud and Milad Seiro. A police statement also announced the capture of Husam Sheet al-Jabouri, a local chief of ISIL's Diwan al-Hisba in Bab al-Sijin area. The Joint Operations Command announced that CTS had captured the Nablus district. It also stated that the 9th Armoured Division had captured al-Mulawtha area as well as a village to the north of Badush. A security source stated to the Arabic news-channel Skypress that they had also captured Khalid ibn al-Walid and Bab al-Sijin districts.

20 March

On 20 March, Federal Police and Rapid Response Division resumed their advance on al-Nuri mosque after fog and rain in the early morning, coming within 1600 feet (488 m) of the mosque. Iraqi forces stated that they had captured a residential complex near Badush cement plant. An Iraqi interior ministry official also stated that an Iraqi police colonel and eight other officers were captured by ISIL fighters after they ran out of ammunition during clashes in Bab Jadid district in the early hours. Rapid Response Division's media officer Lieutenant Colonel Abdel Amir al-Mohammedawi denied any police officers were captured though some Federal Police sources stated they had been killed. Meanwhile, Iraqi airstrikes targeted several IS locations in Tal Afar and Sinjar killed 47 militants and destroyed five booby-trapped vehicles, according to the Ministry of Defense. Another 20 ISIL members were also killed in Tal Afar, the ministry added.

21 March

Iraqi forces of the Interior Ministry continued battling inside the Old City where snipers were deployed to target the militants while CTS clashed in the western front on 21 March. The operation command announced that CTS had captured al-Risala and Shaqaq Nablus in the west. Yahya Rasool stated that Iraqi forces controlled about 60% of western Mosul. Brigadier Saad Maan also stated that bodies of the colonel and two officers kidnapped a day earlier were found, but denied they had been captured. PMU also announced that it had captured the residential complex, as well as two villages and Arheiya area near Badush. They also stated that they had reached the outskirts of western Mosul.

22 March

ISIL shelled areas captured by Iraqi forces, resulting in civilian casualties. The Federal Police blocked off roads in the Old City with earthen barricades to prevent VBIEDs from attacking their locations. A CTS officer meanwhile stated that CTS was advancing in Yabsaat district and the old industrial area. Iraqi military intelligence announced that Hassan Mahmoud al-Farahat, an ISIL commander of the group's artillery brigade, was killed in coalition airstrikes on his vehicle in al-Tank district along with his wife Iman al-Toukhi, who was a medical officer of the group. During the day, Yarallah announced that the 9th Armoured Division had captured two villages in the northern Badush district. The Defense Ministry stated that they also captured an ISIL command center in the region, killing more than 40 militants including a senior leader known as Abu Adul-Rahman.

23 March

Iraqi forces paused their advance in the morning on 23 March, due to cloudy weather. A police spokesman later said Federal Police reinforcements had moved towards the Old City and were preparing to storm it. Civil defense officials and locals meanwhile stated that dozens of civilians were buried under rubble after airstrikes in Mosul Jadida district a week earlier. Civil Defense chief Brigadier Mohammed Al-Jawari stated that 40 bodies were recovered while one Iraqi official put total casualties at 137. The coalition stated that the allegations will be investigated. Another 100 civilians were reported to have been killed in airstrikes nearby.

24–25 March

It was reported that Iraqi forces would deploy new tactics, as advances had slowed in western Mosul. U.S. Army Brigadier General John Richardson said that they might open another front on the Old City, to put further pressure on the militants. Brigadier General Yahya Rasool meanwhile stated that Iraqi forces had advanced, to recapture areas outside the Old City, including al-Yabsat. Civilians who fled ISIL-controlled areas, during the night between 23 and 24 March, reported that ISIL had fired upon them as they tried to flee Mosul. Meanwhile, Iraqi Observatory for Human Rights stated that about 500 civilians had been killed in coalition airstrikes over the previous few days. Jawdat stated that Iraqi forces had captured an ISIL command center in the Old City. A Federal Police spokesman stated on 25 March that military operations had been halted, due to rising civilian casualties. The Coalition confirmed that it had carried out the airstrikes in al-Jadida, a week earlier, where civilian casualties were reported.

26 March

Iraqi forces continued clashing in the city despite reports of the battle being paused. Iraqi military denied that coalition airstrikes had killed the civilians in al-Jadida a week earlier, claiming that the houses were rigged by ISIL and 61 bodies were found. Eyewitnesses, locals and some government officials contradicted these claims. During the day, Iraqi forces clashed with ISIL around al-Nuri mosque. Lt. Col. Ali Jassem of the 9th Armoured Division stated that Iraqi forces had raided and entered the Badush cement plant to where some ISIL fighters had retreated to. Yarallah later announced that the CTS had captured Wadi al-Ayn and Rajm al-Hadid districts. The Badush cement plant was also captured by the 9th Armoured Division during the day. Iraqi forces were also stated to have captured the Orouba district and the industrial zone in west of the city. It was also reported that they had captured the Badush Dam.

27–28 March

Iraqi forces stated on 27 March that they had launched new assaults in the Old City area with the Federal Police stating that they had started to advance in its southwestern part along with the Rapid Response Division. A police officer added that the attacks were the start of operations to besiege the area. Jawdat stated on the next day that Iraqi forces had tried to storm al-Midan and Suq al Sha'areen districts. Meanwhile, Townsend stated that the anti-ISIL coalition probably had a role in the airstrike that killed civilians in al-Jadida, adding that the civilians might have been gathered there by ISIL. A train station and the football stadium were reported to be captured by the Rapid Response Division. Some commanders of the ERD units meanwhile were critical of the Federal Police, with one officer stating that some of them deployed to hold newly captured areas in overnight raids kept withdrawing and ceding them to ISIL.

29–31 March

On 29 March, Jawdat stated that Iraqi forces were besieging the area around al-Nuri mosque and had captured the Qadheeb al-Ban district as well as al-Malab sports stadium. He also stated that the Federal Police had killed ISIL's health minister, Saadallah Abu Shuaib and his two guards near the Republican Hospital. Iraqi military's media office announced that the Iraqi Air Force had destroyed a security headquarters and two workshops making VBIEDs and booby-traps in Tal Afar. Meanwhile, US Army General Joseph Votel stated that 284 members of Iraqi security forces had been killed in the battle for western Mosul while more than 1,600 had been wounded in addition to the 490 killed and more than 3,000 injured during the battle for eastern Mosul. On the next day, it was reported that Iraqi forces had captured a village along with its train station to west of Badush. A spokesman of the anti-ISIL coalition meanwhile stated that less than 1,000 fighters were estimated to be left in western Mosul. Mosul's police chief stated on 31 March that ISIL had fired rockets into eastern Mosul. Clashes occurred in the Old City during the day, but Iraqi forces didn't attempt a new push.

== April: Slow block-by-block Iraqi advance ==
4–5 April

Airstrikes resumed on 4 April after the weather cleared. Iraqi military stated that Iraqi Air Force killed dozens of militants in airstrikes. Iraqi Military Intelligence meanwhile stated that 4 ISIL leaders had also been killed in airstrikes on al-Tanak district by the anti-ISIL coalition. It added that the commanders in charge of booby traps, Arab suicide fighters and child recruitment were among those killed in the airstrikes. Some intelligence sources stated that gas bombs launched by ISIL in Rajm al-Hadid district had killed 6 civilians and injured 29. Iraqi Joint Operations Command announced on 5 April that CTS forces had captured al-Maghrib district, west of Mosul's Old City center. They also advanced in Aabar and Matahin districts. The Federal Police and the Rapid Response Division continued to clash with ISIL on the southern and western front lines at the edge of the Old City center.

6 April

On 6 April, the operation command announced the capture of al-Yarmouk district, killing 42 militants in the process. It also added that the anti-ISIL coalition conducted airstrikes on an ISIL headquarters of suicide bombers, resulting in its destruction as well as killing of dozens of militants including some non-Iraqi leaders. Meanwhile, an Iraqi helicopter providing support to the Federal Police in the Old City was shot down by ISIL, resulting in the deaths of its two pilots. It was the first aircraft shot down by ISIL during the battle. The joint operations forces stated that it had crashed in eastern parts of Mosul. Meanwhile, Iraqi News quoted Maj. Gen. Najm al-Jubouri claiming that Iraqi forces controlled over 90% of the "western axis".

7 April

Iraqi security sources stated on 7 April that they had captured three more villages to the west of Mosul. Iraqi army officer Jabbar Hassan stated that the 9th Armoured Division had captured Ghazliwa after storming it in the morning. Yarallah stated that they had also captured the villages of Rihaniyah Qadima and Rihaniyah Jadida. The United Nations Office for the Coordination of Humanitarian Affairs meanwhile stated that over 264,000 people had been displaced from West Mosul since the beginning of the Iraqi military operations to capture it.

8–10 April

Mosul residents stated that ISIL had killed dozens of residents in the last few weeks. An army official stated on 9 April that the Governor of Nineveh Governorate, Nofal Hammadi al-Sultan, had escaped an assassination attempt on his convoy in east Mosul, with no injuries reported in the attack. A suspected chlorine gas attack by ISIL in the al-Hadba district of east Mosul was reported on 10 April, with an Iraqi security sources stating that 4 civilians had been killed and 6 had been injured. Meanwhile, Mutahin district was announced as captured by the operation command on 9 April. On the next day, it also announced that CTS had completely captured Yarmouk district along with Sikak.

13 April

The Joint Operations Command announced on 13 April that CTS had completely captured the district of Aabar. A security source also stated that Iraqi forces continued to clash with ISIL in the nearby Matahin and Urouba districts while also capturing most of Tanak district. Iraqi military also issued new instructions to civilians in the remaining ISIL-held districts to flee to avoid being caught in crossfire by spreading in other buildings. Advances of the Iraqi forces had slowed down in the Old City as they had limited use of bombs and were relying more on sniper fire. Jawdat meanwhile announced that the Federal Police had destroyed ISIL's command and control headquarters in the Old City. He added that a unit of the Iraqi military had killed 13 militants and destroyed 7 VBIEDs during a raid in the area. Iraqi forces announced during the day that Abdullah al-Badrani (also known as Abu Ayoub al-Atar), one of the seniormost religious leaders of the group had been killed in an airstrike by the anti-ISIL coalition. Jawdat added that two other leaders of the group, including Abdul Qadir Mahmoud al-Hamdouni, were killed in another area. During the day, Yarallah announced that Iraqi forces had captured three more villages in the outskirts of West Mosul. Iraqi Army also announced the capture of the western entrance of the city.

14–15 April

An Iraqi military source claimed that Gulmurod Khalimov had been killed in an airstrike in west Mosul a week earlier. Jawdat stated that the Federal Police had killed Mahmoud Ali Mahmoud, a militant leader and also took control over a network of tunnels beneath the Old City. Iraqi Defense Ministry meanwhile stated that Iraqi forces had taken control of a booby trap and VBIED-manufacturing factory after capturing al-Maloutha, located in the right side of Mosul. An Iraqi military officer meanwhile stated that ISIL had launched a gas attack in the form of a rocket filled with chlorine on Iraqi forces in al-Aabar district, injuring seven soldiers.

16 April

Jawdat stated on 16 April that Iraqi forces had advanced 200 metres inside the Old City and took new positions near al-Nuri mosque after the Federal Police and the Rapid Response Division advanced from the area of Qadheeb al-Ban during the early morning. Joint Operations Command spokesperson Gen. Yahya Rasoul stated that Iraqi forces had fully encircled the Old City area while CTS spokesman, Sabah al-Noaman stated that 2,900 ISIL members had been killed in the previous few days in western Mosul. Lieutenant-Colonel Abdul Salam al-Jubouri announced on the next day that Abu Quhafa, the leader of the group's "services bureau", had been killed by the Rapid Reaction Forces a day earlier. Meanwhile, it was also reported that all bridges in and out of western Mosul had become impassable due to flooding, resulting in suspension of aid supplies and escape routes for fleeing civilians being cut. The Federal Police accused ISIL of shelling Iraqi troops with chemical weapons agents in Urouba and Bab Jadid districts, causing minor injuries.

17 April

A media officer of the Federal Police stated on 17 April that they were engaging ISIL in heavy door-to-door clashes in the Old City and had advanced in the area, while a police spokesman stated that the troops were closing in on the al-Nuri mosque. Army Captain Jabbar Hassan stated that heavy clashes had erupted in al-Tanak and al-Thawra districts, with two Iraqi soldiers killed and Iraqi forces having made rapid advances in al-Tanak. Lieutenant-Colonel Abdul Salam al-Jubouri announced that Aziz Ibrahim Faris al-Anzi, ISIL' s head of security, had been killed in an airstrike near the Republican Hospital in the Al-Sihha district. He also added that another leader by the name of Ali Ibrahim Mohamed was killed in clashes with CTS in al-Tanak district. The United Nations meanwhile stated that over 493,000 had been displaced since the beginning of the battle with about 500,000 still estimated to remain in ISIL-held districts of the city.

18 April

A senior official stated on 18 April that more than 60 ISIL militants including a commander were killed in clashes with Iraqi forces who advanced in al-Farouk area in the vicinity of al-Nuri mosque. They also destroyed five armored vehicles, eight motorcycles fitted with bombs and six anti-aircraft batteries. Jawdat stated that they had captured a building being used as a health office by the group and had erected barricades around al-Farouk district. Iraqi state sources claimed the group only controlled six districts though this couldn't be independently verified. CBS News reported that an Iraqi unit with American and Australian advisers had been hit by a rocket containing mustard agent, injuring 25 Iraqis though the advisers were unharmed. Army Captain Khader al-Asadi stated that 16 civilians were killed in al-Thawra district by a suicide bomber that originally tried to target CTS troops stationed there but detonated in a residential area after he failed to reach them. The Iraqi Army built a new pontoon bridge over the Tigris river, opening an escape route for fleeing civilians.

20 April

A CTS spokesman announced that Iraqi forces had captured al-Thawra district while the Joint Operations Command stated that they had also captured al-Nasr district. Jawdat stated that Iraqi forces had killed a senior ISIL operative in charge of the chemical weapons in Mosul, in a guided-missile strike in the Zanjili district. Iraq's Military Intelligence Directorate issued a statement announcing that a coalition airstrike had killed the group's head of intelligence, Ahmed Khalid Najim, known as Abu Obeida, in Tayaran district. He also stated that Abu Abdulrahman, Baghdadi's first aide, was killed in a bombing by Iraqi forces. Other commanders killed by Iraqi forces are Abul Walid al-Tunisi, who was killed near the al-Awsad mosque in the Old City along with four of his bodyguards, a Russian commander known as Abo Maria, and a military chief by the name of Abu Baraa al-Dagestani, along with his aide Abu Abdul-Rahman al-Zamari, near the Fifth Bridge, as well as a relative of Baghdadi.

22–25 April

Military statements announced that CTS had captured al-Thawra and al-Saha districts. CTS commander Maan Saadi stated that the forces were linking up with the Federal Police, moving on the Old City from a different direction to complete its encirclement. Iraqi forces also stated that half of al-Tanak district was still held by ISIL. Yarallah from the Joint Operations Command announced on 25 April that CTS had completely captured al-Tanak district at the western edge of Mosul. Meanwhile, the troops inside the Old City pushed reinforcements into the area.

27–30 April

CTS spokesman Sabah al-Noaman stated that security forces had killed more than 500 militants and needed to capture four more districts before fully capturing the city. The Pentagon stated on 29 April that one U.S. service member was killed by an explosive device outside Mosul. The killed American was later identified as 25-year old 1st Lieutenant Weston Lee from Bluffton, Georgia. An Iraqi rights activist stated that at least 15 Iraqi civilians were killed when a warplane struck a house in western Mosul. Meanwhile, military sources stated that the Federal Police on 29 April had retaken positions lost after attacks on two positions on the edge of the Old City killed a Federal Police brigade commander and 18 other members of the Interior Ministry force a day earlier. Iraqi army's chief of staff, Lieutenant General Othman al-Ghanmi claimed that Mosul would be completely captured within three weeks.

== May: Slow progress around Old City center and assault from the northwest ==
3–4 May

Iraqi forces fought to recapture the Old City area on 3 May, tightening their control around the al-Nuri Mosque. The 9th Armoured Division and Rapid Response Division backed by the Emergency Response Division of the Iraqi Interior Ministry opened a new front against ISIL-held districts on 4 May, assaulting them from the north in order to accelerate the military operation which had slowed down to a great extent and allow other units to speed up the capture of the remaining districts. The Federal Police stated that they had advanced 1,400 metres and were pushing in the Hulela area towards the northwestern Haramat district. The troops were reported to have captured a village and a gas factory in the assault. Meanwhile, the United Nations stated that over 419,000 people had fled western Mosul since the assault on it began. The Joint Operations Command later stated that Iraqi forces had captured most of Mushairfah district including a water purification facility, taking new positions near residential buildings of Harmat while other troops cut off supply lines between ISIL-held Kanisah district and Najjar as well as 17 Tamouz districts. According to an ISIL security source, 81 civilians, including 29 women and 18 children, were killed and another 86 wounded during a missile attack on the El-Vela School in 17 Tamouz (17 July) district of western Mosul, while Iraqi forces denied targeting civilians, saying the building was being used by ISIL as a bomb factory. But it was later that an Iraqi Federal Police source admitted that at least 80 civilians were killed by an air raid in the area. An Anti-Terror Unit Captain Ali el-Behadili meanwhile stated that Habib Abdulcebbar, who was responsible for ISIL's war administration, had been killed.

5 May

Iraqi forces captured three villages after their assault from the north. An army statement announced that Iraqi forces had captured the Second Mushairfah district along with the Church and Mikhail's Monastery area. Brigadier General Walid Khalifa, deputy commander of the 9th Brigade, added that Iraqi forces had killed about thirty militants in addition to destroying five VBIEDs before they could be used.

6 May

Iraqi security official Safa al-Behadli stated that nine security officials were killed and three others were injured when ISIL attacked using four bomb-laden vehicles in west Mosul, also resulting in destruction of two military vehicles. Iraqi military announced during the day that they had fully captured the entire Mushairfah district though some officers stated that the fighting was still ongoing.

7 May

Iraqi forces met severe resistance from ISIL on 7 May while trying to push into the few remaining districts held by the group. Iraqi officers meanwhile stated that reinforcements from the Rapid Response Division had arrived in northwest Mosul to help clear areas on the banks of Tigris. Jawdat stated that Khaled ibn al-Waleed, a prominent Libyan ISIL leader and five of his sentries were killed when security troops bombed ISIL's police headquarters. Another 40 ISIL members were killed in police bombardment on al-Zanjili district.

8 May

The Iraqi Interior Ministry said that 3,320 militants were killed and 525 villages and regions were recaptured since security operations were launched on 19 February to retake western Mosul from Islamic State militants. Iraqi military intelligence stated that Jassim al-Basri (also known as Abu Mohamed), ISIL's leader for Mushairfah and Haramat districts, was killed by an anti-ISIL coalition airstrike. The Joint Operations Command announced that the 9th Armoured Division and Rapid Response Division had captured the Haramat district. A commander of the 9th Division stated that they had also captured the district's residential buildings, killing 17 militants. Meanwhile, Iraqi forces advanced toward 30 Tamouz district, with Federal Police advancing to the adjacent al-Iqtisadi district and opening a new front in southern 30 Tamouz. The CTS meanwhile advanced in Wadi Ikab, seizing most of the area.

9 May

Iraqi Joint Operations Command said that CTS had captured the Northern Industrial Area while a small district of 30 Tamouz had also been captured. Yarallah in a separate statement added that CTS had captured the northern part of the Wadi Ikab industrial area. According to a local police officer, ISIL militants attacked Iraqi police sites, killing one police officer and injuring four others. Another eight militants were killed in the clashes. Three PMU members were killed and six injured when ISIL attack their position in west Mosul. A spokesman of the Emergency Response Division said that 250 militants had been killed in the Haramat district in the previous five days.

10 May

Major General Maan al-Saadi announced on 10 May that CTS had captured the district of al-Maamel in the center of the right coast of Mosul. Lieutenant General Abdul Ghani al-Asadi meanwhile announced that an ISIL military commander for Islah al-Zeraie district, Abu Ayyub al-Shami and three of his companions had been killed during the clashes. After capturing Maamel, Iraqi forces stormed the Islah al-Zeraie district. They were also reported to be in control of half of the Kanisah district. Nineveh Liberation Operation commander, Lieutenant General Abdul Amir Yarallah, said that soldiers from the army's 9th Armored Division had killed 1,321 Daesh militants, including senior commanders, since February. Moreover, 139 explosive vehicles had been destroyed, 11 unmanned aerial vehicles shot down, another 61 militant hideouts, 10 bomb-making workshops and five command centers were also demolished. Separately, 20 ISIL members were arrested by police in the Karamah, Khadra and Kokceli neighborhoods.

11 May

Iraqi forces pushed further to besiege the Old City center. Jawdat stated that the Rapid Response Division backed by armoured vehicles advanced in Iqtisadiyn district, killing many militants and destroying 17 of their vehicles including 5 booby-trapped ones. Commander Abdul Ghani al-Asadi stated that CTS had captured a large part of Islah al-Ziraie district but refrained from capturing it completely to avoid civilian casualties. Lt Gen Othman al-Ghanimi meanwhile claimed the rest of Mosul will be captured by the Islamic holy month of Ramadan which is to begin on 26 May.

12 May

The Operations Command announced on 12 May that CTS had captured the first part of al-Islam al-Ziraie and had started a push into the second part. In a separate statement, it stated that the Rapid Response Division backed by Iraqi Army had cleared the Haramat district while advancing in Iqtisadiyn and 17th Tamouz districts. Meanwhile, Jawdat stated that the Federal Police had killed two key ISIL leaders, Abu Ali al-Basrawi and Abu Yousef al-Masry along with his assistant Radwan al-Muslawi. The Operations Command separately stated that the 9th Division, 15th Infantry Division and the Rapid Response Division had captured Haramat al-Thaniya district during the day. The operation command later announced that Iraqi forces had captured that CTS had captured the Islah al-Zeraie district. PMU separately announced that it had captured 21 villages around al-Qairawan, killing 77 militants and destroying 15 VBIEDs.

14 May

The Joint Operations Command announced om 13 May that the 16th Infantry Division of the Iraqi Army had completely captured the Hawi al-Kanisah district. Brigadier General Yahya Rasoul stated on 14 May that ISIL controlled no more than 9 percent of west Mosul. Joint Operations Command stated that CTS stormed the Ureibi and Rifaie districts in the early hours, while the 9th Armored Division along with the Emergency Response Division attacked 17 Tamouz. The 9th Division managed to destroy the defensive lines of ISIL in the northern part of 17 Tamouz. Udai al-Khadran, mayor of Al Khalis, said that he had received confirmation that an unnamed ISIL senior commander was killed in an airstrike along with four of his aides in western Mosul.

15 May

The Joint Operations Command announced that CTS had captured the Ureibi district while Iraqi forces clashed against militants in Rifaie, 17 Tamouz and Iqtisadiyn, all of which were partly under their control. Meanwhile, Federal Police chief Shaker Jawdat was quoted saying that his forces killed 173 militants including a leader during recent clashes in addition to destroying 40 booby-trapped cars.

16 May

The Joint Operations Command Brigadier General Yahya Rasool stated, during a press conference, that government forces control 89.5 percent of western Mosul and killed 16,467 ISIL members since the start of operation. According to him, 679 booby-trapping vehicles, 11 ISIL headquarters, 47 drones and 76 booby-trapping workshops were destroyed, while 6,661 bombs and 217 explosive belts were defused. He also stated that ISIL controlled only about 12 square kilometers of area in Mosul while Iraqi planes dropped leaflets telling civilians the battle was nearly won, also telling them to stop using all vehicles to avoid being misidentified as ISIL fighters. Col. John Dorrian of United States Air Force separately stated that the group was near total defeat. Meanwhile, CTS said that troops killed ISIL media official Jalal Ayoub Shehab, a Syrian national, in Iktisadiyeen district. Security forces also arrested a 25-member ISIL cell in the al-Sukkar and al-Seddiq districts, north of Mosul. A security source claimed seven ISIL members, including a commander in charge of booby-trapped vehicle attacks, were killed when unidentified fighter jets bombarded a house in the Iqtisadiyn district.

17 May

The Joint Operations Command announced that CTS had completely captured the Rifaie district. They also advanced in Iqtisadiyn and 17 Tamouz districts, large parts of both districts were under their control. Fierce clashes between Iraqi forces and ISIL militants in regions of Bab al-Toub, al-Mekkawi and Bab al-Jadid left 20 militants dead and others injured, Federal Police officer Lt. Gen. Odai Sami said. Meanwhile, more than 25 militants were killed in western Mosul, according to the Rapid Response forces. The UN Office for the Coordination of Humanitarian Affairs (OCHA) stated that about 275,000 civilians remained in areas still under ISIL control. A Federal Police officer meanwhile stated that 3 soldiers were killed by a suicide bomber in al-Rifaie during the day, while four police officers and three CTS soldiers were killed in Ureibi in two car-bomb attacks. Iraqi officer Sadoun Fahd stated that coalition airstrikes targeting a group of militants preparing for an attack against Iraqi forces had killed 25 civilians.

18 May

The Joint Operations Command announced on 18 May that the Federal Police backed by the Rapid Response Division had captured the Iqtisadiyn district. Federal Police chief Shaker Jawdat said his forces are in control of over 291 square kilometers of western Mosul and ISIL members set sewage networks at the south of 17 Tamuz district on fire with petroleum to prevent drones from tracking its members. A PMU commander stated that his forces have captured the Washington military airbase, west of Mosul, while ten militants were killed in the Ain Fathi village. Meanwhile, CTS managed to storm al-Najjar district, recapturing half of it.

19 May

Brig. Gen. Mohamed al-Jubouri, from the Rapid Response forces, stated on 19 May that the troops repelled an attack by militants who used 20 booby-trapped vehicles. Twelve militants were killed at Tamuz, Mesherfa, Najjar and al-Rifaie neighborhoods when troops repulsed the attack. Iraqi Joint Operations Command said that CTS recaptured Rawshan area in northwestern Mosul. ISIL militants from west Mosul fired five mortar missiles on al-Ghabat region, eastern Mosul, leaving two police personnel wounded, according to a security source. War Media Cell said that 9th armored division retaken the northern part of 17 Tamuz district and dozens of ISIL fighters were killed in airstrikes in western Mosul. An Iraqi official meanwhile said that over 526,000 had been displaced since the beginning of operation to capture West Mosul.

20 May

The Joint Operation Command announced on 20 May that the Federal Police and Rapid Response Division had captured the 17 Tammouz (17 July) district while the CTS had captured the al-Rabie district. Iraqi Federal Police said they retook 80 targets, killing 172 ISIL snipers and destroying 373 booby-trapped vehicles since the military operation began in western Mosul. Another 66 militants were killed, 13 vehicles and nine motorbikes were destroyed in the Iqtisadiyeen and 17 Tamuz districts. Iraqi special forces spokesman Sabah al-Numan announced that his forces had captured all areas assigned to them and had thus completed their mission, declaring that only eight square kilometers of Mosul remained under militant control. He added that they'll carry out any further operations if so ordered.

21 May

On 21 May, twenty militants, including senior leaders of Arab nationalities and Western nationals, were killed trying to reach an old bridge in Mosul. Lt. Gen.Abdul Wahab al-Saadi, CTS commander, said that his forces had captured 47 out of 74 residential districts from ISIL in western Mosul, killing hundreds of militants. At least 17 Iraqi soldiers were killed and others wounded in four suicide attacks carried out by ISIL in the northwestern Mosul, a local security official said.

22 May

Iraqi military announced on 22 May that CTS had captured al-Najjar district. Iraqi Federal Police forces meanwhile pounded ISIL targets in Mosul's Old City, as they prepared to storm the area. Unknown gunmen abducted the Nimrud neighborhood chief Khazaal Theyab al-Duleimi in east of Mosul, along with two others, according to a security source. It was later reported that the gunmen were from Hashd al-Shabaki, a militia group within the PMU. Two civilians were killed by an ISIL mortar missile and a bomb blast in Hawi al-Kanisa district, according to a security source and local residents. Meanwhile, seven ISIL militants were killed when a drone from the U.S.-led coalition pounded a house in Zanjili district.

23–24 May

On 23 May, the military engineers installed a new bridge across Tigris to allow the deployment of reinforcements ahead of what was described as a "final assault" on the remaining militant-controlled areas. Federal Police declared that they killed Abul Hassan al-Iraqi, in charge of military engineering, and Mohamed Mejbal abu Othman, military leader of western Mosul during an operation. Meanwhile, local residents reported that eighteen civilians and nine ISIL members were killed in an airstrike that targeted a house in Haderet al-Sada region in the Old City. Federal Police stated on the next day they have taken control of a building used by the ISIL called "legislative court of the soldiers state" in 17 Tamuz district, killing six ISIL members, while destroying a vehicle and three motorbikes. Federal Police Capt. Ahmed al-Obeidi said that dozens of militants were killed, including three suicide bombers, following the incursion into the al-Zanjili neighborhood. The Joint Operations Command stated that security forces were in control of about 97 percent of west Mosul.

26–27 May

The Iraqi Air Force dropped leaflets on 26 May asking civilians of the Old City to evacuate. Joint Operations Command announced on 27 May that Iraqi forces had begun their attack on remaining ISIL-held districts, with the Iraqi Army attacking al-Shifaa district and the Republican Hospital (Al-Jamhuri Hospital) situated near the Third Bridge (Alshuhada Bridge), the Federal Police attacking al-Zanjili and the CTS attacking al-Sihha al-Oula. The Tasnim News Agency quoted the Islamic Revolutionary Guard Corps stating that Shaaban Nassiri, a senior commander of the corps, was killed during military operations to capture the areas west of Mosul. Meanwhile, an Iraqi military statement announced the death of two Iraqi colonels and also that they killed 14 ISIL fighters during the clashes in Zanjili district.

28 May

On 28 May, the advance of Iraqi forces inside Mosul was reported to have slowed down. Iraqi officers stated that they had captured the Ibn Sina Hospital, part of the medical complex in al-Shifaa district. Al-Arabiya reported that the Third Bridge and the Mosul international hotel had been captured by Iraqi forces. Maj. Gen. Maan al-Saadi meanwhile stated that ISIL had begun to use women to defend the areas under its control. An officer of the Rapid Response Division told Anadolu Agency that 13 soldiers were killed in an ambush after seizing the Tibb al-Mosul town to the city's west. A local source said that twenty civilians were killed, while more than 25 others were wounded in an airstrike launched by the anti-ISIL coalition at al-Farouq street and Hadiret al-Sadah, north of the Old City.

29-31 May

Prime Minister al-Abadi claimed on 29 May that the battle was in its "last stages" and Iraqi forces controlled 95 percent of Mosul. Iraqi Federal Police said a drone shelling left 14 militants dead and nine motorbikes destroyed in the Old City. Media reports stated that the city would be completely under Iraqi control by 30 May. Iraqi Police forces took an ISIL-run commando training facility in Zanjili district. al-Saadi meanwhile stated that CTS had captured most of the Sihaa district, controlling about 70 percent of it. Meanwhile, 28 Iraqi security personnel were reported to have been killed during 29 and 30 May. OCHA stated that more than 600,000 people had fled west Mosul since the operations to retake it began, leaving around 180,000 civilians still living in ISIL-controlled areas. It was reported on 31 May through accounts of nearby residents that the group had started closing off the streets around al-Nuri mosque in anticipation of the battle with Iraqi forces, with dozens of fighters taking up positions around it.

== June: Battle for Central Mosul ==
1 June

Military sources reported on 1 June that more than 140 civilians had been killed during the previous six days, while trying to flee western Mosul, with 70 civilians reported to have died in an airstrike on 30 May. More than 750,000 had been displaced since the beginning of the battle, according to the UN. Iraqi Federal Police forces killed 12 militants in Zanjili district. Jawdat stated that they had surrounded all ISIL posts in Zanjili after seizing their communication devices and had shelled them with shoulder mounted rockets. Iraqi Federal Police forces were also reported to have pushed deep into the al-Zanjili and al-Shefaa districts (advancing 600 meters), and to be approaching the Bab Sinjar district. Seven civilians were reported to have been killed and 23 injured from ISIL shelling while fleeing Zanjili. Residents stated that due to the advances made by Iraqi forces, ISIL had begun moving out prisoners from the Medical City area in the northern part of the Shefaa district, and also ordered families in Zanjili to move to the Old City to prevent their escape. Meanwhile, Colonel Ryan Dillon, the spokesman for CJTF-OIR, said that ISIL militants controlled less than ten square kilometers of Mosul. United Nations High Commissioner for Human Rights Prince Zeid bin Ra'ad stated that 163 civilians were reported killed by the militants during the day.

2 June

A military statement announced on 2 June that the CTS had captured the Sihha district. Iraqi forces had also managed to capture parts of Zanjili and al-Shifaa. An officer from the Iraqi Federal Police said it killed an ISIL Hisbah (vigilantism) official nicknamed Abu Abdul-Rahman in western Mosul. He added that 500 militants still remained in the Old City. CTS spokesperson Sabah al-Nu'man said that 120 ISIL militants were killed in the operation to retake al-Sihha district from the ISIL. Lt. Dargam al-Haydari of Rapid Response Division told Anadolu Agency that 120 civilians had been killed in the previous two days by ISIL, some in executions and others in bomb attacks.

3 June

Iraqi forces were accused of using white phosphorus after a Kurdish TV station on 3 June captured an explosion with a bright white plume of smoke, typical of white phosphorus attacks. Iraqi officials announced that they would investigate the allegations. Lieutenant Ali al-Karbalai of the Rapid Response Forces told Anadolu Agency that 32 Iraqi soldiers had been killed in the previous day, including 12 by three bombers in al-Shifaa and thirteen by a series of car bombings in Zanjili. At least 230 civilians were reported to have been killed over the previous two days by militants, as well as Iraqi fighter jets in western Mosul, per a local source.

5 June

Jawdat said that the Federal Police had started attacking ISIL militants' defenses south of the Old City, killing seven members before besieging Bab al-Jadid. Capt. Abdul-Wadoud al-Anbari stated that the Rapid Response team had killed 21 ISIL members, including five snipers, in a "snap operation" in the al-Shefa district. A CTS commander said that only four square kilometers of the city remained under ISIL control. Iraqi forces were also reported to have advanced in Zanjili, capturing more than half of it.

7 June

On 7 June, Federal Police said that operations in Zanjili had left 34 militants dead, including ISIL leader Abi Baraa al-Tounsi, in charge of explosives manufacturing workshops in the Old City. Jawdat stated that Iraqi forces controlled 75 percent of the district. Kurdistan Region Security Council's Counter-Terrorism Directorate announced that Ahmed Hashim Hamid, known as Abu Hammam, the second man in ISIL's 'Sharia Diwan', was killed during the previous few days in western Mosul. Captain Sabhan Wali told Anadolu Agency that at least 11 Iraqi security personnel had been killed by an ISIL booby-trap in Zanjili.

8–9 June

The UN reported that more than 231 civilians had been killed by ISIL in the previous two weeks, including 204 in al-Shifaa over two days, while 50 to 80 civilians had been killed in an airstrike on Zanjili on 31 May. Jawdat meanwhile told Asharq al-Awsat that Iraqi forces controlled 85 percent of Zanjili. On 9 June, Federal Police killed eleven ISIL militants, including Yaareb al-Khatouni, a senior division leader, and Abu Amal, designated security committee chief, near the Nuri Mosque.

10 June

Federal Police Chief Jawdat issued a statement on 10 June saying that his forces had completely captured the Zanjili district, killing hundreds of militants and destroying 27 heavy machine guns, as well as dozens of booby-trapped cars. Iraqi forces meanwhile repelled an ISIL offensive to the south of Shirqat, with the group losing 24 fighters, while the combined death toll of troops and civilians rose to 38. An attack on two villages in Al-Shirqat district left 14 militants and 4 pro-government fighters dead.

11–12 June

Major General Ali Mohsen claimed on 11 June that Iraqi forces had captured more than half of the al-Shifaa district. Iraqi forces also stormed the Old City, with Joint Operations Command stating that they killed 23 militants as they entered the northern entrance of the Bab Sinjar area. Brig. Gen. Mustafa al-Azzawi stated on the following day that the Iraqi Army's 36th Brigade had established a foothold at the edge of the medical complex, overcoming heavy resistance.

13 June

The Iraqi military announced on 13 June that Iraqi forces had finished clearing the Zanjili district, with Joint Operation Command stating that Federal Police and the Rapid Response forces were clearing the northern part of the district of militants, in addition to removing large numbers of landmines and traps the militants had set. The statement added that the Federal police and the Iraqi Army, along with the CTS, continued to advance in al-Shifaa. Meanwhile, Federal Police chief, Shaker Jawdat announced that more than 1,200 militants, including 27 leaders and 214 snipers were killed, destroying 865 booby-trapped vehicles and defused 780 landmines while 300 square kilometers were retaken since operations began in western Mosul.

14 June

Military situation in Mosul as of 14 June 2017.

Over 100 militants launched a counter-attack on Iraqi forces on 14 June, infiltrating Danadan, where they took over a mosque that was later bombed by airplanes, according to security officers. The militants then moved to Dawasa and Nabi Sheet. While the clashes were ongoing, Iraqi security officials stated that eleven Federal police officers and four civilians had been killed in the attack. The militant group claimed it had killed 40 Federal police officers. A police commander later stated that Iraqi forces had repelled the attack and killed dozens of the militants, while a Federal Police officer added that operations were underway to drive off any remaining militants.

15 June

Iraqi military announced on 15 June that they had taken complete control of Bab Sinjar district, adding that they were about to complete the encirclement of the Old City, with the pro-government forces still battling to take control of al-Shifa. The Joint Operations Command stated that Iraqi forces had initiated a new advance in al-Farouq area.

16–17 June

Jawdat stated on 16 June that the Iraqi Police had taken control of 30 percent of Shifaa district. Meanwhile, UNHCR stated that 100,000 civilians still remained in the Old City and were practically human shields. Iraqi forces killed an estimated 1,800 ISIL militants during the first 16 days in June. On 17 June, Jawdat stated that Iraqi forces had captured the medical complex in Shifaa, killing 19 fighters in the clashes in addition to destroying six booby-trapped cars and four motorbikes. ISIL training centers in the vicinity of al-Jamhouri Hospital in al-Shifaa district have also been destroyed, and the hospital was successfully cordoned off. Lise Grande meanwhile stated that up to 150,000 civilians still remained in Old City.

18 June

Iraqi authorities dropped 500,000 leaflets over Mosul on 18 June stating they had started attacking from all directions, telling civilians to stay inside while warning ISIL to surrender or die. Mohamed Ibrahim, head of the security committee at the Nineveh province council, was quoted by Ikhnews saying that 1,500 members of the group were entrenching near the Nuri al-Kabeer Mosque. Iraqi forces stormed the Old City and estimated there were 300 fighters of the group left. Hisham al-Hashimi who advises several Middle Eastern governments on matters relating to the group said that Kanaan Jiyad Abdullah, also known as Abu Amna, ISIL's security services chief of the area was killed in the clashes. Another leader in charge of intelligence in Mosul, Shakir Mahmud Hamad was captured by Iraqi forces. Meanwhile, Iraqi forces bombarded ISIL locations in areas of Old City, killing 13 civilians and wounding another eight according to an activist.

19–20 June

Maj. Gen. Maan al-Saadi of CTS stated on 19 June that they had taken control of new areas in Old City's Faruq district. Bakhtiyar Haddad, an Iraqi journalist working for France 2, was killed in a mine blast while three other French journalists were injured. One of the journalists, by the name of Stephan Villeneuve, succumbed to his injuries on the next day. The operation command meanwhile announced that the 9th Armored Division had captured the southern al-Shifaa district, Bash Tapia Castle, Yahya Abul Kassem shrine, a juvenile prison, Maria Church, Nineveh Health Directorate and the Fifth Bridge. It later also released a statement that the 9th Armored Division had captured al-Shifaa district, thus encircling the Old City.

21 June

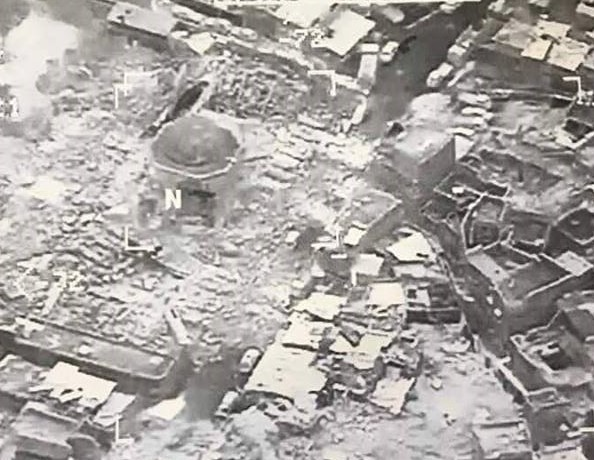
The al-Nuri mosque destroyed by ISIS, 21 June 2017

Iraqi forces began a push towards the Grand al-Nuri mosque on 21 June, with CTS coming within 200 to 300 meters of it according to a military statement. ISIL was reported to have covered many streets with cloth sheets to obstruct air surveillance. A CTS source told Xinhua News Agency that they had taken positions within 100 meters of it. Meanwhile, the operation command stated that Iraqi helicopters had destroyed an ammunition warehouse in addition to a vehicle of the group, killing 13 militants in total. The Great Mosque of al-Nuri, where the group's leader al-Baghdadi had declared a "caliphate" in 2014, was later destroyed along with its minaret known as "Al-Hadba". The Iraqi military accused the group of blowing it up after the Iraqi forces came within 50 meters of it, however the ISIL-affiliated Amaq News Agency accused U.S. aircraft of destroying it. A video was later released by the Iraqi military to back their claim. Col. John Dorrian of U.S. Air Force meanwhile denied they had struck the mosque, blaming its destruction on the militant group.

22 June

A total of 53 militants were reported killed in military operations in the Old City on 22 June. Shafaq News quoted security sources saying that troops killed ISIS explosives official Abu Furqan al-Maswseli, along with 15 others, at a house in the recaptured al-Shifaa district. Prime Minister Abadi boasted that the capture of the city was a "matter of days" while Col. Ryan Dillon stated that 2 square kilometers of West Mosul remained under the group's control. Iraqi Federal Police chief, Shaker Jawdat also said his forces killed 43 ISIL members in Ras al-Jada and Bab al-Beed in the Old City, and destroyed five booby-trapped vehicles.

23 June

Iraqi forces continued to fight toward the center of Old City, with a map published by the media office of Iraqi military showing the CTS advancing along al-Faruq street from north to south as well as along Nineveh street from east to west. The Iraqi military also stated that around 7,000 civilians had been evacuated from Old City during the past week. Another suicide bomber blew himself up among fleeing civilians in Mashahda district of Old City, killing 12 and wounding more than 20. The JOC also stated that the Third Emergency Brigade of the Nineveh Police Force had killed the group's leader, Jassem Akoub, in addition to the militants who smuggled him to east Mosul, across the Tigris. Meanwhile, Jawdat stated that the Federal Police advancing from the south had captured Shamoun Church and were advancing towards Zewani mosque. A medical source at Mosul's public hospital said that missile hit a market in Mosul al-Jadida, leaving 10 civilians dead and another 40 wounded. ISIL targeted a district in east Mosul with suicide bombing. A military statement released later said that five people including three policemen were killed while 19 were injured in the bombings.

24 June

Federal Police Commander Raed Shakir Jawdat stated on 24 June that two-thirds of the Old City had been captured and the Federal Police forces were approaching the district's SirgKhana neighborhood. Iraqi forces opened exit routes during the day for civilians to flee the Old City. French journalist Veronique Robert succumbed to her injuries received earlier in a mine explosion. A local source said that three elite ISIL leaders, including a Diwan al-Jund (Soldiers department) official, were killed by an airstrike on a hideout in outskirts of Tal Afar. Meanwhile, War Media Cell reported that two suicide bombers targeting Muthanna Market blew themselves before reaching the target after Iraqi forces knew about their plot, in eastern Mosul. The blast killed eight people, including three policemen and left another 19 more wounded.

25 June

Lieutenant Colonel Salam al-Obeidi states that less than one square kilometer of the Old City district remains under ISIL control and that Iraqi forces now controlled 65-70 percent of the district. JOC's Yahya Rasoul stated that only one percent of the city still remained under ISIL control, with 9th Armored Division having freed southern part of al-Shifaa, while fighting was ongoing in its northern part. He also stated that Iraqi Army were advancing in al-Farouq district and had captured part of al-Mashahda district. ISIL claimed to have captured Tanak and were attacking Yarmuk district, though the Iraqi military didn't confirm this. The military claimed that it had blocked an attack carried out by multiple suicide bombers on Hay al-Tanak. Maj. Gen. Sami al-Arithi, a senior commander of CTS, stated that his forces were 25 meters away from Nuri mosque's location. Counterattacks by the group were reported in Tanak, Rajm Hadid and Yarmouk. The Defense Ministry said in a statement that an ISIL drone factory in Shifa neighbourhood was seized with the help of civilians. According to a local activist, five members of a family were killed in an airstrike in western Mosul.

26 June

Iraqi forces stated that they had repelled the counterattack by ISIL, with casualties being reported including 20 of the group's fighters being killed. The militants had sneaked in by wearing PMU uniforms and about 40 militants were killed in anti-ISIL coalition airstrikes on westernmost edge of the city according to an Iraqi officer. Asadi of CTS stated that the militants were cornered in one or two pockets of Yarmouk and the security forces were searching it and Tanak house-to-house. He also added that Iraqi forces had linked up at al-Faruq street and will start pushing towards the river, boasting the battle will end in days. Yarallah announced that CTS had captured Faruq al-Awla neighborhood. Jawdat stated that Iraqi forces had captured ISIL's main hospital in Bab al-Beed.

27 June

JOC announced on 27 June that about half of the Old City was under control of Iraqi forces with Iraqi Army's 16th Division had captured al-Mashahda neighborhood in the Old City. It also added that the Federal Police had captured al-Bayd and Raas al-Jadda areas. Nineveh Police released a statement claiming that six ISIS members were killed while attempting to infiltrate Rajm Hadid region, west of Mosul. The military stated that the Federal Police had dislodged the militants from the Zewani mosque, and were a few days away from ousting the militants from the city. Jawdat stated that about 600 meters of distance remained between the forces and the Corniche road, reaching upon will bring the battle to a "conclusion".

28–29 June

The Iraqi military announced in a statement that the Army's 16th Division had captured Hadarat al-Saada and al-Ahmadiyya neighborhoods to the northwest of al-Nuri mosque in the Old City. The military also added that security forces had killed five militants who were trying to flee across Tigris to east Mosul. Jawdat stated that on 29 June that the Federal Police had advanced 200 meters towards Sirijkhana neighborhood, considered to be the last stronghold of the group in Old City's right bank area. He also stated that Iraqi drones had bombarded the group's mobile targets, killing 12 militants while seizing an anti-aircraft weapons lab. Abdul-Ghani al-Assadi stated that Iraqi forces had killed more than 600 militants during the fight to take over the site of the al-Nuri mosque and freed more than 900 families in Old City. He added that fighting was still ongoing in neighborhoods of al-Maidan, Sirjkhana and Ras al-Khour in the Old City. The ruins of Great Mosque of al-Nuri were later captured by Iraqi forces. After its capture, Prime Minister Abadi declared that the group's self-styled "caliphate" had ended. Meanwhile, the military statements announced that CTS had captured the mosque in addition to the al-Hadba and Sirjkhana neighborhoods. The Federal Police's media office announced that their forces took over al-Saa'a Church and Omar al-Aswad mosque in Bab Jadid neighborhood in the Old City. During the day, Col. Ryan Dillon stated that the "liberation of Mosul was imminent." 14 militants including two suicide bombers were killed in clashes according to Iraqi officials, and Federal Police officer Lt. Abdul Bari Faleh al-Jamous said 12 militants were killed in Bab al-Jadid.

30 June

CTS Major General Maan al-Saadi stated that it would take four to five days to capture the last areas along Tigris held by ISIL which were defended by 200 militants. He added that Iraqi forces continued to advance in Midan neighborhood of Old City. JOC announced that Iraqi Army's 16th Infantry Division had captured al-Faruq al-Thaniyah neighborhood in the northern part of Old City. It also added that CTS had captured Sha'areen commercial area, an adjacent area containing the mosque of Prophet George as well as the Abed-Khoub area in the northern part of the Old City. As many as 18 security forces, including two officers, were killed in clashes in Bab Laksh district of Old City. In addition, Iraqi forces killed 54 militants in Old City while seizing and destroying various weapons and a communications center of the group. They also announced complete control of the Our Lady of the Hour Church, Omar al-Aswad mosque, Karar mosque, and the south of Aserjkhanh area. Abu al-Baraa al-Mousal, ISIL's battle commander in Tal Afar, conceded defeat in Mosul and ordered his forces to stand down. An Iraqi Federal Police officer told Anadolu Agency some days later that around 213 civilians were killed between 24 June and 30 June during clashes in the Old City.

== July: Clearing the Old City ==
1–2 July

The Iraqi military announced on 1 July that the Federal Police had captured the last bridge under ISIL control, effectively cutting off the group's last escape route. A Federal Police officer stated that they had also captured Arbiaa Market, the mosques of Ka'ab bin Malik and Omariyah as well as the surrounding residential areas. The JOC announced that they had also captured the northern part of al-Shifaa district along with Rapid Response Division, freeing a hospital compound along with a main water facility of west Mosul while killing dozens of militants. The troops captured Ibn Sina teaching Hospital along with other medical facilities including a blood bank and a clinic in the area. Jawdat declared that his forces had completed their mission in southern parts of the Old City. A military statement on 2 July announced that CTS had captured the Makawi district.

3 July

The JOC announced on 3 July that the 16th Infantry Division had captured Khatoniyah, Tuwalib and Ra's al-Kour, killing 67 militants while also evacuating 961 civilians. In addition battle with remnants in al-Shifaa continued. Two female suicide bombers hiding among civilians targeted Iraqi forces during the day, killing one soldier. Another attempt by seven women in Mosul was foiled with some exploding themselves on fleeing families. According to a map published by the military media office, ISIL forces occupied a rectangle-like area around 300 by 500 meters beside the Tigris river.

4 July

Major General Najim al-Jubouri, commander of Nineveh's Operations Command, said in a press release on 4 July that the declaration of "liberation of Mosul" will be declared within two days. He added that around 400 metres remained under ISIL control in some areas and the declaration will be made after capture of al-Maydan. Iraqi forces slowed their advance on the remaining areas as the area contained large number of militants and civilians, with an Iraqi commander estimating about 10,000 civilians remaining in areas under militant control. Jawdat stated that Iraqi troops had captured Saray Door area and several other areas towards Khalid Ibn Walid street and al-Nujaifi area. The JOC announced that Federal Police had captured a commercial area and a mosque. During the day, Prime Minister Abadi congratulated Iraqi forces over what he called a "big victory" in Mosul. Meanwhile, Mohamed Zubaidi, an Iraqi Federal Police officer, speaking to Anadolu Agency said that 213 civilians had been killed in the period from 24 to 30 June during clashes in the Old City.

5 July

The Iraqi military stated on 5 July that ISIL was resorting to increased use of suicide bombers to try to slow the advance of Iraqi forces. New Zealand Army Brigadier Hugh McAslan stated that about 250 square meters remained under militant control. Yarallah announced that Iraqi troops had captured al-Khatuniya and al-Tawaleb districts of the Old City. Abdul-Wahab al-Saidi, a senior commander of the CTS stated that only 150 meters remained under the group's grip in the Old City, adding that 20 ISIL militants had detonated themselves in the last three days, while his troops had killed 150 militants in the last two days. Meanwhile, Major General Aifan Al-Dulaimi, head of the Rapid Response Division, told Anadolu Agency that fighting still continued at Dhaka Baraka, Ras Al-Kor, Al-Shaareen market, Nineveh Street, Najafi and Sheikh Abu Al-Ola Street in the Old City. He also added that nine Iraqi security members and 18 militants were killed in the clashes. A local source said that ISIL had launched an attack on Imam Gharbi village, near Qayyarah south of Mosul, killing 13 pro-government militiamen and injuring 14 others. By this time, French forces had conducted 600 airstrikes and 1,200 artillery shelling during the battle, according to French armed forces spokesman Colonel Patrick Steiger.

6–7 July

Lise Grande stated on 6 July that 15,000 to 20,000 civilians still remained in territory under ISIL control in the city. A security source said that Rapid Response forces commander, Cap. Hamid al-Azzawi, was killed near al-Sarjkhana. A source also said that CTS troops are 100 meters from the Tigris River at al-Midan region, and killed ten suicide attackers during the advance. Iraqi security sources stated on 7 July that ISIL had attacked the Iman Gharbi village, south of Mosul, likely as a diversionary attack. A number of people, including two journalists, died in the attack, while two other journalists were injured as they covered the counterattack by ISF to retake the village. Some local residents were taken hostage. The sources stated that the militants were still in control of half the village by the evening. A counterattack by 50 to 100 militants in the Old City on the army's 16th Division pushed Iraqi forces back about 75 meters, according to an Iraqi officer. A security source later told Xinhua News Agency that the Federal Police had captured Souq al-Saghir area and the adjacent al-Najafi thoroughfare, while the CTS and the 9th Armored Division further restricted the area under militant control, after capturing parts of Shahwan and Ras al-Kour districts. Another security source stated that two of the journalists trapped in Imam Gharbi were freed, along with two police officers, as Iraqi forces continued battling to retake the village. The JOC meanwhile announced killing eight militants near Sheikh Al-Shatt Mosque in the Old City, including Abu Zaid, who held the rank of amir in the group.

8 July

The JOC stated on 8 July that Iraqi forces had killed 35 militants and arrested 6 others as they tried to infiltrate the eastern side of Mosul from the west. Brig. Gen. Yahya Rasoul meanwhile stated that Iraqi forces were in full control of the Old City despite sporadic clashes in some pockets. The JOC later announced that the Federal Police had captured the Bab al-Toub neighborhood of the Old City and the adjacent Souq al-Saghah area. In a separate statement, it also announced that the 9th Armored Division had captured the Daka-Baraka area and a mosque in the remaining militant-controlled pocket along the Tigris. Iraqi military commanders stated that they would take control of Mosul at any moment. The Amaq News Agency stated that "fierce fighting" was ongoing around the Maydan district and also released a statement of the remaining militants to "fight until death". Iraqi state TV claimed that dozens of militants had been killed in clashes during the day. Brig. Gen. Robert Sofge of United States Army stated that the announcement of victory was imminent and the militants only controlled two blocks.

9 July

About 100 militants were reported to remain in the last militant-controlled territory. Iraqi state TV later announced on 9 July that Iraqi forces had reached the Tigris river and raised the Iraqi flag on its riverbank. The JOC announced that the CTS had captured al-Maidan area of the Old City, with a security source stating that the CTS and the 9th Armored Division were still fighting to capture Qlei'at and al-Shahwan neighborhoods. Iraqi Prime Minister Haider al-Abadi arrived in Mosul during the day and hailed "victory" over ISIL, congratulating the Iraqi forces and civilians for it according to his office. Fighting with remaining militants continued even after Abadi's declaration. His spokesman, Saad al-Hadithi, said that victory would not be formally declared until the remaining militants were cleared from the city. Abadi later stated that declaration of victory was a matter of time and the battle was settled with the remaining ISIL pockets encircled. He added that Iraqi forces were fighting to free civilians held as human shields in about 50 to 100 houses.

== Declaration of victory and capturing the final pocket of resistance ==
10 July

Early on 10 July, about three dozen ISIL militants were still holding in a small pocket near the western bank of the Tigris River. However, an Iraqi commander stated that those militants can only surrender or die. Iraqi forces attacked four small militant-controlled pockets in Qulayat and Shahwan. Rapid Response officer Mohamed al-Oqaily stated that 13 militants had been killed in clashes in the two areas since the day before. Prime Minister Abadi later formally declared victory over ISIL in Mosul in the operations room of CTS. Later on the same day, Iraqi Prime Minister al-Abadi again formally declared victory in Mosul. The United States-led anti-ISIL Coalition also reported that the city was "firmly" under the control of Iraqi forces and welcomed Abadi's announcement of victory, while also noting that the Old City areas still had to be cleared of explosives and possible hiding militants. Abadi emphasized that Iraqi soldiers were the sole force on the ground and there were no foreigners involved in the capture of Mosul.

11–14 July

Heavy clashes and shelling continued even after al-Abadi's victory declaration, specifically in the al-Maydan area of the Old City, with multiple airstrikes pounding the area. An Iraqi official stated that the military activity was due to clearing operations, targeting hidden militants. On 13 July, the US stated there could be 200 ISIL fighters remaining in the city, and the Coalition conducted airstrikes against 19 ISIL fighting positions. Most of those remaining ISIL forces were holding a small pocket of territory in the Old City's Maydan District, about the size of a city block in Manhattan, New York City. Another 22 fighting positions and a tunnel were destroyed by the CJTF-OIR the next day, as Iraqi forces hit further pockets of resistance.

15–17 July

On 15 July, Lieutenant General Abdul-Amir Yarallah, head of the Nineveh Operations at the Joint Operations Command stated that over 25,000 militants were killed in the battle, including 450 suicide bombers. He also added that 1,247 booby-trapped cars, 1,500 "diverse vehicles", and 130 drones were shot down. On 17 July, clashes continued in Mosul's Old City. An Iraqi soldier was killed and another was wounded in the Shahwan neighborhood, with four ISIL tunnels destroyed, as clearing operations continued.

18–21 July

Clashes continued into 18 July, with a civilian being killed in a firefight in al-Hayy al-Zera'i.e., Old City near the Tigris River. Meanwhile, an Iraqi officer revealed that 5 female German militants wearing suicide vests were arrested on 13 July in Old City after they were found hiding in an ISIL-built tunnel. On 20 July, clashes in the Old City intensified, as an estimated 150 ISIL suicide fighters in the Maydin neighborhood attempted to launch one last massive suicide attack instead of surrendering, with the militants holding an estimated 250 civilian families hostage. The clashes persisted until 21 July, when the final ISIL pocket in the Maydan District fell to the Iraqi Army. Following the fall of the final ISIL pocket, clashes died down across Mosul city, although sporadic clashes would continue to erupt in parts of Mosul city for another few months.

== See also ==
- Timeline of the Battle of Mosul (2016–17): Phase One
- Timeline of the Battle of Mosul (2016–17): Phase Two
