= 2019 Mokha restaurant bombing =

- Part of Yemeni civil war (2014-present)
- Location: Mokha, Yemen
- Date: January 28, 2019
- Deaths: 7
- Injuries: 20
- Victims: One Abu Dhabi TV journalist killed, one injured
- Perpetrator: Unknown

On January 28, 2019, a bomb exploded in a cafe in Mokha, Yemen, killing seven people including Emirati photojournalist Ziad al-Shaarabi.

== Background ==
By late 2018 and early 2019, the Yemeni coastal city of Mokha was under the control of the Yemeni Armed Forces and was a major base of the United Arab Emirates. The city had not seen many major attacks by either the Houthis or other Yemeni militant groups like the Islamic State's Yemen Province or Al-Qaeda in the Arabian Peninsula (AQAP). Mokha was being used as a logistical hub to support an Emirati and Yemeni offensive on Hodeidah.

== Bombing ==
The bombing was caused by an explosives-laden motorcycle situated near a bustling market in Mokha. Several Emirati journalists from Abu Dhabi TV were at a restaurant in the market when the bomb exploded. Faisal al-Dhahbani, an Emirati journalist who survived the attack, was working alongside his coworker Ziad al-Sharaabi, both of whom were in Mokha to cover clashes in western Yemen between the Houthis and the Yemeni government. Seven people were killed in the attack, including al-Sharaabi. Another twenty people, including al-Dhahbani, were injured.

The perpetrator of the bombing is not known.
