= Hodeidah International Airport =

Airport in Yemen

Hodeida International Airport
- IATA: HOD; ICAO: OYHD

Summary
- Airport type: Public / Military
- Serves: Al Hudaydah
- Location: Al Hudaydah, Yemen
- Elevation AMSL: 12 m / 41 ft
- Coordinates: 14°45′10.8″N 042°58′34.81″E

Map
- Location of airport in Yemen

Runways
Direction	Length		Surface
Direction	m	ft	Surface
03/21	3,000	9,843	Asphalt

Hodeidah International Airport is an airport in Hodeida, Yemen (IATA: HOD, ICAO: OYHD).

== Airlines and destinations ==
As of 2021, there are no longer any scheduled services at the airport after Yemenia suspended all routes in 2015 due to the ongoing regional conflict. Previously, the airline served a handful of domestic and international destinations.

== Military usage ==
The base is home to Al Hudaydah Air Base which is home to the Al Hudaydah Air Brigade which consists of 6 Squadron and a detachment from 128 Squadron.

== Yemeni civil war and Gaza war ==
The airport was heavily involved in the conflict and was the scene of the Battle of Al Hudaydah. The Saudi-led coalition moved to capture the airport on 13 June 2018 on the first day of the battle. The airport was partially captured by coalition forces in June 2018, though Houthi forces still held onto part of the complex.

=== Airstrikes ===
On June 7, 2024, British and US forces have carried out 4 airstrikes on the Hodeidah Airport and other locations in Yemen, targeting Houthi assets during Gaza war.

On June 18, 2024, British and US forces have carried out airstrikes on the Hodeidah airport again and also attacked Kamaran Island.

On July 18, 2024, British and US air forces have carried out 3 airstrikes on the airport. They have also previously airstruck the airport on July 12.

On March 22, 2025, US naval forces carried out 3 airstrikes on the Hodeidah Airport and 5 other strikes on the city of Marib. No casualties or damages were reported.

On May 6, 2025, Israeli forces carried out airstrikes on Hodeidah airport in retaliation for the Houthis firing a missile at Ben Gurion Airport. The strikes killed 3 and injured 30. The Israeli military said that it had fully destroyed the airport. After the attack the Houthis shut down the area around the airport.

== See also ==
- List of airports in Yemen
