= Battle of Hodeidah =

Battle of the Yemeni Civil War

- Part of the Yemeni Civil War, the Al Hudaydah offensive, and the Saudi Arabian-led intervention in Yemen
- Hadi Government's advance in 2018 of the al Hudaydah offensive Hadi Government control Houthi control
Date	13 June–27 November 2018 (5 months and 2 weeks) (Note: First phase: 13–22 June 2018 (1 week and 2 days) Second phase: 9–16 September 2018 (1 week) Third phase: 1–27 November 2018 (3 weeks and 5 days))
Location	Hodeidah, Yemen 14°48′08″N 42°57′04″E
Result	Houthi victory: The UAE announces a pause to the military operations on 23 June 2018, because of UN-brokered talks; The battle resumed on 9 September 2018 after peace talks collapse due to Houthi absence in Geneva peace talks.; A UN-brokered ceasefire was agreed upon on 13 December 2018, giving both parties 21 days to fully withdraw their troops from the city; In January 2019, the UN Mission to Support the Hodeidah Agreement begins; Pro-government forces withdraw from the city in November 2021, ceding control of Hodeidah to the Houthis
Territorial changes	Saudi-led coalition claims capture of territory around Hodeida International Airport from Houthi militants on 16 June 2018 and the capture of the airport itself on 20 June 2018; Houthis recapture the airport, or at least parts of it, by 22 June, with the Saudi-led coalition positioned five kilometers from the facility; Saudi-led coalition forces seize control of key Houthi supply routes from Hodeidah to Sanaa on 11 September; Houthis reclaim the city and its surrounding towns

Belligerents
Cabinet of Yemen: National Resistance; Tihamah Resistance; Giants Brigades; United Arab Emirates; Sudan; Southern Resistance; Saudi Arabia	(Yemen) Supreme Political Council: Houthis

Commanders and leaders
Tareq Saleh	Abdul-Malik al-Houthi

Units involved
Yemen: National Resistance; Republican Guard; Special Security Forces; Popular Resistance; Giants Brigades; Tihamah Resistance; Southern Resistance: Security Belt; United Arab Emirates: UAE Armed Forces; Sudan: Sudanese Armed Forces; France: French Navy; French Special Forces	Houthis: Yemeni Marine and Coastal Defense Command; Supreme Revolutionary Committee

Strength
c. 25,000 c. 1,500 troops	1,000–10,000

Casualties and losses
28 Yemeni soldiers killed (per medical sources, airport battle, by 21 June); 4 Emirati soldiers killed 90+ killed (per Houthis, 15 & 28 June); 22 killed (per Coalition & medical sources, 9–13 Sep.); 126 killed (17 Sudanese, per medical sources, 1–12 Nov.)	156 killed (per medical sources, airport battle, by 21 June); 250 killed (per Coalition, 13 June); 148 killed (per medical sources, 9–16 Sep.); 70 killed (per Coalition, 17 Oct.); 479 killed (per medical sources, 1–12 Nov.)
- 348 combatants killed (per medical sources, by 21 June); 170 combatants killed (per medical sources, 9–16 Sep.); 600 combatants killed (per medical sources, 1–12 Nov.); 616 civilians killed (1 Aug.–15 Oct., 1–12 Nov.)
- Location within Yemen

The siege of Hodeidah, also called Hudaydah or al-Hudaydah, (Arabic: معركة الحديدة, romanized: Ma‘rakat al-Ḥudaydah), codenamed Operation Golden Victory, was a major Saudi-led coalition assault on the port city of Hodeidah in Yemen. It was spearheaded by the United Arab Emirates and Saudi Arabia and was considered the largest battle since the start of the Saudi Arabian-led intervention in Yemen in 2015.

Beginning on 13 June 2018 and aiming to dislodge Houthi forces from the port, the objective of the assault was to recapture the city of Hodeidah and end the alleged supply of funds, weapons, and ballistic missiles to the Houthis through Hodeidah port. The Houthis countered by saying that they were defending Yemen from an American backed invasion.

As the port plays the crucial role of delivering over 80 percent of food and aid to Yemen, several humanitarian agencies warned of catastrophic humanitarian consequences. The United Nations warned that the battle could threaten the lives of 300,000 children in the populated area and prevent food delivery to millions or more. The UN has made various attempts and efforts to take over the control of Hodeidah port from Houthis and move it under its jurisdiction. The Houthis has said they are not against UN role and agreed to grant the UN "a role of supervision" on the condition the coalition withdraw from the offensive but said they won't withdraw from the city. Amid international pressure, the coalition promised the strategy of not entering any populated areas of Hodeidah, but work to isolate the Houthis by cutting their supply lines. Multiple reports indicate that the battle has exacerbated the humanitarian situation in Yemen.

A UN-backed ceasefire agreement between the Hadi-led government and the Houthis was officially declared in December 2018 in Sweden with terms of troop withdrawal of both warring parties from Hodeidah. The deal was never fully implemented, with Hadi-led forces accusing the Houthis of repeated ceasefire violations, and Houthi forces refusing to withdraw in 2019.

Pro-government forces eventually withdrew from the city in 2021, ceding control of Hodeidah to the Houthis.

== Background ==
The United Arab Emirates Armed Forces had previously proposed a naval attack on Hodeidah in 2016 to deprive the Houthis of getting resources from the port, however the United States advised against it as the operation was deemed to be too risky at that time. In the intervening two years, the UAE trained thousands of Yemeni soldiers, positioning them at bases in Eritrea and along Tihamah as part of the offensive on Hodeidah Governorate. According to the UAE, the dislodging of Houthis from Al Hudaydah will deprive the Houthis of their financial strength and force them to the negotiation table as well as stop the diverting of humanitarian aid to the Houthis and ensure it reached all Yemeni territories. The UAE gave the UN a deadline to negotiate with the Houthis to withdraw from the port city peacefully by midnight 12 June 2018 to avoid a military confrontation.

=== Geographical location ===
Hodeidah, is a port city in Yemen located in Hodeidah governorate in the western coastline of Yemen. The city is located on the Tihāmah coastal plain which borders the Red Sea. Hodeidah is the largest city by population in Hodeidah Governorate. Due to its location, Hudaydah port is one of the important and strategic ports in Yemen.

=== Humanitarian situation ===
The Yemeni Civil war is an ongoing conflict that began in 2015, closely followed by a Saudi Arabian-led military intervention. The war and blockade by the coalition has led to what the United Nations describes as the "world's worst humanitarian disaster". The port city of Hodeidah has played a crucial role in delivering imported food into the country. This role has been disrupted several times over the course of the war.

During the 2015 Yemeni Civil War, the Houthi-controlled city's port was bombed by the Saudi-led coalition on 18 August. The port's four cranes were destroyed and several warehouses were damaged. The coalition asserted that the port was housing a hostile naval base, but humanitarian aid organizations stated the coalition's naval blockade was preventing relief from reaching those in need.

In early November 2017, in response to a Houthi missile landing in Saudi Arabia, the Saudi authorities closed the port along with all other routes into Yemen. On 23 November 2017, the authorities allowed the port to reopen for aid deliveries, along with the Sanaa International Airport. According to World Health Organization, Hudaida governorate has one of the highest malnutrition rates in the country.

=== UN attempt at political solution ===
Prior to the beginning of the battle, three-quarters of humanitarian and commercial cargo entering Yemen arrived via the port of Hodeidah. Due to the risk of a humanitarian crisis if the port is besieged, the United Nations attempted to secure an agreement to manage the port under its jurisdiction and negotiated with the Houthis to take control of the port. The Houthis claiming that they have been cooperating with the international relief efforts to deliver aid to the Yemeni people. The coalition claims that Houthis use the port to raise war economy funds through taxation and smuggling weapons into Yemen, an allegation denied by the Houthis. A week before the start of the battle, the United Nations warned up to 250,000 of the city's 600,000 residents could be in danger. Martin Griffiths, UN peace envoy warned that the assault on Hodeidah would undermine the peace process. UNICEF Executive Director, Henrietta Fore, stated on 11 June that she was "extremely concerned" about reports of a military plan by Arab coalition to capture Hudaida. UN Secretary-General António Guterres, also said that he believed "intense negotiations" by UN representative can prevent start of a war.

==== Criticism by Houthis ====
In a tweet on 15 June, Mohammed Ali al-Houthi, the head of the Yemeni Supreme Revolutionary Committee criticized UN envoy Martin Griffith for failing to negotiate a peace deal, saying: "the role played by the former UN envoy did not exceed the profession of postman, and his initiative was rejected by the US-Saudi aggression in agreement with the mercenaries who refuse to accept the choice of a consensual person for the presidency."

Muhammad Abdel Salam, the Houthi spokesman also stated: "Despite the UN envoy's visit to Sanaa more than once and meeting with Houthi officials for a comprehensive political solution, he has not done anything yet, which appears as a cover for the continuation of aggression."

== Prelude ==
In a statement, UNICEF Executive Director Henrietta H. Fore said the battle will harm 300,000 children who currently live in and around the city. "There are 11 million children in need of humanitarian aid and the attack will lead to choke off this lifeline and have devastating consequences", the statement said. The United Arab Emirates initially stated that it would not attack the port without the support of the United States and the United Kingdom. The United States Government initially expressed concerns about the risks of a battle, though Secretary of State Mike Pompeo and Secretary of Defense James Mattis subsequently offered qualified support.

According to Emirati Minister of State for Foreign Affairs Anwar Gargash, the Houthis were warned to evacuate the city within 48 hour and the deadline for Houthi forces to withdraw from Hodeidah expired on the morning of 13 June. The Houthis say that they took power through a popular revolt and are defending Yemen from invasion.

Care International's acting country director, Jolien Veldwijk, warned from Sanaa of an even worse human catastrophe. "People are already exhausted, starving, and have no means to cope with any further escalation of war." Mohammed Ali al-Houthi, the head of the Yemeni Supreme Revolutionary Committee, called on all international organizations to take a serious stance on the aggression and the unprecedented threat it poses to the vital port of Hodeidah, reiterating its continued full cooperation with the international relief efforts to deliver aid to all the Yemeni people.

=== Western support ===
United States and other western powers have been criticized by human rights group for supporting Arab coalition airstrikes that have resulted in death of many civilians.

France agreed to use minesweepers to clear explosive and sea mines which were placed by the Houthis around Hodeidah Port in anticipation of the attack, hence paving a way for the assault. France also sent special forces.

Houthis have routinely accused Israel of being involved in the war against Yemen. On 2 June, Houthi spokesman, Muhammad Abd al-Salam said they have documented participation of Israeli planes in the war. He stated that the reason Israel does not acknowledge its role is that it does not want cause trouble for the Arab coalition.

== Battle timeline ==
=== First phase ===
==== June: Initial advances ====
The coalition intended the battle to be short to avoid causing civilian casualties. The aim was to cut off Houthis supplies and force them to come to the negotiation table. Coalition forces have established a forward operating base at the nearby town of al-Khoka, south of Al Hudaydah.

13 June

According to Yemeni officials, approximately 2,000 Emirati troops assaulted Hodeidah, departing from a UAE naval base in Eritrea. A worker for CARE reported hearing at least 30 airstrikes on the first day of fighting as the city population was caught in a panic. On the first day of the battle, Emirati and coalition forces reportedly moved to capture Hodeida International Airport, approaching within a few miles.

On the first day of fighting, 250 Houthi combatants were also reported killed.

Almasirah and Houthi spokesman Loai al-Shami claimed that Houthi forces hit a coalition ship with two missiles, though this remains unconfirmed. The Armed Forces of the UAE has reported that four Emirati soldiers died as of 13 June.

In an official statement the Houthi-allied Yemeni Marine and Coastal Defense Command expressed its high readiness to counter the offensive on the port, warning of more attacks on the invading naval forces. It also added that there is no concern for civilian ships to reach for Hodeidah so long as they stayed committed to international maritime law. It also stressed the Yemeni naval forces' national and religious responsibility in defending Yemen's sovereignty and territorial integrity.

14 June

Forces loyal to the internationally recognized Yemeni government claimed on 14 June that they could breach the first line of defence by Houthis defending the city. Medical sources reported that thirty Houthi militants were killed near Hodeida airport along with another nine pro-Hadi soldiers. According to Emirati Ambassador to the United Nations Obeid Salem Al Zaabi, coalition forces reached just 2 km from the city airport.

Two Houthi commanders were reported to have been killed in the ensuing battle, and the coalition claims to have discovered "hundreds" of land mines planted by the Houthis to halt the advance of Pro-Hadi and coalition soldiers in Hodeidah.

15 June

The United Arab Emirates issued 10 ships and 3 flights carrying food and aid bound to Hodeidah.

Yemeni army officials claimed that dozens of its members have been killed mostly by Houthi landmines and roadside bombs planted around the city and disguised as rocks.

Houthi official media, Almasirah, claimed death and injury of more than 40 coalition soldiers close to the seashore after being hit by a Houthi Tochka missile which was launched after intelligence gathering by a reconnaissance aircraft.

16 June

The coalition claimed it was close to capturing Hodeidah airport from Houthi control amid clashes outside the airport. The coalition reportedly seized the airport on 16 June and engineers were placed to remove landmines placed around the airport.

Houthis media denied that the airport was under coalition control and claimed that the coalition forces in the seashore were surrounded from three sides blocking reinforcements from reaching them by land.

Almasirah, a Houthi media outlet, claimed killing over 40 pro Hadi soldiers by Houthi snipers over the last two days in various fronts.

17 June

According to The National, captured Houthi POW have indicated that Houthi forced intended to blow up Hodeida International Airport terminals if coalition forces continued their assault to capture it and has planted thousand landmines across the area. Commander of the coalition forces, Tareq Saleh, has indicated that many of captured Houthis were forced to fight in Hodeidah, many of whom were coerced into fighting with threats made against their family members if they refused.

19 June

Houthis claimed to have fired a missile at the Saudi Aramco oil facilities in 'Asir in southwestern Saudi Arabia.

Multiple news agencies reported that the coalition captured large areas of Hodeidah airport. However Almasirah, pro-Houthi news agency, wrote that numerous attempts by the coalition to take over the airport failed despite mobilization of all the coalition soldiers. Almasirah also reported destruction of all buildings inside the Hodeidah airport as a result of coalition's heavy aerial bombings and claimed several "heroic" victories by the pro-Houthi army, citing their advance preparations and intelligence work before the start of the war for their success and citing the destruction of 20 coalition armored vehicles and capture of another 10.

Almasirah also reported death of 6 Yemeni civilians including 4 women as a result of coalition on aerial bombings on Hodeidah. A claim that was denied by coalition Colonel Turki Al-Malki citing that there were no civilian casualties on the coalition advance on the airport. The coalition accused pro-Houthi militants of breaking international law and placing tanks inside residential areas of Hodeidah.

20 June

Almasirah reported a public statement by a pro-Houthi organization called Southern National Front to Resist the Invasion which protested against recruitment of young southern Yemenis by the UAE to fight against the Houthis, calling on the southern tribes to prevent their children from being sent to fight the Houthis.

Saudi Arabia announced that Yemeni forces captured the airport from Houthi forces, which was again denied by Almasirah.

22 June

Reports regarding shortage of electricity and water for Hodeidah residents continue to rise, and relief workers attribute the water shortage due to damaged pipes caused by Houthi trench digging.

Almasirah released video of Houthi forces destroying coalition armored vehicles south of Hodeidah airport.

=== Offensive pause and attempt for Geneva peace talks ===
On 23 June, the United Arab Emirates announced a pause to the military operations and the advance on Hodeidah to allow for UN-brokered talks spearheaded by UN envoy to Yemen, Martin Griffiths. A UN peace talk between Yemeni president Hadi and a Houthi delegation was organized to occur in Geneva on 6 September with aims of finding a peaceful resolution on the battle.

==== Continued clashes on outskirts ====
On 4 August, a coalition airstrike was reported to have killed 30 people in a strike conducted near a hospital and Hodeidah fish market, the coalition denied the news source.

On 23 August, the coalition stated that it foiled a booby-trapped boat attack by Houthis in the Red Sea and blamed the Houthis of bombing the bordering village Al Ghalifqa in Al Duraihmi district with an Iranian-made ballistic missile.

On 31 August, according to Houthi-run al-Masirah television network report, a Saudi Arabian airstrike attacked three fishing boats in Yemen's western coastline of Hodeidah city, near the island of Uqban. Based on initial reports, 70 fishermen were missed with later reports mentioning the missing of 19 fishermen.

==== Collapse of peace talks ====
On 9 September, the peace talk collapsed after Houthis failed to show for 3 consecutive days to start Geneva peace talks on 6 September. The Houthis demanded that the UN transfer their wounded to outside Yemen for treatment as a condition to attend the peace talks and stated that the coalition has hindered their departure to Geneva by controlling Yemen's airspace.

=== Second phase ===
==== September–October: Supply lines ====
After the attempted peace talks between Hadi government and Al Houthis collapsed on 9 September, heavy clashes occurred between Pro Hadi and Houthis with local hospital sources claiming 11 pro-Hadi soldiers and 73 Houthi rebels to have been killed.

11 September

Pro-Hadi forces advanced on Hodeidah and seized control of key Houthi supply routes from Hodeidah to Sanaa, Kilo 10 and Kilo 16. A Houthi supply commander, Abu Hashem, was also reportedly killed in the advance. Houthis denied losing control of kilo 10 and kilo 16 supply routes, stating that the advance on the routes was foiled.

14 September

Pro-Hadi forces advanced and captured Hodeidah University with reports of continued clashes between pro-Hadi and Houthi forces occurring south of the city.

24 October

One Saudi-led coalition airstrike hit a busy vegetable market in the town of Bayt el-Faqih south of the Hodeida city, killed 19 civilians including two children.

=== Third phase ===
1 November

On the first of November, the coalition deployed approximately 10,000 additional reinforcements to take part in a new offensive in Hodeidah.

3 November

Over 200 airstrikes were reported around the Hodeidaharea, along with intense fighting around the airport and the University of Hodeidah.

4 November

Geert Cappelaere, UNICEF regional coordinator, described Yemen as "a living hell for children... a living hell for every single boy and girl" citing death of one child every 10 minutes. He further added that "with any assault on Hodedia, we not only fear for the lives of the thousands of children in Hodedia, we also fear for the impact on children and population, particularly those living in the northern part of the country."

6 November

A Save the Children heath facility was damaged in the fighting. UNICEF reported that fighting had reached "dangerously close" to the Al Thawra hospital. Houthi fighters raided the 22 May Hospital, which they used as a sniper position.

9 November

Houthis state that the coalition progress is limited. Fighting has been concentrated on and around 22 May Hospital in Hodeidah which was targeted by coalitions airstrikes and shelling according to the Houthis. Almasirah reported the coalition targeted the 22 May hospital with multiple airstrikes, damaging the hospital.

10 November

Pro Hadi Yemeni forces capture 22 May Hospital and faculty of engineering building of Hodeidah University. Houthi forces also captured several Sudanese soldiers, prompting Houthi spokesman Mohammed Abdulsalam to urge the Government of Sudan to withdraw the troops.

Houthi Information Minister Abdul Salam Ali Jaber defected to Saudi Arabia, stating during a press conference that he was "forced to work with the coup-led government". During the conference, an unidentified reporter threw a shoe at him and expressed anger at him on behalf of Yemenis for allying with the Houthis and Iranians.

14 November

Saudi led forces were ordered by the coalition to temporarily halt their offensive against Houthi forces.

One airstrike hit a bus outside of the city limits of Hodeidah, killing 7 civilians. Two shells also hit the al-Thawra Hospital, which is the city's only remaining medical facility.

19 November

Street fighting resumed on 19 November, with gunfights around the city center of Hodeidah and the al-Saleh district. Rebels also claimed to have fired a ballistic missile into Saudi Arabia.

The Saudi-led coalition reportedly conducted 10 airstrikes, and one missile was launched at the 7 July District.

20 November

Fighting continued in the al-Saleh district and along Khamsin Street in the center of Hodeidah.

The Houthi-run Almasirah TV channel claimed Houthi forces attacked government forces on the road between Hodeidah and Sanaa.

Millions of Yemenis organized by the Houthis, gather in several Yemeni cities, including Hudaida, to commemorate the anniversary of the birth of the Islamic prophet Muhammad and display national solidarity against the Saudi-US-led aggression. Addressing the crowds via televised speech, Ansar Allah leader, Abdul Malik Al Houthi said that the unjust aggression is attacking the identity, dignity and sovereignty of Yemen and that the people of Yemen reserve the right to self-defense.

23 November

UN Envoy for Yemen Martin Griffiths arrived in Hodeidah to hold negotiations with Houthi rebels.

26 November

According to pro-Houthi Saba News Agency, displaced citizens of Hodeidah held a rally in Al Mahwit to protest the Saudi-led attacks on Yemen.

27 November

Saba News Agency reported several aerial attacks and artillery shells by coalition against residential areas in Hodeidah. It also reported the downing of two coalition UAVs by a Houthi-allied wing of the Yemeni army. SABA also reported that Houthi fighters had repelled coalition "mercenaries" around Kilo 16.

3 December

A flight chartered by the United Nations evacuated 50 wounded Houthi fighters to Muscat, Oman for medical treatment, as part of the peace talks.

=== Offensive pause and Stockholm ceasefire agreement ===
Map showing the situation in Hodeidah city as of 17 April 2021

A UN-brokered ceasefire was agreed upon on 13 December 2018, giving both parties 21 days to fully withdraw their troops from the city. A flight chartered by the United Nations evacuated 50 wounded Houthi fighters to Muscat, Oman for medical treatment, as part of the peace talks.

In an interview with Al Akhbar on 27 December, the spokesman for Houthi-aligned forces stated that the coalition has violated the ceasefire several times since its start in 13 December. He also said they have evidence that the coalition is transferring Al-Qaeda and ISIS terrorists from Syria to use them as their proxies in their war against the Houthis as part of a two million-dollar agreement with the terrorists.

==== Stockholm agreement ====
Through UN lead effort, officials from both the Houthi Yemeni government and internationally recognized Yemeni government agreed to meet in Stockholm, Sweden to agree on peace terms regarding the battle of Hodeidah. The Agreement constituted three parts.

- A ceasefire in the city of Hodeidah and the ports of Hodeidah, As-Salif, and Ras Issa, as well as withdrawal and redeployment of both warring forces.
- An opening of humanitarian corridors for the movement of aid via these ports to impoverished areas of Yemen
- A prisoner swap between warring factions aiming to release more than 15,000 prisoners and detainees.

The agreement was spearheaded by the UN amid increasing concerns of humanitarian disaster in Yemen. Hodeidah is seen as the major port that facilitates the delivery of humanitarian aid to the rest of Yemen. The UN brokered ceasefire was organized by UN special envoy to Yemen Martin Griffiths, while the main two officials representing the warring factions were Mohamed Abdel Salam, the Houthi spokesman, and Khaled al-Yamani, the Foreign Minister of the Internationally recognized Yemeni government. The agreement was hailed as a major step towards a peace process in Yemen, and the Saudi-led coalition welcomed the agreement. However, the agreement was never fully implemented, and no detailed arrangement for the withdrawal of forces was made, leading to an impasse. Houthi forces refused to withdraw from Hodeidah in 2019, and Hadi's forces have accused the Houthis of repeatedly violating the ceasefire around Hodeidah.

==== UN Mission to Support the Hodeidah Agreement ====
In January 2019, the UN Mission to Support the Hodeidah Agreement began.

==== Houthi takeover ====
In November 2021, Houthi forces completely occupied Hodeidah after the withdrawal of Yemeni government forces from the city.

== Effect on maritime traffic and threats of strait closure ==
On 26 July, Saudi Arabia confirmed that Houthis hit a Saudi oil tanker off the western coast. Saudi energy minister announced on 26 July that the country temporarily ceases oil shipment through Bab-el-Mandeb straight after two Saudi vessels were hit by the Houthi movement. The decision led to increase in oil prices. The Houthi officials had earlier threatened that they would block the vital strait to force the coalition to stop its air strikes on Yemen. Mohammed al-Houthi said that they are able to reach high seas and Saudi ports but they want to keep the strait open in order not to give the coalition an excuse to justify their ongoing war.

=== Houthi's retaliation ===
On 27 July, Muhammed Abdel Salam, a senior Houthi spokesman warned that the coalition's cities would be targeted in response to their offense on Hodeidah stating: "From now on, the capitals of the Arab coalition members will no longer be safe". This followed Houthi's claim that they had targeted UAE international airport in Abu Dhabi, which was denied by UAE authorities. On 27 July, in response to the Houthi attack against two Saudi Arabia's oil tankers, the Saudi-led coalition intensified airstrikes on Houthi-controlled areas in Hodeidah, reportedly the airstrikes targeted military police headquarters and other bases controlled by the Houthi fighters in Hodeidah, causing damage to the city's infrastructure. As a result, dozens of families were forced to flee their homes following the intensive airstrikes. Houthis stated they would stop missile strikes at Saudi Arabia if Saudi-led coalition stopped their airstrikes against them.

== Continued UN attempt for political solution ==
On 16 June, Martin Griffiths, the UN special envoy to Yemen, traveled to the Houthi-held capital Sanaa to persuade the Houthis to give up control of Hodeidah port amid growing fears that the battle will cut the only lifeline to the country's population. On 26 June, Martin Griffiths traveled to Aden to persuade Hadi for a political solution and to avert an assault on the city. The Houthis reportedly had shown willingness to hand over control of Hodeidah port to the UN but both Hadi and the UAE insisted that the Houthis must relinquish control of the entire city.

On 30 June, the coalition spokesman announced a temporary pause of the offensive for progress of political dialogue. However, Houthi spokesman, Abdl al-Salam called the UAE's declaration of ceasefire "deception", saying that the assaults on the West coast has not stopped.

Houthis deputy prime minister, Hussein Maqbuli, discussed in Sana with the UN coordinator, Lise Grande the conditions of over 24,000 internally displaced families in Yemen who according to Maqbuli were intimidated and compelled by the coalition to evacuate their villages and towns.

On 30 January 2019, a UN de-mining team was fired on as they were trying to clear access to the Hodeidah grain silos, with both warring parties blaming each other for the incident.

== Impact on the humanitarian situation ==
Reuters reported on 16 June that the battle led to the closure of the northern entrance of the western city Hodeidah, which leads to Sanaa, blocking a main exit out of the city and making it harder to transport goods from the country's largest port to mountainous regions.

The pro-Hadi government minister of human rights denounced the Houthis tactics of planting sea and land mines around Hodeidah port.

Houthi deputy prime minister claimed that the coalition has forced over 24000 families to evacuate their towns and villages.

The battle forced about 2000 high-school students in Hodeidah to escape to Sanaa to take part in university admission exams, which was organized by the Houthis to alleviate social frustrations.

UNICEF and UN Humanitarian Coordinator, stated that the coalition airstrikes on infrastructure and Houthi trench digging tactics which disrupt water pipes have put the lives of innocent civilians at risk and are undermining UN efforts to prevent further escalation of the humanitarian disaster, warning of a possibility of an uncontrollable cholera epidemic.

On 29 July, UN Humanitarian Coordinator, Lise Grande, also issued a statement in response to a 23 July Saudi airstrike on a water facility in Hodaida saying that the recent airstrikes are putting innocent civilians at extreme risk. The statement read "despite working under some of the most difficult conditions imaginable, we’ve reached 80 percent of the people displaced by fighting with some form of assistance. Cholera is already present in neighborhoods across the city and governorate. Damage to sanitation, water and health facilities jeopardizes everything we are trying to do. We could be one airstrike away from an unstoppable epidemic."

CARE International warned that Yemeni food supplies might run out in two or three months if the Hodaida port is sealed off or put out of action.

On 7 November, Amnesty International stated that Houthi troops took up sniper position on top of 22 May hospital, violating international law and placing civilians inside in danger.

On 26 January 2019 a fire caused by mortar shelling damaged two wheat silos in Hodeidah at the Red Sea Mills grains facility, which holds 51,000 tonnes of World Food Programme (WFP) wheat. Both warring parties blamed each other for the fire. The Red Sea Mills was previously reported to be in pro-coalition held territory during coalition forces advances prior to the ceasefire.

== Reactions ==
- (Yemen) Supreme Political Council

Houthi leader Mohammed Ali al-Houthi blamed the assault on Western inaction, saying that the British assured them a week earlier that no coalition troops would attack Hodeidah "without their agreement and assistance". Houthi spokesman Abdul Salem also stated that aggression in the West Coast "lacks moral and social values, so the aggressors resort to media show off and psychological warfare".

Writing an op-ed in The Washington Post, Mohammed Ali al-Houthi, head of the Houthi-led Supreme Revolutionary Committee, stated the November escalation of war against Hudaida showed that US calls for peace were empty, misleading and only meant to save face after Khashoggi murder scandal, arguing that Trump administration is also interested in continuation of the war because of economic profits. He also said that the coalition is using famine and cholera as weapons of war and has undermined UN efforts for peace by threatening to cut its funding. He pointed to 2015 power-sharing deal by UN which was disrupted by the coalition airstrikes. He said that they would stop missile strikes at Saudi Arabia if Saudi-led coalition also stop their airstrikes against Yemen. "We love peace — the kind of honorable peace defended by our revolution’s leader, Abdulmalik al-Houthi. We are ready for peace, the peace of the brave. God willing, Yemenis will remain the callers of peace and lovers of peace," he said.

=== International reactions ===
- Iran

The Iranian Ministry of Foreign Affairs strongly condemned the operation, claiming it would cause a humanitarian disaster.

- Hezbollah

Hezbollah's Secretary General, Hassan Nasrallah, stated that Arabs must be fighting against Israel not Yemen. Alluding to the Saudi-led Operation Decisive Storm against Yemen, he stated "for decades there has been no ‘Decisive Storm,’ not even a slight gust of resolve to fight Israel." He accused Saudi Arabia of abandoning the Palestinian people and warned that KSA would face a humiliating defeat if it did not resolve the conflict through negotiations. In reference to governments taking part in the war against Yemen, he asked "should the region go to war because of Saudi money?"

- United Kingdom

On 13 June 2018, the United Kingdom requested an emergency session of the United Nations Security Council to discuss the battle. More than forty members of the Parliament of the United Kingdom have called on Prime Minister Theresa May to call for a ceasefire and to stop supplying weapons to coalition nations if necessary. The session concluded with a rejection and opposition to call for a ceasefire and the immediate withdrawal of the Saudi led forces, but has instead urged sides to uphold international humanitarian law during the battle.

- United States

Prior to the beginning of the fighting, members of the United States House of Representatives sent a letter to Secretary of Defense Mattis, urging the United States Department of Defense to attempt to prevent or delay the assault. The United States did not express opposition to the offense and has offered airstrike target assistance and qualified support, but noted increasing concerns regarding humanitarian consequences.

- United Nations:

UNICEF issued a warning that the attack could threaten the lives of 300,000 children in the populated area and prevent food delivery to as many as 250,000 of the 600,000 population of Al Hudaydah. However, the United Nations Security Council rejected a call for a ceasefire and the immediate withdrawal of the Saudi led forces, but has instead urged sides to uphold international humanitarian law during the battle.

== See also ==
- Battle of Aleppo (2012–2016)
- Battle of Benghazi (2014–2017)
- Battle of Aden (2015)
