= Badush prison massacre =

2014 massacre of Shia prisoners

- Part of Islamic State invasion of Iraq and Persecution of Shias by the Islamic State
- Location: 36.415278°N 42.971389°E; Badush, Iraq
- Date: 10 June 2014
- Target: Shia prisoners
- Attack type: Mass murder, mass shooting
- Deaths: 670–1,000+
- Perpetrator: Islamic State of Iraq and the Levant
- Defender: Iraq

On 10 June 2014, the Islamic State of Iraq and the Levant (ISIL) killed at least 670 Shia prisoners in an attack on Badush prison. ISIL first separated out the Sunni inmates before executing the remaining prisoners.

On 11 March 2017, the Popular Mobilization Forces announced that they had discovered a mass grave containing the remains of 500 prisoners executed by ISIL in the prison. There were 39 Indian construction workers who were executed in the region.

On 13 June 2021, it was reported that Iraqi authorities had removed the remains of 123 people murdered by ISIL during the prison attack from a mass grave to identify them using DNA from relatives.

== New international investigation and report ==
In September 2024, UNITAD (the United Nations Office for the Investigation of International Crimes) published a report on “international crimes” committed by the Islamic State of Iraq and the Levant (ISIL) against prisoners at Badush Central Prison. The report stated that approximately 1,000 male prisoners — mostly Shia but including some Sunnis, Yazidis and Christians — were executed at at least six different locations on the same day (June 10, 2014).

According to UNITAD and in collaboration with Iraqi civil society organizations — as of the time of this report — the remains of over 600 victims have been recovered and examined. This new finding suggests that the executions were likely more widespread than initially estimated (670 to 1,000+) — and also highlights the possibility of “genocidal intent.” This section can be added to the lead of the article or to a separate section such as “Investigations & International findings.”

== Mass-grave discovery and victim identification process (2017 to 2025) ==
In March 2017, the Popular Mobilization Forces (PMF) announced that they had found a mass grave containing the remains of approximately 500 executed prisoners near Badush Prison. On June 13, 2021, Iraqi authorities announced that the remains of 123 victims had been removed from that mass grave to be identified through DNA testing. In 2025, Iraqi forensic offices reported that the remains of 28 persons (part of the victims) had been returned to their families. It was also reported in July 2025 that the remains of 20 more victims had been returned to their families after genetic matching; this is the fourth series of victims' returns, and so far 171 identified bodies have been returned to families.

== Witness accounts and manner of killings in detail ==
According to Human Rights Watch (HRW), during the prison attack: Sunni and Christian prisoners (and perhaps other minorities) were separated and driven away — but the predominantly Shiite prisoners (and some minorities) were forced to stand in a line along the side of a ravine and then shot with automatic weapons One survivor described: “They told everyone to raise their hand and say their number… I was number 43; after 615 people, someone started shooting…” It is said that some of the bodies were burned after the murder.

== The range of victims ==
According to the UNITAD report, the victims also included men from the Yazidi, Christian and Sunni minorities. Some reports have also indicated that prisoners of other ethnicities/religions — not just Shiites — were among those killed.

== Significance ==
According to the UNITAD report, this attack was not only a war crime, but also carried out with "genocidal intent against the Shiites of Iraq."
