= Badush Dam =

Dam in Ninawa, Iraq

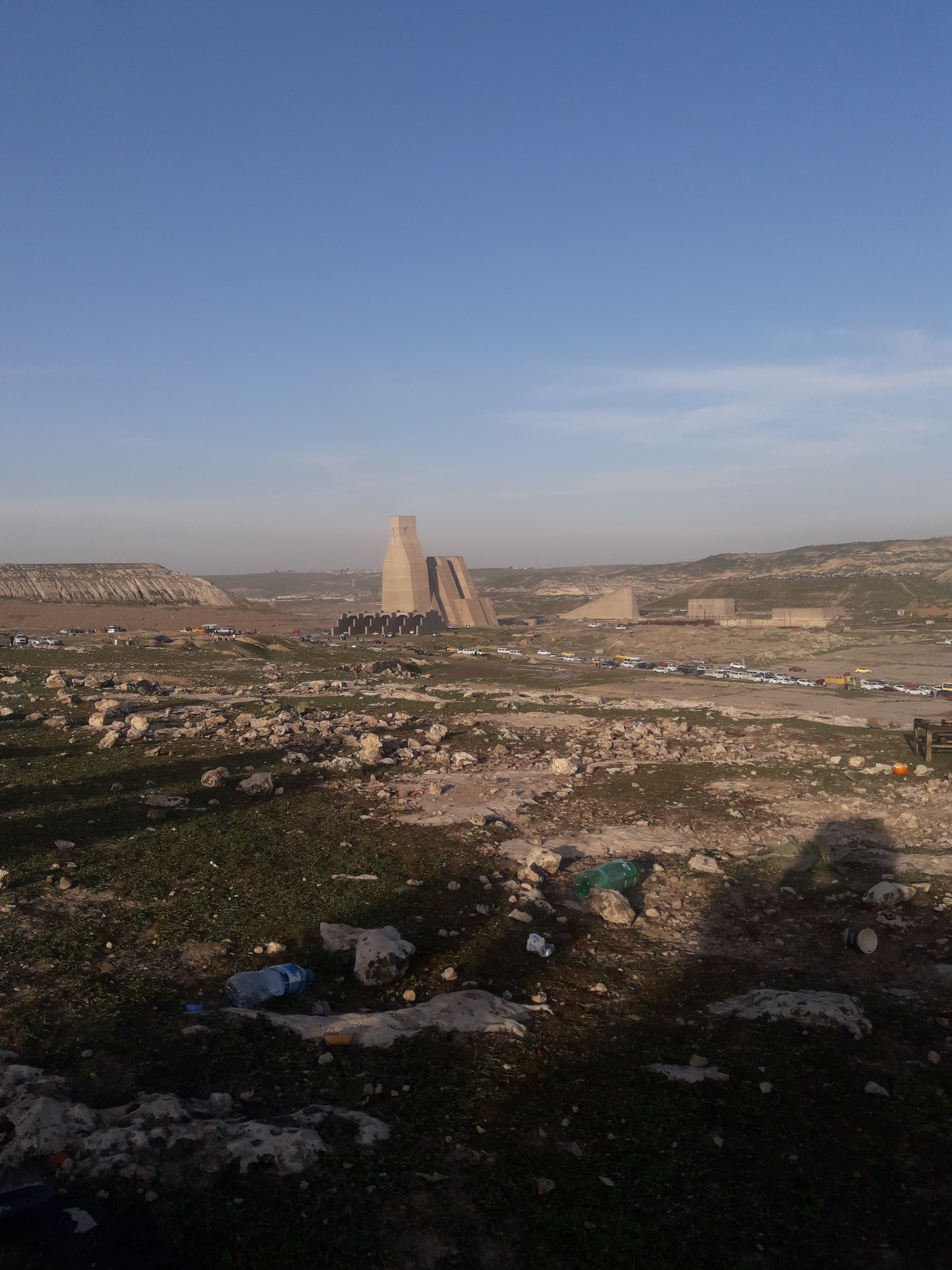

- Location within Iraq
- Interactive map of Badush Dam
- Location: Badush, Ninawa Governorate, Iraq
- Coordinates: 36°28′00″N 42°57′59″E
- Status: Unfinished
- Construction began: 1988; 38 years ago
- Operator: Ministry of Water Resources

Dam and spillways
- Type of dam: Gravity with earthen sections
- Impounds: Tigris River
- Height: 102 m (335 ft)
- Length: 3,730 m (12,240 ft)
- Dam volume: 6,100,000 m^{3} (8,000,000 cu yd)
- Spillway capacity: 4,000 m^{3}/s (140,000 cu ft/s)

Reservoir
- Total capacity: 10,000,000,000 m^{3} (8,100,000 acre⋅ft) @ 307 m (1,007 ft)
- Normal elevation: Normal: 245.5 m (805 ft); Flood: 307 m (1,007 ft)

Power Station
- Hydraulic head: 100 m (330 ft) (net)
- Turbines: 4 x 42.5 MW Kaplan-type
- Installed capacity: 170 MW

The Badush Dam is an unfinished multi-purpose dam on the Tigris River, located near Badush, 16 kilometres (9.9 mi) northwest of Mosul in the Ninawa Governorate, northern Iraq.

If completed, the dam's designed main purpose is to provide protection from a failure of the unstable Mosul Dam upstream. In addition, the hydroelectric power station would have an installed capacity of 170 MW and the dam would further regulate tailwaters from Mosul Dam.

== History ==
In response to concerns over Mosul Dam's karst foundation, Iraqi's Ministry of Irrigation began construction in 1988. Works on the dam ended in 1991 due to economic sanctions against Iraq. Other problems troubled construction as well, particularly lethal gas exhalation. Significant construction on the dam along with the hydro-power unit housing had occurred. The dam is roughly 40 percent complete.

== Current project ==
Concerns over the stability of the Mosul Dam significantly contributed to recent efforts to restart construction of the Badush Dam, and possibly expand it as well.

As early as December 2005, Iraq's Ministry of Water Resources was developing a project to restart construction on the dam. Currently, it would cost about US$300 million to complete the initial design but the Government of Iraq is wary of spending an additional US$10 billion to expand the dam's size in order to help mitigate a potential failure of the Mosul Dam.

The current project contains a main earth-fill dam with an inclined clay core and other random fills, two saddle dams (earth-fill dams) at the left bank and a 240-metre (790 ft) concrete dam (hollow buttress type) at the right bank. The concrete dam includes eight bottom outlets, a spillway and four power intakes and conduits, a stilling basin, headrace and tailrace channels. There is a power house, close to the concrete dam. The Badush Dam's spillway will have a maximum output of 4,000 cubic metres per second (140,000 cu ft/s); each hydro-power unit will have a capacity of 275 cubic metres per second (9,700 cu ft/s) for a total of 1,100 cubic metres per second (39,000 cu ft/s). The bottom outlets, power station and spillway combined afford a discharge capacity of 13,100 m^{3}/s (460,000 cu ft/s)

The normal reservoir level is 245.5 m (805 ft) above sea level and the maximum level is 307 m (1,007 ft). The 61.5 m (202 ft) allowance between the normal and maximum is for flood protection from a Mosul Dam collapse. At its maximum level the Badush reservoir can hold 10,000,000,000 m^{3} (8,100,000 acre⋅ft), enough to absorb and pass a Mosul Dam wave, according to a wave study.
