= Badush =

Badush بَادُوش
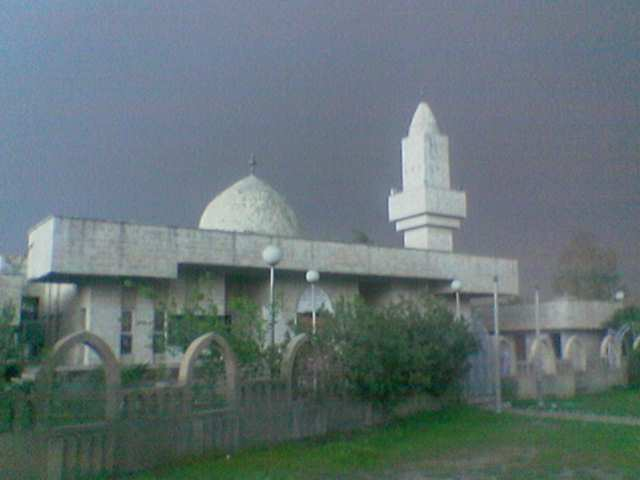
- Madinah al-Munawwarah Mosque at the Badush Dam Residential Complex.

- Location within Iraq
- Coordinates: 36°24′55.0″N 42°58′17.0″E
- Country: Iraq
- Governorate: Nineveh
- Municipality: Mosul District

Badush or Badosh (Arabic: بَادُوش, romanized: Bādūš) is a village in northern Iraq within the Nineveh Governorate, located northwest of Mosul.

== Region ==
There are some important facilities in the surrounding area:

- Badush Dam which is being built on the Tigris River, located north of the village.
- Badush cement plant, located to the northeast. In 2017 the cement plant has been the site of some fighting during the Battle of Mosul, as Iraqi forces clashed with ISIL. Lt. Col. Ali Jassem of the 9th Armoured Division stated that Iraqi forces had raided and entered the Badush cement plant to where some ISIL fighters had retreated to. The cement factory had previously been damaged by fire and looting by ISIL forces. The factory was the first cement plant in Iraq, established in 1955. The plant was one of the largest producers of cement in Iraq and originally had three production lines for cement capable of 6,300 metric tonnes per year.
- Prison of Badush, located to the southwest. The prison was the site of the Badush prison massacre in June 2014 when the Islamic State of Iraq and the Levant (ISIL) killed at least 670 prisoners.

== See also ==
- Badush prison massacre
