= Lise Grande =

American diplomat

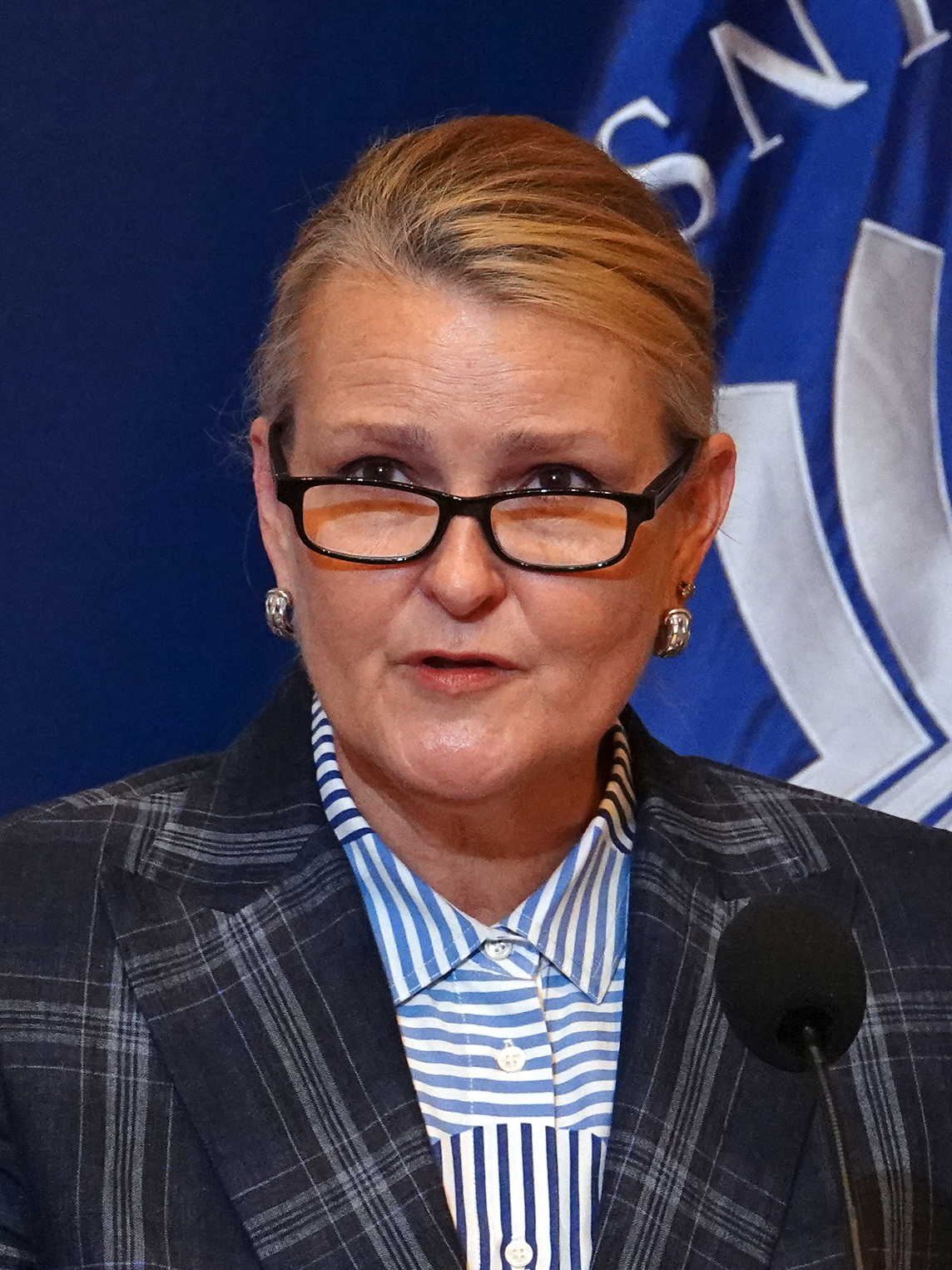

President of the United States Institute of Peace
- In office December 1, 2020 – April 24, 2024
- Succeeded by: George Moose

Personal details
- Education: Stanford University (BA); The New School (MA)

Lise Grande is an American who became the president of the United States Institute of Peace on December 1, 2020. She previously served abroad in several positions for the United Nations managing operations including in South Sudan, India, Iraq and Yemen.

== Education ==
Grande earned a bachelor's degree from Stanford University and a master's degree from The New School.

== Career ==
From 2008 to 2012, she worked with the United Nations in South Sudan and held was the deputy representative of the Secretary-General and Humanitarian Coordinator. From 2005 to 2008, she worked with the United Nations in the Republic of the Congo where she held the position of Head of the United Nations Integrated Office. From 2003 to 2005, she worked as the UNDP representative in Armenia.

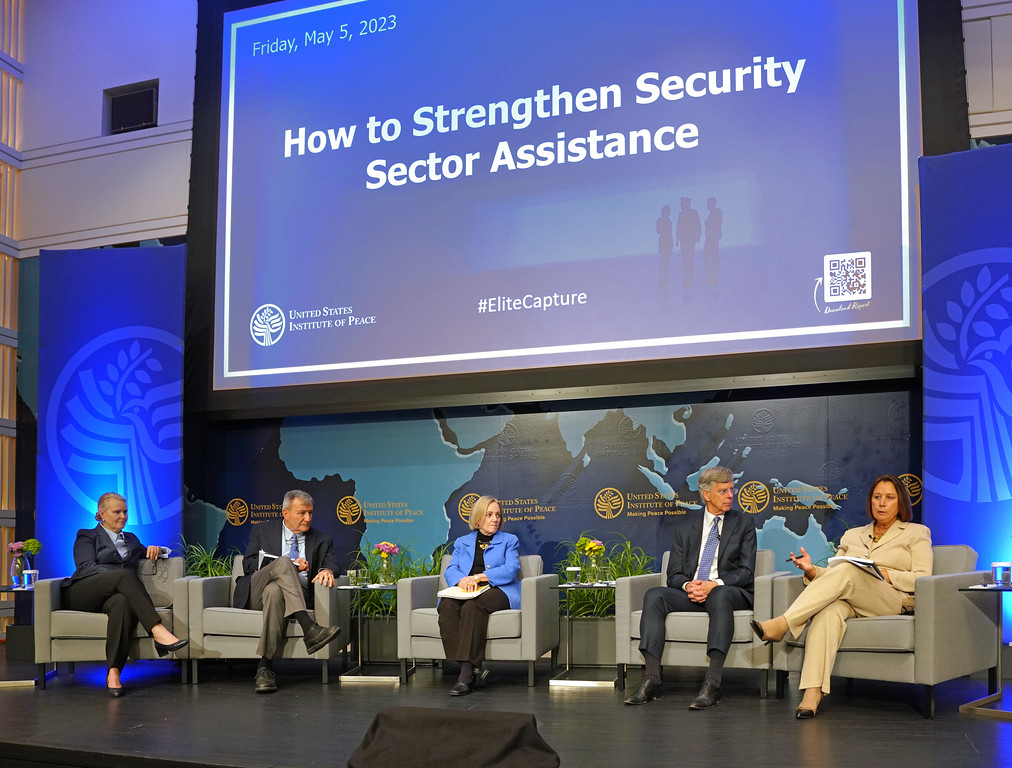
Grande at the US Institute for Peace in May 2023 duscussing how to "Strengthen Security Sector Assistance"

Grande was a deputy special representative of the United Nations Assistance Mission for Iraq. Grande was also the resident coordinator with the United Nations Development Programme (UNDP) in India.

Grande worked for the UN in Iraq where she managed one of the largest evacuations from a war zone during the war with ISIS.

Grande was the UN Resident Coordinator in Yemen. As Resident Coordinator in Yemen, she was the UN Humanitarian Coordinator (HC).

After 25 years of working abroad for the United Nations and her work in Yemen managing one of the largest UN operations she was appointed as the president and CEO of the federally funded United States Institute of Peace in December 2020. On April 24, 2024, Grande was appointed Special Envoy for Middle East Humanitarian Issues by President Joe Biden.
