= Iraqi Turkmens =

Third largest ethnic group in Iraq

Irak Türkmenleri
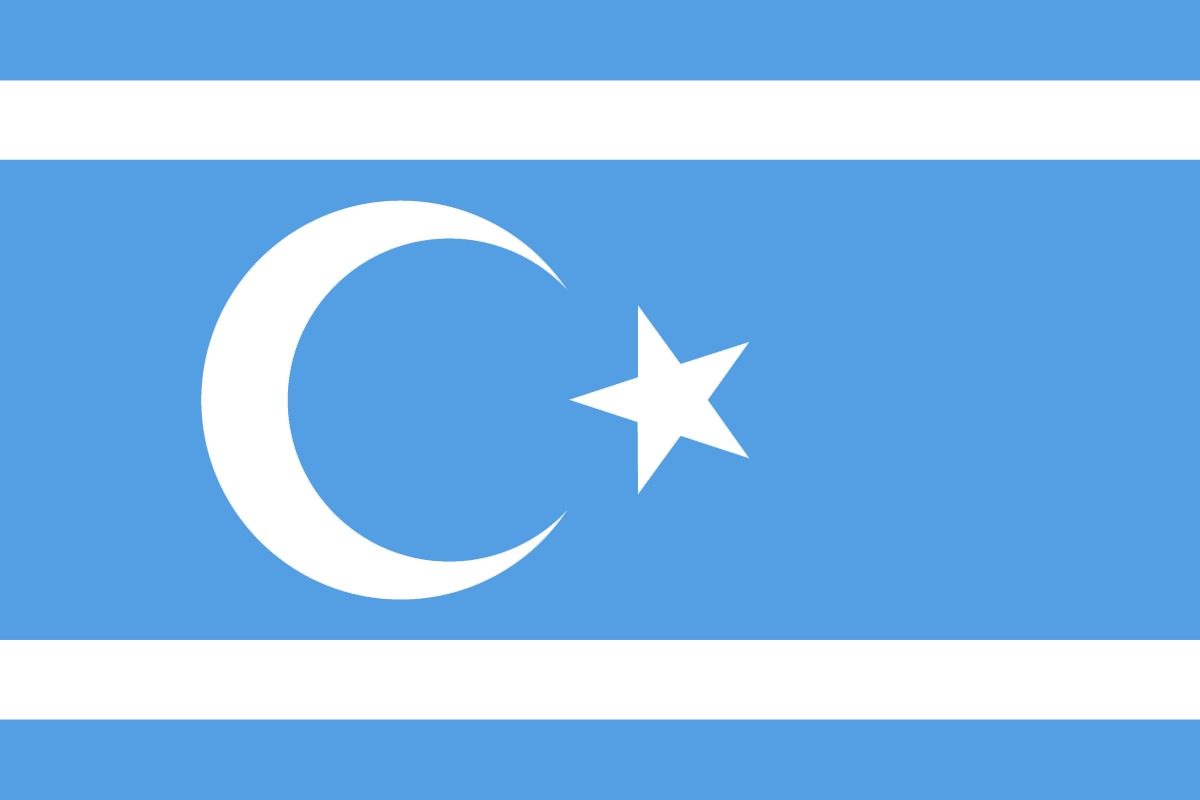
- Ethnic flag of the Iraqi Turkmens

Total population
- 3 million (2013 Iraqi Ministry of Planning estimate)

Regions with significant populations
- Northern Iraq, mainly governorates of Kirkuk, Nineveh, as well as presence in Erbil, Saladin and Diyala

Languages
- Turkmen dialect Additional: Kurdish, Istanbul Turkish

Religion
- 99% Islam (60–70% Sunni, 30–40% Shia, small Alevi minority); 1% Christianity (Catholic)

The Iraqi Turkmens (Turkish: Irak Türkmenleri, عراق تورکمنلری; Arabic: تركمان العراق), also referred to as Iraqi Turks, (Turkish: Irak Türkleri, عراق توركلری; Arabic: أتراك العراق) are the third largest ethnic group in Iraq. Their traditional homeland is in northern Iraq, mainly Kirkuk and Nineveh provinces, with Kirkuk considered by them as their capital. They have close cultural ties with Turkey, and are closely related to Syrian Turkmen. Iraqi Turkmens in Iraq do not identify with the traditionally-nomadic Turkmens of Central Asia.

== Ethnonyms ==
According to Iraqi Turkmen scholar Professor Suphi Saatçi, prior to the mid-20th century the Turkmens in Iraq were known simply as "Turks". It was not until after the military coup of 14 July 1958, that the ruling military junta officially introduced the name "Turkman/Turkmen":

the political goal of the Iraqi government was to distinguish the Iraqi Turkmens from other Turks in Anatolia, just as the Greek government used the name "Muslim minority" for those Turks living within the borders of Greece.

The state-imposed terms on the Turks of Iraq were not resisted, for the word "Turkmen" had historically been designated to the Oghuz Turks who had accepted Islam and migrated westwards from Central Asia to the Middle East, and had continued to be used in the region. Thus, Iraqi Turkmens (as well as Syrian Turkmens and Anatolian Turkmens) do not identify themselves with the Turkmen people of Turkmenistan. Rather, the term "Turkmen" in the Middle East is often used to designate Turkic-speakers, particularly in the Arab areas, or where Sunni Turks live in Shiite dominated areas.

Despite the modern usage of the term "Turkmen", Professor David Kushner has pointed out that the term "Turks" continues to be used in referring to the "Outside Turks" of the former Ottoman Empire, including the Turks in Iraq, which is in contrast to the terms used for other Turkic peoples who did not share this Ottoman history:

Generally one may distinguish between the 'closer' communities [to Turkey] of Turks in Cyprus, Greece, Bulgaria, and Iraq, on the one hand, and the more 'distant' ones in Iran, the Soviet Union and China, on the other...even the term "Turks" is selectively used. It is habitually used in reference to the 'closer' Turkish communities while the others are commonly referred to by their own particular names (i.e., Azeris, Turkestanis, etc.)... More important perhaps than the legal factor has been the historical and cultural identity of the Turks in Cyprus, Greece, Bulgaria and Iraq with the Turks of Turkey. Not only are these communities geographically adjacent to the Turks but they have all shared the Ottoman past, speak more or less the same language, and are predominantly Sunni.

They are also referred to as Turkish-Iraqis, the Turkish minority in Iraq, and the Iraqi-Turkish minority.

=== In literature ===
Professor Orit Bashkin has observed that within Iraqi Turkmen literature, poets have managed to "remain loyal to Iraq as a state" whilst they have also "concurrently upheld their Turkish distinctiveness":

For Mustafa Gökkaya (b. 1910), this signified that his community was Muslim and that "my father is Turk, and the homeland [is] my mother". For Reşit Ali Dakuklu (b. 1918), being part of "the Turks of Iraq" signified maintaining brotherly relations with every nation, being united with Iraq, while speaking in Turkish. Universal and local, Iraqi and Turkish at the same time, the Turkoman poets were willing to serve their nation yet unwilling to neglect their culture and their Turkishness.

== History ==
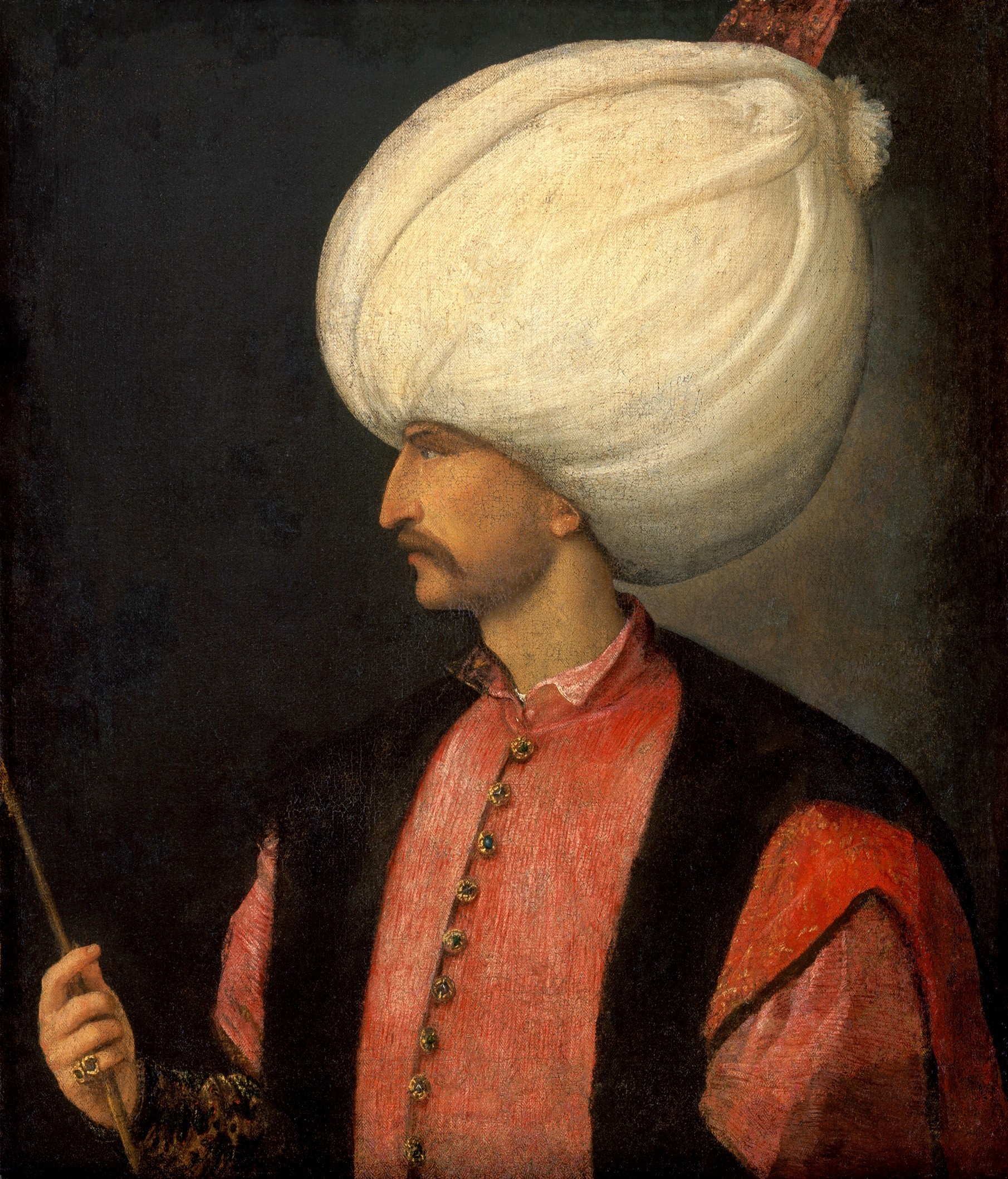
Suleiman the Magnificent defeated the Safavids on 31 December 1534, gaining Baghdad and, later, southern Iraq. Throughout the Ottoman reign, the Ottomans encouraged Turkish migration along northern Iraq.

=== Origin ===
The exact origin of Iraqi Turkmens is uncertain, but several possible explanations and theories of settlement in the region indicate that they likely originally emerged in Iraq as garrisons established by multiple rulers in various time periods.

Iraqi Turkmens are believed to be the descendants of various waves of Turkic settlement in Mesopotamia beginning from the 7th century until the end of Ottoman rule (1919). The first wave of migration dates back to the 7th century, followed by migrations during the Seljuk Empire (1037–1194), the fleeing Oghuz during the Mongol destruction of the Khwarazmian dynasty (see Kara Koyunlu and Ag Qoyunlu), and the largest migration, during the Ottoman Empire (1535–1919). With the conquest of Iraq by Suleiman the Magnificent in 1534, followed by Sultan Murad IV's capture of Baghdad in 1638, a large influx of Turks—predominantly from Anatolia—settled down in Iraq. It is believed that many of today's Iraqi Turkmens are the descendants of the Ottoman soldiers, traders and civil servants who were brought into Iraq during the rule of the Ottoman Empire.

=== Migration under Arab rule ===
The presence of Turkic peoples in what is today Iraq first began in the 7th century when approximately 2,000–5,000 Oghuz Turks were recruited in the Muslim armies of Ubayd-Allah ibn Ziyad. They arrived in 674 with the Umayyud conquest of Basra. More Turkic troops settled during the 8th century, from Bukhara to Basra and also Baghdad. During the subsequent Abbasid era, thousands more of Turkmen warriors were brought into Iraq; however, the number of Turkmens who had settled in Iraq were not significant, as a result, the first wave of Turkmens became assimilated into the local Arab population.

=== Seljuk migration ===
The second wave of Turkmens to descend on Iraq were the Turks of the Great Seljuq Empire. Large scale migration of Turkmens in Iraq occurred in 1055 with the invasion of Sultan Tuğrul Bey, the second ruler of the Seljuk dynasty, who intended to repair the holy road to Mecca. For the next 150 years, the Seljuk Turks placed large Turkmen communities along the most valuable routes of northern Iraq, especially Tal Afar, Erbil, Kirkuk, and Mandali, which is now identified by the modern community as Turkmeneli. Many of these settlers assumed positions of military and administrative responsibilities in the Seljuk Empire.

=== Ottoman migration ===
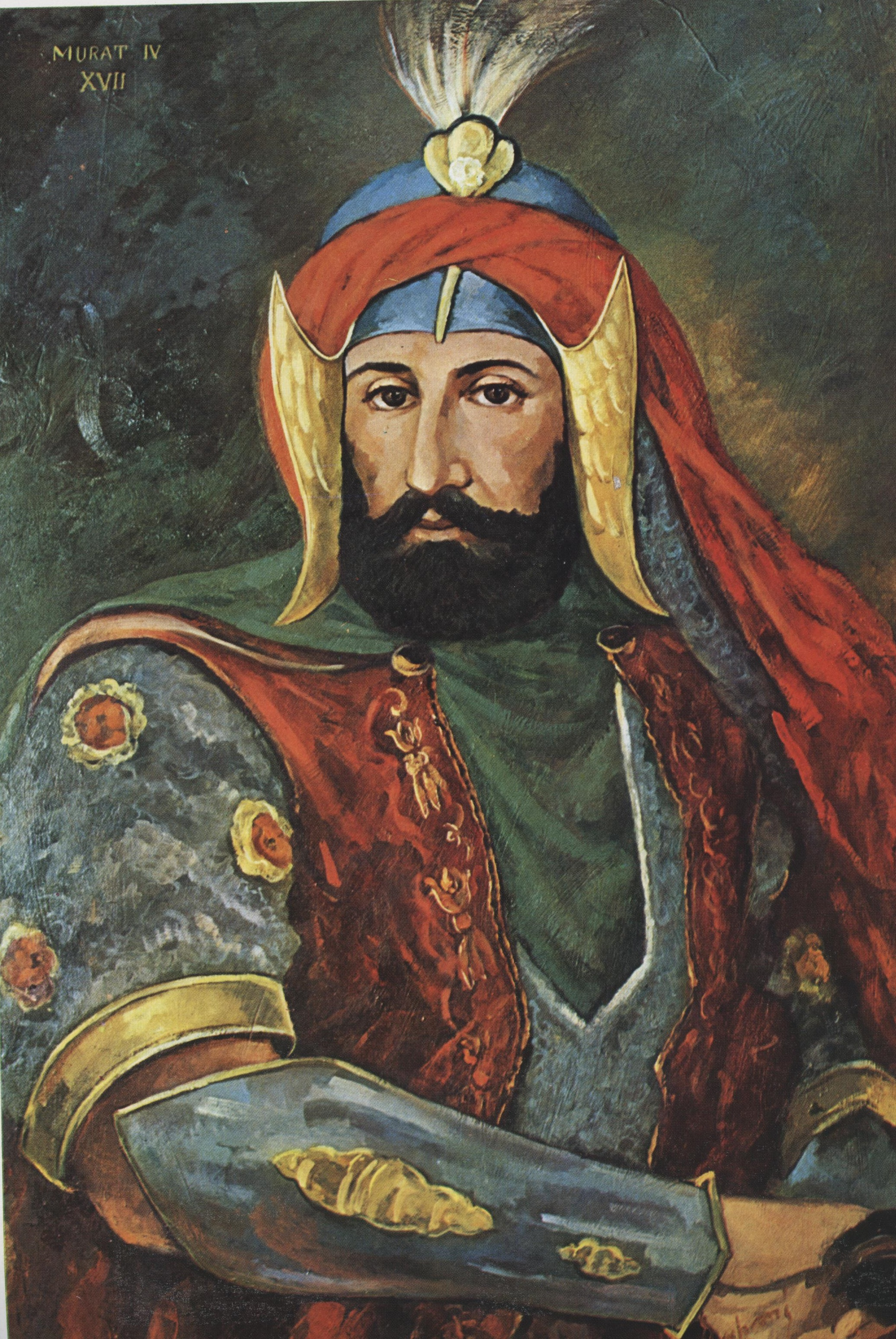
A large influx of Turks continued to settle in Iraq once Murad IV recaptured Baghdad in 1638.

The third, and largest, wave of Turkmen migration to Iraq arose during the four centuries of Ottoman rule (1535–1919). By the first half of the sixteenth century the Ottomans had begun their expansion into Iraq, waging wars against their arch rival, the Persian Safavids. In 1534, under the reign of Suleiman the Magnificent, Mosul was sufficiently secure within the Ottoman Empire and became the chief province (eyalet) responsible for all other administrative districts in the region. The Ottomans encouraged migration from Anatolia and the settlement of immigrant Turkmens along northern Iraq, religious scholars were also brought in to preach Hanafi (Sunni) Islam. With loyal Turkmens inhabiting the area, the Ottomans were able to maintain a safe route through to the southern provinces of Mesopotamia. Following the conquest, Kirkuk came firmly under Turkish control and was referred to as "Gökyurt", it is this period in history whereby modern Iraqi Turkmens claim association with Anatolia and the Turkish state.

The Mosul vilayet.

With the conquest of Iraq by Suleiman the Magnificent in 1534, followed by Sultan Murad IV's capture of Baghdad in 1638, a large influx of Turks settled down in the region. After defeating the Safavids on 31 December 1534, Suleiman entered Baghdad and set about reconstructing the physical infrastructure in the province and ordered the construction of a dam in Karbala and major water projects in and around the city's countryside. Once the new governor was appointed, the town was to be composed of 1,000 foot soldiers and another 1,000 cavalry. However, war broke out after 89 years of peace and the city was besieged and finally conquered by Abbas the Great in 1624. The Persians ruled the city until 1638 when a massive Ottoman force, led by Sultan Murad IV, recaptured the city. In 1639, the Treaty of Zuhab was signed that gave the Ottomans control over Iraq and ended the military conflict between the two empires. Thus, more Turks arrived with the army of Sultan Murad IV in 1638 following the capture of Baghdad whilst others came even later with other notable Ottoman figures.

=== Post-Ottoman era ===
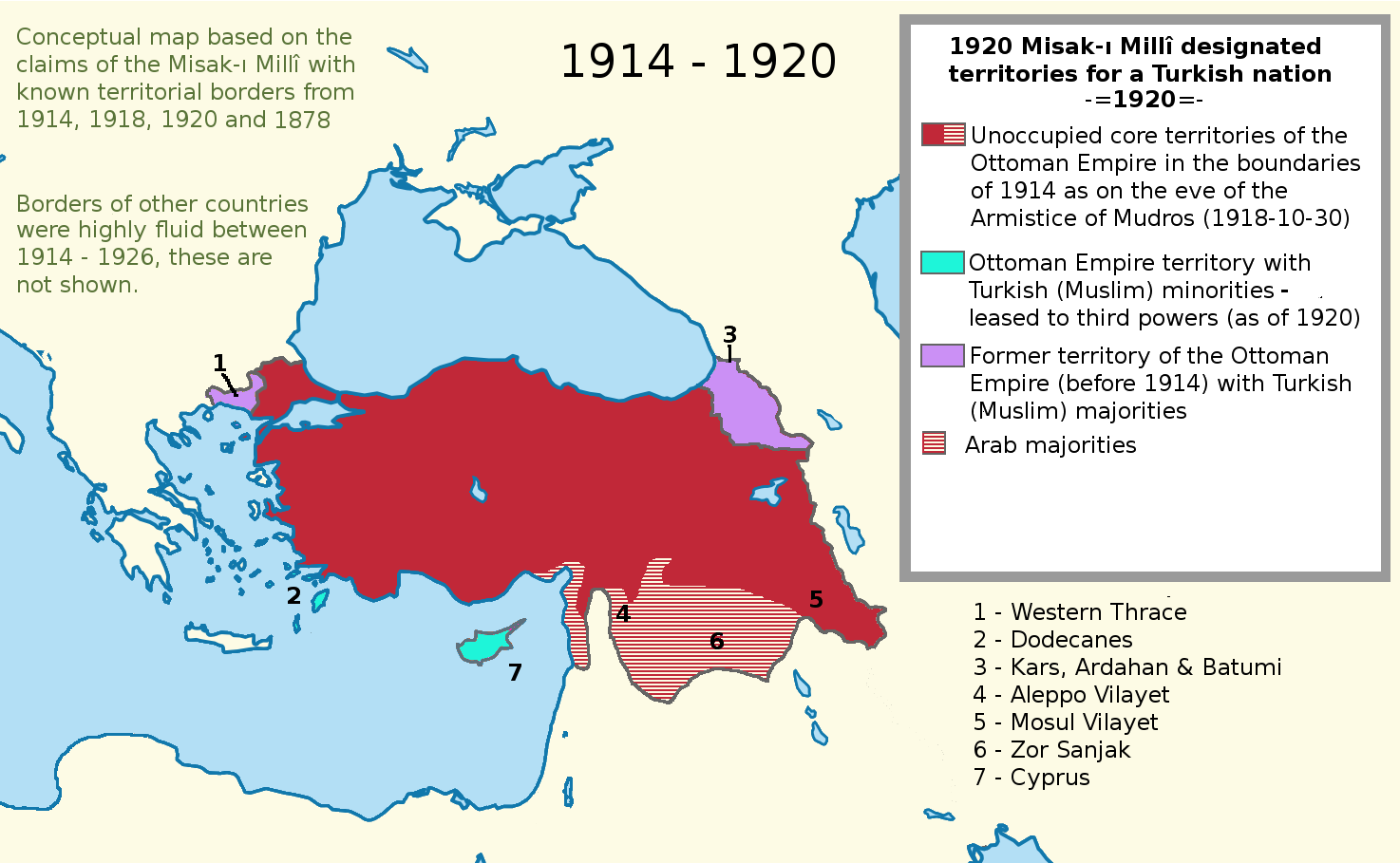
The Misak-ı Millî ("national oath") sought to include the Mosul vilayet in the proposals for the new borders of a Turkish nation in 1920.

Following the establishment of the Republic of Turkey in 1923, Iraqi Turkmens wanted Turkey to annex the Mosul vilayet and for them to become part of an expanded state; this is because, under the Ottoman monarchy, Iraqi Turkmens enjoyed a relatively trouble-free existence as the administrative and business classes. However, due to the demise of the Ottoman monarchy, Iraqi Turkmens participated in elections for the Constituent Assembly; the purpose of these elections was to formalise the 1922 treaty with the British government and obtain support for the drafting of a constitution and the passing of the 1923 Electoral law. Iraqi Turkmens made their participation in the electoral process conditional on the preservation of the Turkish character of Kirkuk's administration and the recognition of Turkish as the official language of the liwa. Although they were recognized as a constitutive entity of Iraq, alongside the Arabs and Kurds, in the constitution of 1925, Iraqi Turkmens were later denied this status.

Since the demise of the Ottoman Empire, Iraqi Turkmens have found themselves increasingly mistreated under successive regimes, such as in the massacres of 1923, 1946, and 1959, and from 1980, when the Ba'ath Party targeted the community.

== Culture ==
Iraqi Turkmens are mostly Muslim and have close cultural and linguistic ties with the Anatolian region of Turkey.

=== Language ===
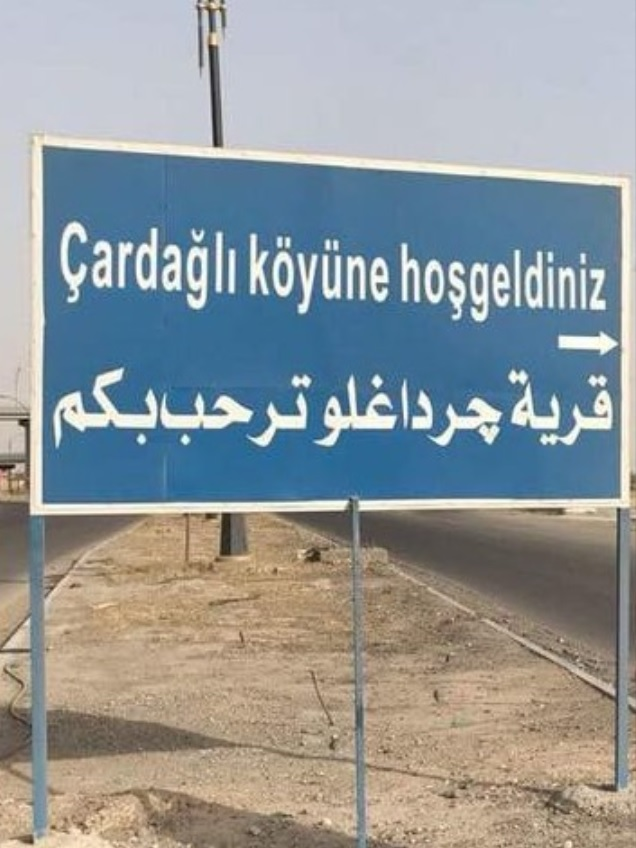
Bilingual sign (Arabic and Turkish) of a Turkmen village.

Iraqi Turkmen dialects fall under the Western Oghuz branch of Turkic languages, and are often referred to as "Iraqi Turkmen Turkish" "Iraqi Turkish", and "Iraqi Turkic". The dialects possess their own unique characteristics, but have also been influenced by the historical standards of Ottoman Turkish (which was the official language of administration and lingua franca in Iraq between 1534 and 1920) and neighboring Azerbaijani Turkic. In particular, standard (i.e. Istanbul) Turkish as a prestige language has exerted a profound influence on their dialects; thus, the syntax in Iraqi Turkmen differs sharply from neighboring Irano-Turkic varieties. Collectively, Iraqi Turkmen dialects also show similarities with Cypriot Turkish and Balkan Turkish regarding modality. The written language of the Iraqi Turkmens is based on Istanbul Turkish using the modern Turkish alphabet, and the name of the language between the Iraqi Turkmens is usually pronounced Turkman or turkmany, not the usual pronunciation in the other Turkmen speaking countries.

The Turkish language was recognized as a minority language in Kirkuk and Kifri in 1930, until the revolutionary government introduced the names "Turkman" and "Turkmanja" in 1959 with the aim of politically distancing the Turks of Iraq from Turkey. Then, in 1972, the Iraqi government banned the Turkish language and schools and media using Turkish were prohibited. Further bans on the Turkish language were made in the 1980s when the Ba'ath regime prohibited Iraqi Turkmens from speaking Turkish in public. It was not until 2005 that the Turkmen dialects were recognized under the Iraqi constitution; since then, Iraqi Turkmens have opened numerous Turkish schools and media exposure from Turkey has led to the standardisation of their dialects towards Standard Turkish and the preferable language for adolescents associating with the Turkish culture.

Some Iraqi Turkmens claimed that their language had Sumerian influence, which was present in many of the names of villages, cities, and foods. By 2021, researchers had discovered over 350 Turkmen words which traced back to Sumerian. There was also speculation that traditional Turkmen clothes strongly resembled Sumerian clothes.

Indeed, Iraqi Turkmens themselves (according to the 1957 census), as well as a range of linguistic sources, tend to view their language as a Turkish dialect (of Turkey), which they call Irak Türkmen Türkçesi, Irak Türkçesi, or Irak Türkmencesi. Studies have long noted the similarities between Iraqi Turkmens and certain Southeastern Anatolian dialects around the region of Urfa and Diyarbakır, or have described it as an "Anatolian" or an "Eastern Anatolian dialect". There are also linguists who have said that Iraqi Turkmen is closer to Azerbaijani, placing the Kirkuk dialect as "more or less" an "Azerbaijani Turkish" dialect. Yet, the Kirkuk dialect also shows comparable features with Urfa, and there are other regions in the Kirkuk Governorate, such as Altun Kupri, Taza Khurmatu, and Bashir, which are said to show unity with the Eastern Anatolian dialect of Urfa. Indeed, the dialects spoken in Turkmen-dominated regions in other parts of the country – including Amirli, Kifri, Tal Afar and Tuz Khurmatu – are all said to be similar to the Turkish dialect of Urfa. Hence, there are linguists who acknowledge similarities with Azerbaijani spoken in Iran but say that Iraqi Turkmens has "greater proximity to Turkish of Turkey". According to Christiane Bulut, Iraqi Turkman is neither Azeri nor Anatolian Turkish but "a transitional dialect group, displaying linguistic features similar to both".

Besides their traditional dialects, the Iraqi Turkmen diaspora also communicate in standard (Istanbul) Turkish, whilst the younger generations in Iraq (below the age of 18 in 2019) speak Istanbul Turkish with ease. In addition, diglossia in Iraq Turkmen dialects and Istanbul Turkish has become a widespread phenomenon. Most Iraqi Turkmens can also speak Arabic and/or Kurdish.

==== Dialects ====
Due to the existence of different Turkish migration waves to Iraq for over 1,200 years, the Iraqi Turkmen varieties are by no means homogeneous; dialects can vary according to regional features. Several prestige languages in the region have been particularly influential: Ottoman Turkish from 1534 onwards and then Persian after the Capture of Baghdad (1624). Once the Ottoman Empire retook Iraq in 1640 the Turkish varieties of Iraq continued to be influenced by Ottoman Turkish, as well as other languages in the region, such as Arabic and Kurdish. Ottoman Turkish had a strong influence in Iraq until 1920, for it was not only the official language of administration but also the lingua franca. Indeed, Turkish has remained a prestige language among Iraqi Turkmen, exerting a profound historical influence on their dialect. As a result, Iraqi Turkmen syntax differs sharply from Irano-Turkic.

In general, the Iraqi Turkmen dialects of Tal Afar (approx 700,000 speakers), Altun Kupri, Tuz Khurmatu, Taza Khurmatu, Kifri, Bashir and Amirli show unity with the Eastern Anatolian dialect of Urfa; meanwhile, the dialects in Kirkuk, Erbil, Dohuk, Mandali and Khanaqin show similarities with Azerbaijani Tabrizi and Afshar Turkic dialects. Yet, the Kirkuk dialect also shows comparable features with Urfa, and 21.4% of Kirkuk province's population had self-declared their mother tongue as "Turkish" in the last census which asked about language. In particular, a cultural orientation towards Turkey prevails among Iraqi Turkmen intellectuals and diglossia (Turkish of Turkey) is very frequent in educated circles, especially in Kirkuk. In addition, the Erbil dialect shows similarities with Turkish dialects stretching from Kosovo to Rize, Erzurum and Malatya.

Iraqi Turkmens generally also have an active command in standard Turkish due to their cultural orientation towards the Republic of Turkey. Turkish media outlets (especially satellite TV) has been influential; moreover, there are a number of private schools which teach in Turkish backed by Turkish institutions. Thus, diglossia in Iraqi Turkmen and standard Turkish (of Turkey) has become a widespread phenomenon.

In 2020, a request to grant a ISO 639 code for Iraqi Turkmen was submitted to SIL, but later rejected in 2024 as it doesn't meet the criteria for being a distinct language.

==== Politicisation ====
Professor Christiane Bulut has argued that publications from Azerbaijan often use expressions such as "Azerbaijani (dialects) of Iraq" or "South Azerbaijani" to describe Iraqi Turkmen dialects "with political implications"; however, in Turcological literature, closely related dialects in Turkey and Iraq are generally referred to as "eastern Anatolian" or "Iraq-Turkic/-Turkman" dialects, respectively.

Furthermore, the terms "Turkmen/Turkman" are also considered to be historically political because in the early 20th century the minority were simply recognized as Turks who spoke the Turkish language, until after the military coup of 14 July 1958, when the ruling military junta introduced the names "Turkman/Turkmen" to distance the Turks of Iraq from those in Anatolia, and then banned the Turkish language in 1972.

==== Official status ====
Under the British Mandate over Iraq, the Turkish language was recognized as an official language in Kirkuk and Kifri under Article 5 of the Language Act of 1930. Article 6 of the Act permitted the language of education to be determined by the native language of the majority of students, whilst Article 2 and Article 4 gave Iraqi citizens the right to have court hearings and decisions verbally translated into Arabic, Kurdish, or Turkish in all cases.

Upon Iraq's entry into the League of Nations in 1932, the League demanded that Iraq recognize its ethnic and religious minorities. Consequently, the Turkish language, alongside Kurdish, was to be recognized as an official language under the Iraqi constitution of 1932: "in the liwa of Kirkuk, where a considerable part of the population is of Turkmen race, the official language, side by side with Arabic, shall be either Kurdish or Turkish". According to Article 1, no law, order, or act of government was allowed to contradict the terms of the 1932 constitution, nor could it be changed in the future.

However, in 1959 the military junta introduced the names "Turkman" and "Turkmanja". More recently, Article 4 of the 2005 Iraqi Constitution recognizes "Turkomen" as an official minority language in the "administrative units in which they constitute density of population" (alongside Syriac).

==== Adoption of the Turkish alphabet ====
In 1997 the Iraqi Turkmen Congress adopted a Declaration of Principles, Article Three states that "the official written language of the Turkmen is Istanbul Turkish, and its alphabet is the new Latin alphabet." By 2005 the Turkish language replaced traditional Turkmeni, which had used the Arabic script, in Iraqi schools.

=== Education in Turkish ===
Iraq's first two Turkmen schools were opened on 17 November 1993, one in Erbil and the other in Kifri.

In 2010 the Turkmen Federation of Scouts (Türkmen Izcilik Federasyonu) was founded, based in Kirkuk.

In 2005 Iraqi Turkmen community leaders decided that the Turkish language would replace the use of traditional Turkmeni in Iraqi schools; Turkmeni had used the Arabic script whereas Turkish uses the Latin script (see Turkish alphabet). Kelsey Shanks has argued that "the move to Turkish can be seen as a means to strengthen the collective "we" identity by continuing to distinguish it from the other ethnic groups. ... The use of Turkish was presented as a natural progression from the Turkmen; any suggestion that the oral languages were different was immediately rejected."

Parental literacy rates in Turkish are low, as most are more familiar with the Arabic script (due to the Ba'athist regime). Therefore, the Turkmen Directorate of Education in Kirkuk has started Turkish language lessons for the wider society. Furthermore, the Turkmen officer for the Ministry of Education in Nineveh has requested from the "United Nations Assistance Mission for Iraq" the instigation of Turkish language classes for parents.

=== Media in Turkish ===
The current prevalence of satellite television and media exposure from Turkey may have led to the standardisation of Turkmeni towards Turkish, and the preferable language for adolescents associating with the Turkish culture.

In 2004 the Türkmeneli TV channel was launched in Kirkuk, Iraq. It broadcasts programmes in the Turkish and Arabic languages. As of 2012, Türkmeneli TV has studios in Kirkuk and Baghdad in Iraq, and in the Çankaya neighbourhood in Ankara, Turkey. Türkmeneli TV has signed agreements with several Turkish channels, such as TRT, TGRT and ATV, as well as with the Turkish Republic of Northern Cyprus's main broadcaster BRT, to share programmes and documentaries.

=== Religion ===
Iraqi Turkmens are predominantly Muslims. Sunni Turkmens form the majority (about 60–70%), but there is also a significant number of Turkmens practicing the Shia branch of Islam (about 30% to 40%). Nonetheless, Turkmens are mainly secular, having internalized the secularist interpretation of state–religion affairs practiced in the Republic of Turkey since its foundation in 1923. However, there were also instances of sectarian violence between Sunni and Shia Turkmens. Turkmens largely live in urban areas, dealing with trade and commerce, and usually tend to acquire higher education. The power of religious and tribal factors inherent in the Arab and Kurdish cultures does not significantly affect the Turkmens. Although Iraqi Turkmens also had tribes, their traditions and customs significantly differed from those of Arab tribes. Turkmen women also had a higher standing in the family, and polygamy was very rare among Iraqi Turkmen men.

A small minority of Iraqi Turkmens are Catholics, and their number was estimated at 30,000 in 2015. In 2017, Iraqi Turkmen Catholics constituted around 1% of the Iraqi Turkmen community. Iraqi Turkmen Catholics were distinct from Citadel Christians. Iraqi Turkmen Catholics were Latin Catholic and lived in all areas of Turkmeneli, including Kirkuk. The Citadel Christians were Chaldean Catholic and lived only in Kirkuk. Furthermore, Citadel Christians were ethnically Assyrian whereas the Iraqi Turkmen Catholics were ethnically Turkic. Citadel Christians, numbering only "a few thousand" in 2017, were significantly fewer than Iraqi Turkmen Catholics. The Turkmen Bible Partnership translated the New Testament into the Iraqi Turkmen dialect and printed and distributed 2,000 copies of it in 2021. The presence of Christian Turkmens in Iraq dated back to the Seljuk and Ilkhanid periods, when Turkmen tribes settled in Mesopotamia and some members of the tribes either retained or adopted local Christian beliefs. Certain Turkmen Christian families in Iraq preserved religious identities distinct from both Muslim Turkmens and Aramaic-speaking Christians. Max van Berchem’s survey of linguistic minorities in Ottoman Iraq included mention of “Christian Turks” in Mosul and Kirkuk. Some Turkmen Christians were massacred by the Assyrian Levies and later the Ba'athists. The Iraqi Turkmen Front (ITF) largely defined Turkmen identity in Sunni terms, often excluding Shia and Christian Turkmens.

Historically, many Iraqi Turkmens belonged to religious sects which followed Qizilbash doctrine. The religious sects were separate but closely related. They were all very secretive about their faith. They originated during the Safavid era, and by the 1920s, Twelver Shia missionaries from Southern Iraq had converted them all to orthodox Shia Islam. One of the most prominent of the sects was Ibrahimiyya. Many Iraqi Turkmen also adhered to Bektashi Alevism. Bektashi Turkmen were prominent in Tal Afar, Tuz Khurmatu, and Taza Khurmatu. There were no mosques in Tal Afar until the 1940s. There was a Bektashi tekke in the Tisin neighborhood of Kirkuk, although it was destroyed by the Iraqi army under Saddam Hussein. The Tekke of Kizildeli Seyyid Ali Sultan was located in Tal Afar. By the 20th century, most Bektashi Turkmen had converted to Twelverism, but many continued adhering to Alevism.

== Demographics ==
=== Population ===
==== Official statistics ====
Iraqi Turkmens are the third largest ethnic group in Iraq. According to 2013 data from the Iraqi Ministry of Planning, Iraqi Turkmens have a population of about 3 million out of the total population of about 34.7 million (approximately 9% of the country's population).

==== Past censuses and controversies ====
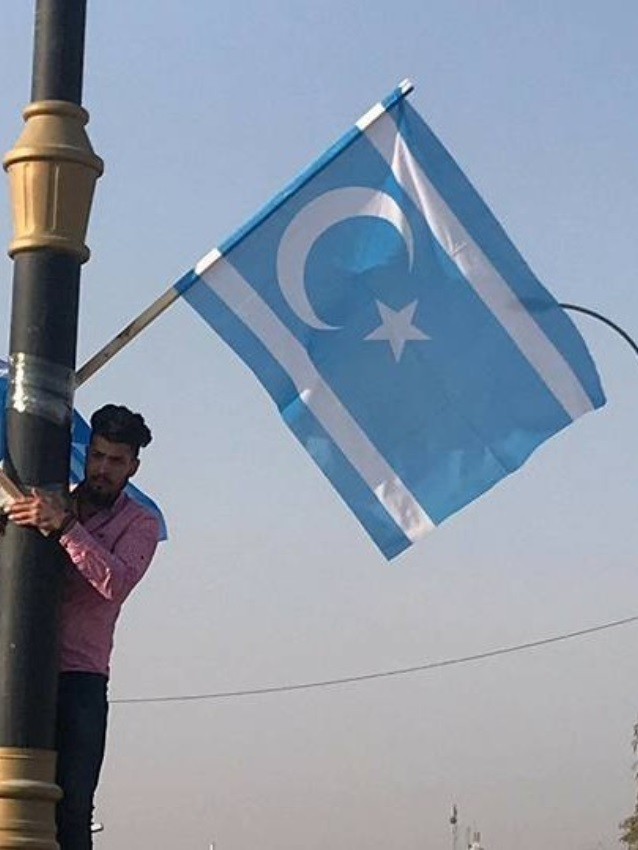
An Iraqi Turkmen in Kirkuk.

According to Mesut Yeğen, documents from the British Foreign Office claim that the Turkmens made a majority in the city of Erbil in 1919 The 1957 Iraqi census (which is recognized as the last reliable census, as later censuses were reflections of the Arabization policies of the Ba'ath regime) recorded 567,000 Turks out of a total population of 6.3 million, forming 9% of the total Iraqi population. This put them third, behind Arabs and Kurds. However, due to the undemocratic environment, their number has always been underestimated and has long been a point of controversy. For example, in the 1957 census, the Iraqi government first claimed that there was 136,800 Turks in Iraq. However, the revised figure of 567,000 was issued after the 1958 revolution when the Iraqi government admitted that the Iraqi Turkmen population was actually more than 400% from the previous year's total. Scott Taylor has described the political nature of the results thusly:

According to the 1957 census conducted by King Faisal II – a monarch supported by the British – there were only 136,800 Turkmen in all of Iraq. Bearing in mind that since the British had wrested control of Mesopotamia from the Turks after the First World War, a deliberate campaign had been undertaken to eradicate or diminish all remnants of Ottoman influence. Therefore it should not be surprising that after Abdul Karim Kassem launched his successful revolution in 1958 – killing 23-year-old King Faisal II, expelling the British and declaring Iraq a republic – that a different set of numbers was published. According to the second census of 1958, the Turkmen registry stood at 567,000 – an increase of more than 400 per cent from the previous year's total.

Subsequent censuses, in 1967, 1977, 1987 and 1997, are all considered highly unreliable, due to suspicions of manipulation by the various regimes in Iraq. The 1997 census states that there was 600,000 Iraqi Turkmens out of a total population of 22,017,983, forming 2.72% of the total Iraqi population; however, this census only allowed its citizens to indicate belonging to one of two ethnicities, Arab or Kurd, this meant that many Iraqi Turkmens identified themselves as Arabs (the Kurds not being a desirable ethnic group in Saddam Hussein's Iraq), thereby skewing the true number of Iraqi Turkmens.

==== Other estimates ====
In 2004 Scott Taylor suggested that the Iraqi Turkmen population accounted for 2,080,000 of Iraq's 25 million inhabitants (forming 8.32% of the population) whilst Patrick Clawson has stated that Iraqi Turkmens make up about 9% of the total population. Furthermore, international organizations such as the Unrepresented Nations and Peoples Organization has stated that the Iraqi Turkmen community is 3 million or 9–13% of the Iraqi population. Iraqi Turkmens claim that their total population is over 3 million.

=== Areas of settlement ===
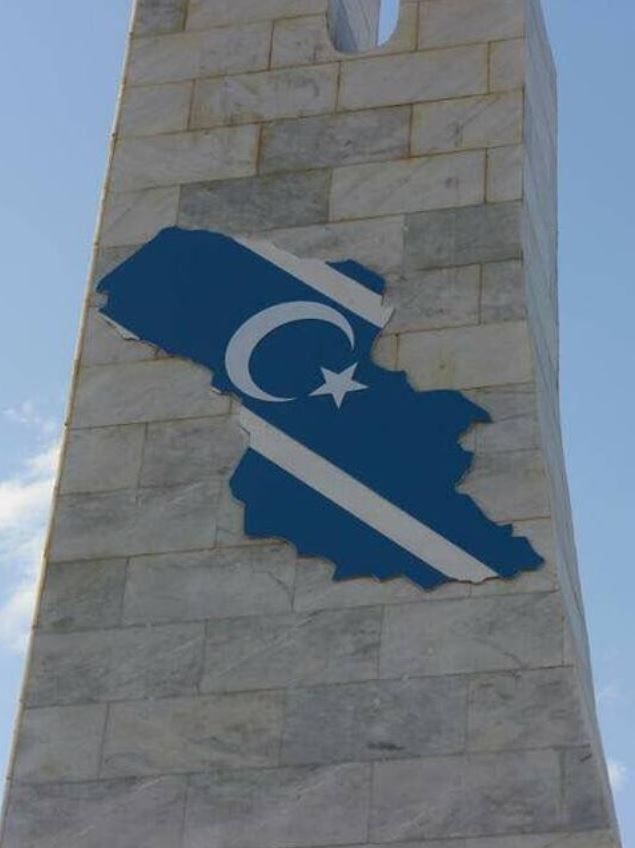
A map of Turkmeneli (Turkish: Türkmeneli) on a monument in Altun Kupri (Turkish: Altınköprü).

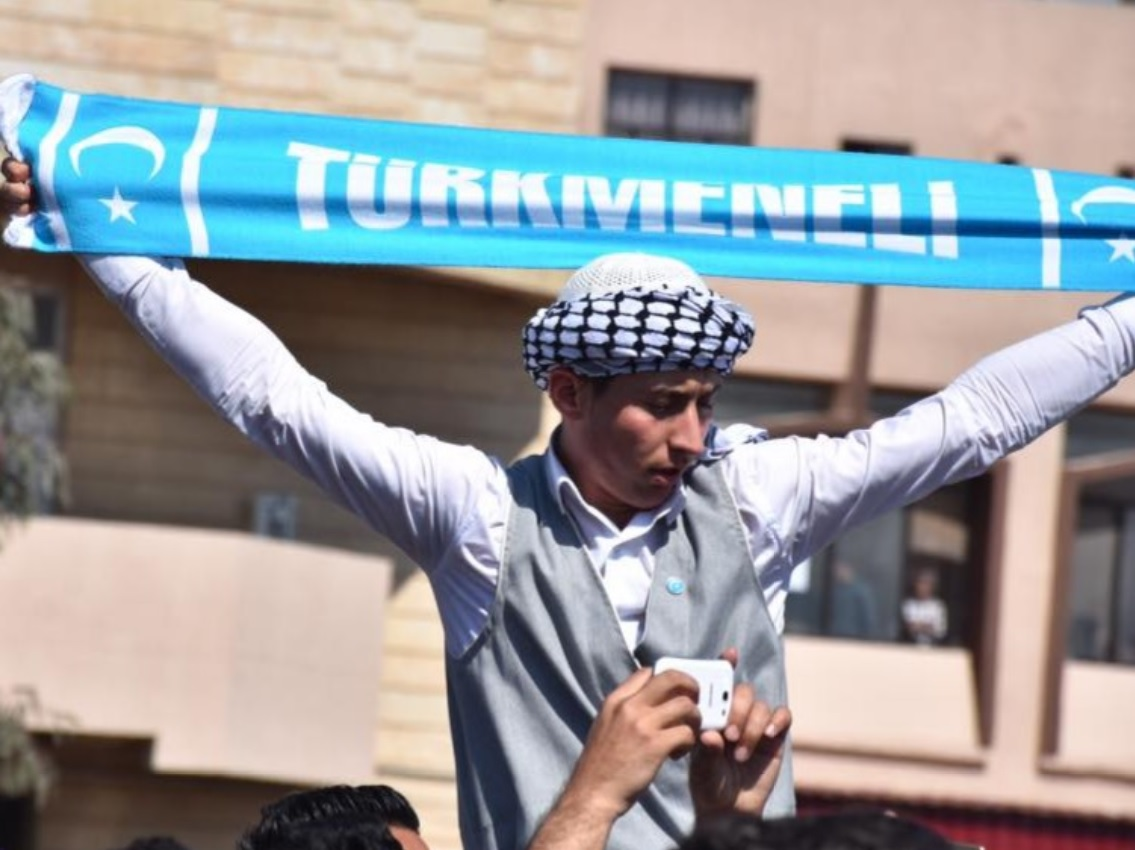
An Iraqi Turkmen youth holding a Turkmeneli scarf.

Iraqi Turkmens primarily inhabit northern Iraq, in a region they refer to as "Turkmeneli" which stretches from the northwest to the east at the middle of Iraq. Iraqi Turkmens consider their capital city to be Kirkuk. Liam Anderson and Gareth Stansfield describe the Turkmeneli region as follows:

...what Turkmens refer to as Turkmeneli – a vast swath of territory running from Iraq's border with Turkey and Syria and diagonally down the country to the border with Iran. Turkmen sources note that Turcomania – an Anglicized version of "Turkmeneli" – appears on a map of the region published by William Guthrie in 1785, but there is no clear reference to Turkmeneli until the end of the twentieth century.

Iraqi Turkmens generally consider several major cities, and small districts associated with these cities, as part of Turkmeneli. The major cities claimed to be a part of their homeland include: Altun Kupri, Badra, Bakuba, Diala, Erbil, Khanaqin, Kifri, Kirkuk, Kizilribat, Mendeli, Mosul, Salahaldeen, Sancar, Tal Afar, and Tuz Khurmatu. Thus, the Turkmeneli region lies between the Arab areas of settlement to the south and Kurdish areas to the north.

According to the 1957 census, Iraqi Turkmens formed the majority of inhabitants in the city of Kirkuk, with 40% declaring their mother tongue as "Turkish". The second-largest Iraqi Turkmen city is Tel Afar where they make up 95% of the inhabitants. The once mainly Turkoman cities of the Diyala Province such as Kifri have been heavily Kurdified and Arabized.

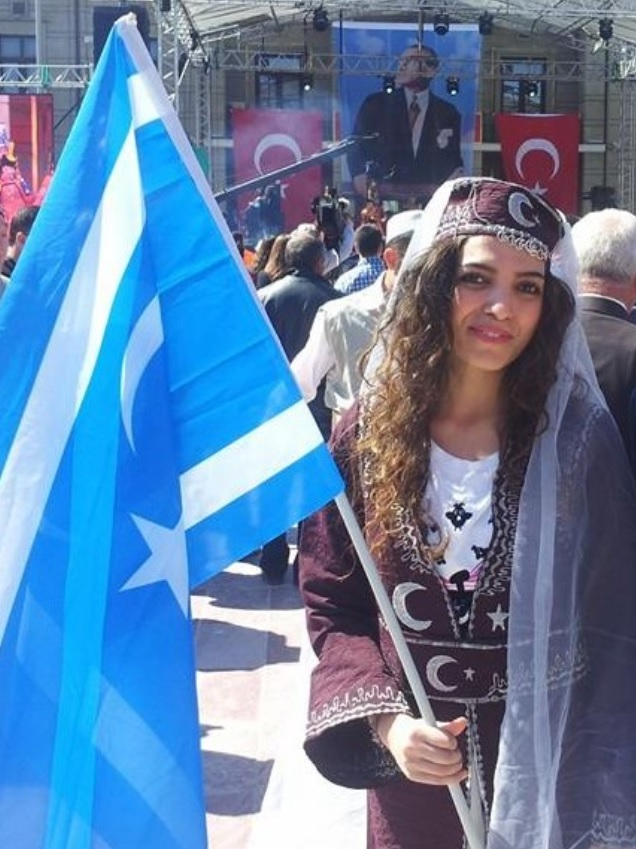
An Iraqi Turkmen woman in Istanbul, Turkey.

Some Iraqi Turkmens also live outside the Turkmeneli region. For example, there is a significant community living in Iraq's capital city of Baghdad, especially in the neighbourhoods of Adhamiyah and Ragheba Khatun.

The Turkmen population in Erbil is estimated to be around 300,000. They mainly reside in the neighbourhoods of Taci, Mareke and Three Tak in Erbil's city centre, around the citadel. Until 2006, they were living in the Tophane, Tekke and Saray neighborhoods of the Citadel, which contained almost 700 houses. In 2006, the citadel was emptied, and the Turkmens in the citadel were relocated to other neighbourhoods. Some Turkmens also participate in the political institutions of the KRG, including the Parliament. Erbil's citadel also contains the Turkmen Culture House.

=== Diaspora ===
Most Iraqi Turkmens migrate to Turkey, followed by Germany, Denmark, and Sweden. There are also Iraqi Turkmen communities living in Canada, the United States, Australia, New Zealand, Greece, the Netherlands, and the United Kingdom.

According to Professor Suphi Saatçi, in 2010 approximately 1,000 Iraqi Turkmens were living in Canada, 2,000 in Denmark, and 4,000 in the Netherlands. Since the European migrant crisis (2014–19) the number of Iraqi Turkmen has continued to increase in Europe.

There are many established Iraqi Turkmen diaspora communities, such as the Canadian Iraqi Turkmen Culture Association, based in Canada.

The Turkoman community in Chicago dates from the aftermath of the Iran-Iraq War and the Gulf War. They have tended to settle in the northern neighborhoods of the city and in the suburbs, and many have taken jobs as factory workers or cabdrivers. Owing to their small size, they attend the mosques of other communities. They maintain a distinct cultural identity and close ties with brethren outside of Chicago.

== Persecution ==
The position of Iraqi Turkmens has changed from being administrative and business classes of the Ottoman Empire to an increasingly discriminated against minority. Since the demise of the Ottoman Empire, Iraqi Turkmens have been victims of several massacres, such as the 1959 Kirkuk massacre. Furthermore, under the Ba'ath party, discrimination against Iraqi Turkmens increased, with several leaders being executed in 1979 as well as the Iraqi Turkmen community being victims of Arabization policies by the state, and Kurdification by Kurds seeking to push them forcibly out of their homeland. The Turkmen had also suffered in the Anfal campaign, despite tensions with Kurds over Kirkuk after 2003. Moreover, the government of Turgut Özal only gave attention to Sunni Turkmens and ignored the Shias. Thus, they have suffered from various degrees of suppression and assimilation that ranged from political persecution and exile to terror and ethnic cleansing. Despite being recognized in the 1925 constitution as a constitutive entity, Iraqi Turkmens were later denied this status; hence, cultural rights were gradually taken away and activists were sent to exile.

=== Massacres ===
==== 1924 Kirkuk massacre ====
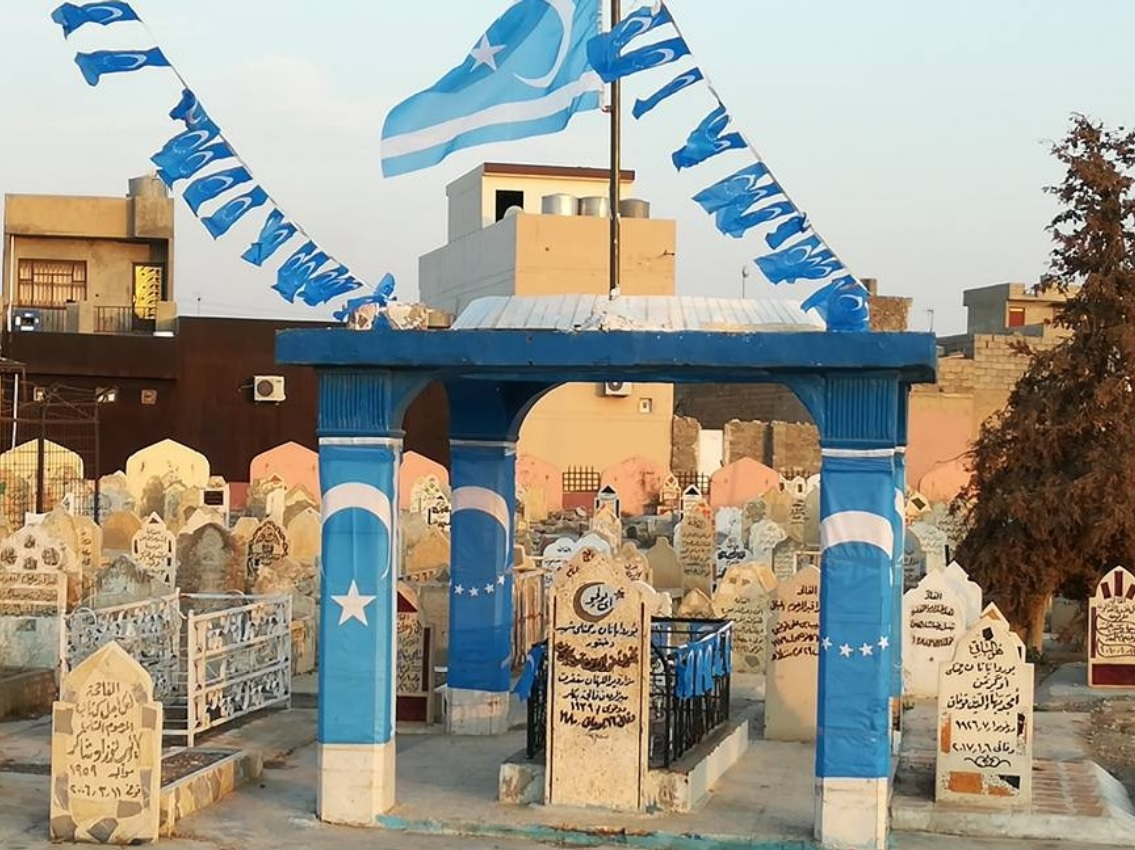
Iraqi Turkmen cemetery.

In 1924, Iraqi Turkmens were seen as a disloyal remnant of the Ottoman Empire, with a natural tie to Mustafa Kemal Atatürk's new Turkish nationalist ideology emerging in the Republic of Turkey. The Iraqi Turkmens living in the region of Kirkuk were perceived as posing a threat to the stability of Iraq, particularly as they did not support the ascendancy of King Faisal I to the Iraqi throne. On 4 May, these tensions boiled over into violence when soldiers from the Iraq Levies —a levied force raised by the British government after World War I and consisting primarily of Assyrians — clashed with Turkmens in a Kirkuk market square after a dispute between an Assyrian soldier and a Turkmen shopkeeper. In the ensuing fracas, 200 Turkmens were killed by Assyrian soldiers.

==== 1946 Gavurbağı massacre ====
Around 20 Iraqi Turkmen civilians were killed by Iraqi policemen including women and children on 12 July 1946 in Gavurbağı, Kirkuk.

==== 1959 Kirkuk massacre ====
The Kirkuk massacre of 1959 came about due to the Iraqi government allowing the Iraqi Communist Party, which in Kirkuk was largely Kurdish, to target Iraqi Turkmens. With the appointment of Maarouf Barzinji, a Kurd, as the mayor of Kirkuk in July 1959, tensions rose following 14 July revolution celebrations, with animosity in the city polarizing rapidly between the Kurds and Iraqi Turkmens. On 14 July 1959, skirmishes broke out between Iraqi Turkmens and Kurds, leaving some 20 Iraqi Turkmens dead. Furthermore, on 15 July 1959, Kurdish soldiers of the Fourth Brigade of the Iraqi army mortared Iraqi Turkmen residential areas, destroying 120 houses. Order was restored on 17 July by military units from Baghdad. The Iraqi government referred to the incident as a "massacre" and stated that between 31 and 79 Iraqi Turkmens were killed and some 130 injured.

==== 1991 Altun Kupri massacre ====
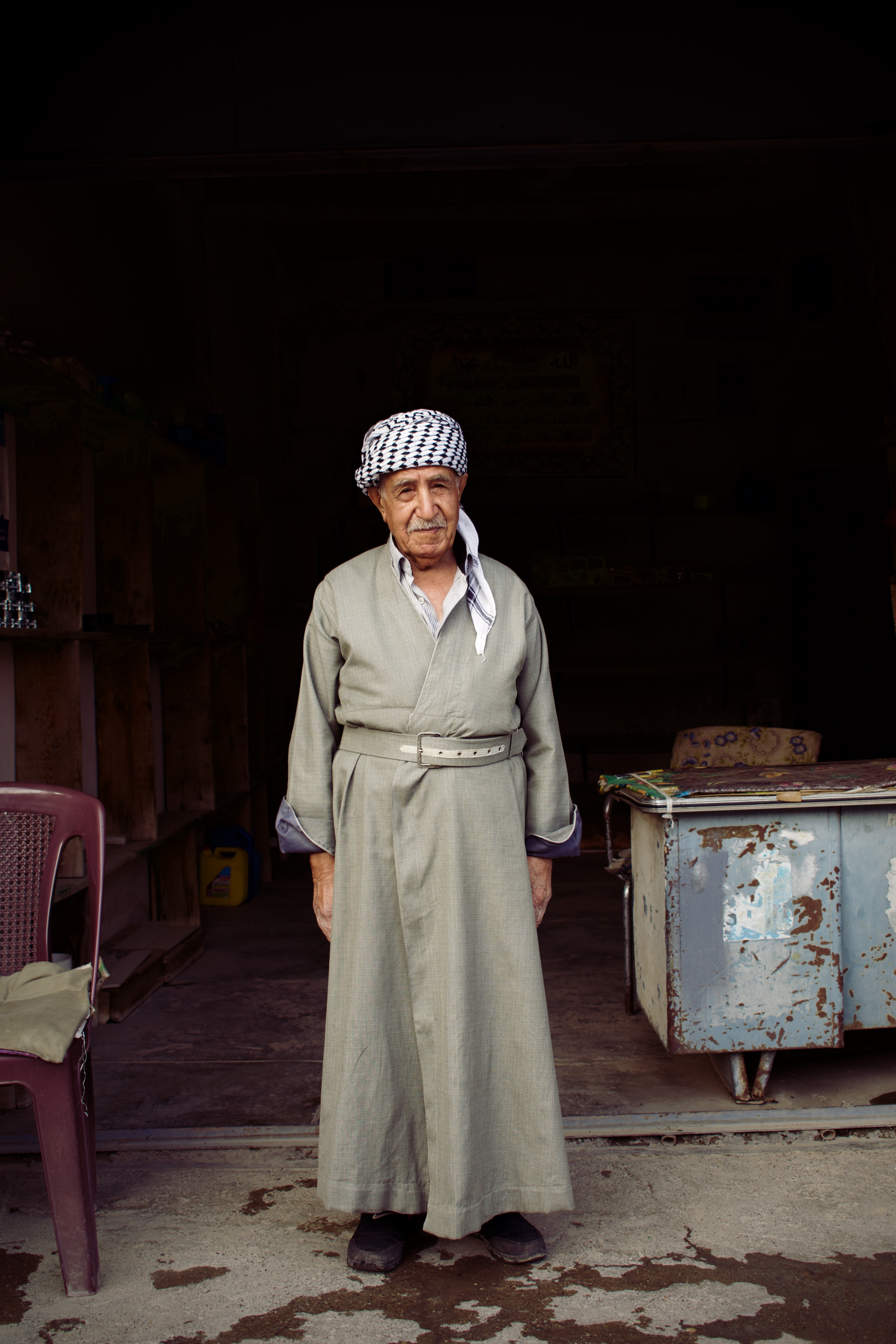
Local resident wearing traditional Turkmen clothes in Altun Kupri.

Over 135 Turkmen civilians were killed on 28 March 1991 during the Gulf War by Iraqi forces, in the Turkmen town of Altun Kupri.

=== Arabization ===
The government of Saddam Hussein had heavily restricted the cultural rights of Iraqi Turkmen and adopted a policy of assimilation. Due to government relocation programs, thousands of Iraqi Turkmen were relocated from their traditional homelands in northern Iraq and replaced by Arabs, in an effort to Arabize the region. Furthermore, Iraqi Turkmen villages and towns were destroyed to make way for Arab migrants, who were promised free land and financial incentives. For example, the Ba'ath regime recognised that the city of Kirkuk was historically an Iraqi Arab city and remained firmly in its cultural orientation.

=== Turkmen–Kurdish tension and Kurdification ===
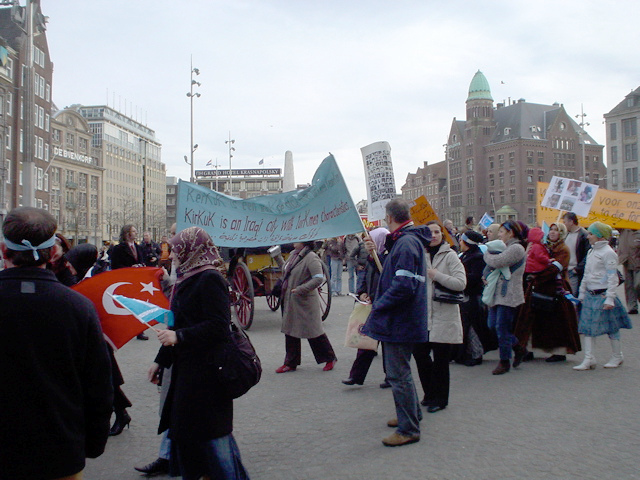
Iraqi Turkmens protesting in Amsterdam, the banner reads: 'Kirkuk is an Iraqi city with Turkmen characteristics'.

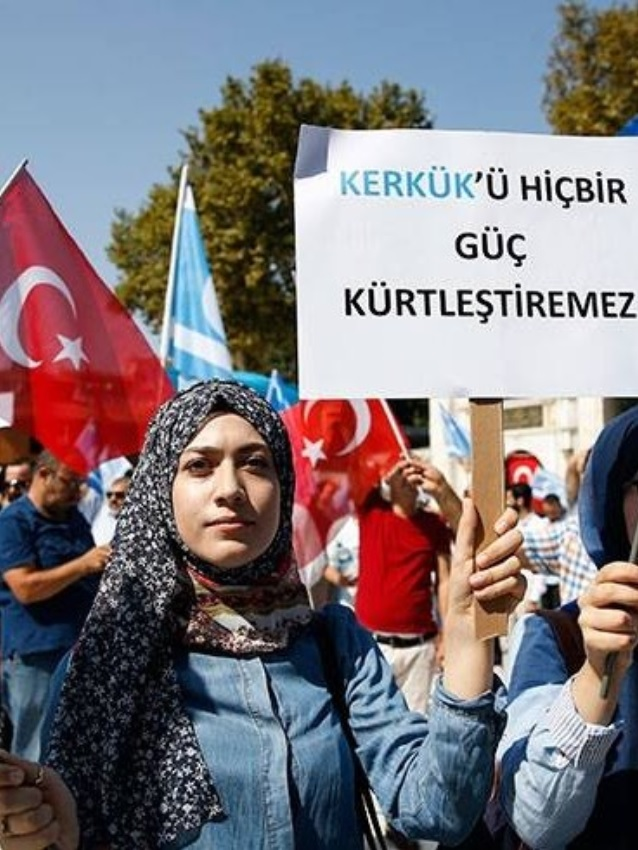
Iraqi Turkmen woman holding a placard written in Turkish: Kerkük'ü hiçbir güç Kürtleştiremez ("No power can Kurdify Kirkuk").

The Kurds claimed de facto sovereignty over land that Iraqi Turkmens regard as theirs. For the Iraqi Turkmens, their identity is deeply inculcated as the rightful inheritors of the region as a legacy of the Ottoman Empire. Thus, it is claimed that the Kurdistan Region and Iraqi government has constituted a threat to the survival of Iraqi Turkmens through strategies aimed at eradicating or assimilating them. The formation of the Kurdistan Region in 1991 created high animosity between the Kurds and Iraqi Turkmen, resulting in some Iraqi Turkmen being victims of Kurdification, according to Liam Anderson. The largest concentration of Iraqi Turkmen tended to be in the de facto capital of Erbil, a city which they had assumed prominent administrative and economic positions. Thus, they increasingly came into dispute and often conflict with the ruling powers of the city, which after 1996 was the Kurdistan Democratic Party of Massoud Barzani.

According to Anderson and Stansfield, in the 1990s, tension between Kurds and Iraqi Turkmens inflamed as the KDP and the Patriotic Union of Kurdistan (PUK) were institutionalized as the political hegemons of the region and, from the perspective of the Iraqi Turkmens, sought to marginalize them from the positions of authority and to subsume their culture with an all-pervading Kurdistani identity. With the support of Ankara, a new political front of Turkmen parties, the Iraqi Turkmen Front (ITF), was formed on 24 April 1995. The relationship between the Iraqi Turkmen Front and the KDP was tense and deteriorated as the decade went on. Iraqi Turkmens associated with the Iraqi Turkmen Front complained about harassment by Kurdish security forces. In March 2000, the Human Rights Watch reported that the KDP's security attacked the offices of the ITF in Erbil, killing two guards, following a lengthy period of disputes between the two parties. In 2002, the KDP created an Iraqi Turkmen political organization, the Turkmen National Association, that supported the further institutionalization of the Kurdistan Region. This was viewed by pro-ITF Iraqi Turkmens as a deliberate attempt to "buy off" Iraqi Turkmen opposition and break their bonds with Ankara. Promoted by the KDP as the "true voice" of the Iraqi Turkmens, the Turkmen National Association has a pro-Kurdistani stance and has effectively weakened the ITF as the sole representative voice of the Iraqi Turkmens. Beginning in 2003, there were riots between Kurds and Turkmen in Kirkuk, a city that Turkmens view as historically theirs. According to United Nations reports, the KRG and Peshmerga were "illegally policing Kirkurk, abducting Turkmens and Arabs and subjecting them to torture".

=== Sectarian violence ===
Between 2003 and 2006, 1,350 Turkmens in Tal Afar died mainly from sectarian violence between Sunnis and Shias, as well as war. Thousands of houses were damaged or demolished, resulting in 4,685 displaced families.

== Politics ==
Between ten and twelve Turkmen individuals were elected to the transitional National Assembly of Iraq in January 2005, including five on the United Iraqi Alliance list, three from the Iraqi Turkmen Front (ITF), and either two or four from the Democratic Patriotic Alliance of Kurdistan.

In the December 2005 elections, between five and seven Turkmen candidates were elected to the Council of Representatives. This included one candidate from the ITF (its leader Saadeddin Arkej), two or four from the United Iraqi Alliance, one from the Iraqi Accord Front and one from the Kurdistani Alliance.

Iraqi Turkmens have also emerged as a key political force in the controversy over the future status of northern Iraq and the Kurdistan Region. The government of Turkey has helped fund such political organizations as the Iraqi Turkmen Front, which opposes Iraqi federalism and in particular the proposed annexation of Kirkuk to the Kurdistan Regional Government.

Tensions between the two groups over Kirkuk, however, have slowly died out and on 30 January 2006, the President of Iraq, Jalal Talabani, said that the "Kurds are working on a plan to give Iraqi Turkmens autonomy in areas where they are a majority in the new constitution they're drafting for the Kurdistan Region of Iraq." However, it never happened and the policies of Kurdification by KDP and PUK after 2003 (with non-Kurds being pressed to move) have prompted serious inter-ethnic problems.

== Notable people ==
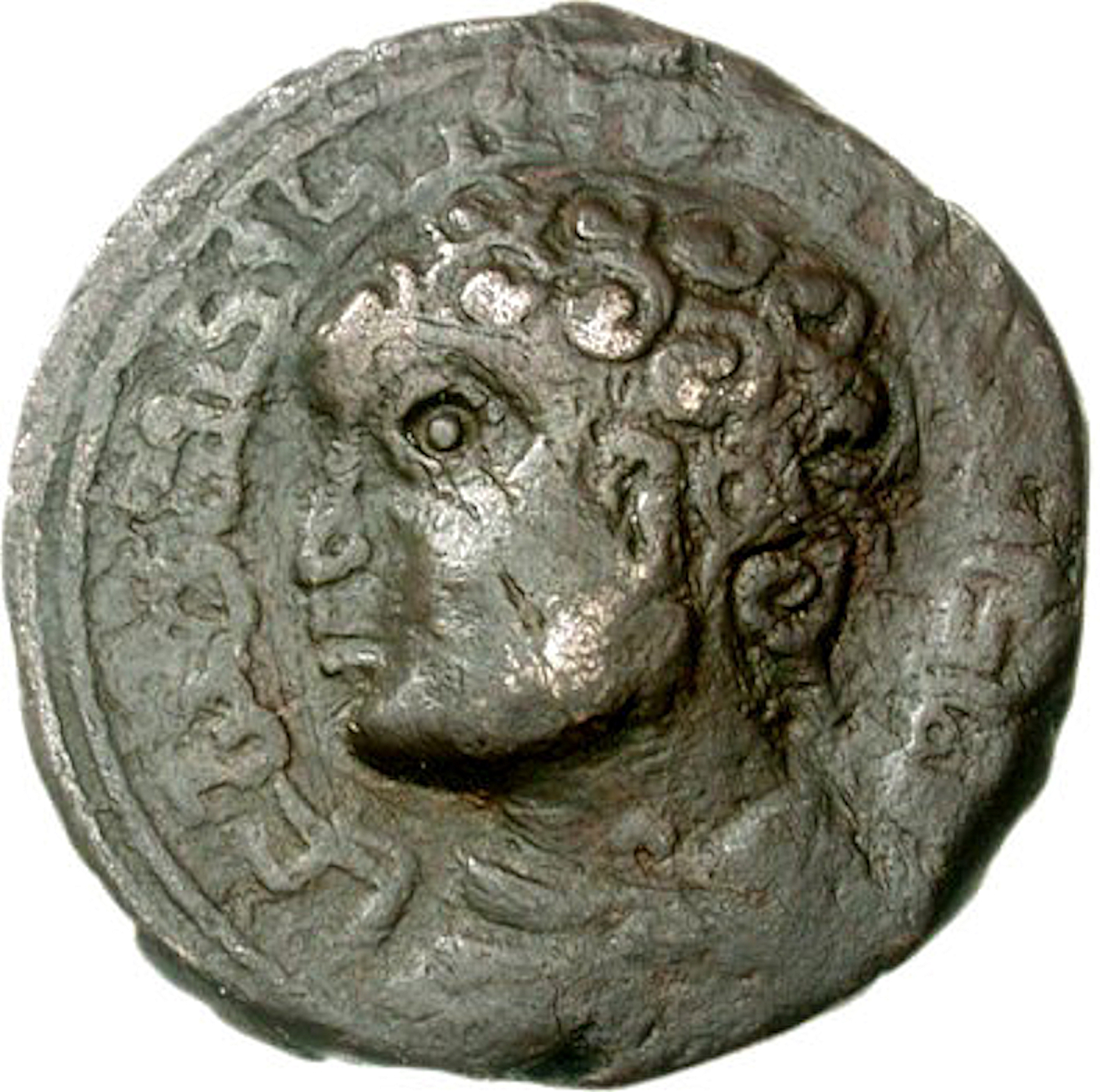
Gökböri

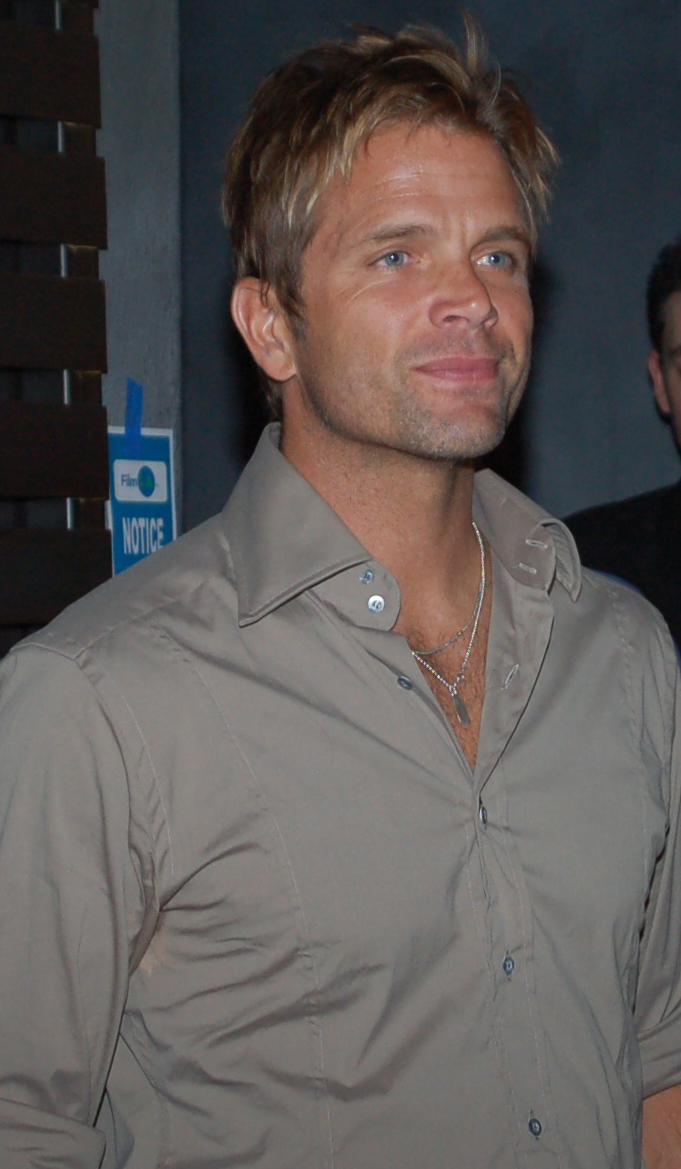
David Chokachi

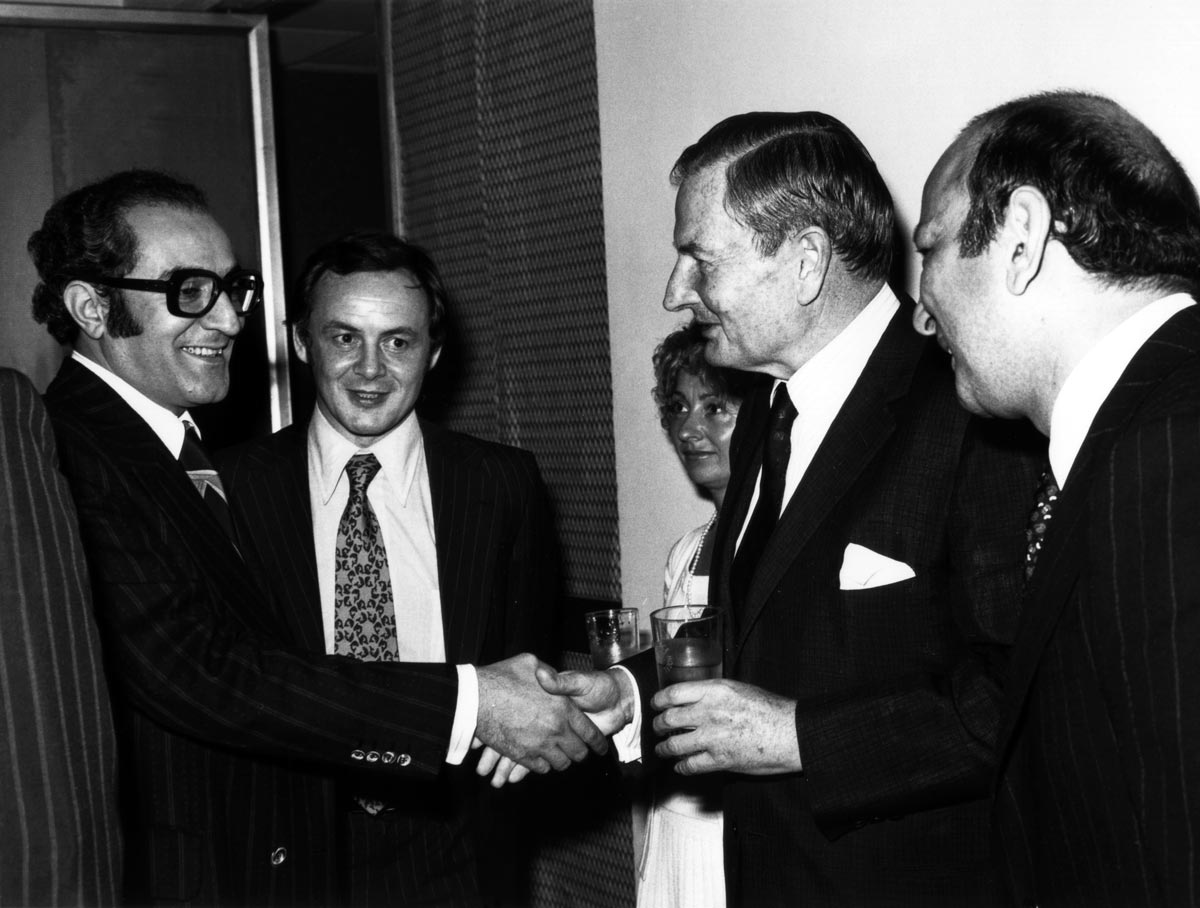
Nemir Kirdar

- Mohammed Samaan Agha, Iraqi politician
- Ahmet Haşim, Turkish writer
- Farah Zeynep Abdullah, Turkish actress
- Abbas al-Bayati, politician
- Mohammed Mahdi al-Bayati, Iraqi politician
- Yasin al-Hashimi, former Prime Minister of Iraq (1924–25 and 1935–36)
- Khairi Al-Hindawi, poet
- Maruf al Rusafi, poet
- Arshad al-Salihi, politician
- Mohammed Abdullah al-Shahwani, Iraqi general
- Saadeddin Arkej, politician
- Selim Bayraktar, Turkish actor
- Ahmet bin Carlak, considered the first environmentalist in Turkey and called the "Tarzan of Manisa"
- Kamil Chadirji, Iraqi politician
- Rifat Chadirji, Iraqi architect
- David Chokachi, American actor
- Hijri Dede, poet
- İhsan Doğramacı, founder of Bilkent University and Hacettepe University
- Fuzûlî, 16th century poet, writer and thinker
- Gökböri, leading emir and general
- Amine Gülşe, Swedish model; crowned Miss Turkey (2014) and actress
- Muhammad Sadiq Hassan, Iraqi poet
- İsmet Hürmüzlü, Turkish actor
- Jasim Mohammed Jaafar, Minister for Youth & Sports
- Jijak, mother of the caliph al-Muktafi
- Gökhan Kırdar, Turkish musician
- Khalil Kanna, Iraqi politician during the monarchy era
- Sayyida Zumurrud Khatun, was the mother of Abbasid caliph al-Nasir
- Lütfi Kırdar, Turkish politician
- Nemir Kirdar, billionaire businessman
- Fathi Safwat Kirdar, Iraqi painter and sculptor
- Rena Kirdar, author and socialite
- Üner Kırdar, Turkish diplomat and senior United Nations official
- Hiyam Köprülü, Minister of State in Iraq (2020–present)
- Hidir Lutfi, poet
- Yasemin Mansoor, winner of Miss Germany (1996)
- Reha Muhtar, Turkish television personality
- Talib Mushtaq, poet and diplomat
- Zahra, mother of Al-Mustansir I
- Salih Neftçi, Turkish economist
- Rashad Mandan Omar, Minister of Science and Technology (2003)
- Fahmi Said, army officer
- Amel Senan, actress
- Mehmet Türkmehmet, football player
- Eser West, American actor
- Imad al-Din Zengi, ruler of the Zengid dynasty

== See also ==
- Turkmeneli
- Turkish minorities in the former Ottoman Empire
  - Turks in the Arab world
  - Syrian Turkmen
  - Turks in Lebanon
- Demographics of Iraq
  - Minorities in Iraq
  - Human rights in post-invasion Iraq
- Iraqi Turkmen Front
  - 2009 Taza bombing
  - 16th Turkmen Brigade
- Iraq–Turkey relations

== Bibliography ==
- Al-Hirmizi, Ershad (2003), The Turkmen And Iraqi Homeland (PDF), Kerkuk Vakfi
- Al-Shawi, Ibrahim (2006), A Glimpse of Iraq, Lulu, ISBN 1-4116-9518-6
- Anderson, Liam D.; Stansfield, Gareth R. V. (2009), Crisis in Kirkuk: The Ethnopolitics of Conflict and Compromise, University of Pennsylvania Press, ISBN 978-0-8122-4176-1
- Barker, Geoff (2012), Iraq, Britannica, ISBN 978-1-61535-637-9
- Bayatlı, Hidayet Kemal (1996), İrak Türkmen Türkçesi, Atatürk Kültür, Dil ve Tarih Yüksek Kurumu, p. 329, ISBN 9789751608338
- Betts, Robert Brenton (2013), The Sunni-Shi'a Divide: Islam's Internal Divisions and Their Global Consequences, Potomac books, University of Nebraska Press, ISBN 978-1-61234-522-2
- Boeschoten, Hendrik (1998), "Speakers of Turkic Languages", in Johanson, Lars; Csató, Éva Ágnes (eds.), The Turkic Languages, Routledge
- Bulut, Christiane (2000), "Optative constructions in Iraqi Turkmen", in Göksel, Aslı; Kerslake, Celia (eds.), Studies on Turkish and Turkic Languages, Otto Harrassowitz Verlag, ISBN 3-447-04293-1
- Entessar, Nader (2010), Kurdish Politics in the Middle East, Rowman & Littlefield, ISBN 978-0-7391-4039-0
- Fattah, Hala; Caso, Frank (2009), "Turkish Tribal Migrations and the Early Ottoman State", A Brief History of Iraq, Infobase Publishing, ISBN 978-0-8160-5767-2
- Ghanim, David (2011), Iraq's Dysfunctional Democracy, ABC-CLIO, ISBN 978-0-313-39801-8
- Gunter, Michael M. (2004), "The Kurds in Iraq" (PDF), Middle East Policy, 11 (1): 106–131, doi:10.1111/j.1061-1924.2004.00145.x, archived from the original (PDF) on 23 June 2012
- Graham-Brown, Sarah (1999), Sanctioning Saddam: The Politics of Intervention in Iraq, I.B.Tauris, ISBN 1-86064-473-2
- Güçlü, Yücel (2007), Who Owns Kirkuk? The Turkoman Case (PDF), Middle East Quarterly, Winter 2007
- Hashim, Ahmed (2005), Insurgency and counter-insurgency in Iraq, Cornell University Press, ISBN 0-8014-4452-7
- International Crisis Group (2006), Iraq and the Kurds: The Brewing Battle Over Kirkuk (PDF), International Crisis Group
- International Crisis Group (2008), Turkey and the Iraqi Kurds: Conflict or Cooperation?, International Crisis Group, archived from the original on 12 January 2011
- Jawhar, Raber Tal'at (2010), "The Iraqi Turkmen Front", in Catusse, Myriam; Karam, Karam (eds.), Returning to Political Parties?, Co-éditions, The Lebanese Center for Policy Studies, pp. 313–328, ISBN 9782351592618
- Jenkins, Gareth (2008), Turkey and Northern Iraq: An Overview (PDF), The Jamestown Foundation, archived from the original (PDF) on 12 January 2012
- Johanson, Lars (2001), Discoveries on the Turkic Linguistic Map (PDF), Stockholm: Svenska Forskningsinstitutet i Istanbul
- Johanson, Lars (2009), "Turkmen", in Brown, Keith; Sarah, Ogilvie (eds.), Concise Encyclopedia of Languages of the World, Elsevier, ISBN 978-0-08-087774-7.
- Kibaroğlu, Mustafa; Kibaroğlu, Ayșegül; Halman, Talât Sait (2009), Global security watch Turkey: A reference handbook, Greenwood Publishing Group, ISBN 978-0-313-34560-9
- Kirdar, Nemir (2012), In Pursuit of Fulfilment: Principle Passion Resolve, Hachette, ISBN 978-0-297-86951-1
- Knights, Michael (2004), Operation Iraqi Freedom And The New Iraq: Insights And Forecasts, Washington Institute for Near East Policy, ISBN 0-944029-93-0
- Lukitz, Liora (1995), Iraq: The Search for National Identity, Routledge, ISBN 0-7146-4550-8
- Lukitz, Liora (2006), A quest in the Middle East: Gertrude Bell and the making of modern Iraq, I.B.Tauris, ISBN 1-85043-415-8
- Nakash, Yitzhak (2011), Reaching for Power: The Shi'a in the Modern Arab World, Princeton University Press, ISBN 978-1-4008-4146-2
- Oğuzlu, Tarik H. (2004), "Endangered community:The Turkoman identity in Iraq" (PDF), Journal of Muslim Minority Affairs, 24 (2), Routledge: 313, doi:10.1080/1360200042000296681, hdl:11693/49129, S2CID 56385519
- O'Leary, Brendan (2009), How to get out of Iraq with integrity, University of Pennsylvania Press, ISBN 978-0-8122-4201-0
- Park, Bill (2005), Turkey's policy towards northern Iraq: problems and perspectives, Taylor & Francis, ISBN 0-415-38297-1
- Phillips, David L. (2006), Losing Iraq: Inside the Postwar Reconstruction Fiasco, Basic Books, ISBN 0-465-05681-4
- Rubin, Barry (17 March 2015), The Middle East: A Guide to Politics, Economics, Society and Culture, Routledge, ISBN 978-1-317-45578-3
- Ryan, J. Atticus; Mullen, Christopher A. (1998), Unrepresented Nations and Peoples Organization: Yearbook 1997, Martinus Nijhoff Publishers, ISBN 90-411-1022-4
- Sadik, Giray (2009), American Image in Turkey: U.S. Foreign Policy Dimensions, Rowman & Littlefield, ISBN 978-0-7391-3380-4
- Shanks, Kelsey (2016), Education and Ethno-Politics: Defending Identity in Iraq, Routledge, ISBN 978-1-317-52043-6
- Sirkeci, Ibrahim (2005), Turkmen in Iraq and International Migration of Turkmen (PDF), University of Bristol, archived from the original (PDF) on 3 March 2016
- Stansfield, Gareth R. V. (2007), Iraq: People, History, Politics, Polity, ISBN 978-0-7456-3227-8
- Talabany, Nouri (2007), "Who Owns Kirkuk? The Kurdish Case", Middle East Quarterly, Middle East Quarterly, Winter 2007
- Taylor, Scott (2004), Among the Others: Encounters with the Forgotten Turkmen of Iraq, Esprit de Corps Books, ISBN 1-895896-26-6
- Triana, María (2017), Managing Diversity in Organizations: A Global Perspective, Taylor & Francis, ISBN 978-1-317-42368-3
- Wien, Peter (2014), Iraqi Arab Nationalism: Authoritarian, Totalitarian and Pro-Fascist Inclinations, 1932–1941, Routledge, ISBN 978-1-134-20479-3.
