= Use of chemical weapons in the War in Iraq (2013–2017) =

List of uses of chemical weapons

The map marks the position of reported chemical weapons attacks in the War in Iraq (2013–2017). Yellow markers indicate chlorine attacks. Red indicate a more deadly chemical weapon agent.

Chemical weapon use in the War in Iraq (2013–2017) by IS has been confirmed by the OPCW and US defense officials.

== Incidents ==
=== Reported attacks ===
The table below lists reported chemical weapons attacks in the Iraqi Civil War. (Note: All times given are given in local time unless otherwise stated.)

Date	Location	Governorate	Impact points			Civilian victims		Soldier/militias victims			CW-agent	Notes
Date	Location	Governorate	Time of day	Coordinates	Controlled by	Deaths	Non-fatal	Deaths	Non-fatal	Unit	CW-agent	Notes
21 or 22 June 2015	Mosul Dam	Nineveh			Kurdish forces							A 120-mm mortar shell fired at Peshmerga positions fail to explode.
11 August 2015	Makhmur	Nineveh	Tuesday night		Kurdish forces				Around 60 affected, 4 seriously.	Peshmerga	Mustard gas	According to Peshmerga officials, around 45 120-mm mortar shells were launched on Peshmerga positions. Confirmed by US defense officials.
11 August 2015	Makhmur	Nineveh	Tuesday afternoon		Kurdish forces					Peshmerga	Chlorine	Katyusha rockets were launched on Peshmerga positions.
12 August 2015	Sultan Abdullah	Nineveh	Wednesday night		Kurdish forces					Peshmerga	Possibly Mustard gas	45 shells were launched on Peshmerga positions.
11 February 2016	Sinjar	Nineveh	Thursday, between 1500–1600	200 meters behind the front line south of Sinjar. 36.26097487°N 41.82214949°E	Kurdish forces			-	30 affected, 9 seriously.	The 8th Peshmerga brigade	Possibly Chlorine	IS militants reportedly fired 30 81mm mortar shells believed to have been filled with chlorine, at Kurdish troops.
8 March 2016	Taza Khurmatu	Kirkuk	Late Tuesday and early Wednesday 9 March		Kurdish forces	1	Some 400 were exposed, around 200 were injured, 16 seriously.				Possibly Mustard gas	24 shells and rockets were fired into the village from IS positions in the nearby Bashir area. A two or three-year-old girl wounded in the attack died on Friday 11 March.
12 March 2016	Taza Khurmatu	Kirkuk	Early Saturday		Kurdish forces		Unclear. (Note: The two attacks in Taza, the one on 8-9 March and the one on 12 March, were reportedly wounding around 600. 670 according to a statement made by the Iraqi Turkmen Front.)				Possibly Mustard gas	According to Iraqi security and hospital officials, chemical rockets were fired into a residential part of Taza.
6 March 2017	Mosul	Nineveh	Monday		Iraqi Security Forces	4 killed	25 wounded				Unclear	

=== Confirmed attacks ===
After around 35 Kurdish soldiers were injured during fighting against Islamic State militants southwest of Erbil in August 2015, samples were taken by OPCW in an investigation directed by the Iraqi government. In February 2016, a source at the OPCW confirmed that the samples tested positive for mustard gas.

== See also ==
- Use of chemical weapons in the Syrian civil war
- Iraq and weapons of mass destruction
- Iraqi chemical weapons program
