= Kirdar =

Kirdar (from Persian: کردار, "deed") is a surname.

It originally refers to the prominent Iraqi Turkmen Kirdar family, from the city of Kirkuk.

Notable people with the surname are as follows:

- Birkan Kirdar (born 2002), Australian association football player
- Gökhan Kırdar (born 1970), Turkish musician
- Gözde Kırdar (born 1985), Turkish female volleyball player
- Lütfi Kırdar (1887–1961), Turkish politician
- Nemir Kirdar (1936–2020), Iraqi businessman
- Özge Kırdar (born 1985), Turkish female volleyballer
- Rena Kirdar Sindi (born 1969), Iraqi author
- Üner Kirdar (born 1933), Turkish author and United Nations official
