= Iraqi Genocide (disambiguation) =

Iraqi Genocide redirects to Casualties of the Iraq War, Allied-American Invasion in 2003

It may also refer to:

- War in Iraq (2013–2017)
  - Yezidi genocide
  - Iraqi Turkmen genocide
  - Mass executions in Islamic State-occupied Mosul
  - Persecution of Christians by the Islamic State
  - Persecution of Shias by the Islamic State
  - Use of chemical weapons in the War in Iraq (2013–2017)
- Iraqi Kurdish Civil War
  - 1996 Erbil massacre
