= Turkmeneli =

Political term for the region with an Iraqi Turkmen presence

Coordinates: 35°12′04″N 43°57′54″E

Turkmeneli (Turkish: Türkmeneli, lit. 'Land of the Turkmens'), also known as Turkmenland, and historically as Turcomania and East Turkmeneli (Doğu Türkmeneli), is a geopolitical term used to define the vast swath of territory in which the Iraqi Turkmens inhabit. The term incorporates the Iraqi Turkmen settlements running from Iraq's border with Turkey and Syria and diagonally down the country to the border with Iran. It is sometimes referred to as East Turkmeneli to distinguish from the Syrian Turkmen homeland, known as West Turkmeneli. Apart from the designation of the region as Turcomania in a 1785 map by William Guthrie, there's no certain mention of the region in published works until the establishment of the Iraqi Turkmen Front. Furthermore, ITF maps of Turkmeneli were often controversial and exaggerated.

The Turkmens consider the capital of Turkmeneli to be in the city of Kirkuk and its boundaries also include Tal Afar, Mosul, Erbil, Mandali, and Tuz Khurmatu. According to Liam Anderson and Gareth Stansfield, the Turkmens note that the term Turcomania an Anglicized version of Turkmeneli — appears on maps published by William Guthrie and Adolf Stieler

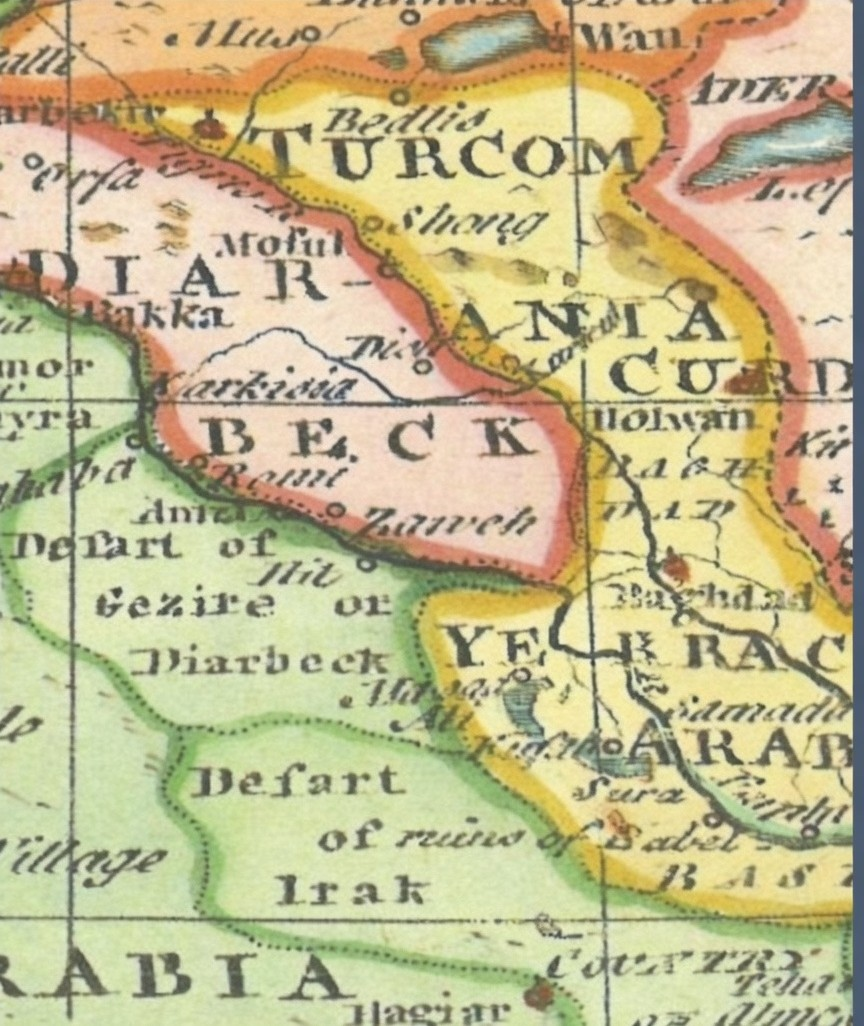
Magnified map of William Guthrie's Turcomania showing Kirkuk

== The Turkmen homeland ==
The Iraqi Turkmens count the cities of Mosul, Erbil, Kirkuk, Tuz Khurmatu, Altun Kupri, Kifri, Khanaqin, Sadiya, Mendeli, Baqubah, and Tikrit as part of Turkmeneli.

Samarra has historically had a large Turkmen population which were among the earliest settlers in the city.

== Flag of Turkmeneli ==
Flag of Turkmeneli
- Gök Bayrak
- Use: Ethnic national flag
- Proportion: 2:3
- Adopted: 1994. Although it was adopted in 1994 Officially, The flag existed and saw a lesser extent before 1994.
- Design: A sky blue field charged with a white crescent and star slightly left of center, flanked by two horizontal white stripes.

The flag of Turkmeneli is a sky blue banner, featuring a central white crescent and star, flanked above and below by two narrow horizontal white stripes. It is used as the ethnic and political symbol of the Iraqi Turkmen community.

The sky blue color, known as gök mavisi in Turkmen, symbolizes the Turkic heritage. While there is no fixed shade, the hexadecimal color #52B5F7 is widely used. The crescent and star are common symbols in Turkic and Islamic iconography, representing cultural and religious heritage. The two horizontal white lines are interpreted as symbolic representation of the region on which Turkic peoples inhabit between the Danube River in Austria (the maximum extent of the Ottoman Empire) to the Great Wall of China.

== Prospects of an autonomous region ==
According to Khalil Osman there has been "a raft of federalist schemes" proposed by various Turkmen political parties. For example, one controversial proposal to set up Turkmeneli as a Turkmen autonomous region included the areas northwest of Iraq, from Tal Afar in Nineveh Governorate, through Kirkuk Governorate and Tuz Khurmatu District in Saladin Governorate in north-central Iraq, to Mandali in the Diyala Governorate in the northeast of Baghdad. Martin van Bruinessen added that the Turkmen in Kirkuk always had an understandable fear of being submerged by the Kurds, although the larger claims of some Turkmen, which included the entire region spanning beyond Kirkuk, had only emerged later, and were probably a response to the establishment of the KRG.

Vahram Petrosian suggests that the Iraqi Turkmen Front's (ITF) forwarding of the idea of the recognition of Turkmeneli may pave the way for a future Kurdish-Turkmen conflict.

In 2016 Wassim Bassem reported that the Turkmen have been calling for their own independent province in the Tal Afar district. Their demands had coincided with calls for the establishment of other new provinces for the Christian and the Yazidi minorities.

On 17 July 2017, Turkmen representatives proposed that Tal Afar and Tuz Khurmatu become an autonomous Turkmen region and asked for a "special status" for Kirkuk at a summit in Baghdad under the name "Future of Turkmens in United Iraq". They also called for "training and equipping the Turkmen Hashd al-Shaabi forces."

== Independence movement ==
Pan-Turkists advocated for Iraqi Turkmen to separate from Iraq and form East Turkmeneli, and for Syrian Turkmen to separate from Syria and form West Turkmeneli, which would both unite and form the State of Turkmeneli, which would be a prerequisite for Pan-Turkism.

After the dissolution of the Ottoman Empire, the Turkmen did not want to be part of Iraq and wanted to be part of Turkey. The Turkmen elites detested the idea of going from the Ottoman ruling class to a marginalized minority. The Turkmen elites "had a hard time reconciling with the fact that the Mosul-Kirkuk region would never be part of Turkey. For them, Iraq was just a make-believe state founded by the 'merciless infidel (gavur)' (the British) and his Arab collaborators who were 'too inept to run a state on their own.'" Turkmen nationalists stated that "there is no such thing as the state of Iraq for our grandfathers" and that "there is the Turkish State and there is the Iraqi State. I did not found it, but have to live with it, just as people diagnosed with cancer have to live with it!"

Iraqi Turkmen nationalists were divided between those who wanted to join Turkey and those who wanted an independent Turkmeneli. Iraqi Turkmen nationalists advocated for a Turkmeneli stretching from Tal Afar to Mandali, with its capital in Kirkuk. Many Iraqi Turkmen expressed hope that Turkmeneli, especially Mosul and Kirkuk, would become part of Turkey.

== Gallery ==
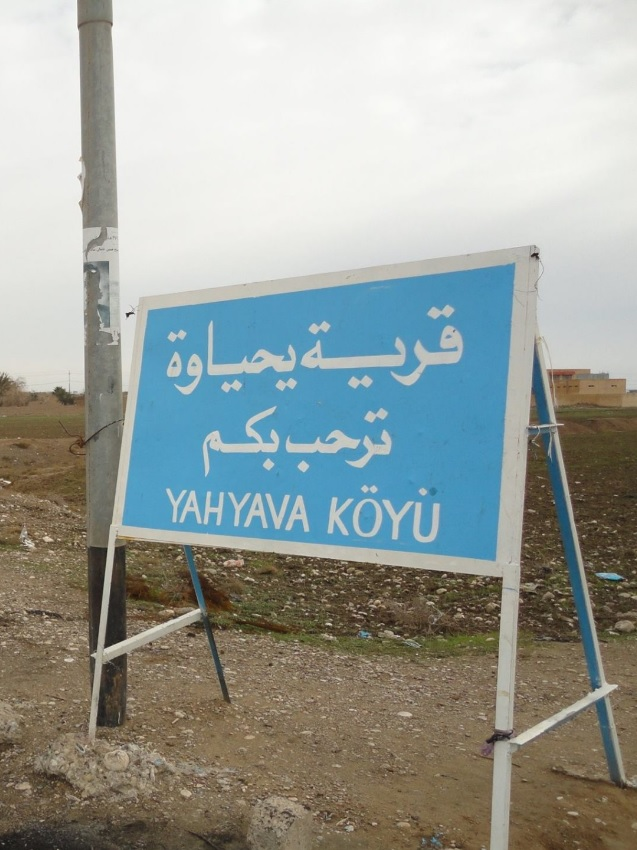
Bilingual sign in Arabic and Turkish

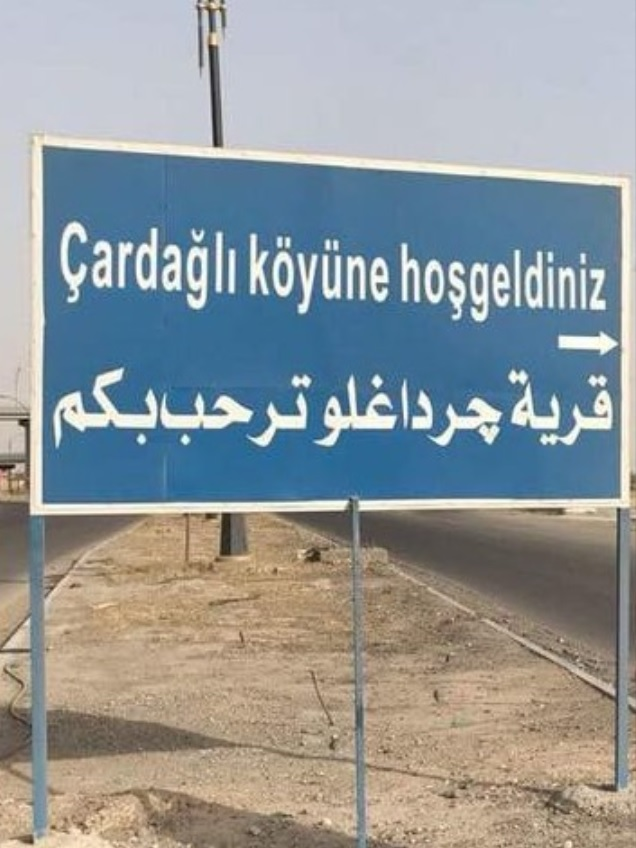
Bilingual sign in Arabic and Turkish

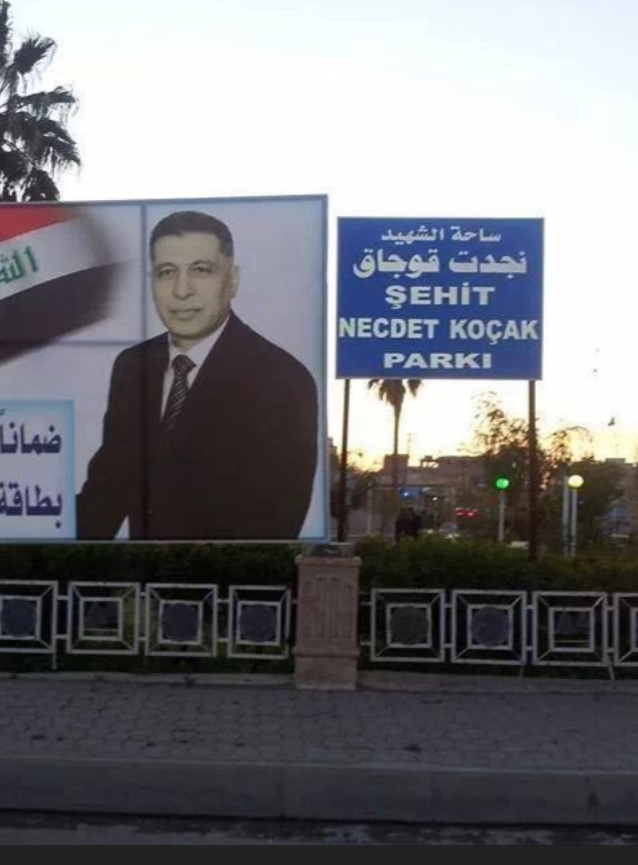
Bilingual sign in Arabic and Turkish

== See also ==
- Iraqi Turkmen Front
- Türkmeneli TV
- Flag of Turkmeneli

== Bibliography ==
- Anderson, Liam; Stansfield, Gareth (2009), Crisis in Kirkuk: The Ethnopolitics of Conflict and Compromise, University of Pennsylvania Press, ISBN 978-0812206043
- Oğuzlu, Tarik H. (2004), "Endangered community: the Turkoman identity in Iraq", Journal of Muslim Minority Affairs, 24 (2), Routledge: 309–325, doi:10.1080/1360200042000296681, hdl:11693/49129, S2CID 56385519
- Osman, Khalil (2015), Sectarianism in Iraq: The Making of State and Nation Since 1920, Routledge, ISBN 978-1317674870
- Petrosian, Vahram (2003), "The Iraqi Turkomans and Turkey", Iran & the Caucasus, 7 (1/2), Brill Publishers: 279–308, doi:10.1163/157338403X00150
- Rich, Paul J. (2008), Iraq and Rupert Hay's Two Years in Kurdistan, Lexington Books, ISBN 978-1461633679
- Strakes, Jason E. (2009), "Current Political Complexities of the Iraqi Turkmen", Iran & the Caucasus, 13 (2), Brill Publishers: 365–382, doi:10.1163/157338410X12625876281505
