= Taza Khurmatu =

Taza Khurmatu Taza
- Town
- Location within Iraq
- Coordinates: 35°18′10″N 44°19′43″E
- Country: Iraq
- Governorate: Kirkuk
- District: Kirkuk

Population (2024)
  - Total: 21,788
- Time zone: UTC+3

Taza Khurmatu or Taza (Arabic: تازة خورماتو, romanized: Tāzah Ḵūrmātū, Turkish: Tazehurmatu, lit. 'Fresh Dates') is a town in Iraq, located south of Kirkuk. It is populated predominantly by Shia Turkmen.

== History ==
In 1925, the town's population was predominantly Turkmen.

The town experienced Arabization during the Saddam era where Turkmen land was confiscated and given to Arab settlers.

In 2009 it was the site of the 20 June 2009 Taza bombing, where more than 70 people were killed by a suicide bomber. In June 2014, along with the nearby villages of Brawawchli, Karanaz, Chardaghli, and Bashir, it experienced a massacre of at least 40 villagers committed by the Islamic State in Iraq and the Levant. In March 2016, the Islamic State of Iraq and the Levant fired mortars containing an unidentified chemical agent killing one and injuring 600.

It is currently controlled by the Turkmen Brigades of the Popular Mobilization Units.
