= Türkmeneli TV =

- Broadcast area: Middle East
- Network: Iraq
- Headquarters: Kirkuk, Iraq

Programming
- Languages: Turkish and Arabic
- Picture format: HdTV

History
- Launched: 2004

Links
- Website: Official Website

Türkmeneli Televizyonu, or simply Türkmeneli TV, is a television station in Iraq which broadcasts the interests of the Iraqi Turkmen community. It is available on two satellites: Turksat and Nilesat, and broadcasts in the Turkish and Arabic languages. The channel produces a variety of programmes, such as news, documentaries on Iraqi Turkmen history (particularly Ottoman history), language, politics, and music, including programmes such as Türkmen Havası directed by Aslan Şehit.

Based in Kirkuk, Türkmeneli TV started its test broadcast in April 2004 and its actual broadcast in July 2004. By 2010, Türkmeneli TV opened another studio in Baghdad.

In 2008, Türkmeneli TV signed a protocol with the Turkish Radio and Television Corporation (TRT), allowing the station to broadcast sequences and music programs from TRT. Moreover, Türkmeneli TV has also signed agreements with other Turkish channels, such as with TGRT and ATV, and the Northern Cyprus broadcaster Bayrak Radyo Televizyon Kurumu (BRT) to share documentaries.

As of 2012, Türkmeneli TV has studios in Kirkuk and Baghdad in Iraq, and in Ankara in Turkey.

== See also ==
- Turkmeneli ("land of the Iraqi Turkmen")
- Television in Iraq
- List of Turkish television channels
