= Muhammad Sadiq Hassan =

Mohammed Sadiq Hassan
- محمد صادق حسن
- Born: 1886; Kirkuk, Ottoman Iraq
- Died: July 1, 1967 (aged 80–81); Kirkuk, Iraq
- Occupations: poet, teacher and writer

Mohammed Sadiq Hassan 'Awni Effendi (1886 – 1 July 1967) was an Iraqi polyglot poet and writer. Born in Kirkuk to a Turkmen-Arab family, he studied and learned Arabic, Persian, Turkish and Kurdish. He joined the Military Academy in Istanbul and graduated with the rank of second lieutenant, then was appointed to the Ottoman army and contributed to wars, such as the Siege of Kut and other action during World War I. After the war, he was appointed to positions in education and left the army to work in the teaching of religious Islamic sciences at the Khangah Mosque. He wrote poetry in Turkish, Persian, and Arabic, but his best poetry was written in Turkish. He published his poetry in Iraqi newspapers and other local newspapers in Kirkuk, his hometown. Some of his printed books are The World War Memories (1925), My Reflections (1956) and The Passionate Sensations (1964), many of his poems were translated into Arabic. He died in Husam al-Din Mosque in central Kirkuk.

== Poetry ==
Muhammad Sadiq wrote for many purposes and was famous for ghazal, nationalism, lamentation and divinities. In his youth, he loved a girl but did not last long because the girl died and this effect affected by her youth poetry. He wrote in Turkish, Arabic, Kurdish, and Persian and combined this languages in his "Mal'amah" poem. He wrote a large number of Gnostic ruba'iyat known as "Khuwairat". He visited Baghdad from time to time and met with Rasafi, Zahawi and others.
