= Human development (economics) =

Concept in economics

The concept of human development expands upon the notion of economic development to include social, political and even ethical dimensions. Since the mid-twentieth century, international organisations such as the United Nations and the World Bank have adopted human development as a holistic approach to evaluate a country’s progress that considers living conditions, social relations, individual freedoms and political institutions that contribute to freedom and well-being, in addition to standard measures of income growth.

The United Nations Development Programme defines human development as "the process of enlarging people's choices", such choices allowing people to "lead a long and healthy life, to get educated, to enjoy a decent standard of living", as well as "political freedom, other guaranteed human rights and various ingredients of self-respect". Thus, human development is about much more than economic growth, which is only a means of enlarging people's choices. Some organizations, such as the Catholic Church and the Organization of American States, use the term "integral development" to reflect something wider than "economic" development.

== History ==
Human Development has roots in ancient philosophy and early economic theory. Aristotle noted that "Wealth is evidently not the good we are seeking, for it is merely useful for something else", and Adam Smith and Karl Marx were concerned with human capabilities. The theory grew in importance in the 1980s with the work of Amartya Sen and his Human Capabilities perspective, which played a role in his receiving the 1998 Nobel Prize in Economics. Notable early active economists who formulated the modern concept of human development theory were Mahbub ul Haq, Üner Kirdar, and Amartya Sen. The Human Development Index developed for the United Nations Development Programme (UNDP) stems from this early research. In 2000, Sen and Sudhir Anand published a notable development of the theory to address issues in sustainability.

Martha Nussbaum's publications in the late 1990s and 2000s pushed theorists to pay more attention to the human in the theory, and particularly to human emotion. A separate approach stems in part from needs theories of psychology which in part started with Abraham Maslow (1968). Representative of these are the Human-Scale Development approach developed by Manfred Max-Neef in the mid-to-late 1980s which addresses human needs and satisfiers which are more or less static across time and context.

Anthropologists and sociologists have also challenged perspectives on Human Development Theory that stem from neoclassical economics. Examples of scholars include, Diane Elson, Raymond Apthorpe, Irene van Staveren, and Ananta Giri. Elson (1997) proposes that human development should move towards a more diverse approach to individual incentives. This will involve a shift from seeing people as agents in control of their choices selecting from a set of possibilities utilizing human capital as one of many assets. Instead, theorists should see people as having more mutable choices influenced by social structures and changeable capacities and using a humanistic approach to theory including factors relating to an individual's culture, age, gender, and family roles. These extensions express a dynamic approach to the theory, a dynamism that has been advocated by Ul Haq and Sen, in spite of the implicit criticism of those two figures.

In an attempt to promote human development, the United Nations supports decennial Earth Summits where UN members discuss a plan of action called Agenda 21 – an agenda to make sure humanity will still be around after the year 2100. Thousands of cities now have a local Agenda 21 and more and more companies and organisations also align their strategic plan with the strategic plan of Agenda21. With the approaching of the year 2000, UN Secretary General Kofi Annan was compelled to develop something that existed in the private sector: setting out a long term plan, a mid term plan and a short term planning. This endeavour supports on Agenda21 and was named the Millennium Development Goals (MDGs) which ran from 2000–2015. The United Nations made a commitment to accomplish these goals by 2015 and thus make an attempt to promote human development. As the experience of this exercise was perceived successful, a follow-up program was developed and named as the Sustainable Development Goals (SDGs).

== Measurements of human development ==
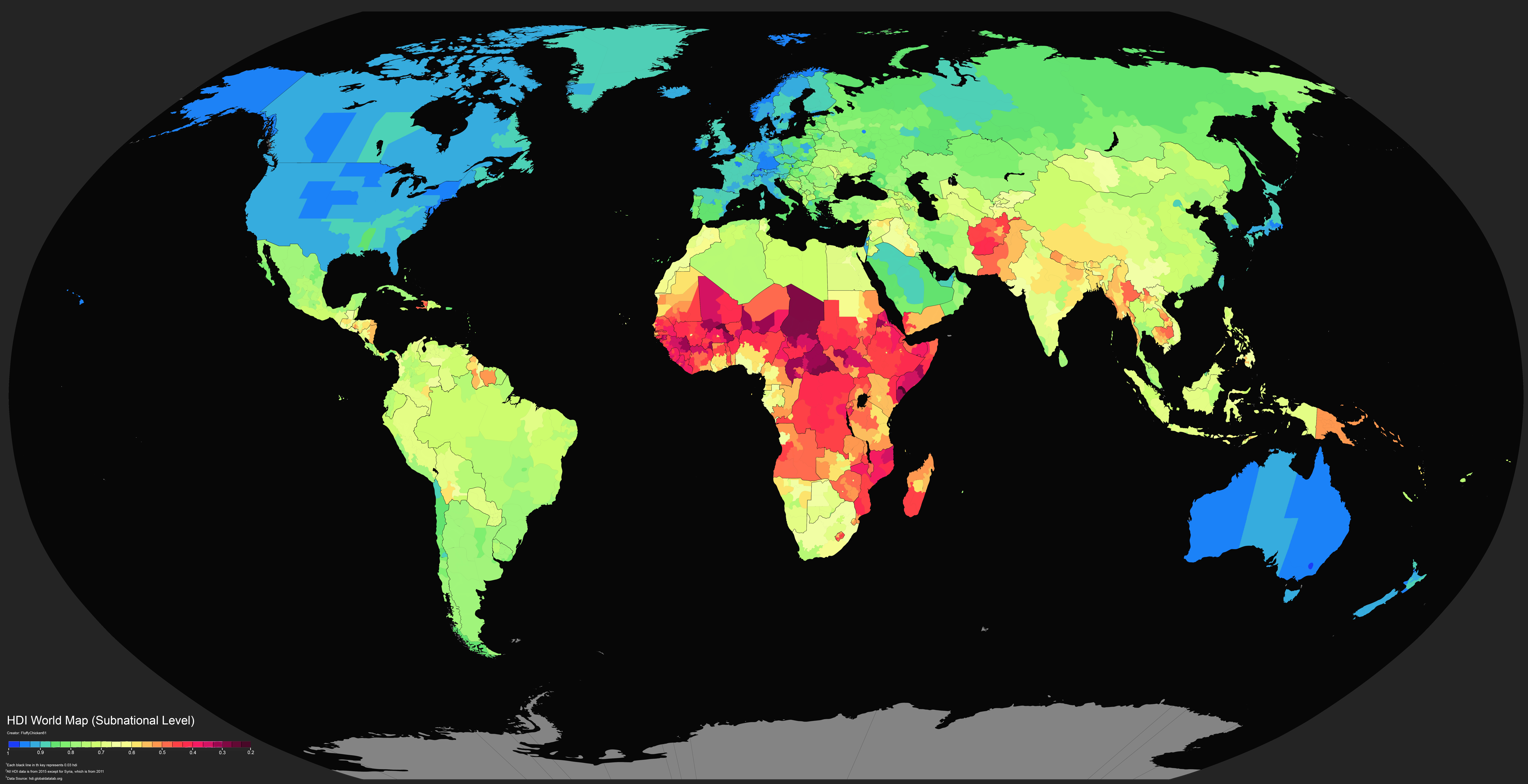
World map of subnational HDI (2018)

There are six basic pillars of human development: equity, sustainability, productivity, empowerment, cooperation and security.

- Equity is the idea of fairness for every person, between men and women; we each have the right to education and health care.
- Sustainability is the view that we all have the right to earn a living that can sustain our lives and have access to a more even distribution of goods.
- Productivity states the full participation of people in the process of income generation. This also means that the government needs more efficient social programs for its people.
- Empowerment is the freedom of the people to influence development and decisions that affect their lives.
- Cooperation stimulates participation and belonging to communities and groups as a means of mutual enrichment and a source of social meaning.
- Security offers people development opportunities freely and safely with confidence that they will not disappear suddenly in the future.

=== Human Development Report ===
The Global Human Development Reports (HDR) is an annual publication released by the UNDP's Human Development Report Office and contains the Human Development Index. Within global HDR there are four main indexes: Human Development Index, Gender-related Development Index, Gender Empowerment Measure and the Human Poverty Index. There are not only a global Human Development Reports but there are also regional and national reports. The Regional, National and subnational (for portions of countries) HDRs take various approaches, according to the strategic thinking of the individual authorship groups that craft the individual reports. In the United States, for example, Measure of America has been publishing human development reports since 2008 with a modified index, the human development index American Human Development Index, which measures the same three basic dimensions but uses slightly different indicators to better reflect the U.S. context and to maximize use of available data.

The Human Development Index is a way for people and nations to see the policy flaws of regions and countries. Although the releasing of this information is believed to encourage countries to alter their policies, there is no evidence demonstrating changes nor is there any motivation for countries to do so.

=== Human Development Index ===
HDI trends: OECD Central and Eastern Europe, and the CIS Latin America and the Caribbean East Asia / Arab States South Asia Sub-Saharan Africa

The Human Development Index (HDI) is the normalized measure of life expectancy, education and per capita income for countries worldwide. It is an improved standard means of measuring well-being, especially child welfare and thus human development. Although this index makes an effort to simplify human development, it is much more complex than any index or set of indicators.

The 2007 report showed a small increase in world HDI in comparison with the previous year's report. This rise was fueled by a general improvement in the developing world, especially of the least developed countries group. This marked improvement at the bottom was offset with a decrease in HDI of high income countries.

=== Human Poverty Index ===
To reflect gaps in the Human Development Index, the United Nations came out with the Human Poverty Index (HPI) in 1997. The HPI measures the deficiencies in the three indexes of the human development index: long and healthy life, knowledge and a decent standard of living. The HPI was meant to provide a broader view of human development and is adapted to developed countries to reveal social exclusion. The index has subsequently been replaced by the Multidimensional Poverty Index

=== Social Progress Index ===
The Social Progress Index is published by the non-profit Social Progress Imperative. It combines indicators related to social welfare, equality, personal freedom and sustainability.

=== Augmented Human Development Index ===
Leandro Prados de la Escosura has an alternative dataset for human development, which he calls the Augmented Human Development Index.

== Educational development ==
The 2030 Agenda for Sustainable Development, adopted by the United Nations (UN) General Assembly in September 2015, calls for a new vision to address the environmental, social and economic concerns facing the world today. The Agenda includes 17 Sustainable Development Goals (SDGs), including SDG 4 on education. The United Nations Educational, Scientific and Cultural Organization is leading SDG 4, covering all aspects of education. Through initiatives, projects, conventions and events, UNESCO addresses issues related to education and shapes its future. The UN agency has established the Convention against Discrimination in Education, the Convention on Higher Education Qualifications and the Futures of Education initiative. In September 2022, the Transformation Education Summit sounded the alarm on the need for global solutions. On this occasion, UNESCO published a report on a "new social contract for education", calling for a "peaceful, just and sustainable" future and underlining the importance of education in profound societal changes.

Since 1909, the percentage of children in the developing world attending school has increased. Before then, a small minority of boys attended school. By the start of the twenty-first century, the majority of children in most regions of the world attended some form of school. By 2016, over 91 percent of children are enrolled in formal primary schooling. However, a learning crisis has emerged across the globe, due to the fact that a large proportion of students enrolled in school are not learning. A World Bank study found that "53 percent of children in low- and middle-income countries cannot read and understand a simple story by the end of primary school." While schooling has increased rapidly over the last few decades, learning has not followed suit.

Universal Primary Education was one of the eight international Millennium Development Goals, towards which progress has been made in the past decade, though barriers still remain. Securing charitable funding from prospective donors is one particularly persistent problem. Researchers at the Overseas Development Institute have indicated that the main obstacles to funding for education include conflicting donor priorities, an immature aid architecture, and a lack of evidence and advocacy for the issue. Additionally, Transparency International has identified corruption in the education sector as a major stumbling block to achieving Universal Primary Education in Africa. Furthermore, demand in the developing world for improved educational access is not as high as foreigners have expected. Indigenous governments are reluctant to take on the ongoing costs involved. There is also economic pressure from some parents, who prefer their children to earn money in the short term rather than work towards the long-term benefits of education.

A study conducted by the UNESCO International Institute for Educational Planning indicates that stronger capacities in educational planning and management may have an important spill-over effect on the system as a whole. Sustainable capacity development requires complex interventions at the institutional, organizational and individual levels that could be based on some foundational principles:

- national leadership and ownership should be the touchstone of any intervention;
- strategies must be context relevant and context specific;
- plans should employ an integrated set of complementary interventions, though implementation may need to proceed in steps;
- partners should commit to a long-term investment in capacity development while working towards some short-term achievements;
- outside intervention should be conditional on an impact assessment of national capacities at various levels;
- a certain percentage of students should be removed for improvisation of academics (usually practiced in schools, after tenth grade).

== See also ==
- Human security
- International development
- Progress
- Social change
