= 2009 Taza bombing =

Mass murder in Iraq

20 June 2009 Taza bombing
- The attack occurred in Taza, Iraq.
- Location: 35°18′12″N 44°19′51″E; Taza, Iraq
- Date: 20 June 2009
- Target: Shia Muslims
- Attack type: Suicide attack (Remote detonation possible)
- Weapon: Explosives
- Deaths: 73
- Injuries: 254
- Perpetrator: Unknown
- Motive: Anti-Shi'a sentiment

The 20 June 2009 Taza bombing was an attack which took place in Taza near Kirkuk, Iraq on 20 June 2009 in a dominant Shia Turkmen community. At least 73 people were killed and over 200 more were injured. Thirty homes were destroyed in the bombing.

The bombing was the worst attack in Iraq since March 2008, even worse than the twin 23 April 2009 Iraqi suicide attacks in Baghdad and Muqdadiyah.

== Incident ==
The attack took place in a residential area near a mosque, as a result destroying several homes and slightly damaging the mosque. Mud-brick homes in the vicinity of the explosion collapsed, with the explosion leaving a deep crater at the point of detonation.

Following midday prayers, people were exiting the crowded Al-Rasoul mosque in Taza town when the explosion occurred. Those who were affected were removed to Azadi Hospital in Kirkuk, with children being placed in wards. Thirty-five-year-old Hussain Nashaat was wrapped in bandages when he spoke to reporters: "I was sitting in my house when suddenly a powerful blast shook the ground under me. I found myself covered in blood and ran outside in a daze. My lovely neighborhood was just rubble." People were buried alive.

Shortly after the bombing, the Kurdistan Regional Government, under orders from the Iraqi ministry of defence, started a 15-day operation "to follow terrorists and criminals in Kirkuk Province surroundings". 13 days later a high-ranking officer reported that "during a joint raid by Iraqi military forces alongside US troops in Haweja town, Mahdi Salih a terrorist was arrested who was the Kirkuk two blasts mastermind on 20 June"

In December, Adnan Jassim Ali al-Hamdani, Walid Mahmoud Mohammed al-Hamdani and Hawas Falah al-Juburi were convicted and sentenced to death for helping to plan the attack.

== Perpetrators ==
Perpetrators are not identified. Western media, like Reuters, hinted at “...Sunni Islamist insurgents, including al Qaeda...”.

== Reaction ==
- Iraqi Prime Minister Nouri al-Maliki called the bombing an "ugly crime" which was "an attempt to harm security and stability and spread mistrust of the Iraqi forces".
- the Kurdistan Regional Government president Massoud Barzani condemned the bombings by saying: this coward act aims to disturb fraternity, peace and peaceful coexistence among the various constituents in Iraq and we for our part strongly condemn this criminal act.
- Turkey's Foreign Ministry criticised the bombing and issued a statement expressing "profound sorrow". The statement said: "Turkey attaches great importance to the efforts to ensure peace and stability in Iraq and to provide a peaceful atmosphere among different ethnic and religious groups in Kirkuk. We strongly condemn this heinous attack. We want to reiterate once again that Turkey is opposed to all kinds of terrorism and the Turkish people sympathize with Iraqi people who lost their beloved ones in the attack. We are ready to take in those who were injured in the attack for medical treatment. We are taking all kinds of measures including dispatch of an ambulance helicopter to Iraq."
- The Turkmen Front announced three days of mourning and called for an "immediate investigation... and for the criminals to be brought to justice".
