= Mehmet Türkmehmet =

Iraqi footballer

Personal information
- Full name: Mehmet Türkmehmet
- Date of birth: 18 October 1980 (age 46)
- Place of birth: Kirkuk, Iraq
- Height: 1.80 m (5 ft 11 in)
- Position: Midfielder

Team information
- Current team: Karşıyaka
- Number: 11

Senior career*
Years	Team	Apps	(Gls)
1999–2004	Ankaragücü	51	(2)
2000–2001	→ Keskinspor (loan)		
2004–2005	Denizlispor	12	(0)
2005–2006	Bursaspor		
2006–2007	Eskişehirspor		
2007–2008	Elazığspor	1	(0)
2008	Kartalspor	6	(0)
2009	Diyarbakırspor	4	(0)
2009–2011	Kayseri Erciyesspor	33	(1)
2011–2012	Şanlıurfaspor	45	(7)
2012–	Karşıyaka	3	(0)
- * Club domestic league appearances and goals as of 31 October 2012 (UTC)

Mehmet Türkmehmet (born 18 October 1980 in Kirkuk, Iraq) is an Iraqi professional football midfielder.

He currently plays for Karşıyaka S.K. in the TFF First League.
