= Sultan Abdullah, Iraq =

Sultan Abdullah
- Village
- Location in Iraq
- Coordinates: 35°52′46″N 43°23′18″E
- Country: Iraq
- Governorate: Nineveh
- District: Mosul
- Time zone: UTC+3 (AST)

Sultan Abdullah is a village in Iraq 54 kilometers (34 mi) south-southeast of Mosul. It is part of Mosul District in Nineveh Governorate.
