= Talib Mushtaq =

Talib Mushtaq (1900–?) was a politician and Arab nationalist in Iraq during the 1930s.

Mushtaq was born in Kadhimiya, Iraq, in 1900. His father was an Ottoman official of Turkish origin. When the First World War began, Mushtaq tried to enter the Ottoman army but was rejected due to his young age. Once Britain occupied Iraq, Mushtaq fled to northern Iraq with his family where they settled in Kirkuk. Mushtaq was sent to İzmit, Turkey, where he was entered into a boarding school. Once the Ottomans were defeated in the war, Mushtaq took part in Turkish nationalist rallies in Istanbul against the Greek invasion and gave a speech to the public where he called for the independence of İzmir. He returned to Iraq due to economic reasons when he sought financial support from Sherif Husain, a representative that encouraged Iraqi's in Istanbul to return to Iraq. After arriving in Iraq Mushtaq embraced Arab nationalism and engaged in nationalist activities during the 1920s and became the Director of Education in Basra.

The historian C. Ernest Dawn refers to him as "an Iraqi-Arab bureaucrat-politician whose long career began in Ottoman times."
