= Bashir, Iraq =

Bashir
- Village
- Location in Iraq
- Coordinates: 35°14′47″N 44°16′33″E
- Country: Iraq
- Governorate: Kirkuk Governorate
- District: Kirkuk District

Bashir (Arabic: قرية بشير, romanized: Bašīr, Turkish: Beşir) is a village in Iraq, located south of Kirkuk. It is populated by Shia Turkmens.

The village was captured by ISIL in June 2014. It was recaptured by Iraqi forces on 1 May 2016.

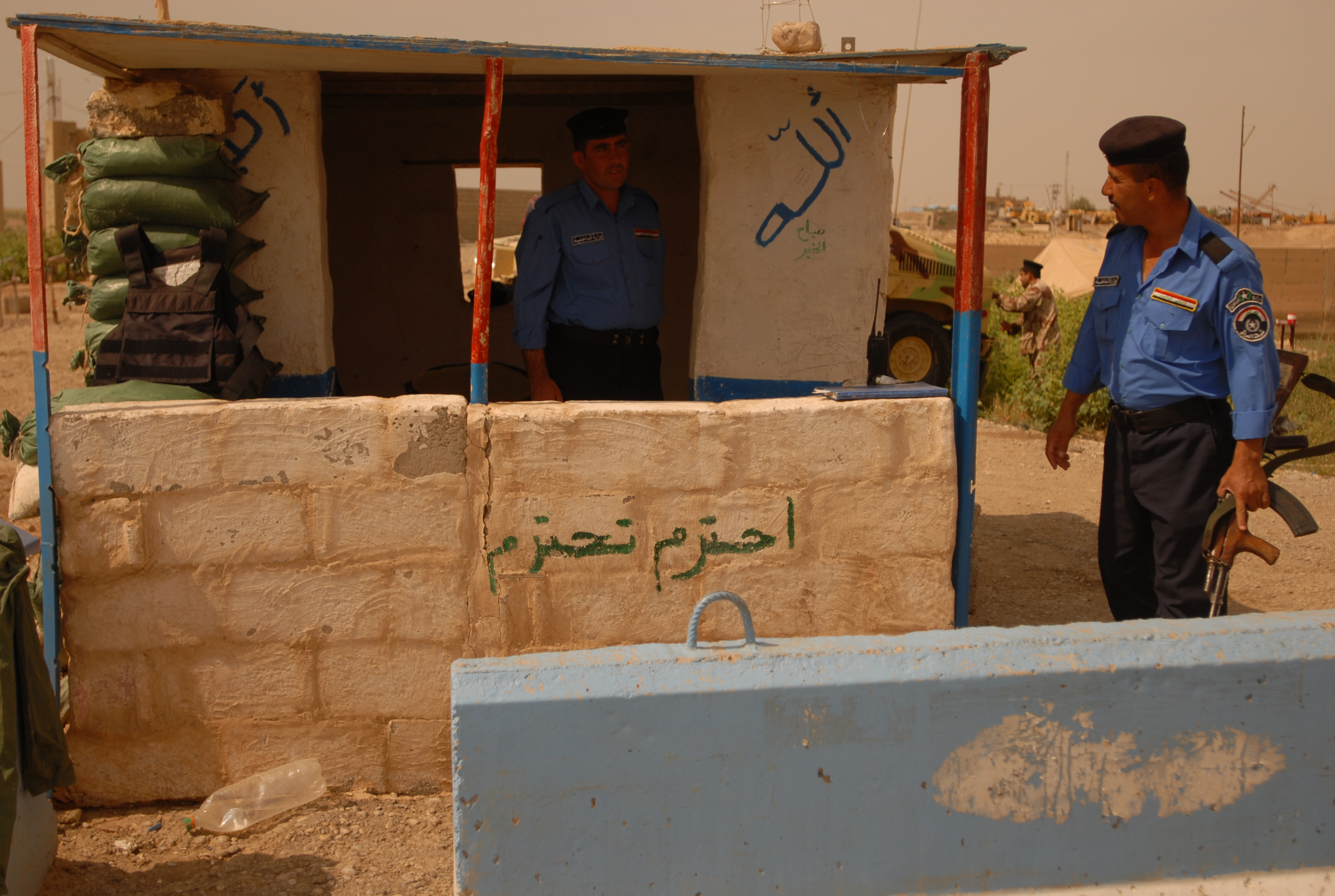
Policemen from the Bashir Police Station, man a checkpoint outside of the city, Sept. 21, during a time traditionally known as Bayram, where Turkmen in the community celebrate the end of Ramadan for three days. Policemen at the station increased security during the celebration to ensure the safety of the city's residents.
