= Üner Kırdar =

Turkish diplomat and statesperson (1933–2026)

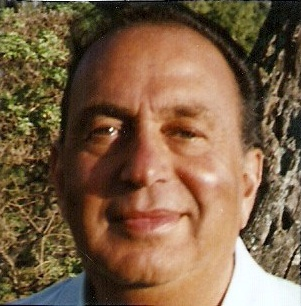
- Born: 1 January 1933 (age 93); İzmir, Turkey
- Died: 2 April 2026

Academic background
- Education: Istanbul University Law School; London School of Economics; Jesus College, Cambridge

Academic work
- Discipline: Economics, Human development theory

Üner Kırdar (1 January 1933−2 April 2026) was a noted author on international development issues, retired Turkish diplomat and senior United Nations official. He is one of the early pioneers of human development theory and, since the mid-1980s, has advocated and worked for the concept’s worldwide adoption.

Beginning in the late 1970s, Kırdar co-authored a series of volumes articulating the key themes and debates emerging from the Society for International Development’s North South Roundtables. This series of expert group meetings involved a cross-section of leading international development experts, policy-makers and practitioners. The publications from these meetings were the foundation for the development and launch of Human development theory and, subsequently, the United Nations Development Programme’s (UNDP) Human Development Report.

Through his extensive writings, lectures and initiatives, including his establishment of UNDP’s Development Study Programme, Kırdar’s 40-year career has been dedicated to promoting the insight and the practical application of international development concepts, including a focus on how international cooperation can help better the human condition.

== Education ==
Born in İzmir, Turkey on 1 January 1933, Kırdar completed his high-school studies at Galatasaray High School and graduated from the Faculty of Law, Istanbul University. He completed his post-graduate studies at the London School of Economics and received his Doctorate in International Economics and Law from Jesus College, Cambridge, in England (1962).

== Professional career ==
Kırdar has held senior positions in the Turkish Ministry of Foreign Affairs (1957-1972), including serving as Director for International Economic Organizations, Deputy Permanent Representative of the Republic of Turkey to the United Nations Office at Geneva. He represented Turkey in the UN General Assembly, the ECOSOC, United Nations Conference on Trade and Development (UNCTAD), UNDP and various UN conferences.

He played a key role in the passage of notable resolutions including: ‘Measures to promote private foreign investment to developing countries’ (UNCTAD I) (1963) which resulted the establishment of Multilateral Investment Insurance scheme (currently operated under the authority of the World Bank); ‘Measures to be taken at the national level to ensure better coordination for international policy making (ECOSOC) (1969); ‘Measures to convene the United Nations Conference on Environment’ (ECOSOC) (1970); and ‘Establishment of World Tourism Organization’ (ECOSOC) (1971).

Kırdar was twice honored with ‘Outstanding Services Award’. In 1978 he was promoted, in absentia, to the rank of ambassador.

Following his career with the Turkish Foreign Service, Kırdar served the UN Secretariat in various high level capacities, including as a Senior Officer in the Office of the Secretary General of the United Nations; Secretary of the High-Level Group of Experts on the Restructuring of the UN system (1975); Secretary of the first UN Conference on Human Settlements (HABITAT), in Vancouver (1976); Director of External Relations and the Governing Council Secretariat of the United Nations Development Programme (1980–1992); Director of UNDP Development Study Programme (1981–96); Special Representative of the Secretary General and the Coordinator of the Second UN Conference on Human Settlements (HABİTAT II) in Istanbul (1994–96); Senior Advisor to the Administrator of UNDP (1992–98); and Senior Advisor to the President of the 49th session of UN General Assembly, to organize first ever UN World Hearings on Development.

From 1993 to 1997, Kırdar was President of the New York Chapter of the Society for International Development, the leading international non-profit focused on international development issues.

Another noticeable diplomatic achievement of Kırdar, during his UN career, was the critical role he played in 1979, in the formulation of the first program of Assistance of the United Nations system to the Palestinian People. This unpublicized economic peace agreement between the Israeli Government and Palestinian Authority formed the basis of subsequent assistance programs championed by the international community.

== Achievements ==
=== Human development theory ===
One of Kırdar’s accomplishments during his United Nations career was as one of the early and main conceptual leaders of Human development theory. Through his own extensive writings and by spearheading a series of expert group meetings, Kırdar helped to develop and launch a concept which has now become a core area of work for UNDP and the UN.

According to Kırdar’s writings, Human Development is the process which enables people to release their inner human energy towards developing their education, health, culture, well-being, skills, capacities, effectiveness, creativities, and competitiveness in order to serve themselves and ultimately their communities. Mutually, society and government have the primary responsibility to ensure people the necessary environment and means to enable the realization of this process, as well as to guarantee maximum political, economic and social freedom and rights to them for this purpose.

This definition and concept is more closely related to the capability approach, championed by economists including Amartya Sen, in contrast to basic needs approach, first introduced by the International Labour Organization (ILO), which dominated the formulation and analyses of most of the annual UNDP Human Development Reports.

=== UNDP Development Study Programme ===
In 1981, Kırdar established the UNDP Development Study Programme. As its founding Director, he organized more than 20 international round-table meetings as well as high-level expert seminars and lectures. The Study Programme also organized the annual UNDP Paul G. Hoffman Lecture which honored distinguished leaders including former President of Costa Rica Oscar Arias Sanchez (1995 “The Arms Bazaar”).

These events helped connect a cross-sectoral group of global thinkers and practitioners who helped to guide the conceptual direction of UNDP. The meetings, held from 1983 to 1996, brought together over 1,500 renowned international policy makers, leaders of private and public enterprises, representatives of the media, non-governmental organizations and academia. These included: academics such as U.S. Economist and Nobel Laureate Lawrence Klein, international leaders such as Prince Hassan bin Talal of Jordan and former President of the Club of Rome. The expert papers and outcomes of these roundtables provided critical strategic and intellectual input to UNDP and the multilateral community on issues ranging from political, economic, and social development; environmental sustainability, and the impact of ICT on the human condition.

The UNDP Development Study Programme thrived under Kırdar’s leadership and his fundraising ability. Following his retirement, the UNDP Development Study Programme was elevated to become the UNDP Office of Development Studies.

== Selected works ==
- The Structure of United Nations Economic-Aid to Underdeveloped Countries; Preface by R.Y.Jennings, Whewell Professor of International Law of the University of Cambridge (1966,Reprinted in 1969), Martinus Nijhoff, The Hague,Netherlands.
- The International Administrative Service(OPEX): Provision of Operational,Executive and Administrative Personnel by the Unite Nations, The British Year Book of International Law (1962);Published by Royal Institute of International Affairs; Oxford University Press,1964
- Human Resource Development: Challenge for the 8Os with Bradford Morse in Crisis of the 80 (1984)
- Impact of Debt on Human Conditions in LDCs: An Overview of the External Debt Situation in The Lingering Debt Crisis (1985)
- Human Development: The Neglected Dimension (1986) – UN sales No. E. 86. III. B.2, ISBN 92-1-126003-5
- Impact of IMF Conditionality on Human Conditions by Uner Kırdar (Chapter 14) in Adjustment with Growth: A Search for an Equitable Solution Edited by Khadija Haq and Canoe Massad. (1987)
- Human Development, Adjustment and Growth (1987) – UN sales No. E 87.III. B.1/02750S ISBN 92-1-126005-1
- Managing Human Development (1988) – UN sales No. E. 88.III.B.1 ISBN 92-1-126008-6
- Development for People (1990) – UN sales No.E.89.III.B.1;
- Change: Threat or Opportunity? United Nations Publication (1992) (Five Volumes) Complete Set UN sales No.E.91.III.10; ISBN 92-1-126029-9
- Political Change UN sales No.E.91.III.B.5; ISBN 978-92-1-126024-3
- Economic Change UN sales No.E.91.III.B.6; ISBN 92-1-126025-6
- Social Change UN sales No E.91.III.B.8; ISBN 92-1-126029-9
- Market Change UN sales No E 91.III.B.7; ISBN 92-1-126026-4
- Ecological Change UN sales No.E.91.III.B.9; ISBN 92-1-126028-0
- A World Fit for People with Leonard Silk. New York University Press (1993) UN sales No.E.93.III.B.2; ISBN 0-8147-4648-9
- People: From Impoverishment to Empowerment with Leonard Silk. New York University Press (1995) ISBN 0-8147-4670-5
- Cities Fit for People United Nations Publications (1997) UN sales No.E.97.III.B.12; ISBN 92-1-126072-8
- Conversation with Harold Hudson Channer with Dr. Uner Kirdar, President, Society for International Development on YouTube (1998)
- Humanizing the Digital Age United Nations Publications; UN sales No.E.07.11.A.3; ISBN 978-92-1-104566-6 (2007)
