= Timeline of the Battle of Mosul (2016–2017) =

Coordinates: 35.8003°N 43.2897°E

The timeline of the Battle of Mosul (2016–2017) is divided into the three phases.

- Timeline of the Battle of Mosul (2016–2017): Phase One (October to December, 2016)
- Timeline of the Battle of Mosul (2016–2017): Phase Two (December 2016 to February 2017)
- Timeline of the Battle of Mosul (2016–2017): Phase Three (February to July, 2017)
