= Timeline of the Battle of Mosul (2016–17): Phase One =

Part of the War in Iraq

Coordinates: 35.8003°N 43.2897°E

The following is a timeline of Phase one of the Battle of Mosul (2016–17) between October and December 2016.

== October: Initial advances ==
16–17 October

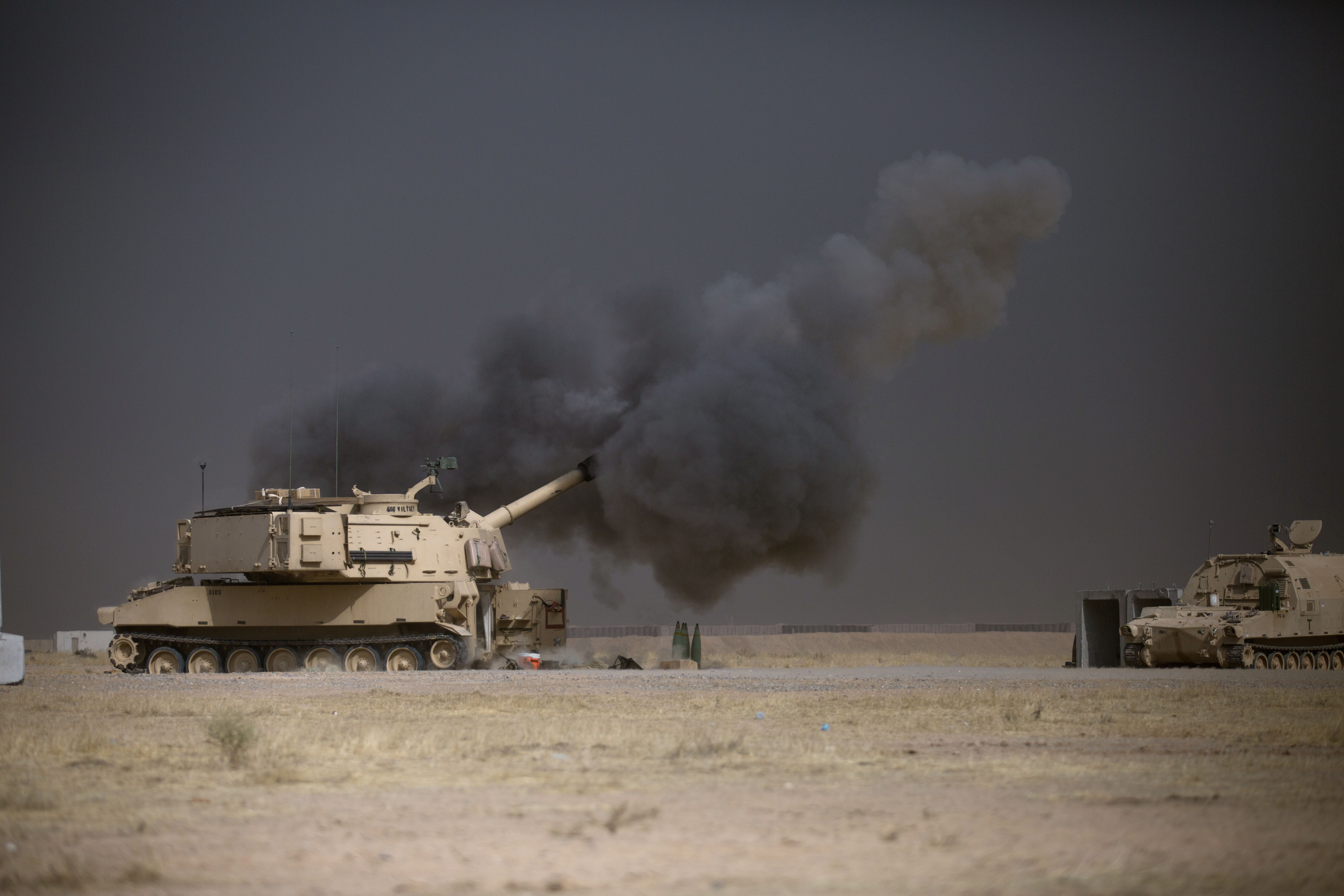
A U.S. Army M109A6 Paladin conducts a fire mission at Qayyarah Airfield West, in support of the Iraqi security forces' push toward Mosul, 17 October 2016.

On 16 October 2016, Iraqi Prime Minister Haider al-Abadi declared the beginning of the assault to recapture the city of Mosul. Officials reported howitzers firing on ISIL targets later that day. The main assault began on 17 October at approximately 6 a.m., local time, with shelling and the arrival of armored vehicles to the front lines. The Peshmerga in the Khazir region, east of Mosul, started the ground assault by advancing on ISIL-held villages from three fronts, while Iraqi security forces advanced from the south. Iraqi troops advanced on the Bartella area east of Mosul while ISIL fighters fired mortars at Peshmerga. The President of KRG, Massoud Barzani, said that Peshmerga and Iraqi government fighters retook 200 square kilometers (80 square miles) from ISIL on the first day of fighting. Iraqi government officials reported that "heavy losses of life and equipment" were inflicted upon ISIL fighters in the Hamdaniya district southeast of Mosul. ISIL fighters who were wounded in the battle were reported to have been bussed towards its Syrian headquarters of Raqqa for medical aid. The anti-ISIL coalition destroyed 52 targets during the day. Family members of ISIL fighters fled from Mosul to the village of Nawran due to the shelling. It was also reported that some fighters had started shaving their beards and were getting rid of their Afghan uniforms. ISIL was also reported to have evacuated and shifted its headquarters from the west side of Mosul to its east side. A bridge into Mosul known as the "Freedom Bridge" was destroyed. Peshmerga sources blamed ISIL for its destruction, while ISIL claimed it was destroyed by airstrikes.

18 October

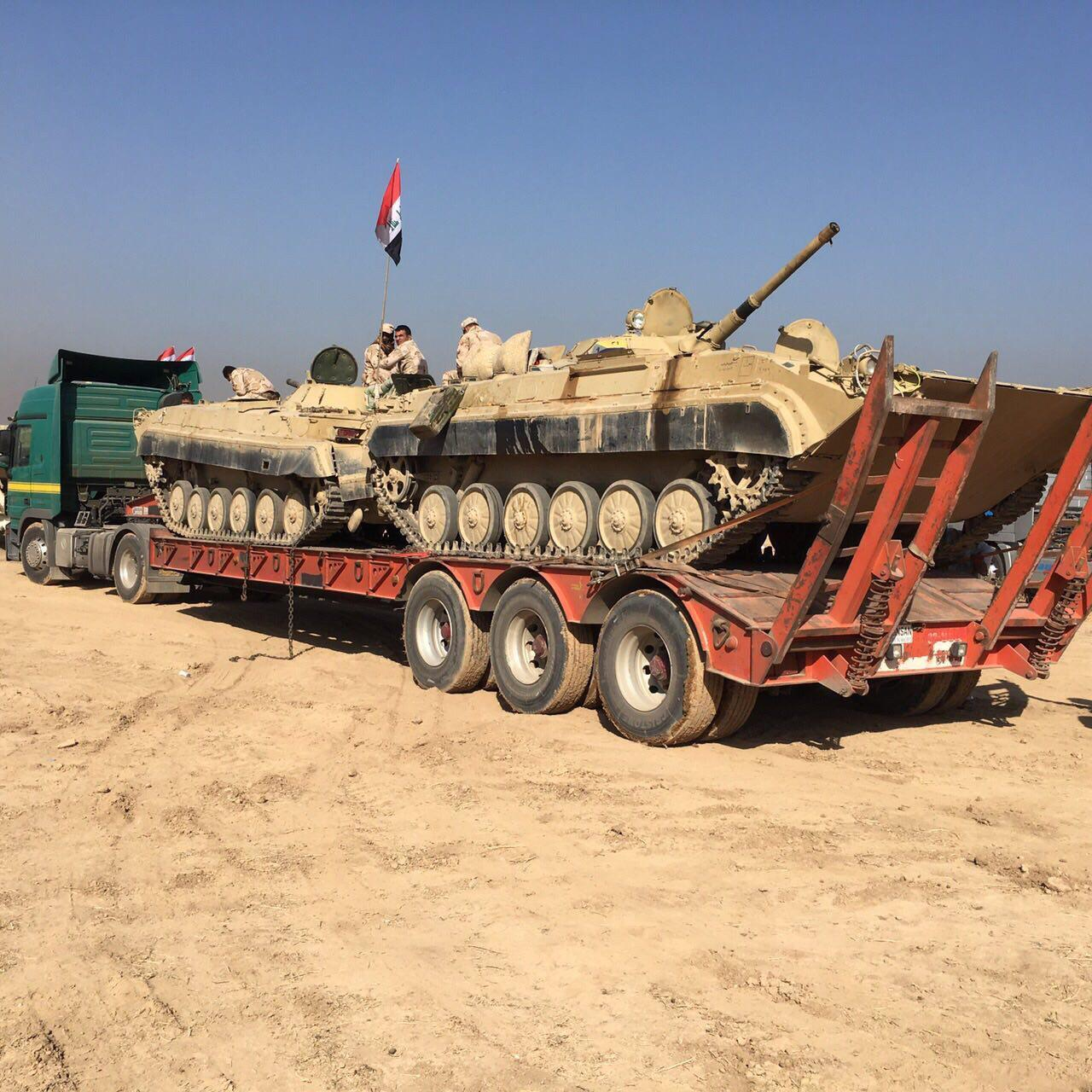
Iraqi security forces transport two BMP-1 infantry fighting vehicles to tactical assembly areas with assistance from the 313th Movement Control Battalion forward element, on 18 October 2016, near Makhmur, Iraq

On 18 October, the Iraqi government declared that twenty villages near Mosul were captured from ISIL in the first 24 hours of fighting by the Peshmerga and Iraqi forces. On the southern front, Iraqi troops retook several villages near Qayyarah, including al-Sirt, Bajwaniya, al-Hud, and al-Mashraf, and parts of the al-Hamdaniya District southeast of Mosul. Iraqi Federal Police also regained control of 56 oilfields in the Qayyarah district. According to reports, the Peshmerga met little resistance on the eastern front, while Iraqi and PMF fighters coming from the south were facing tougher resistance from ISIL.

The coalition strategy was reported to be to encircle Mosul completely, after which Iraqi troops would advance into the city-center. Early in the day on 18 October, Iraqi forces in the east came close to Qaraqosh (Bakhdida), once the largest Assyrian town in Iraq, and fighters in the south were closing in on Hammam al-'Alil. Iraqi Army forces later stormed Qaraqosh and fought with ISIL fighters who remained holed up. The Iraqi and Peshmerga advance had been slowed down during the same day due to suicide bombers, roadside IEDs and oil fires. In order to eliminate any ISIL presence completely from the villages on the outskirts of the city, they were carrying out street-by-street search operations. The Peshmerga later paused their advance while the Iraqi Army continued its advance.

Pro-government fighters in the south of Mosul were battling pockets of ISIL fighters and snipers as they tried to reclaim the village of Abbasi, and expected to soon take control of the village of Zawiya. Fighting resumed in the village of Kani Harami, which was captured by the Iraqi Army a day earlier but recaptured by ISIL on 18 October as the Army lacked reinforcements. The Army also retook the village of Al-Hud on the Tigris, where villagers had risen up against ISIL and killed at least 9 militants. State police also secured the Al-Mishraq sulfur plant south of Mosul. The al-Shura district was stated by its mayor to have been captured by the Iraqi security forces. Joint airstrikes by Iraqi and coalition warplanes on ISIL headquarters in Mosul destroyed 13 targets and killed 35 militants.

As the Iraqi Army advanced on Mosul, rebellion against ISIL broke out in the city. The group's Islamic Police revolted and attacked four headquarters of the organisation. The revolt was put down with 7 rebellious leaders being killed and many militants being executed. A group of rebels attacked a headquarters of the group the next day, killed 2 militants and raised the Iraqi flag over the building. ISIL patrols in the city were also attacked.

19 October

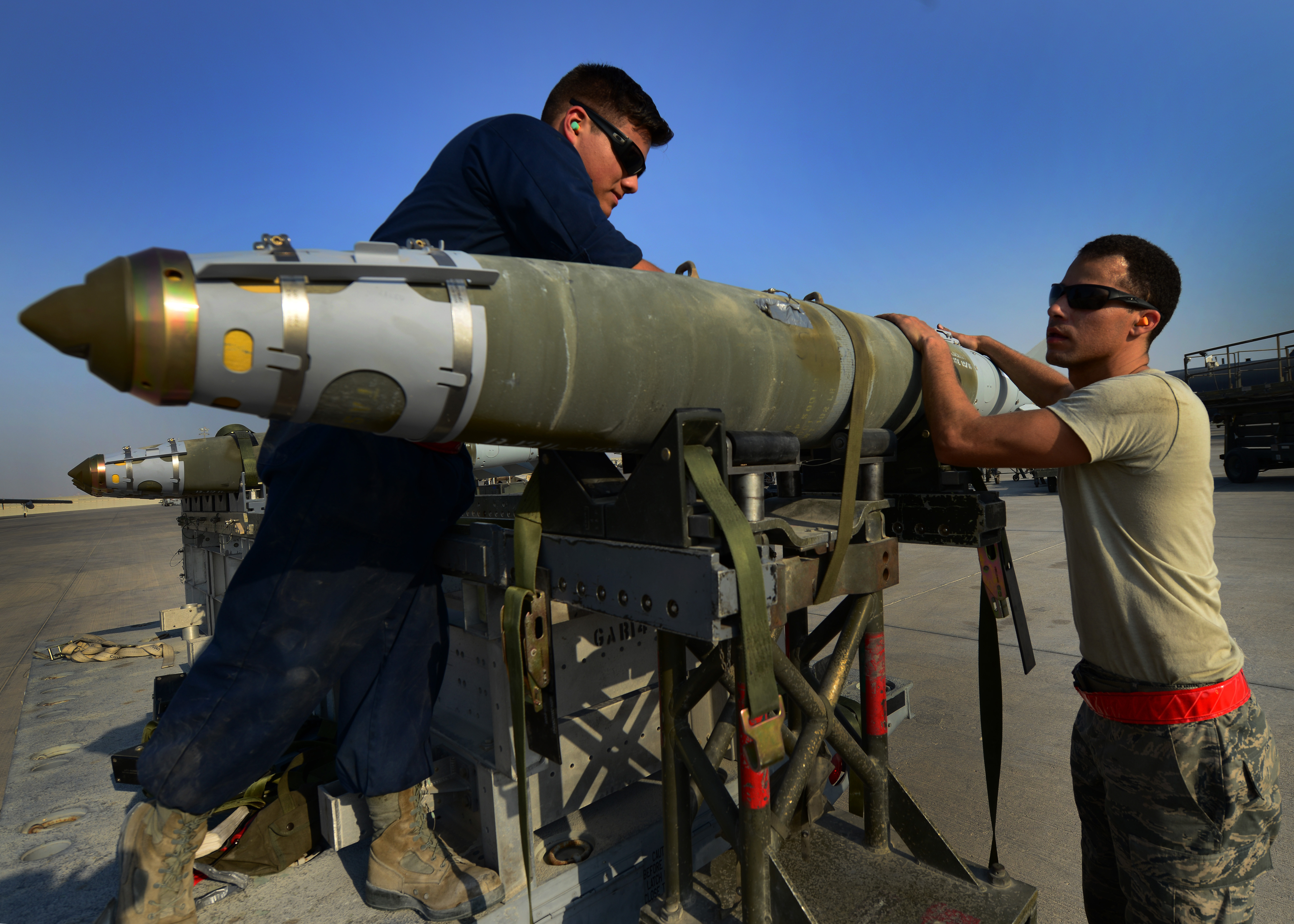
Airmen assigned to the 379th Expeditionary Aircraft Maintenance Squadron prepare to load a Joint Direct Attack Munition onto an aircraft on 19 October as part of the U.S.-led airstrikes supporting the offensive.

The Iraqi Army resumed fighting on 19 October, surrounding Qaraqosh with ISIL deploying snipers and car bombs. Lt. Gen. Qassim al-Maliki declared that Iraqi forces had captured 13 villages north and northeast of Al Quwayr, south of Mosul. The Iraqi Army was also reported to be within 6 kilometres (3.7 mi) from the outskirts of Mosul. The village of Kani Harami was captured after heavy fighting in the morning with the militants retreating to Abbasiyah. A total of 22 towns were reported to have been captured, with 12 by the Peshmerga and 10 by the ISF. Nofal Hammadi, governor of the Nineveh Governorate, declared that 40% of the province had been retaken from ISIL.

The offensive to retake the town of Bashiqa northeast of Mosul, originally scheduled for dawn, was delayed due to lack of logistical support. Thousands of Peshmerga were reportedly preparing to retake Bashiqa. The international coalition's commander Gary Voelsky also stated that a majority of ISIL leaders were fleeing Mosul and predicted foreign fighters would form the majority of militants remaining in the city.

20 October

The fighting grew more intense on 20 October. A large convoy of Golden Division arrived at positions retaken by the Peshmerga forces. They also captured Bartella. ISIL fighters detonated 9 truck bombs during the fighting. According to Maj. Gen. Maan al-Saadi of the Iraqi Army, 200 ISIL fighters were killed in the fight for Bartella.

The Peshmerga and NPF also announced a "large-scale operation" to the north and northeast of Mosul, aiming to retake the Assyrian towns of Tesqopa and Bashiqa. During the day, the Peshmerga captured 6 villages, including 4 on the Bashiqa front line and 2 on the Nawaran front. In addition, they also entered another 4 villages. They briefly captured the village of Tiz Khirab but were forced to withdraw. On the southern front, Iraqi forces resumed their push north after a brief pause and recaptured six villages east of Qayyarah.

ISIL also set Al-Mishraq sulfur plant on fire, causing two deaths and nearly 1,000 hospitalizations from sulfur fume inhalation. An ISIL ambush near Bashiqa left dozens of Peshmerga dead or wounded. The group was also reported to be digging trenches to slow the advancement of coalition troops.

21 October

ISIL launched multiple attacks in Kirkuk on 21 October to divert military resources. Multiple explosions and gun battles in the city, mostly centered on a government compound were reported. A senior Peshmerga commander said that attackers had entered by posing as IDPs. Iraqi government forces meanwhile reported that they had retaken 2 more villages south of Mosul and killed 15 militants.

22 October

On 22 October, Iraqi police declared that ISIL's attack on Kirkuk had been repelled and all attackers had been killed or had blown themselves up. Iraqi officials also stated that 80 people were killed in Kirkuk, primarily Kurdish security forces, and about 170 wounded; 56 ISIL militants were also killed. A reporter of Türkmeneli TV also died in the attack, while at least seven journalists were wounded.

A large-scale offensive began to retake the Assyrian town of Qaraqosh which remained under ISIL control after several days of fighting. Iraqi troops also advanced on the town of Tel Keppe, north of Mosul. Shifting winds sent the gas from the ablaze Al Mishraq sulphur plant to Qayyarah Airfield West, where U.S. and coalition forces were forced to use gas masks. A journalist was also killed by a sniper in the al-Shura area.

Blogger Mosul Eye reported that ISIL had executed detainees and teens aged 15–18 comprised the majority of ISIL fighters in Mosul. The group was also reported to have planted bombs and booby traps throughout the city and was preparing for battle.

23–24 October

The Peshmerga claimed on 23 October that they had recaptured Bashiqa, however it was reported on the following day that they were still trying to capture it with the help of the Turkish military. The Peshmerga General Command also stated that Peshmerga had cordoned off 8 villages and had secured a significant stretch of the Bashiqa-Mosul highway. It also stated that they were now within 9 kilometres (5.6 mi) of the city.

ISIL increased its counterattacks in order to distract the pro-government advancing towards Mosul. In addition to the attack on Kirkuk on 21 October, ISIL fighters struck Ar-Rutbah as well as Sinjar. Yazidi provincial chief Mahma Xelil said that at least 15 ISIL fighters were killed and two Peshmerga wounded in a two-hour battle in Sinjar. ISIL claimed its forces destroyed two Peshmerga vehicles, killing all on board. Nearly 800 ISIL fighters had been killed while 78 villages were reported to have been retaken from the group as of 24 October. The attack on Kirkuk was also brought to an end by 24 October, with 74 militants being killed and others, including the leader of the attackers, being arrested.

25 October

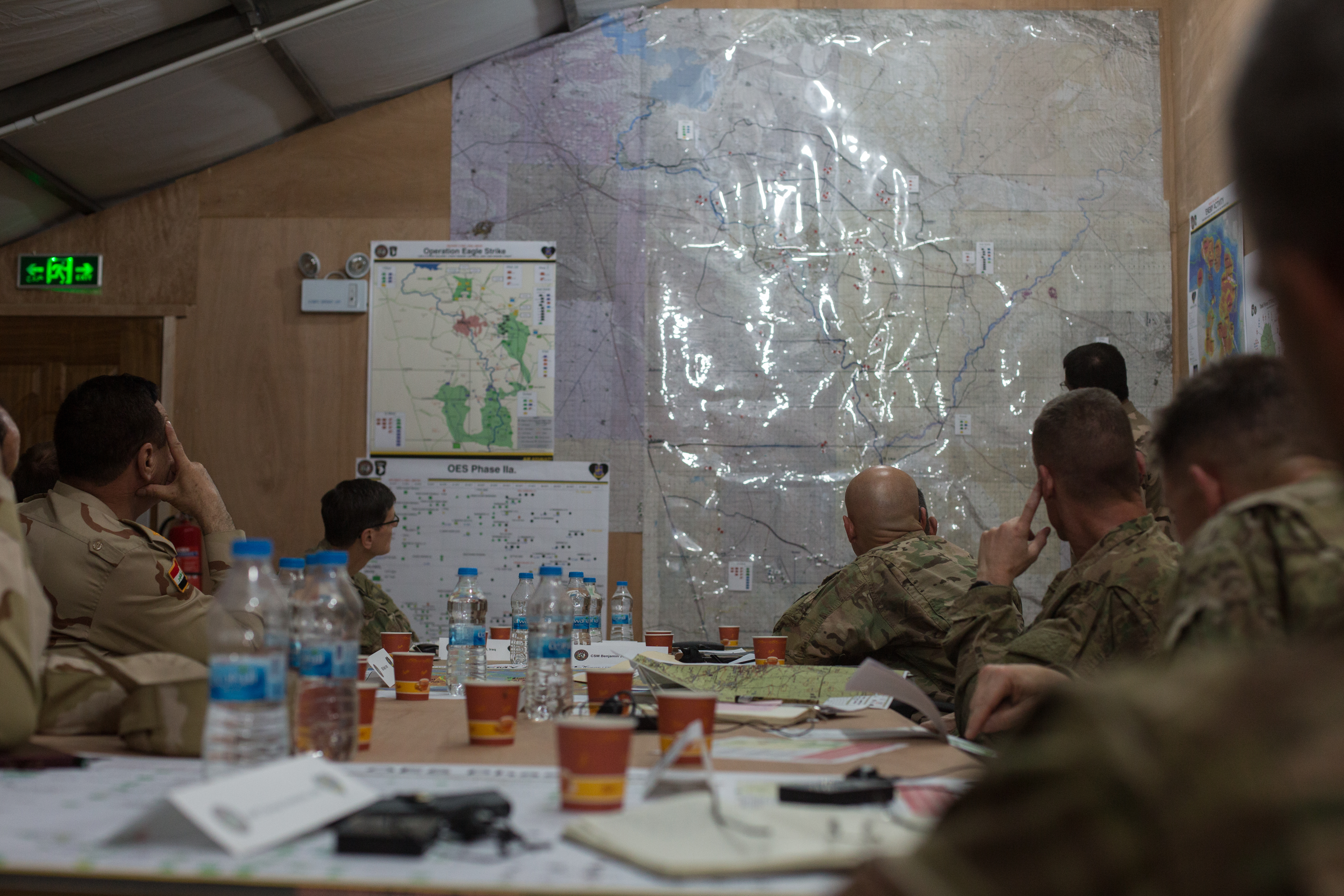
U.S. Army and Iraqi military leaders discuss battle plans at Qayyarah Airfield West, 25 October.

Iraqi Special Operations Forces, advancing on Mosul from the east of the city, were reported to be within 2 kilometres (1.2 mi) of the city and were pausing to wait for reinforcements before proceeding. Turkish military supporting the Peshmerga destroyed several ISIL targets in the Bashiqa region of Northern Iraq. ISIL also used the burning oil trenches to impede the visibility of the Iraqi Air Force and international coalition air force and executed 9 deserters.

26 October

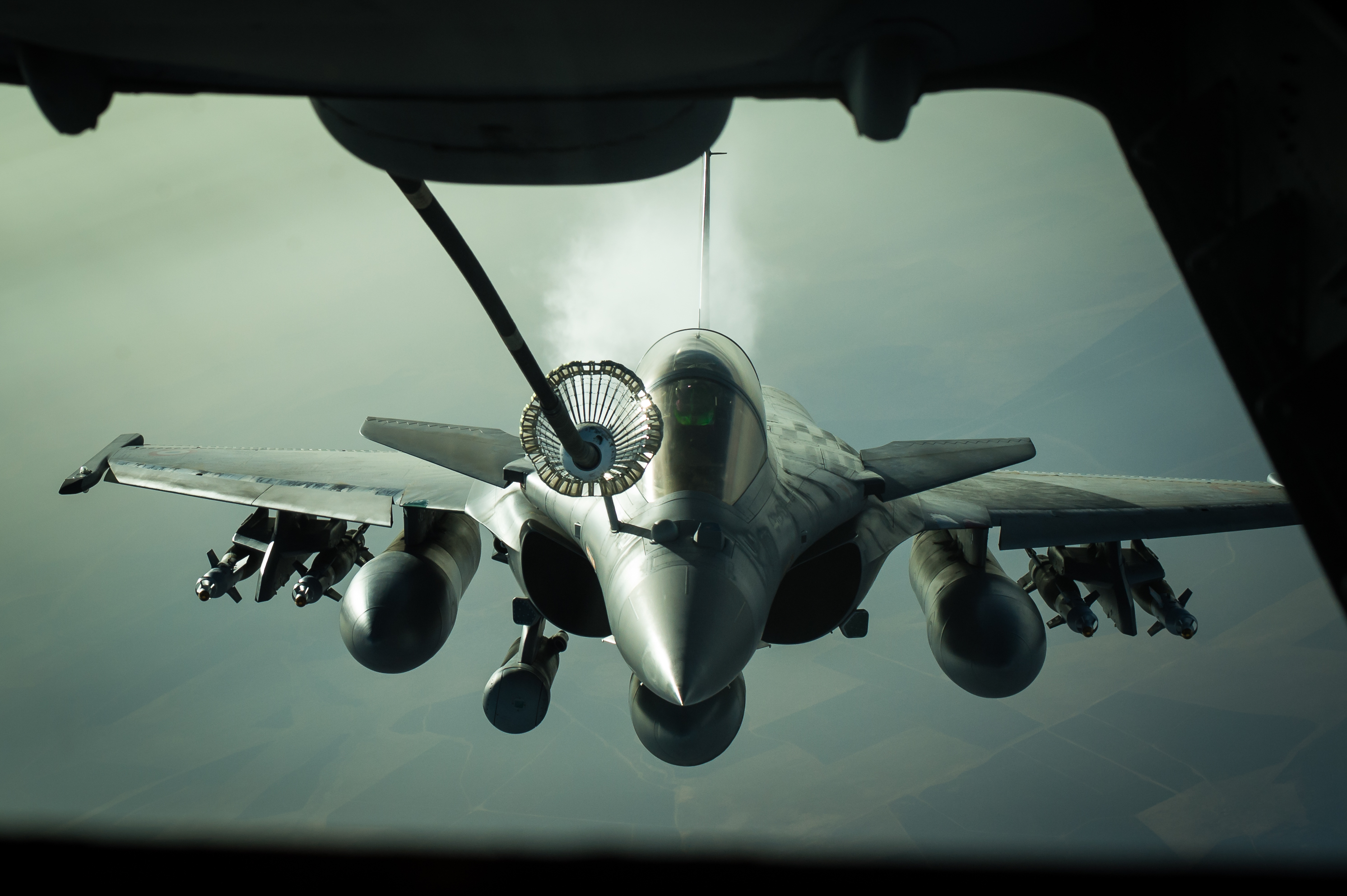
A French Dassault Rafale is refueled from a KC-10 Extender on 26 October near Iraq. The French Air Force has 24 Rafale-Ms supporting the coalition forces.

Iraqi forces were met with heavy resistance from ISIL as they attempted to clear the militants from villages in Shora, south of Mosul. Hundreds of ISIL suicide bombers were reported to have been sent from Syria to defend Mosul.

Meanwhile, Peshmerga forces captured the village of Derk, 12 kilometres (7.5 mi) northeast of Mosul, where they discovered a large ISIL tunnel containing a large cache of weapons. Stephen Townsend, the commander of US forces in Iraq, stated that coalition forces had delivered more than 2,100 aerial bombs, artillery and mortar shells, rockets and missiles since the offensive to retake Mosul started. The Iraqi government stated that 57 Iraqi soldiers had been killed and about 250 wounded while 20 to 30 Peshmerga fighters are thought to have been killed.

27 October

Captain Fahd al-Laithi of Iraq's National Information Agency stated that 13 militants were killed in a coalition airstrike that targeted an IS concentration in the Hamam al-Alil district while Iraqi forces had managed to retake 2 villages to the south of Mosul. The head of the United States Central Command, Gen. Joseph Votel stated that 800–900 militants had been killed in the battle.

28 October

U.S. military officials estimated on 28 October that were 3,000 to 5,000 ISIL fighters left defending Mosul while 1,500 to 2,000 militants were stationed outside the city. Abdulrahman al Wagga, a member of Nineveh provincial council, stated that Iraqi forces had retaken the town of Al-Shura, to the south of Mosul and had evacuated 5,000 to 6,000 civilians from there. He further stated that the area was now being cleared of homemade bombs and booby traps while security forces had almost surrounded Hammam al-Alil. He also stated Iraqi security forces might storm Hammam al-Alil in the next few hours but that it would depend on the situation on the ground, as civilians were still present and ISIL militants were using a "scorched earth" policy by destroying houses, buildings and bridges to slow them down.

Peshmerga and Iraqi forces also captured Fadiliya, which lies just 4 km away from Mosul. UN meanwhile stated that ISIL had taken tens of thousands of civilians to use as human shields in Mosul, including at least 5,000 families from around Al-Shura and 2,210 families from the Nimrud area of Hamdaniya. Those who refused to go were executed

29 October

The PMF stated on 29 October they had launched an offensive towards the west of Mosul with an aim to capture villages west of Mosul and reach the town of Tal Afar in order to prevent ISIL fighters from retreating into neighboring Syria or any reinforcement for their defense of Mosul. They have been tasked with recapturing around 14,000 km^{2} of territory from the group. They also stated that they would not enter Mosul. Meanwhile, Iraqi Army and PMF captured 15 villages from ISIL.

Mosul Eye confirmed that civilians from outside Mosul had been abducted and forced into the city by ISIL which was confiscating homes from people for their own use. A new escape route from Mosul had been set up by Syrian Kurds, who were charging $3,000 per person to smuggle people out of the city to Turkey. The blog also reported that all bridges into the city were booby-trapped with IEDs.

30 October

The Peshmerga stated on 30 October that they had captured six more villages to north and east of Mosul, and had seized control of several major roads and landmarks. It also stated that it had captured 500 square kilometers of territory since the operation began. PMF meanwhile stated that they had captured eight more villages to the southwest of Mosul. SOHR stated that at least 480 Syrian fighters including 300 child soldiers (known as "Cubs of the Caliphate") brought to Iraq by ISIL had been killed since the offensive began.

31 October

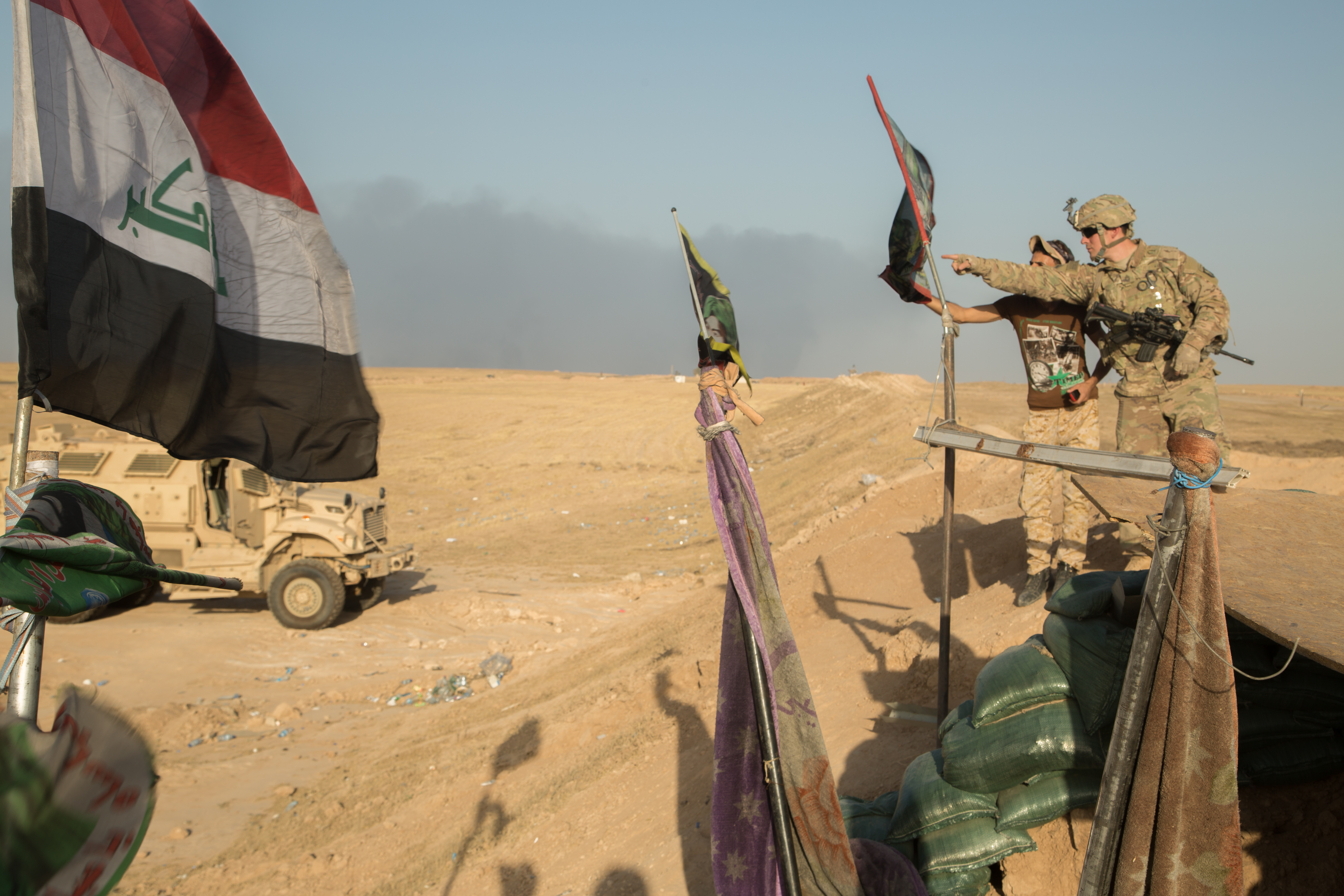
A U.S. soldier of the 101st Airborne Division and a member of the Iraqi Special Operations Forces discuss assessment of Iraqi security force checkpoints on 31 October at Qayyarah Airfield West.

On 31 October, a major Iraqi operation was launched on Bazwaya, to the east of Mosul. The ISOF came under heavy fire from ISIL but managed to capture the town along with several nearby villages. After capturing Bazwaya, ISOF were less than 1 mile (1.6 km) from Mosul.

Several Iraqi military officials stated that ISOF will begin its push into Mosul shortly. The U.S.-led coalition meanwhile aimed to target ISIL militants from the air if they attempted to flee the city. The US Department of Defense stated that hundreds of militants were believed to have already escaped. Iraqi Prime Minister Haider al-Abadi meanwhile called on ISIL fighters in Mosul to surrender.

== November: Entering East Mosul, reaching Tal Afar ==
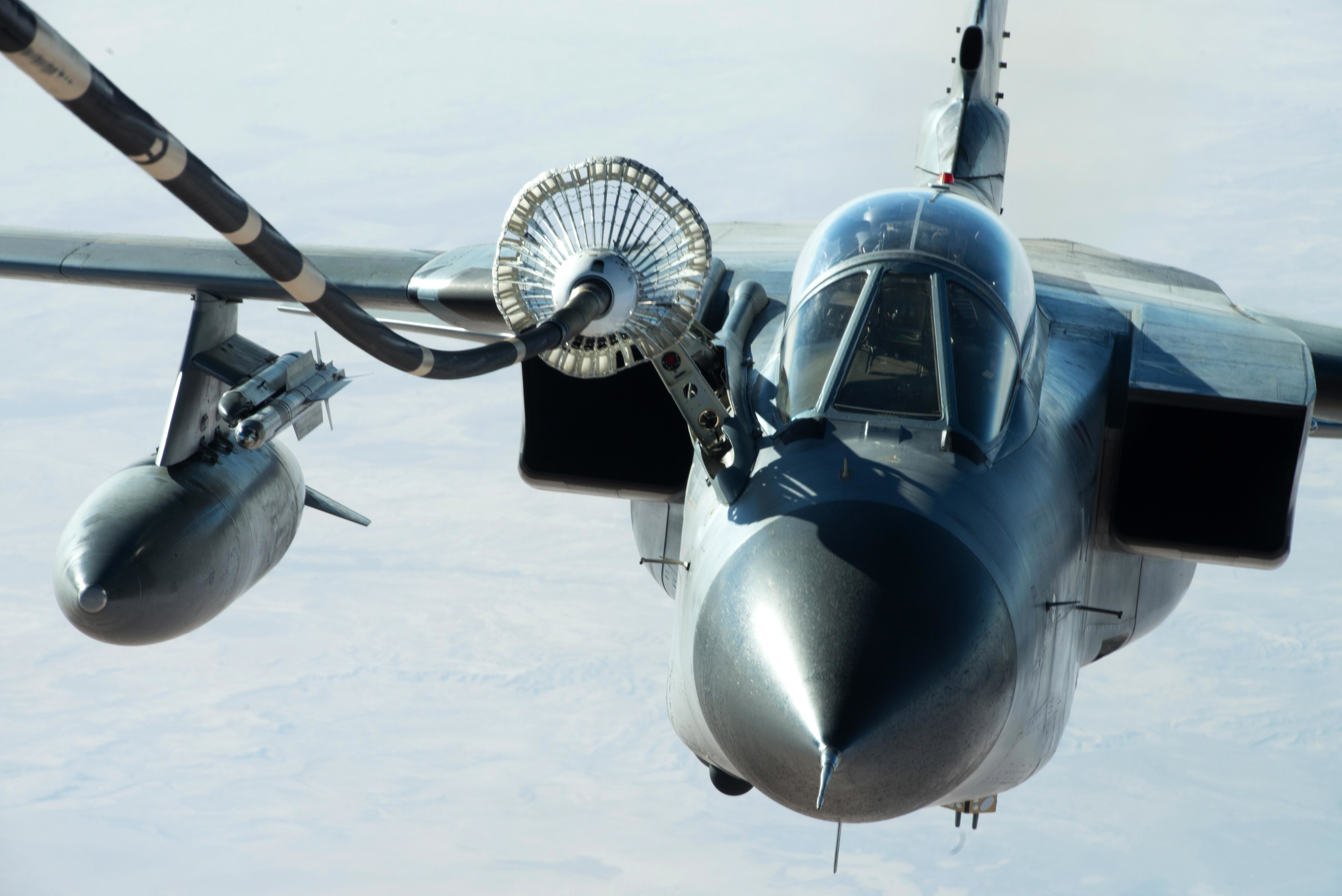
A German Air Force Tornado ECR refuels near Mosul, November 2016

1 November

The operation to enter the city began at dawn on 1 November. The forces began their assault in Mosul's eastern Karama district, with artillery, tank and machine-gun fire on ISIL positions as they prepared the larger push into the city. Airstrikes by the U.S.-led coalition targeted ISIL positions, and ISIL started tire fires to reduce visibility.

Heavy fighting occurred in the Gogjali district, at the gate of the entrance to eastern Mosul, where ISIL militants used car bombs and sniper fire to try to halt the advance. The Golden Division entered Mosul's city limits that afternoon, engaging in street fights with ISIL militants. Shortly after, the Iraqi Army announced that they had captured Mosul's state television building on the city's left bank. The Gogjali district was reported to be under Iraqi government control by the evening, while the Iraqi Army's 9th Division and 3rd Brigade had entered the neighborhood of Judaydat al-Mufti on the left bank. Near midnight, the Iraqi war media office reported that airstrikes had killed 116 militants inside Mosul, including 29 in Ghabat, 10 at an ISIL headquarters, 10 at a weapons depot and 67 at a hotel pool. They also stated that Iraqi government forces suffered no casualties. Meanwhile, Iraqi government forces captured two villages on the northern front.

Brigadier Saad Maan, the spokesperson of Iraq's Interior Ministry, stated that the plan of the joint command in Nineveh was going faster than the Army had planned. On the western front, at least 15 Popular Mobilization Forces (PMU) fighters were killed when they entered abandoned villages booby-trapped with explosives. ISIL also executed fifty deserters in Mosul.

2 November

On 2 November, ISOF continued fighting remaining ISIL fighters in the eastern section of Gogjali. Iraqi Brigadier General Haider Fadhil said his troops were forced to hold their positions in eastern Mosul as poor weather conditions were limiting visibility for drones and aircraft, and preventing them from advancing. Meanwhile, eight militants were killed in Mosul by Iraqi forces.

The PMU announced that it had captured 115 km² that day after fierce fighting with ISIL, including six villages, and had surrounded three ISIL-held villages. They also claimed that they had reached a highway to the southwest of Mosul and had cut the first supply line to Mosul from Raqqa. The Iraqi Army in the southern front launched an offensive in the morning to recapture Hamam al-Alil and engaged in heavy fighting with the group. Meanwhile, Iraqi Federal Police captured two villages in the south.

3 November

ISIL released an audio file purportedly from their leader Abu Bakr al-Baghdadi, in which he said he was "confident of victory" in Mosul, and urged ISIL fighters not to retreat.

Meanwhile, the Iraqi Army's 9th Armored Division was reported to have entered the neighborhood of al-Intisar in eastern Mosul. while Mosul's Fifth Bridge, located over the Tigris river, was destroyed by airstrikes.

U.S. and Iraqi authorities stated the offensive was "ahead of schedule" while Brigadier Saad Maan stated that the priority of protecting civilian lives and infrastructure would possibly slow their advance into the city.

4 November

The Iraqi Army recaptured six districts in Mosul, including the eastern district of al-Zahra of which they claimed to have captured 90%. They were also forced to withdraw from Karama district because of heavy resistance. Meanwhile, ISIL was reported to be abducting Mosul's boys to use as child soldiers.

5 November

Fighting continued in the morning, with clashes most intense in the neighborhood of al-Bakr. The eastern neighborhoods of Kirkukli and al-Zahra in the east and Al-Tahrir in the north-east were under Iraqi control while the southern neighborhoods of Qudes and Karama reportedly remained under ISIL control. Fighting resumed in the Gogjali district, after militants emerged via tunnels during the night.

CNN's Arwa Damon, who was embedded with ISOF in Mosul, reported being trapped for 28 hours near the neighborhoods of Kirkukli and Khadraa after an ambush on their military convoy forced them to run into buildings for cover and hide among civilians. Despite multiple soldiers being injured, backup forces were unable to assist as they were also under attack.

ISIL claimed it had killed fifteen Iraqi soldiers and destroyed six military vehicles. Meanwhile, satellite images released by private U.S. firm Stratfor revealed ISIL had installed defenses including rubble blocking main routes to the city center, rows of concrete barricades, and earthen berms. The images also showed evidence that ISIL had leveled buildings and cleared the terrain around a former military base on the west bank and around the Mosul International Airport.

The Iraqi Army continued its assault on three fronts to Hamam al-Alil. In the early afternoon, Iraqi forces entered the town center with heavy clashes continuing. ISIL fighters were reportedly traveling by motorcycle to avoid airstrikes. During the night, Hamam al-Alil was reported to have been retaken by Iraqi forces.

6 November

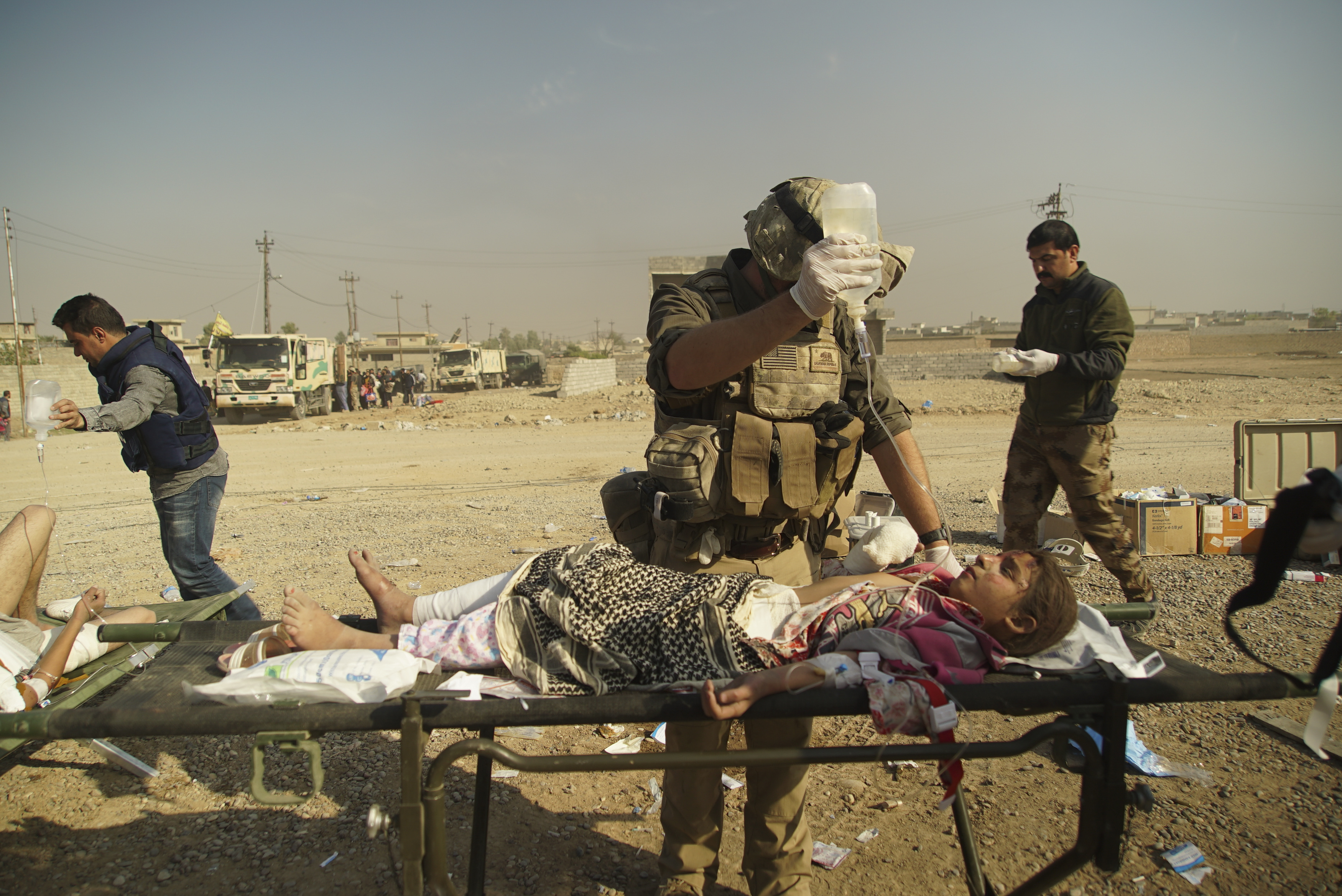
Field hospital in Mosul, 6 November 2016

On 6 November, Iraqi forces in the southwestern front stated that they were 4 kilometres (2.5 mi) from Mosul International Airport after taking control of Hamam al-Alil the previous day. They also stormed the Al-Sada district, their first entrance into northern Mosul. The Iraq War Media Office announced that Abu Hamza al-Ansari, a key ISIL leader from Algeria, was killed in southern Mosul during clashes with the Iraqi Army's 15th Division.

Mosul Eye reported that ISIL had begun installing bombs around residential buildings. Meanwhile, a Kurdish official stated that three militants had been killed in an uprising by civilians in eastern Mosul.

7 November

The Peshmerga, backed by coalition airstrikes, launched an offensive from three fronts in the morning to take the town of Bashiqa, which was still held by ISIL and had been surrounded for about two weeks. About 100 to 200 ISIL militants were estimated to be left in the town. In the early afternoon, the Iraqi troops also advanced on the town of Tel Keppe, north of Mosul, besieging the town. The town of Bashiqa was reported to be fully under Peshmerga control, though an ISIL pocket remained under siege in the town until the end of the month.

On the southern front, Hamam al-Alil, which had been reported to be under Iraqi control two days earlier, was fully captured by pro-government forces. In eastern Mosul, the ISOF surrounded the neighborhoods of Karama, Malayyin al-Salasa, Shquq Khazraa, Zahra, Karkuli, Aden, and Zahabi. The Iraqi Army's 9th armored division and the 3rd Brigade captured the village of Manarat Shabak east of the city, and made an incursion into the eastern Mosul neighborhoods of Hay Intisar, Judaydah al-Mufti, and Hay Shaima. Meanwhile, the Iraqi Federal Police captured two villages near Hammam Al-Alil.

8 November

The Peshmerga killed twelve ISIL fighters trying to flee Bashiqa. In the western front, PMU forces were reported to have advanced to a distance of 25 km towards strategically important Tal Afar military air base, south of the city. CJTF–OIR also stated it had carried out an airstrike on an ISIL headquarters building near Tal Afar. ISIL senior commander Mahmoud Shukri al-Nuaimi was also reported to have been killed in a coalition airstrike in western Mosul.

9 November

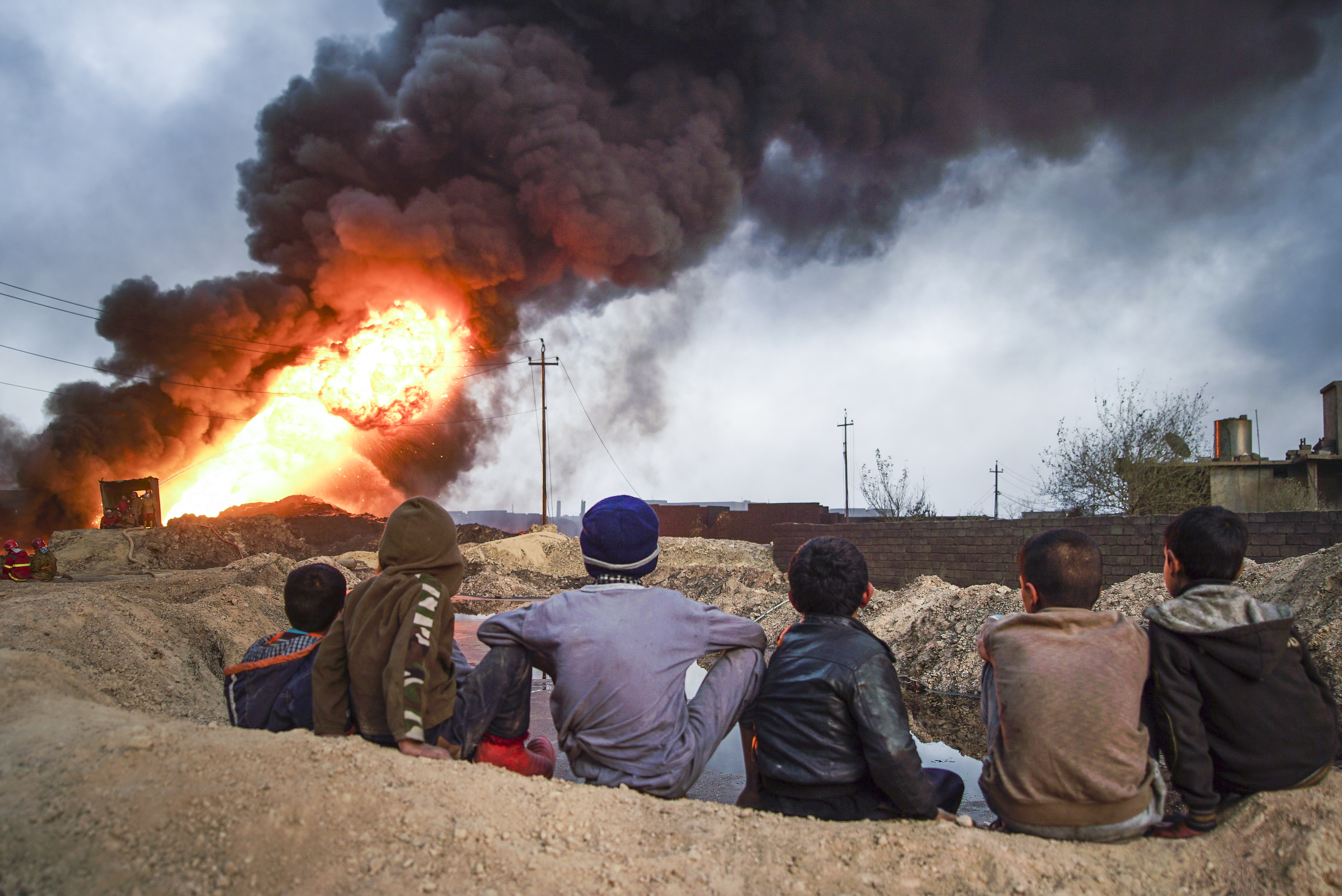
Local boys observing cityscape of Qayyarah town on fire

The Peshmerga fully cleared the town of Bashiqa from ISIL forces, though they were still clearing the city of The ISOF captured the majority of the Intisar district in southern Mosul, while ISIL had reportedly deployed armed child soldiers in Mosul. Aid agencies were unable to reach Mosul's neighborhoods retaken by Iraqi forces because of the danger of boobytraps and snipers.

10 November

In eastern Mosul, the Golden Division (controlling Zahra district and at least half of Aden district where clashes were ongoing) as well as elements of the 9th division (controlling Intisar district) were reported to be regrouping and clearing neighborhoods once occupied by ISIL, as well as screening residents fleeing from Mosul for any militants hiding among them. On the southern front, pro-government forces advanced towards the ancient city of Nimrud. Iraqi officials announced that the new ISIL war official, Khaled al-Mitwiti, had been killed, while the Abbas Rajab village was captured by Iraqi forces.

11 November

On the southern front, Iraqi forces were preparing to advance up the western bank of the Tigris River toward Mosul International Airport. In eastern Mosul, Iraqi forces launched a new offensive to regain control of the neighborhood of Karkukli. Iraqi anti-terror units were reported to have entered the Qadesiyya neighborhood.

12 November

On 12 November, heavy clashes were reported in the al-Salam neighborhood of east Mosul. Iraqi Army announced that it had captured al-Arbajiya district and was clearing the adjacent al-Qadisiya al-Thaniya district. They also reached Palestine neighborhood in southeast Mosul and were engaged in battle with ISIL in the Quds neighborhood. The PMU announced that the Sinjar Resistance Units (YBŞ) as its part, had started the operation to capture villages around Sinjar from ISIL.

After a number of its senior leaders were killed by a coalition air strike in east Mosul, ISIL imposed a curfew in the city. A local source also stated that the group was evacuating families of its fighters from west to east Mosul, denoting a severe collapse of defenses on the western front. Its fighters were meanwhile using drones for surveillance as well as suicide bombers and snipers against the Iraqi Army.

13 November

On 13 November, Iraqi forces recaptured the ancient Assyrian city of Nimrud as well as the adjacent modern town. Iraqi forces meanwhile captured the Karkojli neighborhood in eastern Mosul. Brig. Gen. Maan al Saadi, the commander of the 2nd Group of ISOF, stated ISIL was collapsing and losing control, with Iraqi forces now only two days away from seizing a neighborhood where they planned to fight for four days.

14 November

On 14 November, thirty ISIL fighters, including senior leaders, were killed as PMU forces captured the village of al-Abbas. They also captured two more villages, and stated ISIL received severe human and material losses. Meanwhile, twenty militants were killed in airstrikes by the Iraqi air Force.

Pro-government forces on the southern front captured the village of Bo Youssef and were 3 kilometres (1.9 mi) from Mosul airport. ISIL meanwhile launched three attacks using rockets filled with mustard gas on Qayyarah, causing seven casualties.

15 November

On 15 November, 49 militants were killed in airstrikes by the United States Air Force on the al-Bakr neighborhood of Mosul. Troops of the Golden Division meanwhile began storming areas in northern and eastern Mosul, including the neighborhoods of al-Akhaa, al-Bakr and al-Hadbaa. Two car bombs were destroyed while three suicide bombers were killed. On the Western front, the Badr Organization announced that it had captured two villages and advanced 10 kilometers in the western axis of the offensive.

16 November

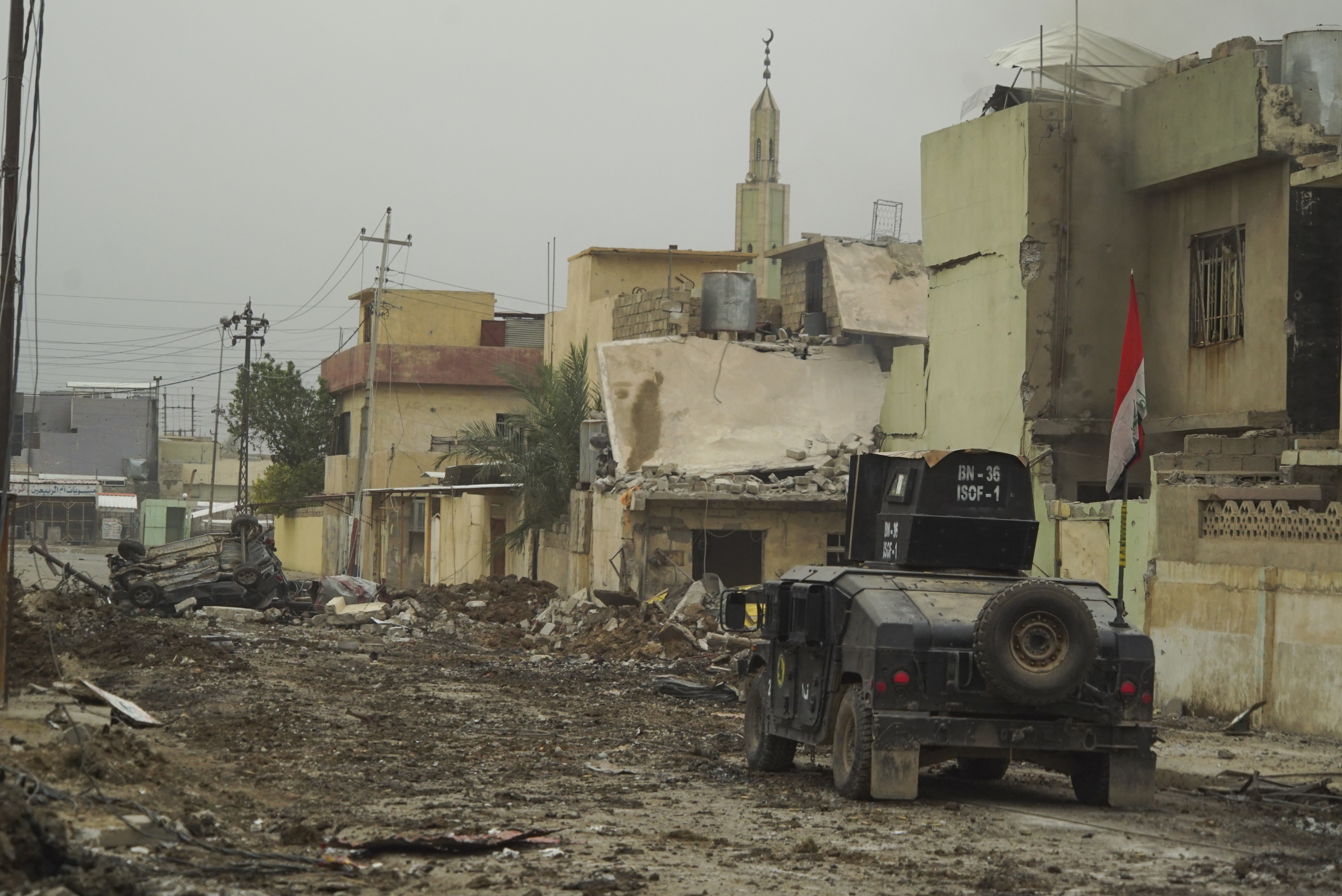
ISOF APC on the street of Mosul, 16 November 2016

On 16 November, fourteen civilians were killed by ISIL in the al-Zahraa neighborhood under government control. Airstrikes by the US-led coalition meanwhile destroyed 4 watercraft, 6 mortar systems, 2 fighting positions, 2 vehicles, a bunker and a building held by ISIL.

PMF also took control of Tal Afar military airbase, to the northwest of the city of Mosul.

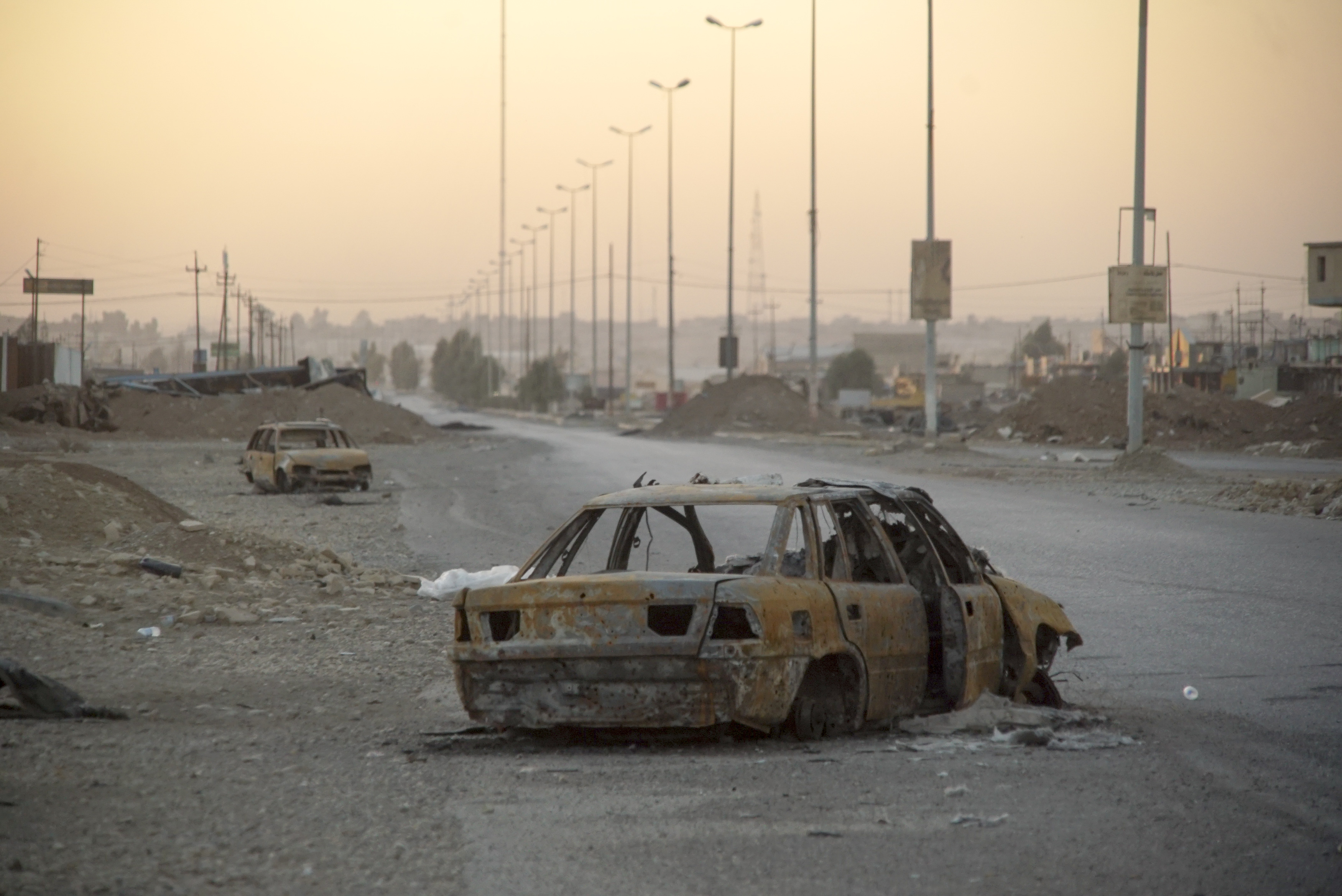
Outskirts of Mosul, 17 November 2016

18 November

On 18 November, in the West, PMF were securing and clearing Tal Afar military airbase, which they had captured from ISIL two days earlier, and preparing the assault on the city proper. In the vicinity, they were attacking further villages, in an area infamous for Sunni Islamist militancy and outstanding support for ISIL among the population. PMF control had already been established in over 16 villages in the surrounding area, during preceding days.

20 November

The Anti-Terrorism Directorate said in a statement aired by the state-owned television that the Anti-Terrorism forces managed to liberate the areas of Hayy Adan, al-Akhaa and the water project in Mosul, within the eastern axis of Nineveh liberation operations. The Wali of Islamic State in Hayy Adan, Marwan Hamed Saleh al-Hayali, was killed.

Map of Mosul control lines (around 22 November 2016)

22 November

On 22 November, in Mosul ISIL fighters were reported targeting Iraqi special forces with rockets and mortars as they slowly advanced in the densely populated Zohour neighborhood. Four of the five Tigris bridges were hit by coalition airstrikes within the previous 48 hours.

Far to the West at the Syrian border, near the town of Baaj, four Islamic State commanders were captured in a U.S. special operation.

23 November

On 23 November, to the West, PMF reported cutting the road between Sinjar and Tal Afar, their Shia component groups advancing from the South linking up with the Sinjar Resistance Units and Êzîdxan Women's Units to the North, thus completing the encirclement of the Mosul pocket.

25 November

50 ISIL fighters were killed and 32 others were arrested with Iraqi Federal Police continuing the operation to clear the area south of Mosul.

30 November

On 30 November, the PMF said that they captured 12 villages from ISIL in the Tal Afar area, over the previous five days. By 30 November, the Peshmerga had cleared the remaining ISIL snipers from the town, though they continued to clear the mines and explosives left behind by ISIL.

At the end of November, the Iraqi military assessed that it had taken control of 19 neighbourhoods in eastern Mosul during the month, constituting somewhat less than 30 percent of the area of Mosul east of the Tigris. While the "Golden Division" Special Operations Forces persistently advanced into East Mosul, the 9th Division took one neighbourhood in the southeast, the 16th Division had not yet breached Mosul city limits from the north, and the 15th Division, advancing from the southwest, was still several kilometres away from western Mosul.

== December: Advancing towards the Syrian border ==
4 December

2 ISIL leaders, Abu Turq and Falah al-Rashidi, were killed in airstrikes by the anti-ISIL coalition on 4 December. Al-Rishdi was involved in the group's use of VBIEDs (vehicle-borne improvised explosive device) and was killed in Mosul. Abu Turq was killed in Shirqat and was a financial facilitator.

6 December

20 airstrikes by the US-led coalition were heard on the morning of 6 December following an assault on the city's strategic main bridge that was held by ISIL. In the overnight hours, ISIL launched a counter-attack in the southeastern area of Mosul, near al-Salam; however, casualty figures from either side were not announced. PMU meanwhile stated that it had captured the southern section of Tal Abta.

7 December

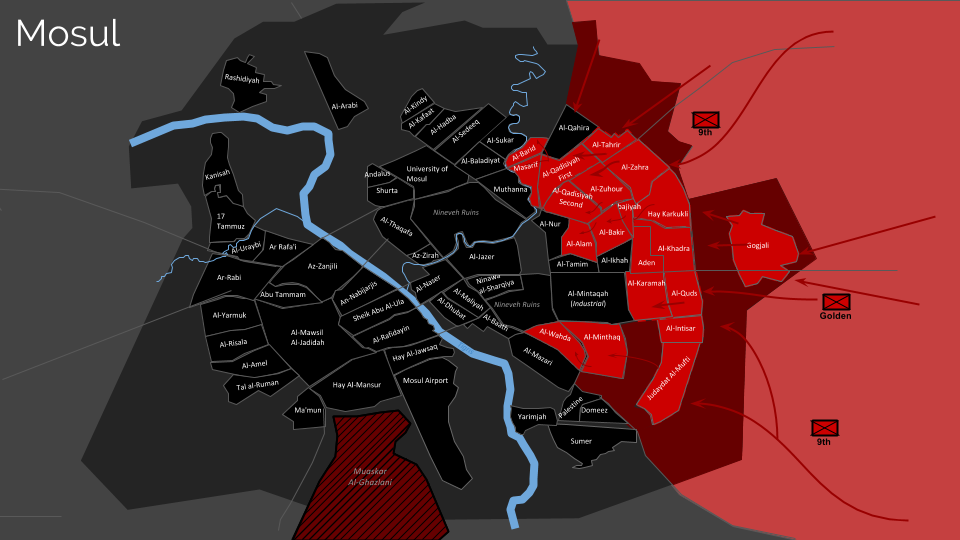
Battle situation as of 7 December 2016

Following the overnight ISIL attack, Iraqi forces continued to secure the al-Salam area, capturing al-Salam hospital. However, ISIL recaptured the hospital after a counterattack which destroyed or disabled 20 Iraqi vehicles.

9 December

Iraqi Joint Operations Command announced on 9 December that they had captured the three districts of Saha, Adel and Tahrir. It further added that Iraqi forces had captured 27 districts of Mosul with clashes ongoing in 4 districts. Lieutenant-General Abdul Ameer Yarallah meanwhile stated that three factories making car bombs in Mosul and three weapons warehouses were destroyed by Iraqi airstrikes.

11 December

The Counter Terrorism Service (CTS) forces mentioned that they had captured another district of east Mosul, al-Nour neighborhood.

12 December

The Iraqi Federal Police said that three of their brigades, initially meant to advance from the southwest toward the airport, were redeployed to join the three "Golden Division" counterterrorism brigades in the east of the city.

13 December

CTS commander Abdul Wahab al-Saedi stated that there were only 6 districts left to be captured by the CTS forces in East Mosul and they had already captured 32 of them. While the PMF to the West continued clearing villages in the desert region of the ISIL heartland, on 13 December it was reported that the Badr militia was targeting villages around Tal Afar to "surround Daesh and tighten the noose around them", and Kata'ib Hezbollah advanced further west towards the Syrian border. Abu Dur al-Tunsi and Bilal al-Shawash, two Tunisian ISIL military commanders, reportedly deserted after they were attacked by Iraqi members. According to the head of Nineveh Media Centre's Raafat al-Zarari, the local militants were being made to fight at the front lines, while some non-Iraqi commanders didn't engage in direct clashes. CTS forces meanwhile captured al-Falah Oula and al-Falah Thaniya districts later in the day while PMU captured 7 villages near Tal Afar.

14 December

On 14 December, 70 ISIL fighters including 20 senior leaders as well as their bodyguards were killed in Iraqi airstrikes on Tel Abta where they were holding a meeting. Meanwhile, 40 civilians were killed in airstrikes and shelling in east Mosul. A number of militants who attempted to launch suicide attacks in 3 districts of east Mosul were also killed, with some of their booby-trapped vehicles also destroyed.

15 December

The Iraqi Federal Police announced on 15 December the capture of Saleh Najem Abdullah, the Media Center Official of ISIL. CTS commander Abdul Ghani al-Assadi meanwhile announced that the first phase of retaking the eastern shores of the city was completed, with CTS forces capturing 40 out of 56 districts.

16 December

PMF were in the process of taking control of more villages to the south and southwest of Tal Afar, after capturing Tel Abth district, home to almost 50,000 people and a major strategic ISIL stronghold, in the previous days. Iraqi forces meanwhile repelled 4 ISIL attacks, killing 174 militants and destroying 13 SVBIEDs.

17 December

An airstrike by the US-led coalition near Mosul destroyed 5 buildings used by ISIL in addition to quantities of weapons and equipment.

18 December

Brig. Gen. Taher al-Sammak of Iraq's SWAT forces stated that the 9th Division, with the assistance of CTS, had started attacking al-Wehda district of east Mosul in order to regain control of al-Salam hospital.

19 December

Captain Iyad Ziad of Nineveh Operations Command stated that Iraqi forces had stormed into al-Mazare' area after retaking large parts of al-Wahda in southeastern Mosul and also killed 14 ISIL fighters including 4 suicide bombers. 4 PMF fighters were meanwhile killed in an ISIL attack on Abu Senam village near Tel Afar. The group also shelled Tel Afar Airport and destroyed 2 PMF vehicles.

21 December

U.S. Air Force Brigadier General Matthew Isler announced on 21 December that pro-government forces had entered a planned operational refit which included repairing vehicles, re-supplying ammunition and preparing for the next stage of the battle. He also stated that they had captured more than a quarter of the city.

22 December

The UN stated, on 22 December, that 4 Iraqi aid workers and 7 civilians were killed by mortar fire. Later, ISIL launched a triple suicide bomb attack at a market in Gogjali. 23 people, including 15 civilians, were killed in the attacks, according to the Iraqi military. The Iraqi Ministry of Defense says the Iraqi Air Force bombarded a gathering of Islamic State members, south of Tal Abta area, killing 20 leaders and 50 members, based on intelligence information.

23 December

The Iraqi Army captured the Mosul Police Academy headquarters in Al-Qahira district on 23 December. This was their first major advance since suspension of military operations a week earlier.

24 December

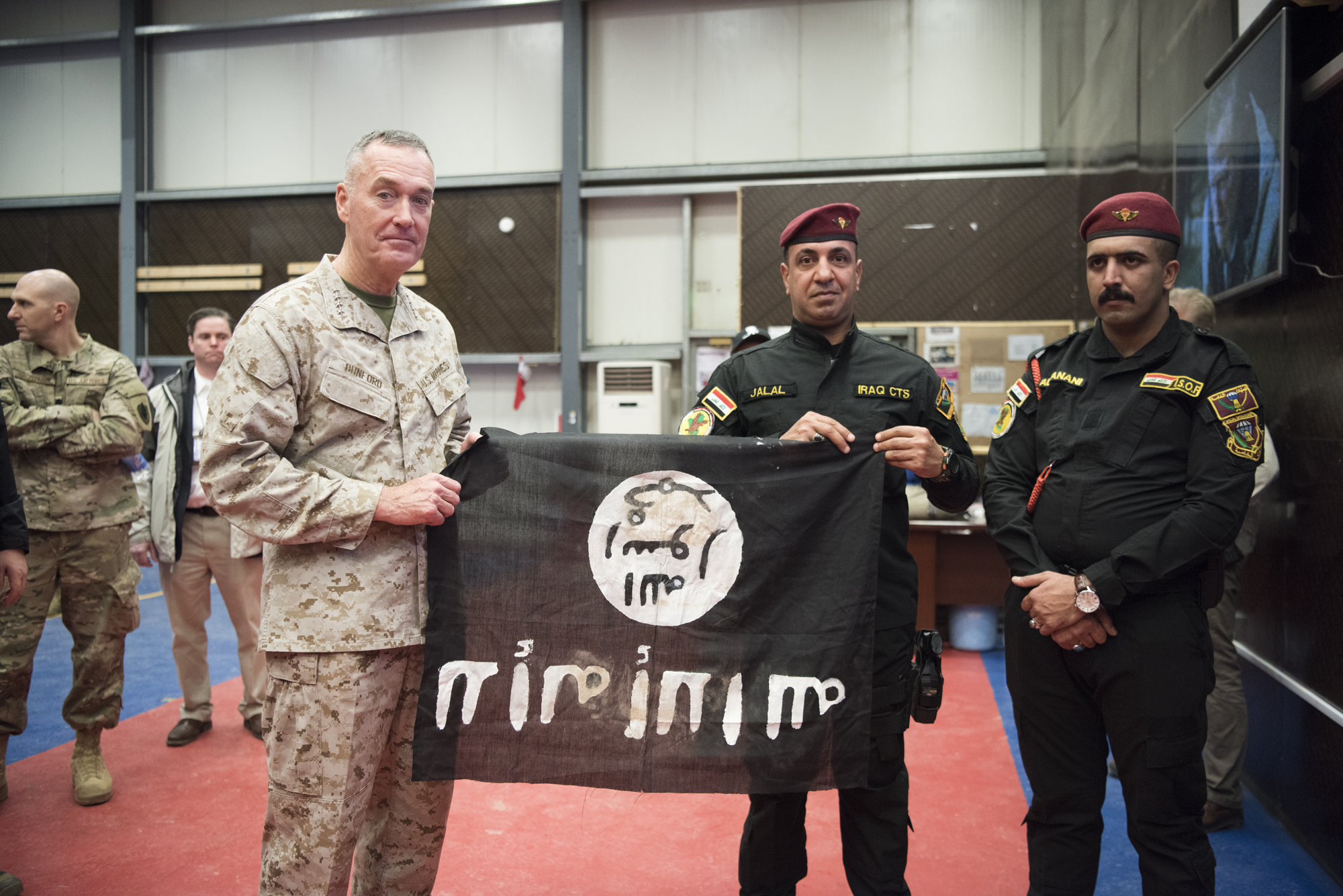
Iraqis present Marine Gen. Joseph Dunford with the ISIL flag upside down

U.S. Army Colonel Brett G. Sylvia stated on 24 December that American soldiers assisting Iraqi forces would be embedded more extensively and would partner with additional formations. Iraqi Prime Minister Haider al-Abadi stated that Iraqi forces were in control of over a third of Mosul. Iraqi Joint Operations Command spokesperson Yahia Rasoul stated that Iraqi forces controlled 44% of Nineveh Governate. He added that CTS forces controlled 40 districts in east Mosul, while the Iraqi Army's 9th Battalion held six districts. Meanwhile, 10 civilians were killed due to ISIL shelling in eastern Mosul.

25 December

At least 97 militants were killed in Mosul during the day according to Operations Commander Lieutenant-General Abdulamir Rashid Yarallah. He stated that an attack by ISIL on police stations south of Abuyosif area resulted in the death of 21 IS fighters. He also added that another attack at Al-Intisar, Salam and Al-Shaima'a neighborhoods had killed 51 jihadists, while the anti-ISIL coalition killed 25 militants in airstrikes on their hideout. CTS reportedly stormed into the Al-Quds district later in the day.

26 December

Commander of Nineveh Operations Major General Najim al-Jabouri announced on 26 December that new military reinforcements had arrived in the Mosul neighborhoods retaken by Iraqi forces, both to enhance their presence and to prepare themselves to storm into the remaining areas of the eastern side. Lieutenant Colonel Stuart James, commander of an American battalion assisting the Iraqi forces, meanwhile stated that a new advance in Mosul would begin within days. The Iraqi Defence Ministry meanwhile stated that 10 militants were killed and 14 ISIL cannons were destroyed in coalition airstrikes in east of Mosul. According to a military official, another 5 ISIL fighters were captured for information after some troops of the 16th Division, disguised as ISIL members, infiltrated inside the Owaiza area.

27 December

The ISIL-run Amaq News Agency stated that the anti-ISIL coalition had destroyed the Old Bridge, the last functioning bridge in Mosul. The US-led Coalition, meanwhile, stated that it had disabled a Mosul bridge with airstrikes without providing the details.

== See also ==
- Timeline of the Battle of Mosul (2016–17): Phase Two
- Timeline of the Battle of Mosul (2016–17): Phase Three
