= Timeline of the Battle of Mosul (2016–17): Phase Two =

Part of the War in Iraq

Coordinates: 35.8003°N 43.2897°E

The following is a timeline of Phase Two of the Battle of Mosul (2016–17) between December 2016 to February 2017.

== Late December: Launch of Phase Two ==
29 December

Iraqi forces launched the second phase of the battle on 29 December, pushing from three directions into eastern Mosul districts. Iraqi soldiers and Iraqi Federal Police entered about half a dozen southeastern districts. Counter Terrorism Service (CTS) meanwhile advanced in al-Quds and Karama districts. In the third front, Iraqi soldiers also pushed toward the northern limits. Jabouri stated that they were ordered by the Prime Minister to reach the Tigris River. An ISIL headquarters in al-Thobat district was reportedly destroyed in coalition airstrikes, killing 12 militants. Later in the day, the commander of the operation declared that they had captured 2 villages to the north of Mosul, killing 70 militants. Iraqi forces had captured half of al-Quds by early afternoon. The Iraqi military later announced that they had killed more than 200 militants during the day.

30 December

Iraqi security forces advanced in several areas on 30 December. In the northern front, the 16th Division stormed the Habdaa district while also trying to cut off the supply lines to Tel Kayf. Meanwhile, ISIL was reported to have evacuated family members of its foreign fighters from four districts in western Mosul. 2 ISIL attacks in eastern Mosul were later repelled. Ammar al-Haweidi, who is an elite leader of ISIL was reported to have been killed by the Iraqi Federal Police. Clashes broke out again in one of the villages reported to be captured a day earlier.

31 December

Heavy clashes occurred on the southeastern and northern fronts of Mosul on 31 December. An Iraqi Army officer deployed in the southeastern front reported that their advances had slowed down, due to heavy clashes and difficulty in differentiating between civilians and militants. Iraqi forces on the northern front advanced towards the periphery of Mosul, with an officer stating that heavy clashes were ongoing in the Argoob area. The CTS destroyed four VBIEDs when ISIL tried to attack them in the street linking al-Ta'mim neighborhood and the garage area in east Mosul. The U.S. military meanwhile stated that its airstrikes on a van carrying ISIL fighters at a hospital compound parking lot might have killed civilians.

== January: Second Phase and capturing eastern Mosul ==
1 January

Iraqi forces continued their advance on 1 January 2017. The military announced that it had captured a part of the Karama district, and a Federal Police officer stated that they had taken near complete control of Intissar and Siha districts, and were clearing the Salam district. CTS linked up with Rapid Response Division during the day at the edge of al-Intissar and al-Quds. Staff Lieutenant General Abdulwahab al-Saadi, a top CTS commander, stated that Iraqi forces had captured more than 60% of east Mosul. Iraqi Defence Ministry's War Media Cell announced during the day that Iraqi forces had captured Yunus al-Sabaawi and Yafa districts in the southeastern part of the city. Lt. Col. Eyad al-Awsyi said that they had also completely captured al-Intissar, and were nearing completion of capturing Karama. Federal Police announced later in the day that they had captured the Gogjali-Intsar road. They also stated during the day that they had captured the strategic No.60 Street to the southeast of Mosul. Army major Ali Mohsen meanwhile said that the Iraqi Army had captured al-Malayeen, al-Kindi and al-Arabi al-Thania districts.

2 January

CTS announced on 2 January that they had completely captured al-Karama district. Sabah al-Numan, the CTS spokesman, later stated that they were clearing the remaining militants in North Karama. ISIL meanwhile cut off a strategic road linking Mosul and Baghdad. The group also shelled Shirqat, after attacking a military barracks near Baiji and seizing weapons. According to the Mayor of Shirqat, they had seized 3 checkpoints on the main road between the city and Baiji. Iraqi authorities later said that they had regained control of the road.

3 January

Iraqi forces stormed three districts on 3 January and killed 50 militants during clashes in 2 of them. The operation commander said that Iraqi Air Force airstrikes had destroyed the office of ISIL's hisbah police located on Mosul-Tel Afar road, and several warfare utilities of the group. The Federal Police said that it had destroyed the headquarters of Jund al-Khilafa (Soldiers of Caliphate), an ISIL explosives factory and a drone headquarters in al-Mithaq district. The Iraqi Army announced later that CTS had captured Karama industrial neighborhood, the Industrial district, the Karama Silo (a flour mill), and a Mercedes Company building during the day. The Ministry of Defense later announced that Iraqi forces had captured the area of exhibitions and the commercial complex to the south of Ta'mim district. The forces later announced that they had captured Al-Hay al-Senai and al-Mithaq districts as well as the Maaridh area to the east of Mosul.

4 January

Iraqi forces cleared Mithaq district and advanced in al-Wahda on 4 January. The United Nations said that civilian casualties had started increasing as they advanced. The Joint Operations Command said that the Federal Police and 9th Division had captured Wahda after heavy clashes, bringing them closer to the city center, and that ISIL counter-attacks in southeastern Mosul had been repelled, with the death of about 40 militants and destruction of 7 VBIEDs. Iraqi forces also advanced in al-Salam, Palestine, al-Shaimaa, Domiez and Sumer districts amid heavy clashes. The Federal Police meanwhile announced the killing of Abu Marawan al-Hadithi, an ISIL leader. Lt.-Gen. Ra'ed Shaker also said that Iraqi forces had cleared al-Wahda, al-Moallemin and Sumer districts, and had captured the Mosul-Kirkuk road. The United States Department of Defense and the anti-ISIL coalition stated that American advisers had entered Mosul along with Iraqi forces.

5 January

Lt.-Gen. Talib Shaghati stated on 5 January that Iraqi forces had captured about 65–70% of east Mosul. During the day, the Federal Police said that they had destroyed three ISIL drones in east Mosul. An attack on PMU near Tal Afar was meanwhile reportedly repelled, with the deaths of 35 militants including senior recruitment agent Abu Qaswara al-Shami. The Federal Police announced that 1,700 ISIL fighters had been killed in the second phase. General Raed Shaker Jawdat stated that the group's headquarters in Nineveh province had been destroyed and Iraqi forces had captured eight districts in the second phase, thus bringing the entire southeastern section of Mosul under their control. He added that they had also captured drone factories, five car bomb manufacturing plants, an electrical plant, a windmill and several schools. He said that all the remaining districts in east Mosul had been surrounded and would be stormed soon.

6 January

On 6 January, CTS was reported to have stormed the al-Muthanna district during an overnight raid across the al-Khawsar river. A CTS spokesman later said that ISIL had been driven out of the district and dozens of militants killed in airstrikes by the anti-ISIL coalition. This was the first time that Iraqi forces had entered Mosul from the north. They also launched an assault on the Hadbaa apartment complex in the northern front, and faced heavy clashes later in the day.

7 January

Iraqi forces continued their advance on 7 January, coming within several hundred metres of the Tigris river. During the day CTS said that they had captured the al-Gharfan district (previously known as al-Baath) and had entered Wahda district. The military later announced that they had captured a hospital complex in Wahda. Meanwhile, a spokesman of the anti-ISIL coalition stated that ISIL had deliberately damaged the fourth bridge as Iraqi forces advanced. Staff Lieutenant General Yarallah said that Iraqi forces had captured Al-Salam Hospital, Al-Shifa Hospital and the Faculty of Medicine, a medical college. They had also captured ISIL's command center and two prisons. He later said that CTS had captured Rifaq, Atibaa 1st and Atibaa 2nd districts, and well as the Hadbaa residential complex.

8 January

On 8 January, al-Saadi said that CTS troops advancing towards Sukkar and Baladiyat districts had been attacked by ISIL from a historic hill, but had been repelled with the help of coalition warplanes, killing dozens of militants. Security sources said that Iraqi forces were shelling ISIL's positions in al-Kindi district in preparation for storming it later, while the 9th division and Federal Police had launched an attack on Sumer and Domiz districts in the southeastern front. The CTS spokesman said that Iraqi forces had reached the Tigris river for the first time in the offensive, advancing towards the eastern side of the fourth bridge. Brett McGurk, USA's envoy to the anti-ISIL coalition, said that ISIL's defences in eastern Mosul were showing signs of collapse. An ISIL attack on Hadbaa apartments was later reportedly repelled, with the death of about 10 militants and destruction of 4 VBIEDs. PMU meanwhile stated that they had repelled an ISIL attack near Adaya, located to the west of Mosul, killing about 10 militants.

9 January

Iraqi military stated on 9 January that CTS had captured the Baladiyat district in the eastern front while the Federal Police and Iraqi Army had captured Domiz and Palestine districts in the southeastern front. CTS also carried out operations to clear Furqan and Atiba districts. An ISIL attack in Furqaan was repelled according to the military, resulting in deaths of 30 militants. Iraqi Defense Ministry's War Media Cell meanwhile stated that Iraqi Air Force killed 25 militants in airstrikes in eastern Mosul while airstrikes by the anti-ISIL coalition killed about 20 militants in al-Abra village near Tal Afar. The group which was still in control of the city's water stations, was reported to have cut the water supply to more than 30 districts captured by Iraqi forces. ISOF meanwhile surrounded the University of Mosul.

10 January

Iraqi Joint Operations Command stated on 10 January that CTS forces had captured the Sukkar and al-Dhubbat districts while advancing in Siddeeq and al-Maliyah districts. Several governmental offices including the communication complex, provincial electricity department and a security headquarters were also captured according to it. It also stated that ISIL had blown up two bridges in order to prevent Iraqi forces from attacking western Mosul. It added that in the southeastern front, the Federal Police and Iraqi Army pushed further into al-Salam, Palestine, Sumer, Yarimja and Sahiron districts. Regarding the northern front it stated that Iraqi Army advanced further into al-Hadbaa while capturing northern part of Sabaa Nisaan. Meanwhile, a security source stated that Iraqi Air Force had conducted airstrikes on headquarters of ISIL's Australian leaders in Mosul, killing the commander of Australian Brigade Khaled Sharouf, also known as Abu Mosab al-Australi along with three of his aides.

11 January

Iraqi forces continued advancing on 11 January with military officials stating that the CTS had advanced in the Sadeeq district and were firing into the adjacent Hadbaa. Iraqi forces also clashed with ISIL in the southern front during the day.

12 January

CTS spokesman al-Numan stated on 12 January that CTS had captured 7th Nissan and Sadeeq districts, successfully linking up with Iraqi Army advancing in Hadbaa district. He claimed that Iraqi forces were now in control of about 85% of eastern Mosul. The Rapid Response Division meanwhile advanced in Sumer and Sahiroun districts. Iraqi Defense Ministry's War Media Cell stated that a senior ISIL leader was killed along with his companions in an airstrike by Iraqi Air Force on their camp in al-Amel district. Security sources stated that 90 militants were killed in airstrikes by Iraqi Air Force on Yaramja district while local sources stated that 3 militants including a senior member in charge of ISIL's prisons were killed in a drone strike in western Mosul. The operation command later announced that Iraqi Army had captured Sumer and Sahiroun districts. PMU meanwhile stated it had captured 3 villages near Tel Abta. The operation command later also announced that Iraqi forces had captured al-Salam district.

13 January

The operation command announced on 13 January that CTS had reached the second bridge of the city, which is also called the "Freedom Bridge". Yarallah stated that in response, ISIL had destroyed all five bridges of the city, in order to slow the Iraqi advance towards western Mosul. CTS later announced they had reached the Old Bridge also known as the "Iron Bridge" and stormed the University of Mosul, capturing a part of its complex later in the day. The operation command later announced that CTS had captured al-Kafa'at district in eastern front as well as al-Sadriya, al-Naser and al-Faisaliyah in central part of East Mosul. Iraqi Army also captured the Hadbaa district during the day, while Yarallah declared that CTS had captured a government complex which included the Nineveh Governorate and council buildings.

14 January

Spokesman Abdel Amir al-Mohammedawi stated on 14 January that the Rapid Response Division had captured the Yarimja area as well as a field hospital ISIL was using. A military statement meanwhile announced that the Federal Police had captured the highway between Mosul and Kirkuk. Iraqi forces later completely captured the University of Mosul, in addition to the eastern side of a third bridge. Meanwhile, 10 militants were reportedly killed or wounded in infighting between a group of ISIL fighters who fled towards west Mosul and the leaders in western side due to mutual accusations. An airstrike by CJTF-OIR on the house of a senior ISIL leader was reported to have resulted in deaths of around 30 civilians. CENTCOM stated that the allegation will be investigated. Suicide bombings were carried out by an Iraqi, Tajik, and an Uzbek.

15 January

On 15 January, Iraqi forces carried out a sweeping operation in the University of Mosul for any hiding militants while continuing their advancement along the Tigris river. The operation command later announced that the Iraqi Army had captured al-Kafaat Thani (Second) district in the northern front while CTS had captured Andalus in the eastern front.

16 January

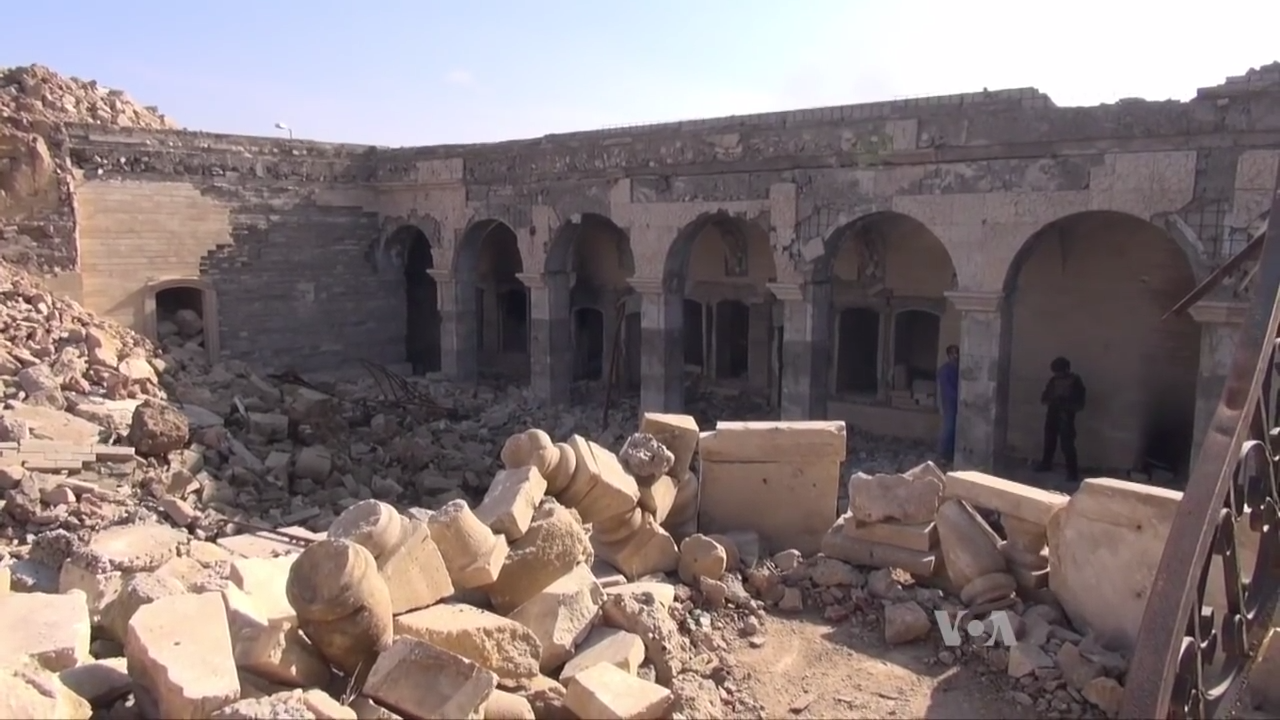
The ruins of the Nabi Yunus mosque after it was captured by Iraqi forces

Clashes occurred in Shurta and Andalus districts on 16 January. By this point, Iraqi forces had taken complete control of the river banks in the south. The operation command during the day announced that the Army had captured Kindi and Qairawan districts while CTS had captured Jammasa. CTS spokesman al-Numan later announced that they had captured the Nabi Yunus area including the Nabi Yunus shrine.

17 January

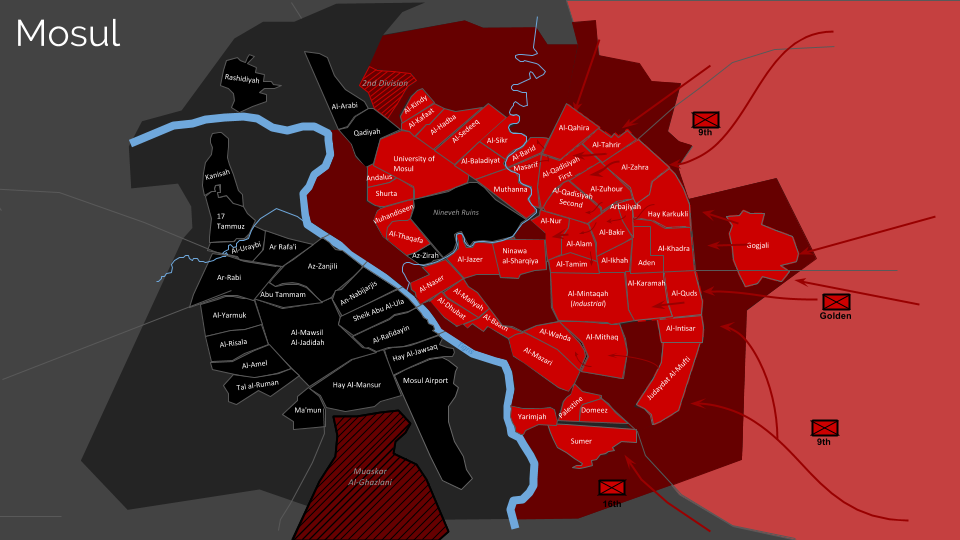
Battle situation as of 17 January 2017.

al-Numan stated that CTS was now in complete control of Shurta and Andalus. He also stated that they had pushed into Eastern Nineveh and Souq al-Ghanam districts. A separate military statement announced that CTS had also captured al-Muhandiseen district. Meanwhile, the Iraqi Army in the northern front stormed the Kindi military base. Yarallah later announced that CTS had captured Nineveh al-Sharqiya, Bab-Shams and Souq al-Ghanam districts in the eastern front. He added that they had also captured Nu'maniya and Uttshana districts in addition to storming the adjacent al-Jazair district. Regarding the northern front, he stated that Iraqi Army had captured the Kindi military base, the former headquarters of the 2nd Division as well as the nearby al-Kindi facility. Iraqi forces also succeeded in capturing all five bridges of the city during the day while al-Saadi announced they had also captured the Zaraei district. CTS also captured Al Jazair, Al Derkazlih, Al Seuis and Sanharib districts during the day. Yarallah also stated that they had captured the Grand Mosque of the city. United States Air Force Colonel John Dorrian stated during the day that Iraqi forces were in control of 85–90% of east Mosul. Iraqi Prime Minister al-Abadi meanwhile stated that Iraqi forces had begun moving against ISIL in western Mosul.

18 January

Lieutenant-General Talib Shaghati announced on 18 January that CTS had captured all the districts of east Mosul they were tasked with taking, and that Iraqi forces were almost in complete control of the eastern side. A military statement announced that a few parts of the city in north had yet to be captured by the Iraqi Army. Shaghati also stated that all five bridges of the city were under control of Iraqi forces. During the day, CTS captured the Nineveh ruins as well as the adjacent Tal Nirgal area. The operation command meanwhile announced that Iraqi Army had captured al-Qadhiyah district and were fighting on the edges of al-Arabi district. PMU meanwhile announced that they had captured 2 areas in the Nineveh Plains region.

19 January

On 19 January, the military statements announced that the Iraqi Army had captured the town of Tel Kayf (after a nearly 3-month-long siege), as well as the Nineveh Oberoi hotel and the "Palaces" area on the eastern bank of the Tigris. Clashes were still ongoing in the Al-Arabi District. Meanwhile, McGurk announced that over 50 watercraft and barges being used by ISIL to supply its members in eastern Mosul were destroyed in airstrikes. Iraqi Air Force carried out an airstrike in al-Zerai area in Mosul, reportedly killing five ISIL leaders including Abdel Wahed Khodier, assistant to Abu Bakr al-Baghdadi; the Islamic Police Chief in Nineveh, Ahmed Khodier Sayer al-Juwan and Agriculture Minister in Tal Afar and Mahlabiya, Abdel Karim Khodier Sayer al-Juwan. Yarallah meanwhile announced that Iraqi forces had also captured the Fadiliyah district and Jaber ibn Hayyan military facility. Iraqi forces also captured the Ghabat area during the day.

20 January

Yarallah announced on 20 January that the 9th Division had captured the free zone in the northern sector. Iraqi forces also captured a pharmaceutical plant to the north of Mosul as well as Al-Arabi 1 district. They also clashed with ISIL in Rashidiyah district. Meanwhile, CTS started clearing the districts they had captured in Mosul. Iraqi Air Forces also said that they carried out an airstrike targeting the regions of Tel Kaif and al-Sehaji, in northeastern Mosul, killing 88 militants.

21 January

Iraqi forces continued advancing in the outskirts of the city on 21 January. During the day, the operation command announced that the Iraqi Army had completely captured al-Arabi district as well as al-Qousiyat village, leaving some 40 militants killed and four car bombs destroyed. The CJTF-OIR also announced that between 19 and 21 January, they had targeted a flotilla of 90 boats and three barges being used by ISIL to cross the Tigris and escape the clashes. On the same day, Coalition officials stated that the fight for west Mosul is expected to be tougher than the fight for east Mosul.

22 January

The Iraqi military announced on 22 January that Iraqi forces had captured Al-Milayeen district and Al-Binaa al-Jahiz area as well as the Mosul-Dohuk road. By this point, only the Rashidiyah district was left under ISIL control in eastern Mosul.

23 January

Iraqi defense ministry issued a statement earlier on 23 January on its website, announcing the complete capture of eastern Mosul. However it was later removed with fighting ongoing in Rashidiyah which the Iraqi Army entered during the day.

24 January

The operation command announced on 24 January that Iraqi troops captured the Rashidiyah district as well as the villages of Ba'wiza, Shrikhan and Baysan. Iraqi Prime Minister al-Abadi later announced the "full liberation" of eastern Mosul.

== Interlude ==
25 January

Battle situation of Mosul as of 25 January 2017

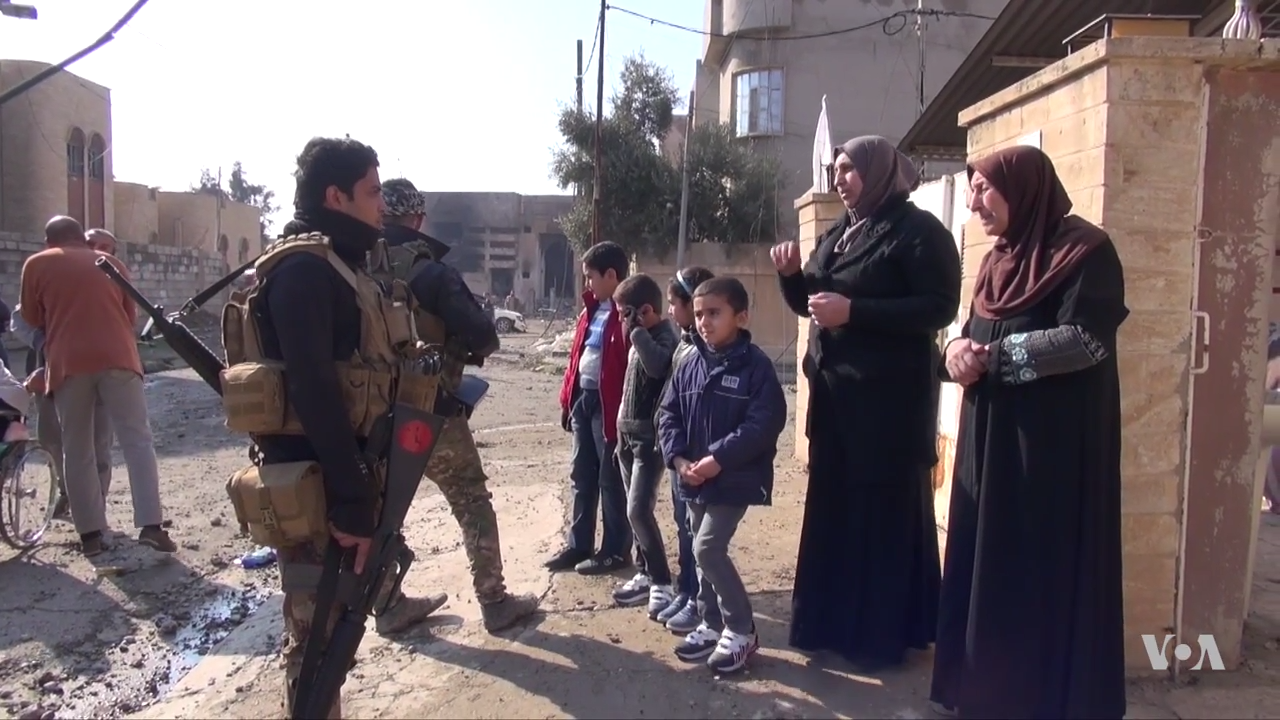
Iraqi soldiers talk with and are greeted by civilians in eastern Mosul

Col. Khaled al-Jewari, from the Joint Operations Command, told DPA that ISIL executed a qadi (senior judge), along with other combat commanders, for escaping from the battle for eastern Mosul.

Meanwhile, the PMU announced that they took over Tel Shana, a strategic hill in Salahuddin, after killing dozens of IS militants. It added that PMUs also took over the villages of ِArab Leith, Mohamed al-Awad and Ard Mosaltan after intense fights with the extremist group.

28 January

The PMU's 2nd Brigade announced that they repelled an attack launched by ISIL on the al-Kobayrat area, to the west of Mosul, killing 40 militants.

30 January

Iraqi state TV reported that the PMU killed 35 ISIL members west of Mosul.

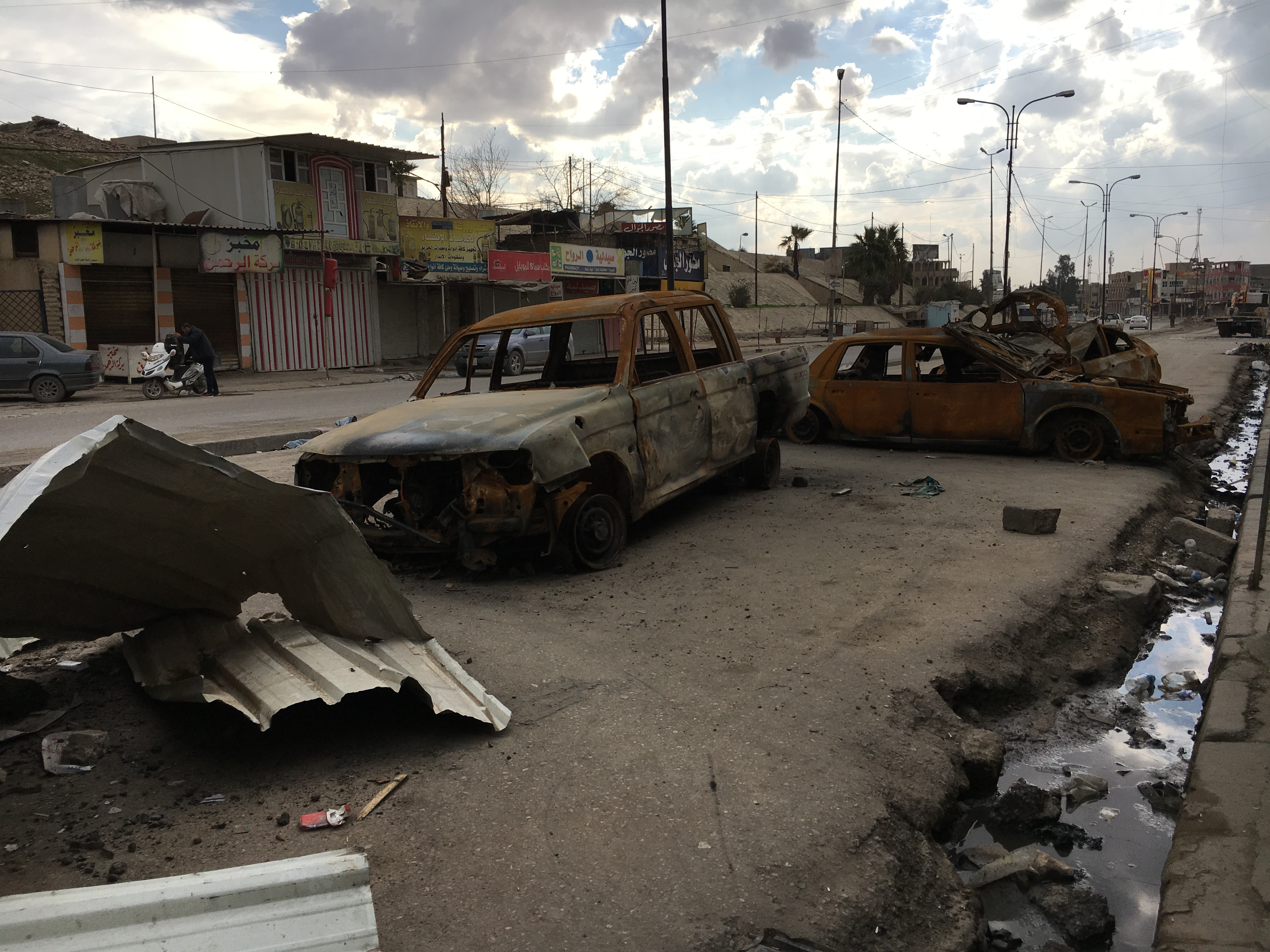
Eastern Mosul, February 2017

3 February

On 3 February, the PMU announced that they had captured the villages of Bostan Radif and Um Gharba, as well as the Sherka region of western Mosul.

13–16 February

On 13 February, more than 200 ISIL fighters launched an attack on three villages to the west of Tal Afar, with tanks and VBIEDs, to regain access between western Mosul and Raqqa. The attack was repelled by the PMU, resulting in deaths of more than 50 ISIL fighters and the destruction of 17 VBIEDs. Another attack on a village to the south of the area was repelled, resulting in deaths of 13 militants, according to the Federal Police. Airstrikes by the anti-ISIL coalition killed Haqi Ismail Hamid al-Emri, a former member of al-Qaeda in Iraq who played a leadership role of ISIL's security networks in Mosul.

Evening Standard reported that on 16 February, RAF Typhoons carried out an airstrike with two Paveway IVs guided bombs targeted and destroyed an IS headquarters in the north-western outskirts of the city.

== See also ==
- Timeline of the Battle of Mosul (2016–17): Phase One
- Timeline of the Battle of Mosul (2016–17): Phase Three
